= List of sheriffs of Anglesey =

This is a list of Sheriffs of Anglesey. Following the conquest of Wales by Edward I, Anglesey was created a county of Wales under the Statute of Rhuddlan, 1284.

On 1 April 1974, under the provisions of the Local Government Act 1972, the office was replaced by that of the Shrievalty of Gwynedd.

== 1284–1499 ==
- 20 March 1284: Sir Roger de Puleston of Emral (first sheriff, killed 1295)
- 16 September 1295: Thomas de Aunvers
- 1 April 1300: John de Havering
- Michaelmas 1301: Walter de Wynton
- Michaelmas 1302: Henry de Dynynton
- Michaelmas 1305: Griffin ap Oweyn
- Michaelmas 1308: Madoc Thloyt
- 4 March 1312: John de Sapy
- 8 August 1316: Eman ap Jevan
- 1396: Gwilym ap Griffydd of Penmynydd

== 16th century ==
- Rhys ap Llewelyn ap Hwlkin (for life)
- 1504–1528: Owen Holland of Berw
- ?–c. 1538: Meyrick ap Llewellyn (Meuric)
- c. 1538: Richard Merrick, of Bodorgan
- 1541: Rowland Gruffydd of Plas Newydd
- 1542: Sir Richard Bulkeley. Kt
- 1543: John ap Rhys ap Llewelyn of Bodychen (1st term)
- 1544: William Bulkeley of Porthamel
- 1545: Rhydderch ap David of Myfyrian
- 1546: Richard Hampton of Henllys
- 1547: Sir Richard Bulkeley (I) of Baron Hill, Anglesey
- 1548: Rowland Gruffydd of Plas Newydd
- 1549: William Lewis of Presaddfed Hall and Gaerwen, Anglesey(1st term)
- 1550: David ap Rhys ap David ap Gwilym of Llwydiarth (1st term)
- 1551: Hugh Peake of Caernarfon
- 1552: Sir Richard Bulkeley (I) of Baron Hill, Anglesey
- 1553: Rowland Gruffydd (died) then Rhys Thomas
- 1554: Thomas Mostyn of Mostyn Hall
- 1555: John ap Rhys ap Llewelyn of Bodychen (2nd term)
- 1556: Thomas ap William of Faenol, Caernarvonshire
- 1557: Robert Bulkeley of Gronant
- 1558: William Lewis of Presaddfed Hall (2nd term)
- 1559: Lewis ab Owen ap Meurig of Frondeg
- 1560: Sir Nicholas Bagnal of Ireland
- 1561: Sir Richard Bulkeley (I) of Baron Hill, Anglesey
- 1562: Maurice Gruffydd of Plas Newydd
- 1563: Owen ap Hugh of Bodeon
- 1564: Rice Thomas of Aber, Caernarfonshire
- 1565: Richard Owen of Penmynydd
- 1566: John Lewis of Presaddfed Hall
- 1567: David ap Rhys ap David ap Gwilym of Llwydiarth (2nd term)
- 1568: Richard White of Monachlog
- 1569: Rowland Bulkeley of Porthamel
- 1570: Sir Richard Bulkeley (I) of Baron Hill, Anglesey
- 1571: Lewis Owen ap Meurick of Frondeg
- 1572: William Lewis of Presaddfed Hall
- 1573: Richard Owen of Penmynydd
- 1574: John Wynne ap Jenkin ap John of Hirdrefaig
- 1575: Thomas Mostyn of Mostyn Hall
- 1576: Edward Conway of Bodtryddan, Flintshire
- 1577: Owen Wood of Rhosmor
- 1578: Dr Ellis Price of Plas Iolyn (1st term)
- 1579: William Thomas of Aber, Caernarfonshire
- 1580: Owen ap Hugh of Bodeon
- 1581: Hugh Hughes of Plas Coch, Porthamel
- 1582: John Griffith of Trefaerthin
- 1583: Richard White of Monachlog
- 1584: Thomas Glyn of Glynllifon
- 1585: Maurice Kyffin of Maenon
- 1586: Dr Ellis Price of Plas Iolyn (2nd term)
- 1587: John Griffith of Trefarthin (1st term)
- 1588: Thomas Mostyn of Mostyn Hall
- 1589: Richard White of Monachlog
- 1590: Sir Roger Mostyn of Mostyn Hall
- 1591: Owen Holland of Berw (1st term)
- 1592: Hugh Hughes of Plas Coch, Porthamel
- 1593: John Griffith of Trefaerthin (2nd term)
- 1594: Richard White of Monachlog
- 1595: Pierce Lloyd of Gwaredeg
- 1596: Arthur Bulkeley of Coyden
- 1597: William Glynne of Glynllifon
- 1598: Sir Richard Bulkeley of Baron Hill, Anglesey
- 1599: Owen Holland of Berw (2nd term)

== 17th century ==
- 1600: Hugh Hughes of Plas Coch, Porthamel
- 1601: Thomas Glynn of Glynllifon, Caernarvonshire
- 1602: Richard Bulkeley of Porthamel
- 1603: Pierce Lloyd, Snr of Lligwy
- 1604: William Lewis of Chwaun
- 1605: William Griffith of Trefarthin
- 1606: John Lewis of Presaddfed Hall
- 1607: Richard Glynn of Glynllifon, Caernarvonshire
- 1698: Sir Hugh Owen, Kt of Bodeon
- 1609: Thomas Holland of Plas Berw (1st term)
- 1610: William Owen of Bodeon
- 1611: John Bodfel of Bodfel
- 1612: Pierce Lloyd, Jnr of Lligwy
- 1613: John Wynne Edward of Bodewryd
- 1614: Owen Wood of Llangwyfan
- 1615: Richard Meyrick of Bodorgan Hall
- 1616: Hugh Lewis ap Howel of Llanylched
- 1617: Richard Williams of Rhosygeido
- 1618: John Lewis of Presaddfed Hall
- 1619: Sir William Glynne, Kt of Glynllifon
- 1620: Henry Lloyd of Bodwiney
- 1621: Hugh Wynne of Mossoglan
- 1622: Sir Thomas Holland of Plas Berw (2nd term)
- 1623: Richard Owen of Penmynydd
- 1624: John Bodychen, Jnr of Bodychen
- 1625: William Thomas of Cwyrt
- 1626: William Griffith of Trefarthin
- 1627: Hugh Morgan of Beaumaris
- 1628: Edward Wynne of Bodewryd
- 1629: Richard Wynne of Rhydcroes
- 1630: Thomas Glynne of Glynllifon
- 1631: William Robinson of Monachty
- 1632: Thomas Chedle of Lleiniog
- 1633: William Bold of Tre'r Ddol
- 1634: Hugh Owen of Bodowen
- 1635: Edward Wynne of Bodewryd
- 1636: Robert Wynne of Tre'r Gof
- 1637: William Bulkeley of Coyden
- 1638: Pierce Lloyd of Lligwy
- 1639: Richard Bulkeley of Porthamel
- 1640: Owen Wood of Rhosmoor
- 1640: Thomas Holland of Plas Berw (3rd term)
- 1641: Richard Meyrick of Bodorgan Hall
- 1642: Thomas Bulkeley of Cleifiog
- 1643: Thomas Chedle of Lleiniog
- 1644: William Bold of Tre'r Ddol
- 1645–1646: Robert Johes of Dreiniog
- 1647–1648: Richard Meyrick of Bodorgan Hall
- 1648: William Bulkeley of Coeden
- 1649: William Bold of Tre'r Ddol
- 1650: Owen Wood of Rhosmoor
- 1651: Pierce Lloyd of Lligwy
- 1652: Henry Owen of Mossoglan
- 1653: Rowland Bulkeley of Porthamel
- 1654: Hugh Owen
- 1655: William Bold of Tre'r Ddol
- 1656: Richard Wood of Rhosmoor
- 1657: Richard Owen of Penmynydd
- 1658: Robert Bulkeley, 2nd Viscount Bulkeley of Baron Hill
- 1659–1660: Henry Lloyd of Bodwiney
- 1661: Thomas Wood of Rhosmoor
- 1662: William Bulkeley of Coeden
- 1663: John Lloyd of Llandegfan
- 1664: Richard Wynne of Penheskin
- 1665: John Owen of Maethlu
- 12 November 1665: Rowland Bulkeley, of Howel Lewis
- 7 November 1666: John Owen, of Penrhos
- 6 November 1667: John Glynne, of Glynllifon, Caernarvonshire
- 6 November 1668: Rowland White, of Monachlog
- 11 November 1669: Coningsby Williams, of Penmynydd
- 1671: Edward Price of Bodowyr
- 1672: Richard Bulkeley of Porthamel
- 1673: Owen Williams of Groesfechan
- 1674: Hugh Williams
- 1675: William Meyrick of Bodorgan Hall
- 1676: Thomas Wynne of Rhydcrosse
- 1677: Thomas Michael
- 1678: Hugh Wynne of Cromlech
- 1679: David Lloyd of Llwydiarth
- 1680: Thomas Wynne of Glascoed
- 1681: Rowland Wynne of Porthamel
- 1682: Robert Parry of Amlwch
- 1683: Owen Hughes of Beaumaris
- 1684: Owen Bold of Tre'r Ddol
- 1685: Roger Hughes of Plas Coch
- 1686: Maurice Lewis of Tryglwyn
- 1687: William Bulkeley of Coyden
- 1688: Sir Hugh Owen of Bodowen, 2nd Baronet
- 1689: Henry Sparrow of Beaumaris
- 1690: John Griffith of Garrelglwyd
- 1691: Sir Thomas Mostyn of Mostyn Hall
- 1692: David Williams of Glanalaw
- 1693: Owen Williams of Carrog
- 1694: William Jones of Pentraeth
- 1695: John Thomas of Aber, Caernarvonshire
- 1696: Henry White of Friars
- 1697: Hugh Wynne of Tre-Iorwerth
- 1698: William Griffith of Garrelglwyd
- 1699: Pierce Lloyd of Llanidan

== 18th century ==
- 1700: Francis Edwards of Penheskin
- 1701: John Williams of Chwaen Isaf
- 1702: John Wynne of Chwaen Wen
- 1703: Robert Owen of Penrhos
- 1704: William Owen of Cremlyn
- 1705: Hugh Wynne of Cromlech
- 1706: Owen Meyrick of Bodorgan Hall
- 1707: Owen Roberts of Beaumaris
- 1708: John Sparrow of Red Hill, Beaumaris
- 1709: John Griffith of Llanddyfnan
- 1710: William Lewis of Trysglwyn
- 1711: John Morris of Cell Lleiniog
- 1712: William Roberts of Caerau
- 1713: Thomas Roberts of Bodiar
- 1714: Edward Bugley of Pleasinwyd
- 1714: William Lewis of Llysdulas
- 1715: William Bulkeley of Brynddu
- 1716: Maurice Williams of Hafodgarregog
- 1717: Edward Bayly of Plas Newydd
- 1718: William Bodvel of Madryn, Caernarvonshire
- 1719: Hugh Hughes of Plas Coch
- 1720: Rice Thomas of Coedhelen
- 1721: Thomas Lloyd of Llanidan
- 1722: Richard Hampton of Henllys
- 1723: William Owen of Penrhos
- 1724: John Griffith of Carreglwyd
- 1725: John Owen of Presaddfed
- 1726: Thomas Rowland of Cayrey
- 1727: Henry Morgan of Henblas
- 1728: John Morris of Cell Lleiniog
- 1729: John Williams of Trearddur
- 1730: Henry Williams of Tros-y-Marian
- 1731: Henry Powell of Llaugefuy,
- 1732: Robert Hampton, of Henllys
- 1733: William Evans of Treveilor
- 1734: Robert Bulkeley, of Gronant
- 1735: Richard Lloyd of Rhosbeirio
- 1736: Richard Roberts of Bodsuran
- 1737: Edmund Meyrick of Trefriw, Caernarvonshire
- 1738: William Robinson, of Monachgu
- 1738: William Roberts of Bodear
- 1739: Robert Williams of Penmynydd
- 1740: Robert Owen, of Pencraig
- 1741: Rice Williams
- 1742: Hugh Jones of Cymunod
- 1743: Hugh Williams of Bryngwyn
- 1744: Richard Hughes of Tre'r Dryw, Castellor
- 1745: John Nangle of Llwydiarth
- 1746: Henry Williams of Tros-y-Marian
- 1747: William Thomas of Glascoed
- 1748: William Lewis of Llanddyfnan
- 1749: Owen Wynn of Penheskin
- 1750: Charles Allanson of Ddreiniog
- 1751: John Lloyd of Hirdrefaig
- 1752: Charles Evans of Treveilor
- 1753: Bodychen Sparrow of Bodychen (son of John, HS 1708)
- 1754: Richard Hughes of Bodwyn
- 1755: Hugh Davies of Brynhirddin
- 1756: Charles Allanson of Ddreiniog
- 1757: John Rowlands of Porthllongdy
- 1758: Edward Owen, of Pen Rhos
- 1759: Robert Owen of Pencraig
- 1760: Robert Lloyd of Tregaian
- 1761: Francis Lloyd of Monachty
- 1762: Hugh Barlow of Penrhos
- 1763: Felix Feast of Bodlew
- 1764: John Lewis of Llanfihangel
- 1765: Herbert Jones of Llynon
- 1766: Hugh Williams of Ty-Fry
- 1767: Hugh Williams of Cromlech
- 1768: William Hughes of Plas Coch
- 1769: William Smith of Ddreiniog
- 1770: John Hampton Jones of Henllys
- 1771: Paul Panton of Plasgwyn
- 1772: John Jone of Penrhosbradwen
- 1773: Henry Sparrow of Red Hill (son of John, HS 1708)
- 1774: Owen Putland Meyrick of Bodorgan Hall
- 1775: William Lloyd of Llwydiarth
- 1776: Hugh Hughes of Bodrwydd
- 1777: Rice Thomas of Cemmaes
- 1778: Owen Jones of Penrhosbradwen
- 1779: William Peacock of Llanedwen
- 1780: Holland Griffith of Gaerreglwyd
- 1781: John Bodychan Sparrow of Red Hill (son of Henry, HS 1773)
- 1782: William Vickens of Llanfawr
- 1783: Morgan Jones of Skerries
- 1784: Thomas Assheton Smith of Dreiniog
- 1785: Richard Lloyd, of Monachdu
- 1786: Arthur Owen of Bodowyr
- 1786: William Pritchard of Trescawen
- 1787: John Griffith Lewis of Llanddydfan
- 1788: Henry Pritchard of Tresawen
- 1789: John (William) Williams, of Nantanog
- 1790: Thomas Williams of Llanidan
- 1791: Herbert Jones of Llynon
- 1792: Hugh Price of Wern
- 1793: Evan Lloyd of Maes-y-Porth
- 1794: Hugh Jones of Carrog
- 1795: John Bulkeley of Pressaddved
- 1796: John Morris of Conway Gelliniog
- 1797: Richard Jones
- 1798: William Evans of Glen Claw
- 1799: Hugh Wynne of Chwaen Ddu

== 19th century ==
- 5 February 1800: John Price, of Wern
- 21 February 1800: Evan Hughes, of Gwdryn
- 5 March 1800: William Harvey, of Parciau
- 11 February 1801: John Price, of Wern
- 10 February 1802: William Bulkeley Hughes, of Brynddu
- 10 March 1802: Gwyllim Lloyd Wardle, of Cefn Coch
- 3 February 1803: William Bulkeley Hughes, of Plas Coch
- 1 February 1804: Thomas Parry Jones, of Cefn Coch
- 27 June 1804: Charles Evans, of Trefeil
- 6 February 1805: John Williams, of Treban
- 1 February 1806: Sir Hugh Owen, 6th Baronet, of Bodowen
- 4 February 1807: Paul Panton, of Plas Gwyn
- 3 February 1808: Edward Jones, of Cromlech
- 24 February 1808: John Jones, of Penrhos Bradwen
- 6 February 1809: Sir John Thomas Stanley, 7th Baronet, of Bodewryd
- 31 January 1810: Hugh Evans, of Henblas
- 8 February 1811: Henry Williams, of Trearddur
- 24 January 1812: Hugh Bulkeley Owen, of Coedanna
- 10 February 1813: John Hampton Hampton, of Henllys
- 4 February 1814: George Francis Barlow, of Tynllwyn
- 13 February 1815: Robert Hughes, of Plas Llangoed
- 1816: John Price, of Plas Llanfallog
- 1817: Rice Thomas of Cemmaes
- 1818: John Price of Plas Cadnant
- 1819: William Pritchard Llwyd
- 1820: Robert Lloyd, of Tregayan
- 1821: James Webster of Derry
- 1822: William Wynne Sparrow of Redhill
- 1823: Jones Panton
- 1824: John Owen of Trehwyfa
- 1825: Thomas Meyrick of Cefncoch
- 1826: Hugh Davies Griffiths of Caerhwn
- 1827: Richard Bulkeley Williams Bulkeley of Baron Hill
- 1827: Owen John Augustus Fuller Meyrick of Bodorgan
- 1828: Jones Panton of Llanddyfnan
- 1829: Henry Prichard, of Madyn
- 1830: Thomas Williams, of Glanrafon
- 1831: Owen Owen, of Llanfigael
- 1832: Sir John Hay Williams, 2nd Baronet, of Bodelwyddan Castle
- 1833: Charles Henry Evans, of Henblas
- 1834: James King, of Presaddfed
- 1835: William Hughes, of Plas Llandyfrydog
- 1836: Richard Lloyd Edwards, of Monachdu
- 1837: Hugh Beaver, of Glyn Garth
- 1838: William Barton Panton, of Garreglywd
- 1839: James Greenfield, of Rhyddgaer
- 1840: Sir Love Parry Jones-Parry, of Madryn
- 1841: Richard Trygarn Griffith, of Garreglwyd
- 1842: John Sanderson, of Aberbraint
- 1843: Owen Roberts, of Tynewydd
- 1844: Edmund Edward Meyrick, of Cefncoch
- 1845: Robert Jones Hughes, of Plas Llangoed
- 1846: John Lewis Hampton Lewis, of Henllys
- 1847: Spencer Bulkeley Wynn, 3rd Baron Newborough, of Treiddon
- 1848: Sir Harry Goring, 8th Baronet, of Trysglwyn
- 1849: Stephen Roose, of Tan y lan
- 1850: Richard Griffith, of Bodowyr Isaf
- 1851: Thomas Owen, of Tyddyn Glan-y-Mor
- 1852: Evan Lloyd, of Maes-y-Porth, died in office and was replaced by Rice Roberts, of Tal-y-Lyn
- 1853: Richard Williams Prichard, of Erianell
- 1854: Robert Brisco Owen, of Haulfre, near Beaumaris
- 1855: Hugh Robert Hughes, of Bodrwyn
- 1856: John Jacob, of Llanfawr
- 1857: John Thomas Roberts, of Ucheldre
- 1858: Richard Davies, of Bwlch-y-fen
- 1859: Henry Owen Williams, of Trearddur
- 1860: George Richard Griffith, of Pencraig
- 1861: William Bulkeley Hughes, of Plas Coch
- 1862: Robert Davies, of Bwlch-y-fen
- 1863: Robert Lloyd Jones Parry, of Tregaian
- 1864: William Massey, of Cornelyn
- 1865: George Higgins, of Red Hill
- 1866: Henry Warrender FitzMaurice, of Tregof
- 1867: William Griffith of Bodowyr
- 1868: Henry Lambert of Tan-y-Graig
- 1869: Thomas Lewis Hampton of Henllys
- 1870: Sir Richard Bulkeley Williams-Bulkeley, 10th Baronet of Baron Hill
- 1871: John Jones of Tre-anna
- 1872: William Williams of Tyddyn Mawr
- 1873: William Humphrey Owen of Plasyn Penrhyn
- 1874: Robert Roberts of Plas Llechylched
- 1875: David Morgan of Bryngwyn Hall, Llangeinwen
- 1876: Lieutenant-Colonel Robert Bramston Smith of Pencraig, Llangefni
- 1877: Sir Richard Mostyn Lewis Williams-Bulkeley, 11th Baronet of Baron Hill, Beaumaris
- 1878: Sir George Tapps-Gervis-Meyrick, 3rd Baronet of Bodorgan
- 1879: George Pritchard Rayner of Trescawen
- 1880: Henry Platt of Gorddinog, near Bangor
- 1881: Thomas Edward John Lloyd of Plas Tregaian
- 1882: Hugh Edwards of Rose Mount, Holyhead replaced original candidate Sir Chandos Stanhope Hoskyns Reade, of Garreglwyd
- 1883: Thomas Fanning Evans of Amlwch
- 1884: Robert ap Hugh Williams of Plas Llwynon
- 1885: Richard Reynolds Rathbone of Glan Menai
- 1886: David Hughes of "Wylfa" Cemaes, Anglesey also "Winterdyne" 83 Newsham Drive, Liverpool
- 1887: Sir Richard Williams-Bulkeley, 12th Baronet of Baron Hill, Beaumaris
- 1888: Henry Herbert Williams of Trecastell, Beaumaris
- 1889: Colonel George McCorquodale of Gadlys
- 1890: Charles Hughes Hunter of Plas Coch
- 1891: Henry Robert Poole of Beaumaris
- 1892: Harry Clegg of Plas Llanfair
- 1893: Captain Owen Thomas of Brynddu, Rhosgoch
- 1894: George Robb-Cox of Min-y-Garth
- 1895: Samuel Taylor Chadwick of Haulfre
- 1896: Rupert Mason of Tan-y-Coed, Llandegfan
- 1897: William Thomas of Tregarnedd, Llangefni
- 1898: John Robert Davies of Ceris, Bangor
- 1899: Claud Hamilton Vivian of Plas Gwyn, Pentraeth

== 20th century ==
- 1900: Richard Bennett, of Beaumaris
- 1901: William Jones of Llwydiarth Fawr, Llanerchymedd
- 1902: Russell Allen of Beaumaris
- 1903: Robert Williams Roberts of Craig Owen, Menai Bridge
- 1904: William Glynne Massey of Cornelyn, Beaumaris
- 1905: John Prichard-Jones of Bron Menai, Dwyrau
- 1906: Owen Prichard of Gloucester-square, London
- 1907: Captain Eric James Walter Platt of Bryn-y-mel, Menai Bridge
- 1908: Robert Edward Jones of Frondeg, Rhosneigr
- 1909: Henry Rees Davies of Treborth, Bangor, Carnarvonshire
- 1910: James Venmore of Anfield, Liverpool (Born 1850, Llanerchymedd, Anglesey)
- 1911: Major William Augustus Lane Fox-Pitt of Presaddfed, Bodedern, Valley
- 1912: Robert John Thomas of Garreg Lwyd, Holyhead and Wimbledon, London
- 1913: Arthur Stanley, 5th Baron Sheffield, of Penrhos, Holyhead
- 1914: Arthur Frederick Pearson of Soldiers' Point, Holyhead and Queen's Gate, London, S.W.
- 1915: Henry Stinton Lowe of Rhosneigr, Ty Croes
- 1916: Alexander Thomas Eccles of Uwchydon, Trearddur Bay, Holyhead and The Grange, Darwen, Lancs
- 1917: Henry Mulleneux Grayson of Ravens Point, Holyhead and Lancaster Gate, London, W.
- 1918: Frederick William Turner, of Cartrefle, Menai Bridge
- 1919: Thomas Williams, of 145, Edge Lane, Liverpool
- 1920: Ernest Bland Royden of Uwchydon, Trearddur Bay, Anglesey
- 1921: John Horridge of Plas Llanfai
- 1922: Owen Williams of Ormonde House, Buckhurst Hill, Essex
- 1923: Major Sir Charles MacIver of Glan-y-Menai, Menai Bridge
- 1924: Charles Livingston of Minygarth, Glyngarth
- 1925: Sir Francis Henry Dent of Porthyfelin, Holyhead
- 1926: Reginald Moseley of Collar House, Prestbury, Cheshire and Cerrig, Penmon, Anglesey
- 1927: Segar Segar-Owen of Kelmscott, Appleton, near Warrington and 4, Victoria Terrace, Beaumaris, Anglesey
- 1928: Capt. Richard Rees Davies of Treborth, Bangor
- 1929: Lieut.-Col. Bertie Cunynghame Dwyer-Hampton of Henllys, Beaumaris
- 1930: Edward Dean of Porthycastell, Trearddur Bay, Holyhead
- 1931: Sir William Henry Hoare Vincent of Treborth, Bangor
- 1932: Richard Joseph Yeoward of Belan Fawr, Rhosneigr, Anglesey
- 1933: David Evans of Cynlais, Beaumaris
- 1934: Hugh Lewis of St. David's, Rhosneigr
- 1935: Lieut.-Col. John Evans Lloyd, of Bryn, Llanerchymedd
- 1936: Raymond Yeoward of Belan, Rhosneigr
- 1937: Edward Rye of The Ridge, Glyn Garth
- 1938: John Parry Thomas of Porthwen, Seafield Drive, Wallasey and Porthwen, Amlwch, Anglesey
- 1939: Major Sir George Llewelyn Tapps-Gervis-Meyrick, Bt. of Bodorgan
- 1940: John Richard Jones of Glasgraig Isaf, Rhosybol, Anglesey and Cintra, 109, Menlove Avenue, Liverpool, 18
- 1941: Arthur Venmore of "Bronydd", Cemaes Bay, Anglesey
- 1942: Herbert James Rowse of Cae Llyn, Rhoscolyn, Anglesey.
- 1943: Sir Alfred Rowland Clegg of Llanidan Hall, Brynsiencyn, Anglesey.
- 1944: Thomas Forshaw of Penmorfa, Pentraeth, Anglesey
- 1945: Roger Edward John Lloyd of Plas Tregayan, Llangefni, Anglesey
- 1946: George Derek Leigh Tootell of Pen-y-Graig, Rhoscolyn, Anglesey
- 1947: James Chadwick of Haulfre, Llangoed, Beaumaris, Anglesey
- 1948: George Tregarneth of Voelvanna, Church Bay, Rhydwyn, Holyhead, Anglesey
- 1949: Lieut-Col. Adam Trevor Smail, of Henblas, Bodorgan, Anglesey
- 1950: Sir Michael Duff, 3rd Baronet of Vaynol Park, Bangor, Caernarvon, and Trefarthen, Anglesey
- 1951: Charles Dundas Lawrie of Plas Gwyn, Pentraeth, Anglesey
- 1952: Lieut.-Colonel Ernest Gee, of Coedan, Rhoscolyn
- 1953: Charles Dundas Lawrie, of Plas Gwyn, Pentraeth
- 1954: John Howell Hughes, of Bwthyn Pereos, Cemlyn, Cemaes Bay
- 1955: Major Frederick Noel Carpenter, of Carreglwyd, Llanfaethlu, Holyhead
- 1956: Major Claude Fanning-Evans, of Plas Cadnant, Menai Bridge
- 1957: Harold Owen, of Llynon Hall, Llanddeusant
- 1958: Mary Conway Burton, of Beaumaris
- 1959: William Edmondson, of The Lodge, Glyn Garth, Menai Bridge
- 1960: Colonel Antony Piers de Tabley Daniell, of Dafarn Newydd, Llangefni
- 1961: Ethel Kenrick Williams, of Hafod Wen, Rhosneigr
- 1962: Lieut.-Colonel Sir George David Eliott Tapps Gervis Meyrick, Bt, of Bodorgan
- 1963: Francis John Watkin Williams, of Windmill Lodge, Talwrn
- 1964: Lieut-General Sir (Edwin) Otway Herbert, of Llanidan, Brynsiencyn
- 1965: Dr. John Tudor Owen, of Dinam Hall, Llangaffo
- 1966: John Rice Francis Mills, of Rhiwlas, Pentraeth
- 1967: Brian John Crichton, of Bryn Hyfryd, Llansadwrn
- 1968: Gaynor Mair Cemlyn-Jones, of Pen-y-clip, Menai-Bridge
- 1969: Peter Denis Pitcairn Kemp, of Y Wenallt, Llandegfan
- 1970: Captain Lawrence Hugh Williams, of Old Parciau, Marianglas
- 1971: Captain Eric Hewitt, of Ty Gwyn, Penmen, Beaumaris
- 1972: Dr. Emyr ap Cynan, of Pen Parc, Holyhead
- 1973: William Denholm Coulson, of Plas Newydd Home Farm, Llanfairpwll

For 1974 onwards, see High Sheriff of Gwynedd.
