= Richard Bulkeley =

Richard Bulkeley may refer to:

- Richard Bulkeley III, MP for Anglesey (1589)
- Richard Bulkeley (died 1573), MP for Anglesey (variously between 1549 and 1572)
- Richard Bulkeley (died 1621) (1533–1621), MP for Anglesey (1563, 1604–1614), son of the above
- Richard Bulkeley (died 1640), MP for Anglesey (1626–1629)
- Richard Bulkeley (civil servant) (1717–1800), administrator of Nova Scotia
- USS Richard Bulkeley, trawler, originally HMT Richard Bulkeley, later USS Richard Bulkeley

== Bulkeley baronets ==
- Sir Richard Bulkeley, 1st Baronet (1634–1685), Irish MP for Baltinglass
- Sir Richard Bulkeley, 2nd Baronet (1660–1710), Irish MP for Fethard (County Wexford)

== Viscounts Bulkeley ==
- Richard Bulkeley, 3rd Viscount Bulkeley (c. 1658–1704), MP for Beaumaris (1679) and Anglesey (1679–1685, 1690–1704)
- Richard Bulkeley, 4th Viscount Bulkeley (1682–1724), MP for Anglesey (1704–1715, 1722–1724), son of the above
- Richard Bulkeley, 5th Viscount Bulkeley (1707–1738), MP for Beaumaris (1730–1739), son of the above

== See also ==
- Richard Williams-Bulkeley (disambiguation)
- Richard Philipps, 1st Baron Milford (second creation) (Richard Bulkeley Philipps Philipps, 1st Baron Milford))
