= William Glynne (MP) =

Member of the Parliament of England

Sir William Glynne (1566 – 1620) of Llanfwrog, Anglesey and Glynllifon, Caernarvonshire was a Welsh lawyer who was elected to the House of Commons for Anglesey in 1593.

He was the eldest son of Thomas Glynne of Glynllifon, whom he succeeded in 1608, and was educated in England at University College, Oxford (1578) before studying law at Furnival's Inn and Lincoln's Inn (1586).

He sat as MP for Anglesey in 1593. He served in various legal capacities before inheriting his father's Glynllifon estate and was pricked High Sheriff of Anglesey for 1597–97 and again for 1618–19. He was knighted in 1606.

== Death ==
He died in 1620, having married twice, firstly in 1594, Jane, the daughter of John Griffith (of Plas Mawr), Caernarvon, with whom he had 6 sons and 4 daughters and secondly c.1608, Alice, the daughter of John Conway of Bodrhyddan, Flintshire and widow of Rowland Bulkeley of Porthamel, Anglesey. He was succeeded by his eldest son Thomas Glynn, MP for Caernarvonshire. His second son was John Glynne, also an MP, who became Lord Chief Justice of the Upper Bench.

Parliament of England
Preceded by Richard Bulkeley III	Member of Parliament for Anglesey; 1593	Succeeded by Hugh Hughes
