= Meyrick family =

Welsh family, of Bodorgan, Anglesey

The Meyrick family (later spelling Merrick) of Bodorgan, Anglesey, Wales, is descended from Cadafael, lord of Cedewain, Powys.

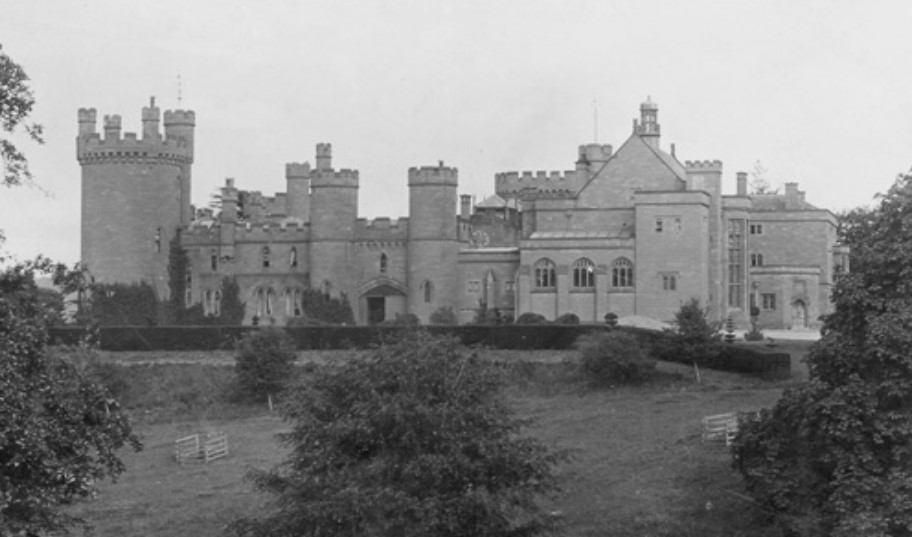
Goodrich Court, a property of the Meyrick family

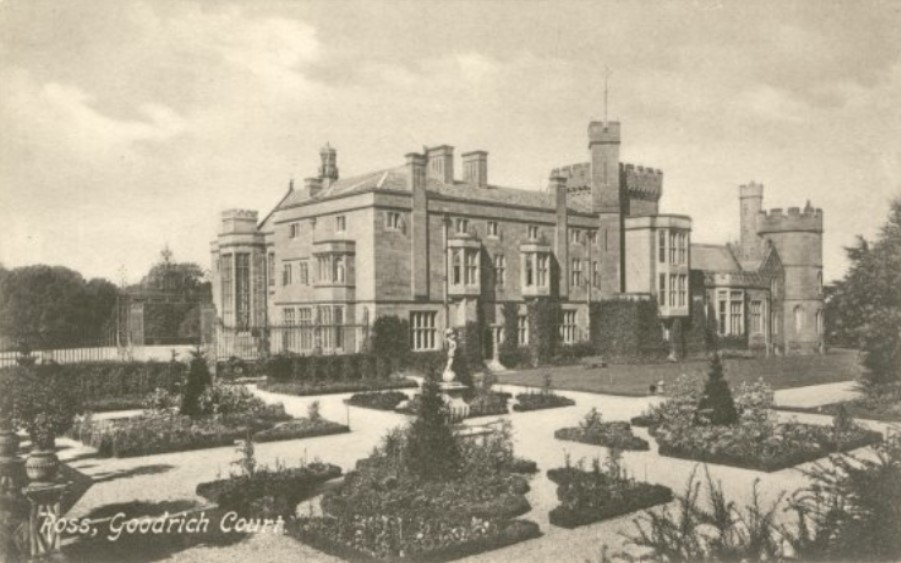
Goodrich Court, court view

Location of Bodorgan, Anglesey

== Notable family members ==
Llewelyn ap Heylin fought at the battle of Bosworth for Henry Tudor.

Meurig ap Llewelyn, son of Llewelyn ap Meyrick, became captain of the bodyguard for Henry VIII. He was granted the Crown lease of Aberffraw manor.

Richard Meyrick II (died 1596), grandson of Meurig ap Llewelyn, fought a legal battle against Hugh Owen of Bodeon over lands included in Aberffraw manor estate. The Bodorgan estate suffered financially, resulting in the selling of large portions of the estate to cover debt.

Richard Meyrick III (died 1644), son of Richard Meyrick II, was appointed sheriff of Anglesey in 1614.

Owen Meyrick I (1682–1760), great-grandson of Richard Meyrick III and second son of William Meyrick (1644–1717), significantly enlarged the boundaries of the estate. He unsuccessfully ran against Lord Bulkeley in the 1708 Anglesey election, challenging his authority. Meyrick was elected to Parliament 1715–1722 and was sheriff 1705–1706. He served as custos rotulorum from 1715 until his death. He had called in Lewis Morris to measure the Bodorgan estate.

Owen Meyrick II (1705–1770), son of Owen Meyrick I, married the daughter of a wealthy John Putland of London. His son, Owen Meyrick III (1752–1825) also married an heiress, Clara, daughter of Richard Garth, lord of the manor of Morden, Surrey, and great-aunt of Sir Richard Garth. Owen Meyrick III had a daughter, Clara, who married Augustus Fuller of Ashdowne House, Sussex. Their son, Owen Fuller (1804–1876) took on the name Meyrick when he inherited the Bodorgan estate.

Edmund Meyrick (1636–1713), from a branch of Meyricks established at Gwyddelwern, was a benefactor and Welsh cleric.

Rowland Meyrick (1505–1566), born at Bodorgan but founded a branch of Meyricks at Monkton, Pembroke, was a bishop of Bangor.

Sir Gelly Meyrick (c. 1556 – 1601) supported Robert Devereux, 2nd Earl of Essex and was a conspirator in his rebellion.

Sir Francis Meyrick (died 29 July 1660), brother of Sir Gelly, commandeered the west Wales contingents in Irelend in 1599. He was knighted 5 August 1599.

Sir John Meyrick (1584–1659), third son of Sir Francis, fought in the Thirty Years' War under Gustavus Adolphus and became MP for Newcastle-under-Lyme in the Short Parliament and the later Long Parliament.

Gelly Meyrick, brother of Sir John, was an ensign in the Bishops' Wars. He was knighted 26 March 1639.

John Meyrick of Bush (born 1674), grandson of Sir John, studied at Jesus College, Oxford, and the Middle Temple. He represented Pembroke and Cardigan in Parliament (1702–1708 and 1710–1712 respectively) before becoming puisne judge of the Anglesey or North Wales Circuit of the Court of Great Sessions 1712–1714.

Francis Meyrick, brother to John (above), was a registrar of North Wales

Sir Samuel Rush Meyrick (1783–1848) English collector and scholar of arms and armour.

== Modern day ==
A branch of the Meyrick family still lives in Pembrokeshire.

== See also ==
- Tapps-Gervis-Meyrick baronets
