= Hermon, Anglesey =

Village in Anglesey, Wales

Coordinates: 53.19318°N 4.412137°W

Hermon
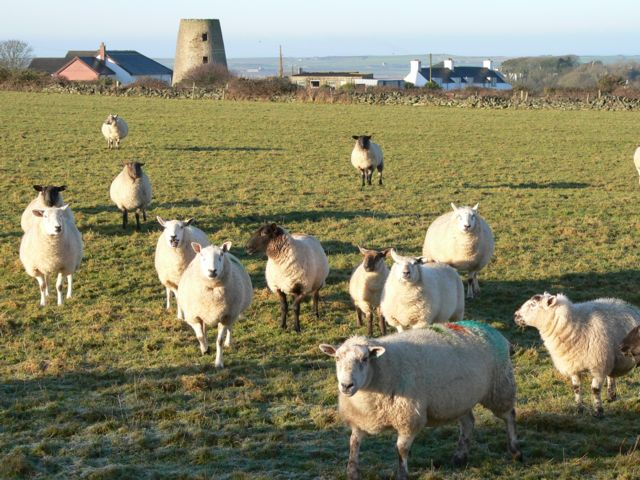

- Location within Anglesey
- OS grid reference: SH389689
- Principal area: Anglesey
- Preserved county: Gwynedd
- Country: Wales
- Sovereign state: United Kingdom
- Post town: BODORGAN
- Postcode district: LL62
- Dialling code: 01407
- Police: North Wales
- Fire: North Wales
- Ambulance: Welsh
- UK Parliament: Ynys Môn
- Senedd Cymru – Welsh Parliament: Ynys Môn

Hermon is a village in Anglesey, in north-west Wales. It is located roughly halfway between Newborough and Aberffraw, some 6 miles south-west of Llangefni. The nearest railway station is Bodorgan on the North Wales Coast Line. It is in the community of Bodorgan.

The village has a disused windmill named Melin Hermon.
