= Trefarthen =

Coordinates: 53.170111°N 4.270698°W

- Location within Anglesey
- OS grid reference: SH 4832 6607
  - Cardiff: 125.6 mi (202.1 km)
  - London: 209.2 mi (336.7 km)
- Community: Llanidan
- Principal area: Anglesey
- Country: Wales
- Sovereign state: United Kingdom
- Post town: Llanfair Pwllgwyngyll
- Police: North Wales
- Fire: North Wales
- Ambulance: Welsh
- UK Parliament: Ynys Môn
- Senedd Cymru – Welsh Parliament: Ynys Môn

Trefarthen is a village in the community of Llanidan, Anglesey, Wales, which is 125.6 miles (202.1 km) from Cardiff and 209.2 miles (336.7 km) from London.

Of historical and archaeological interest are a Georgian mansion and the possible site of a 16th-century house.

== See also ==
- List of localities in Wales by population
