= Lewis Owen =

Lewis Owen may refer to:

- Lewis ab Owen (died 1555), Chamberlain of North Wales, Sheriff and MP for Merioneth
- Lewis ab Owen ap Meurig (died 1590), Sheriff and MP for Anglesey
- Lewis Owen (Merioneth MP, died 1692) (died 1692), barrister and MP for Merioneth in 1659
- Lewis Owen, Custos Rotulorum of Merionethshire in 1722

== See also ==
- Owen Lewis (disambiguation)
- Louis Owens
