= John Griffith (MP for Beaumaris) =

Welsh politician, died 1642

John Griffith (1591 – June 1643) was a Welsh politician who sat in the House of Commons at various times between 1621 and 1642.

Griffith was the son of John Griffith (of Cefnamlwch), Llyn. He matriculated at Brasenose College, Oxford aged 15 on 31 October 1606 and became a member of Lincoln's Inn in 1609.

In 1618 he was appointed High Sheriff of Caernarvonshire. He was elected Member of Parliament for Carnarvonshire in 1621. He became Constable of Carnarvon Castle on 18 July 1622. In 1626 he was re-elected MP for Carnarvonshire. He became Vice Admiral of North Wales in September 1626. In 1628 he was re-elected MP for Carnarvonshire and sat until 1629 when King Charles decided to rule without parliament for eleven years.

In November 1640, Griffith was elected MP for Beaumaris in the Long Parliament and sat until his death in 1642.

Griffith died at the age of 51.

Griffith married May Trevor, daughter of Sir Richard Trevor of Trevalyn. His son John was also MP for Carnarvonshire in the Long Parliament.

Parliament of England
Preceded by Richard Wynn	Member of Parliament for Carnarvonshire; 1621	Succeeded by Thomas Glynn
Preceded by Thomas Glynn	Member of Parliament for Carnarvonshire; 1626–1629	Parliament suspended until 1640
Preceded by Charles Jones	Member of Parliament for Beaumaris; 1640–1642	Succeeded by William Jones
