= Owen Holland =

Owen Holland may refer to:

- Owen Holland (academic), professor of cognitive robotics
- Owen Holland (MP) (died 1601), Welsh politician
