= Bodorgan Hall =

Mansion on Anglesey, Wales

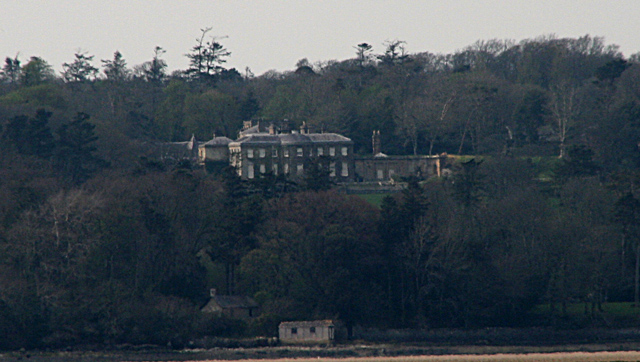
- Bodorgan House

- Location within Anglesey

General information
- Architectural style: Neo-classical
- Location: Bodorgan, Anglesey, Wales
- Coordinates: 53°10′44″N 4°25′0″W
- Construction started: 1779
- Completed: 1782

Design and construction
- Architect: John Cooper

Website
- https://bodorgan.com/

Bodorgan Hall is a country house and estate located in the hamlet of Bodorgan, Anglesey, Wales, situated near the Irish Sea in the southwestern part of the island. The hall is the seat of the Meyricks, and is the largest estate on Anglesey. The hall is the home of Sir George Meyrick and his wife, Candida Tapps Gervis Meyrick.

The house is a Grade II* listed building, and various other structures on the estate, such as a dovecote and a barn are listed at Grade II. The parkland is listed, jointly with the Bodowen Estate, as Grade II* on the Cadw/ICOMOS Register of Parks and Gardens of Special Historic Interest in Wales. It is also an Area of Outstanding Natural Beauty and an Environmentally Sensitive Area on the Malltraeth estuary. The estate contains woodland, terraced and walled kitchen gardens, a large circular dovecote, a lawn and a deer park. The house was completed between 1779 and 1782, and significant additions were made in the mid-nineteenth century.

== History ==
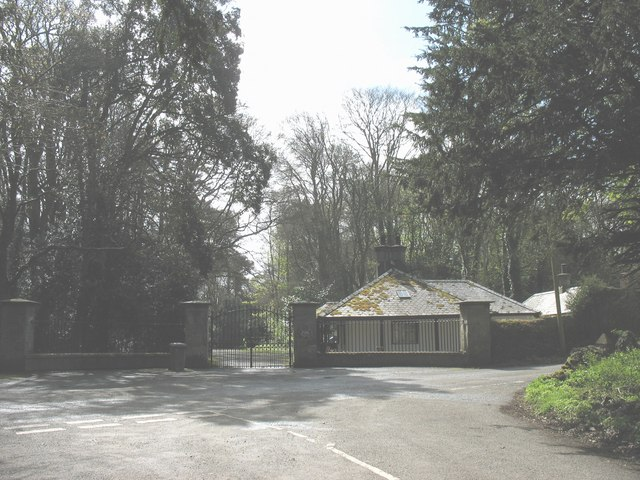
The Front Lodge of Bodorgan Hall

Bodorgan has existed for over a thousand years. During the medieval period, it was an estate belonging to the bishops of Bangor. Probably at the time Rowland Meyrick was Bishop of Bangor (1559–66), the estate became demesne land of the Meyrick family, one of the most powerful families on Anglesey. A Tudor mansion was built with sprawling gardens, which can be seen on an estate map drawn by Lewis Morris in 1724. This building was demolished in 1779 to make way for a new house, outbuildings and a poultry court, designed by the architect John Cooper for Owen Putland Meyrick and built in 1779–82. The design shows some similarities to Baron Hill House in Beaumaris, Anglesey, in which Cooper had been employed as an assistant to Samuel Wyatt, working for Lord Bulkeley.

Owen Fuller Meyrick inherited Bodorgan Hall in 1825 and made extensive changes to the driveway and gardens, and moved the entrance to the north of the house instead of the east. He was responsible for building the porch and forecourt before his death in 1876.

In October 1926, Anglesey's first record of the lesser spotted woodpecker was reported at Bodorgan Hall.

Prince William and Catherine (then-Duke and Duchess of Cambridge) lived in a four-bedroom cottage on the estate from 2010 to 2013, paying £750 per month in rent. Their son, Prince George (b. July 2013), spent his first months on the estate.

Today, the hall is the home of Sir George Meyrick and his wife, Lady Candida Tapps Gervis Meyrick.

== Architecture ==
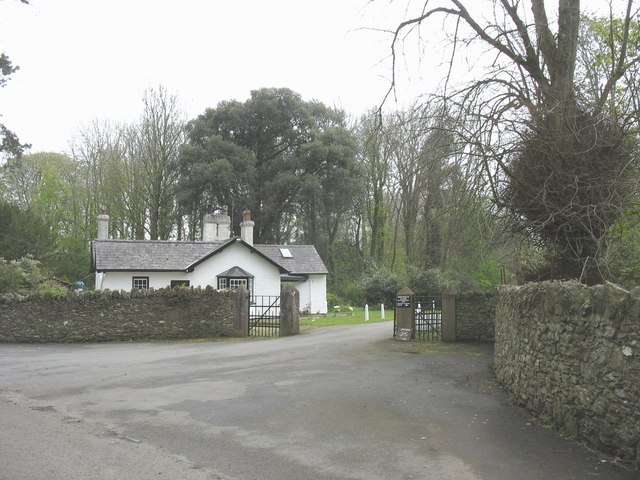
The Back Lodge of Bodorgan Hall

Bodorgan is a neo-classical mansion, "built of smooth ashlar masonry in a pale, yellowish stone, with a slate roof." The entrance to the house is on the north front, which has a portico in the centre. The tops of two doors of the facade are adorned with bas-reliefs and there are half-columns and four alcoves along this side. The east front of the house has nine bays, with three in the centre "on a semi-circular bow with a domed roof." The north and south sides have single-storey wings, added in the mid 19th century, and are of a lesser quality. An aviary was once located in the southern extension, which now has "two open-fronted loggias". The house is Grade II* listed.

The terraces of the estate date to the late 1840s. In 1922 the kitchen gardens covered an area of more than three and a half acres but have since been reduced to about two acres. The kitchen gardens contain numerous glasshouses, sheds and walls, largely attributed to the gardener of Bodorgan in the 1850s, Mr Ewing, and became quite famed at the time. An article in the Cottage Gardener in January 1854 described "two perpendicular glass walls 11 feet (3.4 m) high, supported on pillars and about 20 inches (510 mm) apart, with a glass roof" and that peaches, melons, nectarines, apricots and figs were grown in the garden. Beyond the gardens is an orchard, the deer park and the Malltraeth estuary. The park is listed, jointly with the Bodowen Estate, as Grade II* on the Cadw/ICOMOS Register of Parks and Gardens of Special Historic Interest in Wales.

The estate contains a number of old barns and outer buildings. To the north of the house is a stable yard, in front of the coach house, dated to around 1841. A barn situated on the west side of the yard has been converted into a modern office. There are numerous carriage houses and sheds surrounding this.
