= Thomas Glynn =

Thomas Glynn (died 1648) was a Welsh politician who sat in the House of Commons variously between 1624 and 1640. He supported the Parliamentary side in the English Civil War.

Glynn was the son of Sir William Glynn of Glynllifon and his wife Jane Griffith, daughter of John Griffith (of Plas Mawr), Caernarvonshire. He was the brother of John who also became an MP and a judge.

In 1622, Glynn served as High Sheriff of Caernarvonshire and in 1624 was then elected Member of Parliament for Caernarvonshire and was re-elected in 1625. In April 1640, he was again elected MP for Caernarvonshire in the Short Parliament. In the Civil War he supported the parliamentary side and was made governor of Caernarvon Castle after its surrender in 1646.

Glynn died in 1648. He was succeeded at Glynllifon by his son John.

Parliament of England
Preceded by John Griffith	Member of Parliament for Caernarvonshire; 1624–1625	Succeeded by John Griffith
Vacant Parliament suspended since 1629	Member of Parliament for Caernarvonshire; 1640	Succeeded by John Griffith junior
