= Rowland Meyrick =

Welsh bishop

Rowland Meyrick (Merrick) (1505–1566) was a Welsh bishop of Bangor.

== Life ==
Born at Bodorgan in the parish of Llangadwaladr, Anglesey, in 1505, he was the second son of Meyric ab Llewelyn ab Heylin, by Margaret daughter of Rowland ab Hywl, rector of Aberffraw in the same county. He was named after his maternal grandfather, and educated at St Edward Hall, Oxford. He graduated B.C.L. 9 December 1531, and proceeded D.C.L. 17 Feb. 1538. He was principal of New Inn Hall from 1534 to 1536.

In 1541 he obtained preferment at Eglwysael, and was also made precentor of Llandewy-Velfrey, Pembrokeshire. In 1544 he was collated to the vicarage of Stoke-by-Nayland, Suffolk. About 1547 he was appointed chancellor of the diocese of Wells, and in 1550 became canon and chancellor of St David's Cathedral. In this capacity he took a leading part in the struggle between the chapter and Bishop Robert Ferrar. The bishop on his appointment in 1550 found malpractice and theft of church property; and in a letter to the Lord Chancellor Thomas Goodrich accused Meyrick of 'shameless whoredom'; the details were recorded by John Foxe in his Acts and Monuments. Meyrick consequently refused to acknowledge the bishop's authority to make a visitation of the cathedral, and led the chapter in a factious opposition. Articles were exhibited against the bishop, containing vague accusations and Ferrar was on a charge of praemunire committed to prison. He remained there until Mary I of England came to the throne, and he was sent to the stake for another series of offences. Of the bishop's three bitterest enemies, Thomas Young and George Constantine asked for his pardon before his martyrdom in 1555, but Meyrick did not.

The accession of Mary, shortly followed by Meyrick's marriage in 1554 to Catherine, daughter of Owen Barret of Gellyswick and Hascard, Pembrokeshire, put a stop to Meyrick's advancement, and he was ejected from his canonry at St. David's. On Elizabeth's accession, however, he was, with Richard Davies and Thomas Young, commissioned to visit the four Welsh dioceses, as well as Hereford and Worcester, and on 21 December 1559 he was consecrated by Parker to the see of Bangor in succession to William Glynn. He took the oath of allegiance on 1 March 1560, and in the same year received a commission from his metropolitan to visit the diocese. The following January, being then on a visit to London, he ordained five priests and five readers in Bow Church. He was shortly afterwards appointed a member of the council of the marches. With his see he held the prebend of Trevlodau and the rectories of Llanddewy-Brefi and Llanddewy-Velfrey, to which he added in 1562 the rectory of Llanbedrog, Carnarvonshire. He died on 24 January 1566, and was buried at Bangor, but his monument has disappeared.

== Family ==
Meyrick left four sons: Gelli Meyrick, Francis, Harry, and John. Francis, like his elder brother, served under and was knighted by the Earl of Essex in Ireland, died in 1603, and was buried in the Priory Church of Monkton, Pembroke, where his monument was destroyed during the civil wars; he was grandfather of Sir John Meyrick (died 1659) . He is a member of the Meyrick family.
