= Presaddfed Hall =

Hall, former manor estate on the Isle of Anglesey

Coordinates: 53°17′59″N 4°28′35″W

Presaddfed Hall is a small Grade II* listed country house that stands amongst woodlands to the northeast of Bodedern, Wales, at the southern tip of Llyn Llywenan. Today the hall is a self-catering accommodation for rent. A walled garden lies to the east of the house.

== The hall's history ==
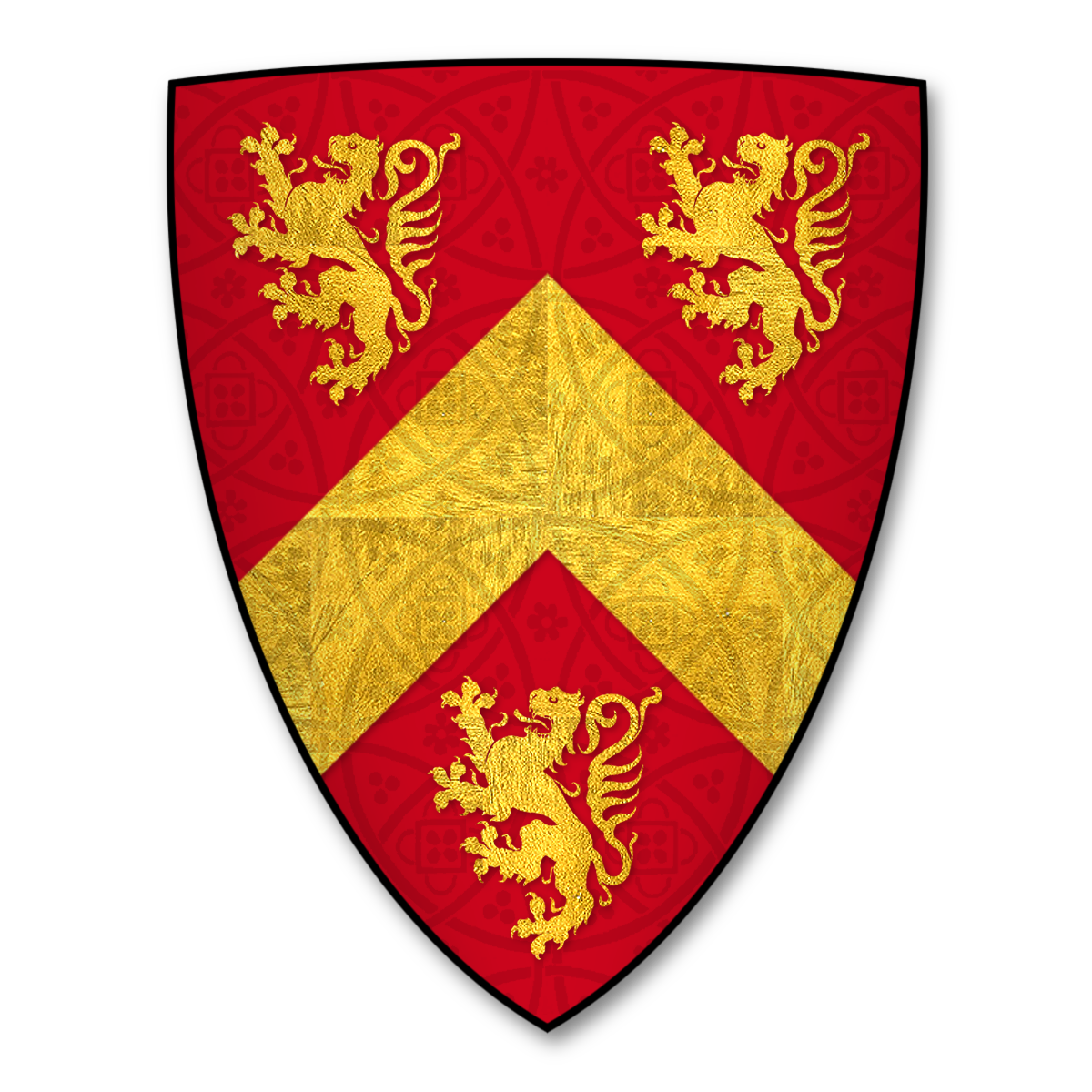
Coat of Arms of Hwfa ap Cynddelw

The manor was originally owned by Hwfa Ap Cynddelw, circa 1100. Hwfa was once considered a man of rank and the wealthiest man on the island of Anglesey and was one of the founding members of the Fifteen Tribes of Wales. Hwfa was a part of the royal court of Aberffraw, and had been seneschal to the King of Gwynedd, and represented Owain Gwynedd during a coronation of the Gwynedd Prince. Centuries later, the Lewis family made Presaddfed their family seat. William Lewis (born 1526) is an example of one of the owners, Lewis served as High Sheriff of Anglesey, and was a politician holding public offices in parliament. Now, the current house was built and extended by the Owen family from the 17th century onwards for over two centuries. The main block was built in 1686, another house adjoining was built in 1821, and then the two houses were linked in 1875 by William Owen Stanley.

=== Associated families ===
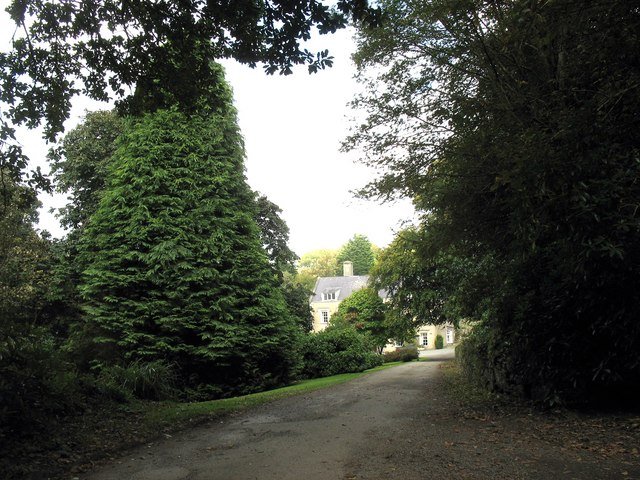
Presaddfed Hall

The house passed through successive owners who descended from Hwfa Ap Cynddelw. In recent times, the Stanley family would inherit Presaddfed through marriage to the Owens of Presaddfed. The Stanleys also inherited the Penrhos estate on Holy island nearby. William Owen Stanley was a member of the Barons Stanley of Alderley. The descendants of Presaddfed would marry into several other Welsh aristocratic families, amongst others, these families included:

- Stanley family of Penrhos
- Barons Trevor family of Brynkinalt
- Owen baronets
- Baron Harlech
- Puleston family
- Williams baronets of Bodelwyddan
- Wynn family of Plas Bodewryd
- Bulkeleys of Gronant, Anglesey.
