= Rowland Ap Meredydd =

16th-century Welsh politician

Rowland Ap Meredydd (by 1529 – 1600 or later), of Bodowyr in Llanidan, Anglesey, was a Welsh politician.

He was a member (MP) of the parliament of England for Anglesey in 1558 and 1559.
