= Owen Lewis =

Owen Lewis may refer to:

- Owen Lewis (rugby league) (born 1988), Welsh rugby league player
- Owen Lewis (bishop) (1532–1594), Welsh Roman Catholic jurist, administrator, diplomat and bishop

== See also ==
- Lewis Owen (disambiguation)
- Henry Owen Lewis (1842–1913), Irish Member of Parliament for Carlow Borough 1874–80
