= Owen Holland (MP) =

Member of the Parliament of England

Owen Holland (died 1601), of Plas Berw, Llanidan, Anglesey, was a Welsh politician.

He was the only son of Edward Holland of Plas Berw, Llanidan, Anglesey.

He was a member (MP) of the Parliament of England for Anglesey in 1584 and High Sheriff of Anglesey for 1590 and 1598.

He married Elizabeth, the daughter of Sir Richard Bulkeley, with whom he had eight sons and five daughters.
