= Richard Williams-Bulkeley =

Richard Williams-Bulkeley may refer to:

- Sir Richard Williams-Bulkeley, 10th Baronet (1801–1875)
- Sir Richard Lewis Mostyn Williams-Bulkeley, 11th Baronet (1833–1884) of the Williams-Bulkeley Baronets
- Sir Richard Williams-Bulkeley, 12th Baronet (1862–1942), Lord Lieutenant of Anglesey
- Sir Richard Williams-Bulkeley, 13th Baronet (1911–1992), Lord Lieutenant of Anglesey and Lord Lieutenant of Gwynedd
- Sir Richard Thomas Williams-Bulkeley, 14th Baronet (b. 1939) of the Williams-Bulkeley Baronets

== See also ==
- Richard Bulkeley (disambiguation)
