= William Lewis (MP for Anglesey) =

William Lewis (1526-1601?) was an MP for Anglesey.

== Early life ==
He was the first son of Hugh Lewis of Presaddfed Hall and his mother was Agnes, daughter of Sir William Gruffydd of Penrhyn. Between the deaths of his father and grandfather he was the ward of John Puleston.

== Career ==
=== Offices held ===
He was Sheriff of Anglesey in 1548–9, 1557-8 and 1571–2. He was commissioner of relief in 1550. He was commissioner of goods of churches and fraternities in 1553.

=== Official records ===
He makes few appearances in official records until the reign of Edward VI, though later records show he leases of lands to him in Anglesey started before the end of the reign of Henry VII.

He was a plaintiff in the Star Chamber against Richard and Thomas Bulkeley concerning the making of a mill dam. The dispute was part of a developing row between Lewis and Sir Richard Bulkeley. Lewis and Bulkeley were cousins.

=== MP ===
Lewis was elected to the first parliament of Mary I, which was disputed by Sir Richard Bulkeley. Bulkeley claimed the sheriff had falsely returned Lewis despite Bulkeley getting the majority of votes.

In the actions by the attorney-general of the Exchequer and Bulkeley himself the judgements went against the sheriff and thus against Lewis. By the time the common pleas reached their conclusion in Trinity term 1555 Bulkeley had twice been elected for Anglesey after Lewis.

It isn't known if Bulkeley ran for parliament in autumn 1555, but Lewis was returned as MP.

The feud between Lewis and Bulkeley continued and it was deplored by Wiliam Llŷn in a poem of 1560 as poisoning the social life of the island.

Lewis was not among the members of the first Marian parliament to oppose the restoration of Catholicism. Neither was he one of the fourth Marian parliaments known to have voted against government bills.

Twenty years later he was listed as a Catholic by an agent of Mary, Queen of Scots. He was however able to serve the Elizabethan regime.

== Personal life ==
He married Margaret, daughter of John Puleston MP. They had three sons and seven daughters. His second marriage was to Ellen, daughter of Edward ap Hugh Gwyn of Plas Bodewryd. They had one son and one daughter.
