= Richard Williams (of Rhosygeido) =

Welsh landowner and politician

Richard Williams was a Welsh landowner and politician who sat in the House of Commons from 1621 to 1622.

Williams was the elder son of William ap Shon ap John ap Gruffydd of Rhosygeido. He was admitted a member of Gray's Inn on 6 February 1593. In 1617, he was High Sheriff of Anglesey. He was of Llys Dulas and Rhosygeido In 1621, he was elected Member of Parliament for Anglesey.

Williams married firstly Marsby Lloyd heiress of Llys Dulas. He married secondly Elin Wynn daughter of John Wynn, (son of Owen Wynn of Gaer Milwr). His third wife was Margaret Meredith widow of Owen Meredith M.D, and daughter of Owen Holland of Berw.

Parliament of England
| Preceded by Sir Richard Bulkeley | Member of Parliament for Anglesey; 1621 | Succeeded by John Mostyn |
