= Lewis ab Owen ap Meurig =

Lewis ab Owen ap Meurig (by 1524 – 1590) of Brondeg, near Newborough, Anglesey, Wales, was a Welsh politician.

== Career ==
He was elected a Member of Parliament (MP) for Anglesey 1553 and 1572 and appointed Sheriff of Anglesey for 1558–1559.

Political offices
Unknown	Custos Rotulorum of Anglesey ?–1558	Succeeded by Sir Richard Bulkeley
