= John Owen (MP for Anglesey and Beaumaris) =

Welsh Whig politician

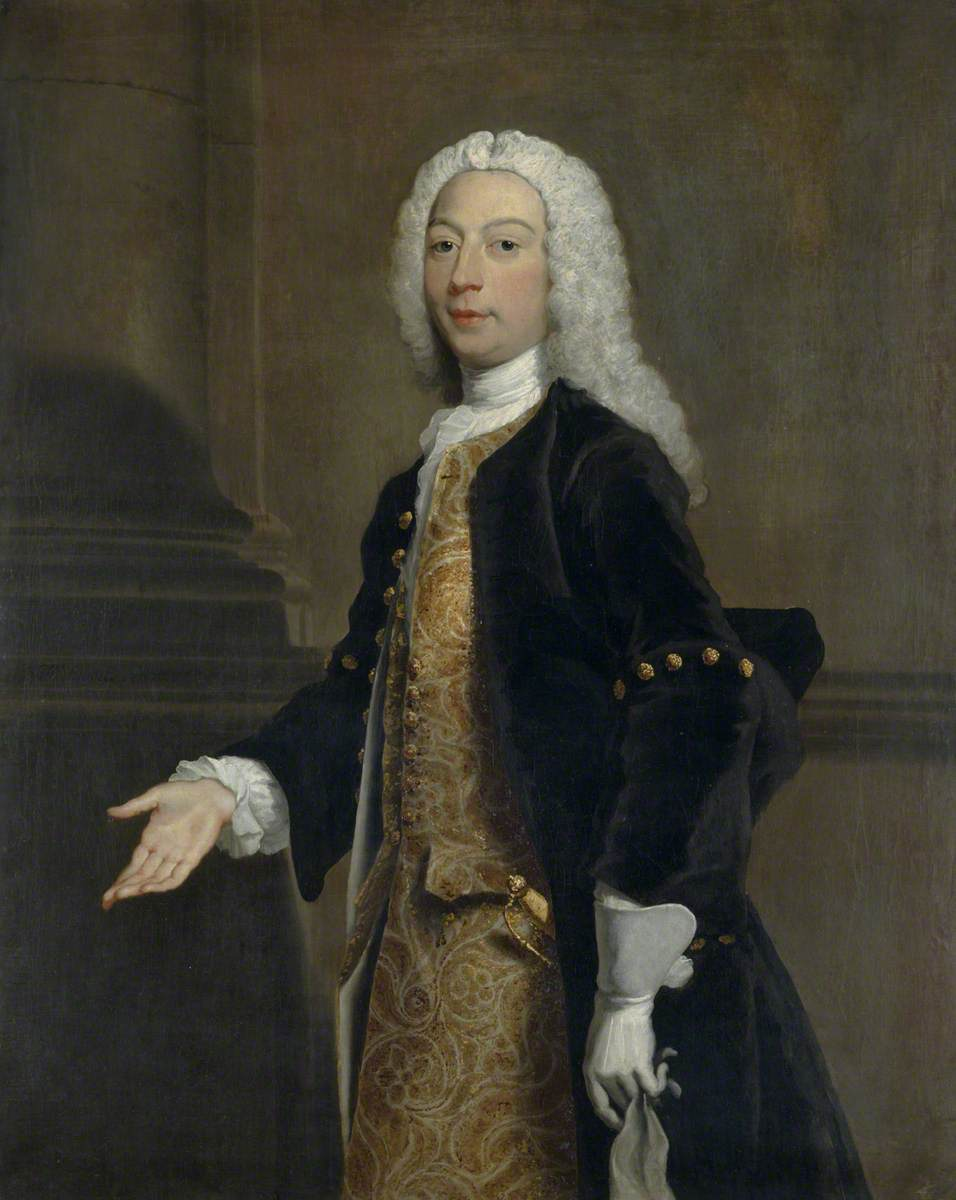

John Owen (c.1702 – 20 February 1754) was a Welsh Whig politician.

He was appointed High Sheriff of Anglesey for 1725. He was a Member of Parliament (MP) for Anglesey 28 May 1741 – 16 Jul 1747 and Beaumaris 29 Jan 1753 – 22 Apr 1754.

He died in 1754 whilst travelling to London.

Parliament of Great Britain
Preceded by Sir Nicholas Bayly, Bt	Member of Parliament for Anglesey; 1741–1747	Succeeded by Sir Nicholas Bayly, Bt
Preceded by The 6th Viscount Bulkeley	Member of Parliament for Beaumaris; 1753–1754	Succeeded by Richard Thelwall Price
