= Richard Davies (MP) =

Welsh businessman, ship-owner and nonconformist Liberal politician

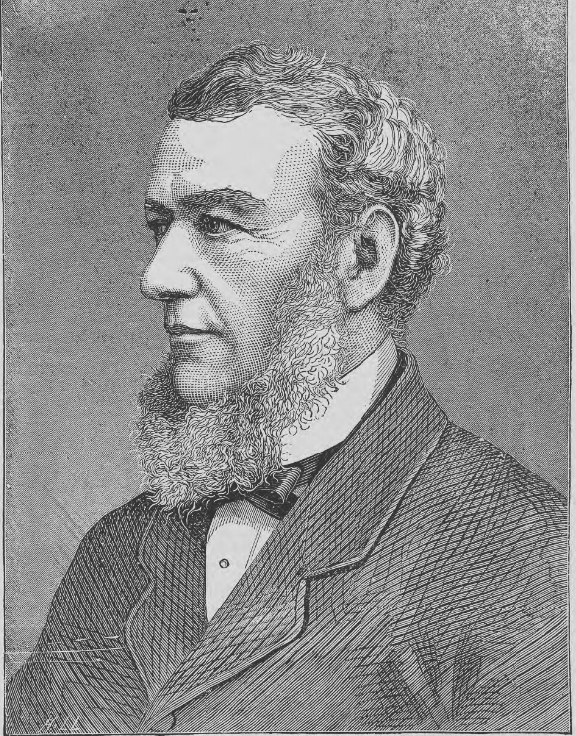
Richard Davies MP circa 1893

Richard Davies (29 November 1818 – 27 October 1896) was a Welsh businessman and ship-owner and nonconformist Liberal politician who sat in the House of Commons from 1868 to 1886.

Davies was born at Llangefni, Anglesey, the son of Richard Davies, a merchant of Llangefni, and his wife Anne Jones of Coed Hywel. He was educated at Llangefni national school. When his father set up subsidiary businesses under the management of his three sons, Richard Davies was assigned to the old ferry-terminal of Porthaethwy, which was reconstituted as Menai Bridge. This timber importing business developed so successfully that all the family became involved and the business developed into large-scale ship-owning which generated considerable wealth, based to a large extent on guano. His brother, Robert, was renowned as a philanthropist.

Davies became a notable figure in politics as a Welsh radical nonconformist. He stood as Liberal candidate for Caernarvon at the 1852 general election but lost by 93 votes. Davies was Anglesey's first Nonconformist J.P. and was High Sheriff of Anglesey in 1858. He was elected unopposed as the Member of Parliament (MP) for Anglesey in the election of 1868. He retained the seat till the 1886 general election, when he retired, being opposed to the proposal for Irish Home Rule.

At one time Davies lived at Bwlch-y-fen, but afterwards at Treborth, opposite Menai Bridge and was a benefactor to Bangor Normal College and to the ‘British’ schools. He was appointed Lord Lieutenant of Anglesey in 1884.

Davies died at Treborth at the age of 77 and was buried in Llandysilio churchyard. Famously his final words are reputed to be "cannot be fathomed". A memorial to him is in the Menai Bridge English Presbyterian Church alongside memorials to other members of the family. ..(The Davies' family was closely associated with this church, it having been built at Robert's expense.)

Davies married Anne Rees, daughter of Rev. Henry Rees of Liverpool and niece of William Rees in 1855 and had several children, among whom were

- Henry Rees Davies.
- Beatrice Conway Davies, who married in 1902 Richard Hughes.

== External ==
- Hansard 1803–2005: contributions in Parliament by Richard Davies

Parliament of the United Kingdom
Preceded by Sir Richard Williams-Bulkeley, Bt	Member of Parliament for Anglesey; 1868–1892	Succeeded by Thomas Lewis
Honorary titles
Preceded by John Thomas Roberts	High Sheriff of Anglesey; 1858–1859	Succeeded by Henry Owen Williams
Preceded by William Owen Stanley	Lord Lieutenant of Anglesey; 1884–1896	Succeeded by Sir Richard Williams-Bulkeley, Bt
