= Richard Wood (Welsh politician) =

Richard Wood (died 1657) was a Welsh politician who sat in the House of Commons from 1646 to 1648.

Wood was the son of Owen Wood of Rhosmor. In 1646, he was elected Member of Parliament for Anglesey in the Long Parliament. He was appointed High Sheriff of Anglesey on 21 January 1656.

Wood married Catherine Bulkeley, daughter of Thomas Bulkeley, 1st Viscount Bulkeley on 22 October 1655. They had no family.

Parliament of England
Preceded by John Bodvel	Member of Parliament for Anglesey; 1646–1648	Succeeded by Not represented in Barebones Parliament
