= John Griffith (of Llŷn) =

Welsh politician (died c. 1650)

John Griffith was a Welsh politician who sat in the House of Commons from 1640. He supported the Royalist cause in the English Civil War.

Griffith was the eldest son of John Griffith and his wife May Trevor, daughter of Sir Richard Trevor of Trevalyn. He was of Llŷn. In November 1640, he was elected member of parliament for Caernarfonshire in the Long Parliament and sat until August 1642 when he was disabled from sitting.

Griffith died unmarried in Paris before 1661.

Parliament of England
Preceded by Thomas Glynn	Member of Parliament for Caernarfonshire; 1640–1642	Succeeded by Sir Richard Wynn, 4th Baronet
