= Cromlech, Anglesey =

Area of Mechell, Ynys Môn, Wales

Coordinates: 53°23′56″N 4°28′00″W

Cromlech
- Location within Anglesey
- OS grid reference: SH 3610 9195
  - Cardiff: 143.3 mi (230.6 km)
  - London: 224.6 mi (361.5 km)
- Community: Mechell
- Principal area: Anglesey
- Country: Wales
- Sovereign state: United Kingdom
- Post town: Amlwch
- Police: North Wales
- Fire: North Wales
- Ambulance: Welsh
- UK Parliament: Ynys Môn
- Senedd Cymru – Welsh Parliament: Ynys Môn

Cromlech is an area in the community of Mechell, in the north of Anglesey island, Wales. It is 101 miles (163 km) west of Liverpool and 207 miles (333 km) north of Cardiff.

== See also ==
- List of localities in Wales by population
