= Richard Bulkeley (died 1621) =

Welsh politician

Sir Richard Bulkeley (1533 – 28 June 1621) of Beaumaris, Anglesey and Lewisham, was a Welsh politician and courtier of Elizabeth Tudor, who sat in the House of Commons of England in 1563 and from 1604 to 1614.

== Life ==
Bulkeley was the eldest son of Sir Richard Bulkeley, of Beaumaris and Anglesey by his first wife, Margaret (née Savage).

He was appointed Constable of Beaumaris Castle in 1561 and elected the first Mayor of Beaumaris in 1562. In 1563, he was elected Member of Parliament for Anglesey, a position he obtained through the influence of his father. He was appointed High Sheriff of Anglesey for 1570. His father's sudden death gave rise to much scandal: he was on very bad terms with his stepmother Agnes Needham and accused her of poisoning his father. While Agnes had undoubtedly been unfaithful to her husband, there is no evidence that she was guilty of murder, and the jury acquitted her.

Bulkeley was knighted in Whitehall, London in 1577, and became embroiled in various power struggles in Wales including with the Earl of Leicester and Owen Wood of Rhosmor.

Wood accused him of oppressing the townspeople of Beaumaris, and being involved with the 1586 Babington Plot. Bulkeley was exonerated by the Privy Council on these charges, but was censured in the Star Chamber for molesting Wood. He is known for being a courtier of Queen Elizabeth, and entertained her in Lewisham – see Honor Oak. She appointed him one of the Council of the Marches of Wales in 1602.

In 1604 Bulkeley was elected MP for Anglesey again and was re-elected in 1614. He was one of the Council of the Marches of Wales again in 1617. In 1618, he founded the family seat at Baron Hill.

Bulkeley was buried at Beaumaris on 28 June 1621, aged 88 and was succeeded by his son Richard.

== Family ==
Bulkeley married twice: firstly Catherine (who died 1573), the daughter of Sir William Davenport Kt. of Bramhall Hall, Cheshire, and secondly on 18 February 1576 Mary, the daughter of William Burgh, 2nd Baron Burgh of Gainsborough, de jure 6th Baron Strabolgi and his wife Lady Katherine Clinton, daughter of Edward Clinton, 1st Earl of Lincoln.

His son, Thomas, was created Viscount Bulkeley in 1644, in recognition of his support for the Royalist cause. Three successive viscounts carried the forename Richard.

Bulkeley's younger half-brother was Lancelot Bulkeley, later Archbishop of Dublin.

Of his daughters, Catherine married Sir Edwin Sandys (1561–1629) and Penelope married Sir Edwin Sandys (1591–1623), Catherine's husband being the uncle of Penelope's husband.

Parliament of England
Preceded by Rowland Ap Meredydd	Member of Parliament for Anglesey; 1563	Succeeded by Sir Richard Bulkeley
Preceded by Thomas Holland	Member of Parliament for Anglesey; 1604–1614	Succeeded by Richard Williams
Political offices
Preceded by Sir Richard Bulkeley	Custos Rotulorum of Anglesey bef. 1577 – bef. 1584	Succeeded by The Earl of Leicester
Preceded by The Earl of Leicester	Custos Rotulorum of Anglesey bef. 1594 – 1621	Succeeded by Rowland White
