= Gelli Meyrick =

Sir Gelli Meyrick (also Gelly or Gilly; c. 1556 – 13 March 1601) was a Welsh supporter of Robert Devereux, 2nd Earl of Essex, and conspirator in Essex's Rebellion. He was executed for his part in it.

== Life ==
He was the eldest son of Rowland Meyrick, bishop of Bangor (Gwynedd), by Katherine, daughter of Owain Barret of Gelliswic. After his father's death in 1565 he spent his youth with his mother on the family estate of Hascard in Pembrokeshire. At an early age he became a soldier and served in the Netherlands - a valuable part of the Spanish Empire, receiving in 1583 the grant of a crest.

He soon became acquainted with Robert Devereux, Earl of Essex, who owned extensive lands in South Wales, including Pembrokeshire (Lamphey Bishop's Palace) and Carmarthenshire. He attended the Earl at Flushing in 1585, and joined in the campaigns under Robert Dudley, 1st Earl of Leicester in the Low Countries in that and the following year. On returning to England Essex conferred on him the office of steward in his household. Meyrick went with Essex on the expedition to Portugal in 1589, and two years later accompanied him to Normandy, but sickness prevented him from taking much part in the campaign which Essex conducted on behalf of Henry of Navarre. In 1595 he and another of Essex's followers, Henry Lindley, were jointly presented by the crown, at Essex's suit, with nine parks in the duchy of Lancaster and one in the duchy of Cornwall, besides the manor and castle of Wigmore, Herefordshire and the forest and chase of Bringwood. He thenceforth made Wigmore Castle his chief country residence; his London house was in the parish of St Clement Eastcheap.

The death of Sir Roger Williams gave Meyrick the opportunity to become the most influential of the Earl's supporters. In 1596 Meyrick accompanied Essex on the expedition to Cádiz, serving as lieutenant-colonel in Sir Conyers Clifford's regiment, and also acting as commissioner of stores. Essex knighted him at Cádiz after the capture of the city. On his return in August, Meyrick was officially reported to have brought home as prize some India hides; charges of pilfering in connection with the goods captured from the enemy were brought against him by Sir Anthony Ashley, and he retaliated by accusing Ashley of far more serious peculations. The quarrel ended in Ashley's committal to prison.

In 1597 he took part with Essex in the Islands Voyage, and was in command of the Swiftsure. In the Earl's disputes with Walter Raleigh in the course of the expedition, Meyrick strongly supported his master, and is credited with embittering the relations between the two leaders. In the spring of 1599 Meyrick went to Ireland with Essex, who was then lord-deputy, and he returned with messages from his master in August, a few weeks before Essex himself arrived in London to meet the charges preferred against his Irish administration.

In July 1600 Essex was induced to dismiss Meyrick from his office of steward by friends who represented him as a dangerous counsellor, but he was soon reinstated at Essex House. A month later Essex, once more at liberty, was considering suggestions of rebellion with a view to regaining his hold on the government, and Meyrick entertained in his master's mansion potential supporters. When in January 1601 Essex had decided on raising an insurrection in the city, Meyrick armed many of his country friends with muskets and invited them to London; and he gave 40 shillings to the actors of the Globe Theatre on condition that they performed, on the day (Saturday, 6 February) before the day fixed for the outbreak, the play of Richard II representing the abdication of an English sovereign on the stage (according to many accounts), or (as has been argued) John Hayward's Henry IV. On Sunday (7 February), when Essex left for the city at the head of his armed followers, the defence of Essex House was left in Meyrick's hands, and he acted as gaoler to the members of the privy council (Thomas Egerton, the Earl of Worcester, William Knollys and Lord Justice John Popham) who had arrived earlier in the day to inquire into Essex's movements and had been locked up in the house. Meyrick defended the house when attacked by the royal troops in the afternoon, and only surrendered at Essex's bidding.

He was held in the Tower of London, but, unlike his fellow-prisoners, when examined by the council disclosed little. Brought to trial on 5 March, with Sir Charles Danvers, Sir Christopher Blount, Sir John Davis, and Sir Henry Cuffe, he declined to admit his guilt, but was convicted and sentenced to death. He declared himself willing to die, and explained that he merely acted under his master's orders. In a short speech at the gallows he expressed the hope that others might receive a pardon.

On 13 March 1601 Merrick and Cuffe were hanged at Tyburn and then drawn and quartered by order of Queen Elizabeth. Robert Devereux, 2nd Earl of Essex was beheaded, Henry Wriothesley, 3rd Earl of Southampton, Essex's chief co-conspirator was given a life sentence without parole and sent to the Tower of London.

== Family ==
Gelli was a member of the Meyrick family. Around 1584, Meyrick married Margaret, daughter of Ieuan Lewys of Gladestry, Radnorshire, and widow of John Gwyn of Llanelwedd; she inherited the estates of both her father and first husband. By her Meyrick left a son, Roland, and a daughter, Margaret, wife of John Vaughan, 1st Earl of Carberry. Both children were subsequently restored in blood, and seem to have been granted out of their father's confiscated estates lands at Lucton and Eyton in Herefordshire. Lady Meyrick died in 1625.

== Sources ==
- This article incorporates text from a publication now in the public domain: "Meyrick, Sir Gelly". Dictionary of National Biography. London: Smith, Elder & Co. 1885–1900.
