= John Mostyn (MP for Flintshire) =

Welsh politician

John Mostyn (died 1644) was a Welsh politician who sat in the House of Commons at various times between 1625 and 1640.

Mostyn was the son of Sir Roger Mostyn of Mostyn. In 1624 he was elected Member of Parliament for Anglesey. He was entered at Middle Temple in November 1637.

In April 1640, Mostyn was elected MP for Flintshire in the Short Parliament. He was re-elected MP for Flintshire for the Long Parliament in November 1640. He was disabled from sitting in parliament for supporting the King on 5 February 1644. He was assessed at £1,000 by the Committee for the Advance of Money on 28 July 1644.

Mostyn died unmarried at his seat at Maesmynau in 1644.

Parliament of England
Preceded by Richard Williams	Member of Parliament for Anglesey; 1624	Succeeded by Sir Sackville Trevor
Vacant Parliament suspended since 1629	Member of Parliament for Flintshire; 1640	Succeeded by John Trevor
