= Hugh Hughes (MP) =

Member of the Parliament of England

Hugh Hughes (died 1609), of Plas Coch, Porthamel, Anglesey, was a Welsh politician.

He was the eldest son of David Lloyd ap Hugh of Porthamel Isa and the first person in the family to adopt a surname (Hughes). He was educated at Cambridge University (1564) and Lincoln's Inn (1571), and was called to the bar in 1580. He succeeded his father in 1574, inheriting the Porthamel Isa estate, on which he built Plas Coch in 1569.

He was appointed a justice of the peace for Anglesey by 1577, for Caernarvonshire and Merioneth by 1591 and High Sheriff of Anglesey for 1580–81, 1591–92 and 1599–1600. He was bencher at Lincoln's Inn in 1594, Autumn reader in 1595, and treasurer in 1602–03. He was deputy Queen's attorney for Anglesey, Caernarvonshire and Merioneth in 1589 and 1592 and attorney for Anglesey, Caernarvon, Cheshire, Flintshire and Merioneth in 1596. He was a member of the Council of the Marches of Wales. 1601.

He was elected a member (MP) of the Parliament of England for Anglesey in 1597.

He married Elizabeth, the daughter of Simon Montagu of Brigstock, Northamptonshire and had one son and heir, Roger, and three daughters.
