= Bodorgan railway station =

Railway station in Anglesey, Wales

Bodorgan
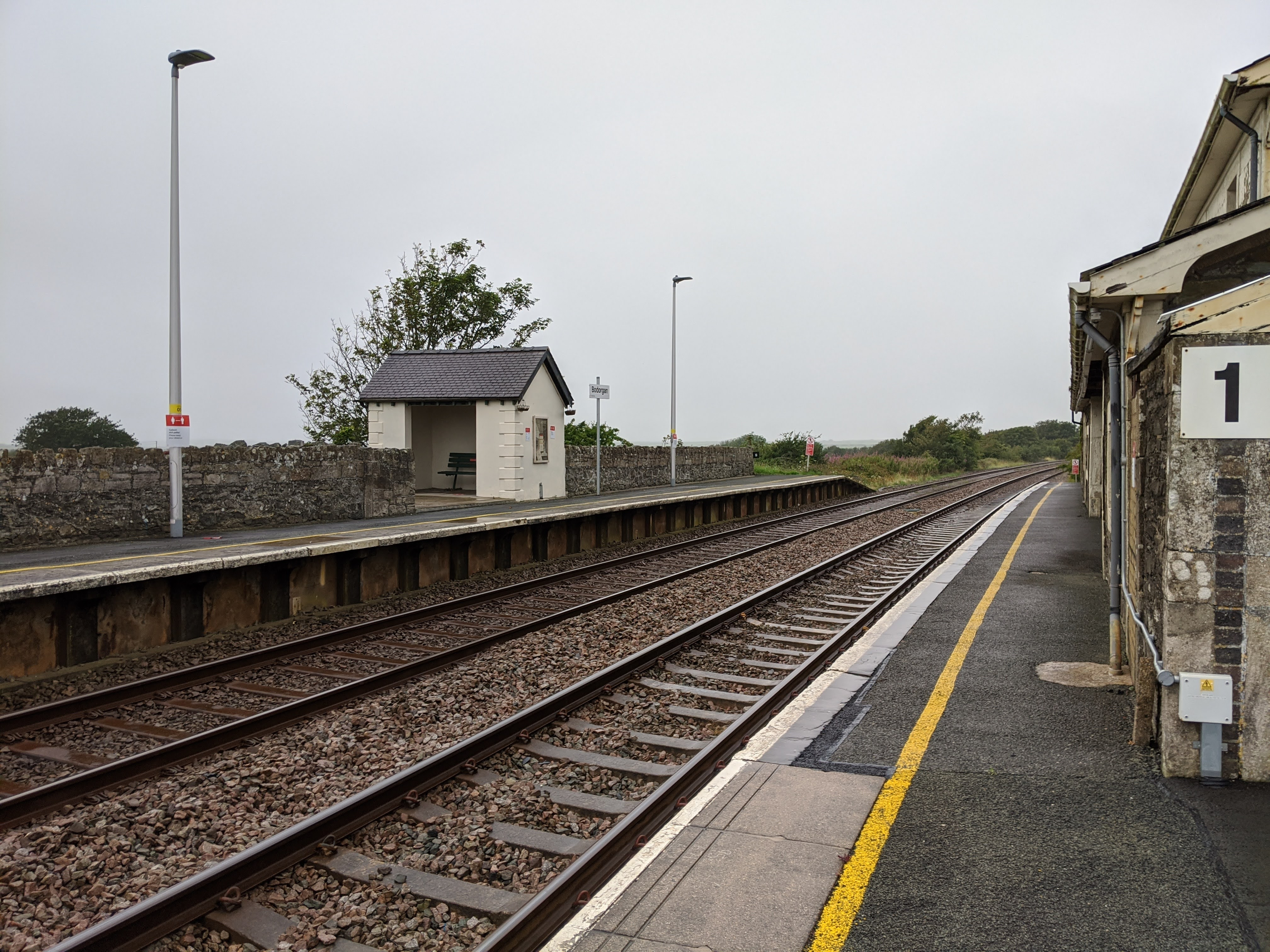
- Bodorgan Railway Station in July 2020

General information
- Location: Bodorgan, Anglesey; Wales
- Coordinates: 53.204°N 4.418°W
- Grid reference: SH386701
- Manager: Transport for Wales Rail
- Platforms: 2

Other information
- Station code: BOR
- Classification: DfT category F2

History
- Opened: October 1849
- Original company: Chester and Holyhead Railway
- Pre-grouping: London and North Western Railway

Passengers
- 2021/22: ▲4,302
- 2022/23: ▲4,956
- 2023/24: ▲6,374
- 2024/25: ▲7,414
- 2025/26: ▲8,110

Listed Building – Grade II
- Feature: Bordorgan Railway Station, main building
- Designated: 26 March 1990
- Reference no.: 5756
Location
Notes
- Passenger statistics from the Office of Rail and Road

Bodorgan railway station serves the hamlet of Bodorgan and the village of Bethel on the Isle of Anglesey, Wales. The stop is an unstaffed halt, and serves as a request stop for Chester and Holyhead-bound local trains along the North Wales coast.

== History ==
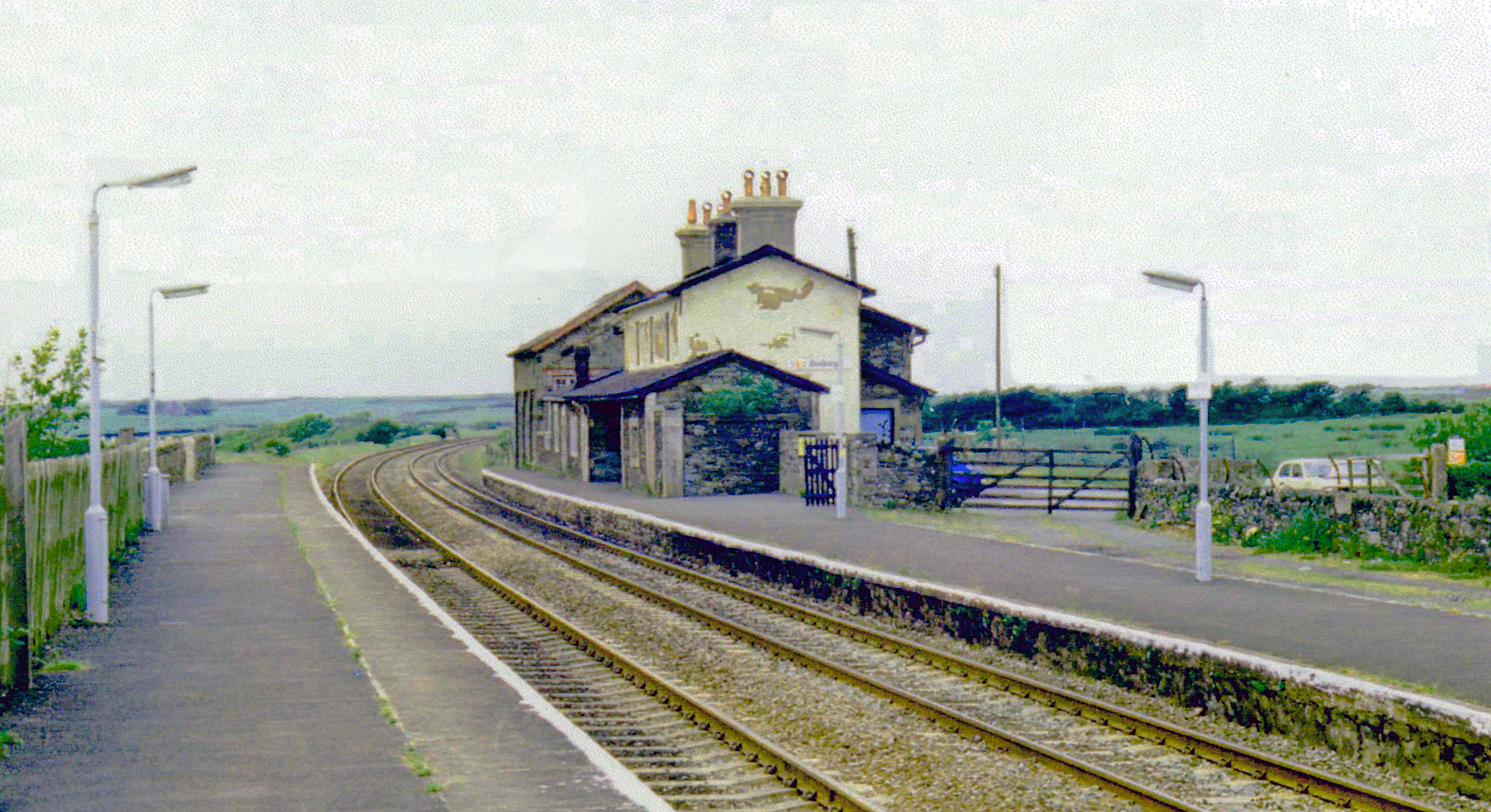
The station in June 1986

The station, which was originally to be called Trefdraeth, was opened in October 1849 and had a small signal box, a small goods yard and a water tower. The goods yard closed in December 1964 but the stationmaster's house remains (now in private use). There are stone-built shelters on both platforms.

At around 05:00 am on 8 February 2011 an unnamed man was hit by a Holyhead-bound train near the station and died at the scene.

== Facilities ==
The station has the same range of amenities as others on this part of the line (CIS screens, timetable poster boards and a payphone). No ticketing facilities are available however, so these must be purchased in advance or on the train. Level access is available to both platforms, though platform 2 is only reachable by a barrow crossing and so care is advised when using it. Platform 1 is very low and portable steps are available to assist passengers when boarding trains.

== Services ==
There is a two-hourly weekday service in each direction from the station. Most eastbound trains run to Wrexham General, Shrewsbury, and Birmingham International, although a small number run to either Crewe or Cardiff.

The Sunday service is irregular (six westbound, seven eastbound) and runs mainly to/from Crewe, with one service to Wrexham and Cardiff.

Preceding station	National Rail	Following station
Llanfairpwll	Transport for Wales Rail North Wales Coast Line	Tŷ Croes

== Sources ==
- Butt, R. V. J. (October 1995). The Directory of Railway Stations: details every public and private passenger station, halt, platform and stopping place, past and present (1st ed.). Sparkford: Patrick Stephens Ltd. ISBN 978-1-85260-508-7. OCLC 60251199. OL 11956311M.
