= Custos Rotulorum of Anglesey =

Civic post in Anglesey, Wales

This is a list of people who have served as Custos Rotulorum of Anglesey.

- Thomas Holte bef. 1544–1546
- Lewis Ab Owen ap Meurig ?–1558
- Sir Richard Bulkeley 1558–1572
- Sir Richard Bulkeley bef. 1577 – bef. 1584
- Robert Dudley, 1st Earl of Leicester bef. 1584–1588
- Sir Richard Bulkeley bef. 1594–1621
- Rowland White 1621–1640
- Sir Arthur Tyringham 1640–1642
- Sir Hugh Owen, 1st Baronet 1642–1643
- John Bodvel 1643–1646
- Interregnum
- Robert Bulkeley, 2nd Viscount Bulkeley 1660–1688
- Nicholas Bagenal 1689–1690
- Richard Bulkeley, 3rd Viscount Bulkeley 1690–1704
- Richard Bulkeley, 4th Viscount Bulkeley 1705–1715
- Owen Meyrick 1715–1759
- Sir Nicholas Bayly, 2nd Baronet 1759–1782

For later custodes rotulorum, see Lord Lieutenant of Anglesey.
