= Richard Bulkeley (died 1640) =

Welsh politician

Richard Bulkeley (died 5 March 1640) was a Welsh politician who sat in the House of Commons between 1626 and 1629.

Bulkeley was the eldest son of Sir Richard Bulkeley of Baron Hill, Llanfaes, Anglesey. He was admitted to Gray's Inn on 23 October 1616. He succeeded to his grandfather's estates in 1621.

He served as justice of the peace for Anglesey and Caernarvonshire from 1626 to his death and was appointed High Sheriff of Anglesey for 1638–39. He was a Sewer extraordinary of the royal chamber from 1629 to his death.

In 1626, Bulkeley was elected member of parliament for Anglesey. He was re-elected MP for Anglesey in 1628 and sat until 1629 when King Charles decided to rule without parliament for eleven years.

Bulkeley died without issue at Carnarvon in 1640. His estates passed to his uncle Thomas Bulkeley.

Parliament of England
Preceded by Sir Sackville Trevor	Member of Parliament for Anglesey; 1626–1629	Parliament suspended until 1640
