= Richard Bulkeley III =

Member of the Parliament of England

Richard Bulkeley, of Llangefni and Porthamel, Llanidan, Anglesey, was a Welsh politician.

He was the eldest son of Rowland Bulkeley of Beaumaris, Anglesey.

He was a justice of the peace for Anglesey from c.1593 and was appointed High Sheriff of Anglesey for 1597–98 and 1601–02. He was elected a member (MP) of the Parliament of England for Anglesey 1589.

He married twice: firstly Mary, the daughter of William Lewis of Presaddfed Hall, Bodedern, with whom he had 4 sons and 5 daughters and secondly Elizabeth, the daughter of Rhys Wynn of Bodychen, Llandrygarn, and possibly the widow of Rowland Bulkeley of Cemlyn, nr. Llanidan, with whom he had two more daughters.
