= Llanidan =

Village and community in Anglesey, Wales

Llanidan: Welsh: Llanidan old church
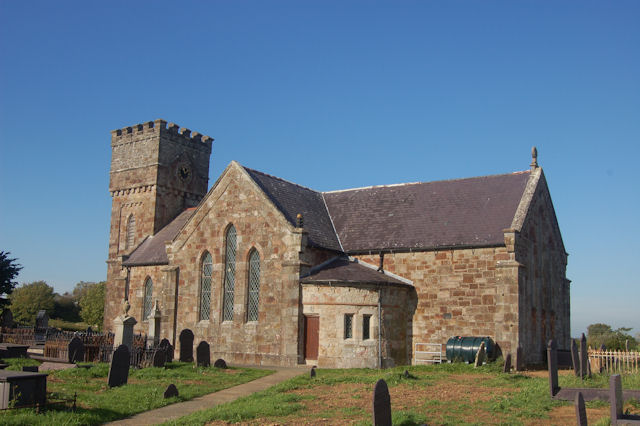

- Location within Anglesey
- Population: 1,019 (2021 Census)
- Principal area: Anglesey
- Preserved county: Gwynedd
- Country: Wales
- Sovereign state: United Kingdom
- Post town: Llanfairpwllgwyngyll
- Postcode district: LL61
- Police: North Wales
- Fire: North Wales
- Ambulance: Welsh
- UK Parliament: Ynys Môn
- Senedd Cymru – Welsh Parliament: Bangor Conwy Môn
- List of places UK Wales Anglesey 53.179°N 4.273°W Map of the community

Llanidan is a village and community in the south of Anglesey, Wales which includes the village of Brynsiencyn. The parish is along the Menai Strait, about 4 miles north-east of Caernarfon (across the strait). The parish church of St Nidan is near the A4080 road, a little to the east of Brynsiencyn. The ruins of an earlier parish church survive.

== History ==
=== Possible site of Roman invasions ===
On the basis of field names it has been suggested that the Roman army under Suetonius Paulinus landed here in 60, and again in 78 under Agricola, overcoming the Ordovices of north-west Wales and Anglesey, at a spot known as Bryn Beddau, (Hill of Graves in Welsh).

In 1867 it was suggested that the local field names "Maes Hir Gad" (Area of long battle) and "Cae Oer Waedd" (Field of cold or bitter lamentation) may indicate the site of these battles

=== Roman coastal settlement ===
Near Tai Cochion house, excavation and geophysical survey has revealed part of a Roman settlement of unusual layout, and on the opposite side of the Menai Strait to the Roman fort at Segontium. This may mark the main crossing of the Menai Strait. A trading settlement would have been likely at such a point.

Geophysical survey indicates a road of typical Roman construction, 600 metres long and 8 metres wide, with several side branches, running slightly north of east from Tai Cochion house to the shore of the Menai Strait. The roads were flanked by a series of small enclosures, with typical dimensions of about 20m x 40m. Many of the enclosures contained fairly clear, rectangular anomalies interpreted as buildings, with typical dimensions of around 16m x 8m. About 25 possible buildings were detected by the survey. Most appeared to be rectangular, possibly with internal subdivisions. A few seemed to be more complex with extensions or additional rooms. The layout, with a central road flanked by plots containing rectangular buildings, is similar to Roman villages and small towns such as Sedgefield. This arrangement has no defences and is otherwise unlike the military Roman sites in Wales, nor does it resemble the native defended settlements with their roundhouses and irregular outlines, nor the occasional villas; it suggests a previously unknown level of civilian Romanization in the remote west of the province. Two other similar layouts in Wales are suggested by aerial photography; on the opposite side of the Menai Strait, adjacent to Foryd Bay, there is a small linear settlement of rectangular buildings, but no others are known from North Wales.

The western and southern parts of the settlement were fairly regular with one building in each plot. The northern and eastern parts were less regular and more difficult to interpret. Two hundred and seven pottery shards were found on the surface of the field to the south of Tai Cochion. These dated from c. 100 to c. 300, including a high proportion of high-status 2nd century material. In the burned level of one building, many shattered Lezoux colour-coated beakers may be the stock of a shop. Several coins were found, the latest was of Constantius II (337–347).

Geophysical survey at the western end of the site shows a large prehistoric defended settlement. The settlement is sub-circular with dimensions of 130m x 100m and is defended by a double bank and ditches. A series of circular anomalies in the interior could indicate several phases of round houses. The probable course of the Roman road runs immediately to the south of the defensive ditches and the entrance appears to open onto the road. The Romans probably improved a pre-existing Iron Age trackway and may have abandoned the Iron Age settlement.

=== Middle Ages ===
In the Middle Ages, the parish was part of the commote of Menai, in cantref Rhosyr.

== Governance ==
A Llanidan electoral ward existed, which also included the community of Llanddaniel Fab to the north. The population of the ward at the 2011 census was 1,851.

Since the 2013 county elections Llanidan has been part of a new ward, Bro Rhosyr, which includes three neighbouring communities and elects two county councillors.

== Landmarks ==
Llanidan Hall is a Grade II* listed building and its garden and park is listed, also at Grade II*, on the Cadw/ICOMOS Register of Parks and Gardens of Special Historic Interest in Wales.

There is a horse stud: Llanidan Stud, which breeds Welsh ponies of cob type (section C) and Welsh cobs (section D). Near Brynsiencyn is the Anglesey Sea Zoo.

== Brynsiencyn ==
Brynsiencyn is a small village, housing a few hundred people. It has a post office, shop, kebab house and pub. There is also a primary school, a church, and a large chapel.

== Notable people ==
Amongst the notable people associated with the parish are:

- Rowland Ap Meredydd (ca.1529 – ca.1600), of Bodowyr in Llanidan, a politician.
- Ellis Ellis-Griffith (1860 – 1926), barrister and Liberal politician, moved to Brynsiencyn as a child.
- Owen Holland (MP) (died 1601), of Plas Berw, Llanidan, a Welsh politician.
- Henry Rowlands (1655–1723), rector of Llanidan who published work on agriculture and local history.
- Thomas Williams of Llanidan (1737–1802) Member of Parliament and industrialist, lived in Plas Llanidan
- Carwyn Williams (born 1965) an ex-professional surfer from the Mumbles, lived here for a period of time.
