= Baron Hill, Anglesey =

House and park in Beaumaris, Anglesey, Wales

Baron Hill is a country estate in Beaumaris, Anglesey, Wales. The ruined Baron Hill House and the associated Baron Hill Park were established in 1618 by Sir Richard Bulkeley as the family seat of the influential Bulkeley family. Parts of the park are a site of special scientific interest.

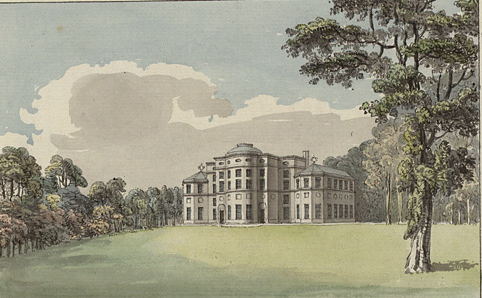
Baron Hill, Anglesey, the seat of the Bulkeley family, in 1776. Now a ruin.

== Baron Hill House ==
The original Baron Hill mansion was built by Sir Richard Bulkeley in 1612. However, he died before the completion of the house and it was not finished to his specifications. During the English Civil War, Richard Bulkeley's successor, Colonel Thomas Bulkeley (later Thomas Bulkeley, 1st Viscount Bulkeley), is said to have invited King Charles I to take possession of the house and set up his court there. In the early eighteenth century the house was the seat of Richard Bulkeley, 4th Viscount Bulkeley who maintained Jacobite sympathies.

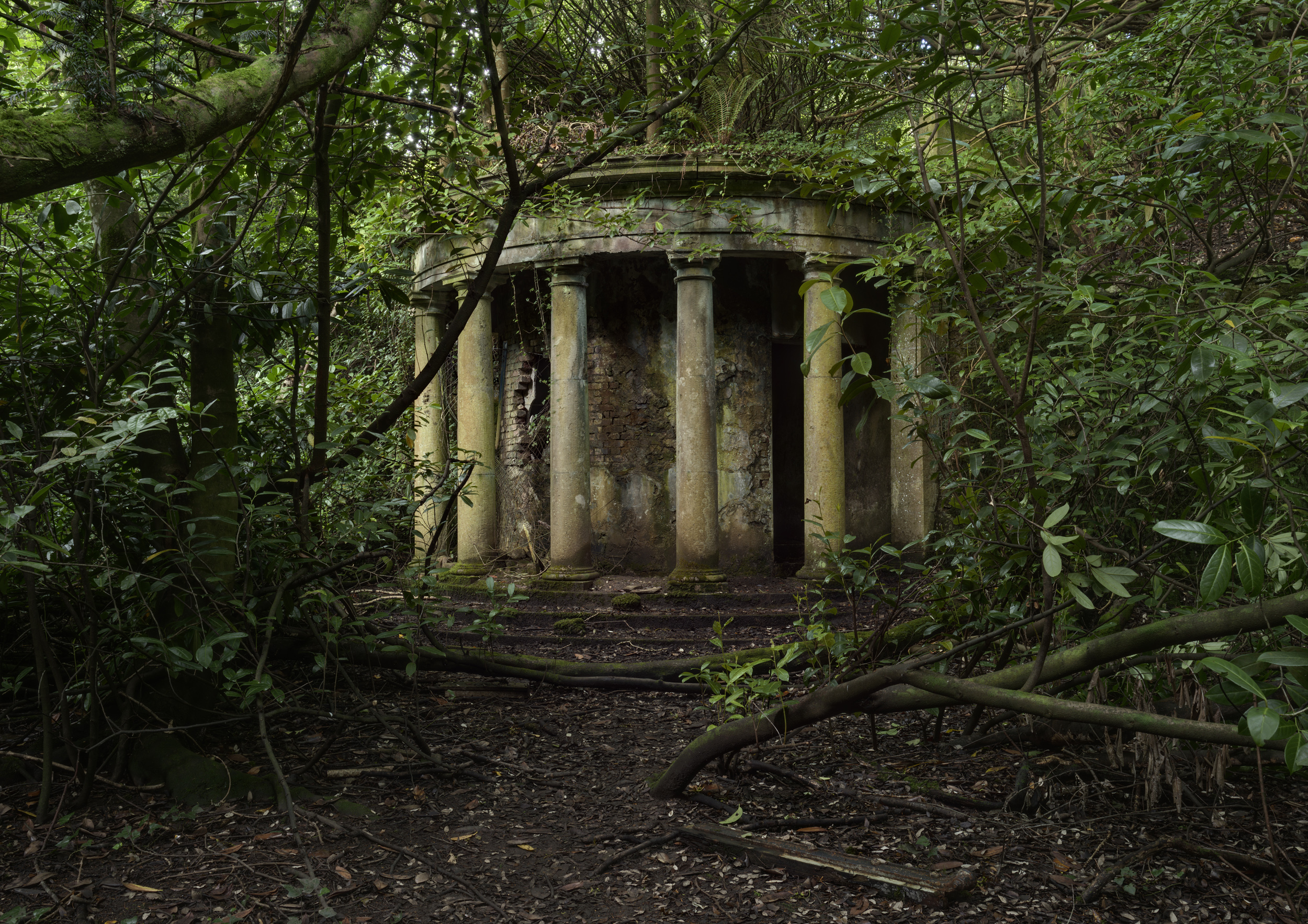
A colonnade in the grounds of Baron Hill

The house was reconstructed in 1776 by architect Samuel Wyatt in a Neo-Palladian style as is obvious from the curved facade of the current ruined building to the terraces, follies and balconies. There is also an icehouse in the gardens and a lodge house. In the nineteenth century the occupants of Baron Hill remained the dominant Anglesey landowners, possessing estate also at Llanfairfechan and other parts of Caernarfonshire.

During World War I, death duties soaked up the family fortune and made it impossible for the family (by then called Williams-Bulkeley) to continue to maintain the house. During the war, Royal Engineers were stationed at the house. In 1939 at the outbreak of World War II, the mansion was requisitioned by the government and used as a temporary housing for Polish soldiers. The Polish soldiers found the home too cold and decided to start a fire within the mansion so they would be moved to new housing accommodations. The fire destroyed a large part of the interior and the soldiers were removed from the house but only to tents on the Baron Hill Estate grounds. The mansion was abandoned afterwards and is still abandoned and derelict to this day.

The mansion and grounds are on private property and there is no public access

The Bulkeley Memorial (at 53°16′21″N 4°06′49″W) was built on the crest of Baron Hill in 1875. A golf course was added in the 1880s, and Baron Hill Golf Club occupies non-woodland areas of the estate.

In August 2008, plans were submitted to restore the house and turn it into luxury apartments.

== Baron Hill Park ==
Baron Hill Park
- Site of Special Scientific Interest
- Location within Wales
- Location of Baron Hill Park.
- Area of search: Anglesey
- Grid reference: SH6057976917
- Coordinates: 53.27086°N 4.092125°W
- Interest: Biological
- Area: 112.43 ha (277.8 acres)
- Notification date: 1980

Baron Hill Park is an area of parkland north of Beaumaris. It is part of the ancestral land-holding of the Bulkeley family and contains the ruins of the former ancestral home, Baron Hill.

Some 112 Ha of parkland is a designated site of special scientific interest largely because the woodland has remained largely undisturbed over very many years and is now host to a very wide range of lichen species, mostly epiphytic on trees. The designation also reflected the species range of the lichens which are typical of a high-sunlight, low rainfall environment which is much more typical of southern England but is also characteristic of the benign micro-climate found in parts of Anglesey.

This park-land is privately owned and does not have public access. It is within the Anglesey Area of Outstanding Natural Beauty.
