= Bodorgan =

Village and community in Anglesey, Wales

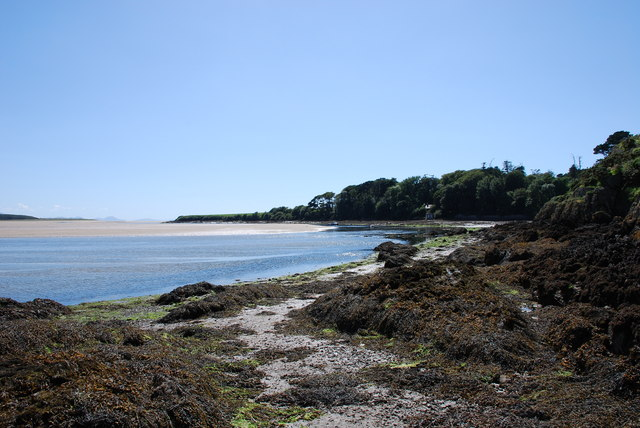
- Malltraeth Sands at Bodorgan

- Location within Anglesey
- Population: 921 (2011)
- OS grid reference: SH389675
- Community: Bodorgan
- Principal area: Anglesey
- Preserved county: Gwynedd
- Country: Wales
- Sovereign state: United Kingdom
- Post town: BODORGAN
- Postcode district: LL62
- Dialling code: 01407
- Police: North Wales
- Fire: North Wales
- Ambulance: Welsh
- UK Parliament: Ynys Môn
- Senedd Cymru – Welsh Parliament: Bangor Conwy Môn
- List of places UK Wales Anglesey 53.180°N 4.410°W Map of the community

Bodorgan is a village and community on the Isle of Anglesey, Wales, United Kingdom. According to the 2001 Census, there were 1,503 residents in the now former electoral ward, 72.7% of them being able to speak Welsh. This increased to 1,704 at the 2011 Census but only 67.72% of this increased population were Welsh speakers.

The village is served by Bodorgan railway station, which is located near the hamlets of Bethel and Llangadwaladr to the north-west, which are in the community, as is Malltraeth. It lies on an unclassified road to the southwest of the village of Hermon, through which the A4080 road passes. To the east and south of Bodorgan lies the estuary of the Afon Cefni and the extensive Malltraeth Sands.

Bodorgan Hall is the largest country estate in Anglesey. The house, dovecote and a barn are Grade II listed buildings. The reasons given for listing the house are that it is a "site in a magnificent coastal position, which retains many of its original characteristics, having well preserved formal terraces; deer park still in use; substantial remains of extensive and once well known walled kitchen gardens; other, less formal, designed garden areas which have partially survived, including some planting; woodland and shooting coverts; large circular brick dovecote and other buildings of interest." Until 2013, the Duke and Duchess of Cambridge lived in a farmhouse on the Bodorgan Estate during the time when Prince William was serving as a search-and-rescue helicopter pilot based at RAF Valley nearby.

The village hosted several matches of the 2019 Inter Games Football Tournament, a replacement football tournament for the popular Island Games. The games were held in Gibraltar but due to lack of pitches there Anglesey was deemed to be a better host.

The former RAF Bodorgan is nearby.

== Governance ==
The local government ward of Bodorgan, including the village of Llangadwaladr and a number of other small hamlets, had a total of 900 inhabitants, increasing slightly to 921 at the 2011 Census. However, following the 2012 Isle of Anglesey electoral boundary changes Bodorgan became part of a larger Bro Aberffraw ward with the neighbouring communities of Aberffraw and Rhosyr.

In November 2012, 101-year old Bodorgan community councillor, Mary Edwards MBE, was the UK's oldest community councillor. She had represented Bodorgan on Aethwy District Council between 1948 and 1974, subsequently serving on Anglesey County Council until 1996.

In December 2025, 93-year-old Myfyr Davies was recognised for serving as a Bodorgan community councillor for over 70 years, having first been elected when he was 21.
