= John Griffith (of Plas Mawr) =

Welsh lawyer and politician

John Griffith (died 1609) was a Welsh politician who sat in the House of Commons from 1571 to 1609.

Griffith was the son of William Griffith (died 1587) of Plas Mawr, Caernarfon.

He became a Fellow of All Souls College, Oxford in 1548 and was awarded B.C.L. in 1551 and his doctorate in 1563. In 1559 he took over the office of Regius professor of civil law at Oxford, which he held till 1566. He was also Principal of New Inn Hall from 1561 to 1564 after which he was admitted to Doctors' Commons.

He first entered Parliament in 1571 as the member for Caernarfon, and was re-elected in 1572. He was appointed Sheriff of Caernarvonshire for 1582 and Sheriff of Anglesey for 1587 and 1593. In 1604, he was again elected Member of Parliament for Caernarfon and sat until his death in 1609.

He married Margaret, the daughter of Rhys Thomas of Aber and widow of Edward Griffith of Penrhyn. They had four sons, including Nicholas and William Griffith, and 3 daughters.

Parliament of England
Preceded by Nicholas Griffith	Member of Parliament for Caernarfon; 1604–1609	Succeeded by Clement Edmondes
