= Richard Bulkeley (died 1573) =

Welsh Member of Parliament for Anglesey

Sir Richard Bulkeley
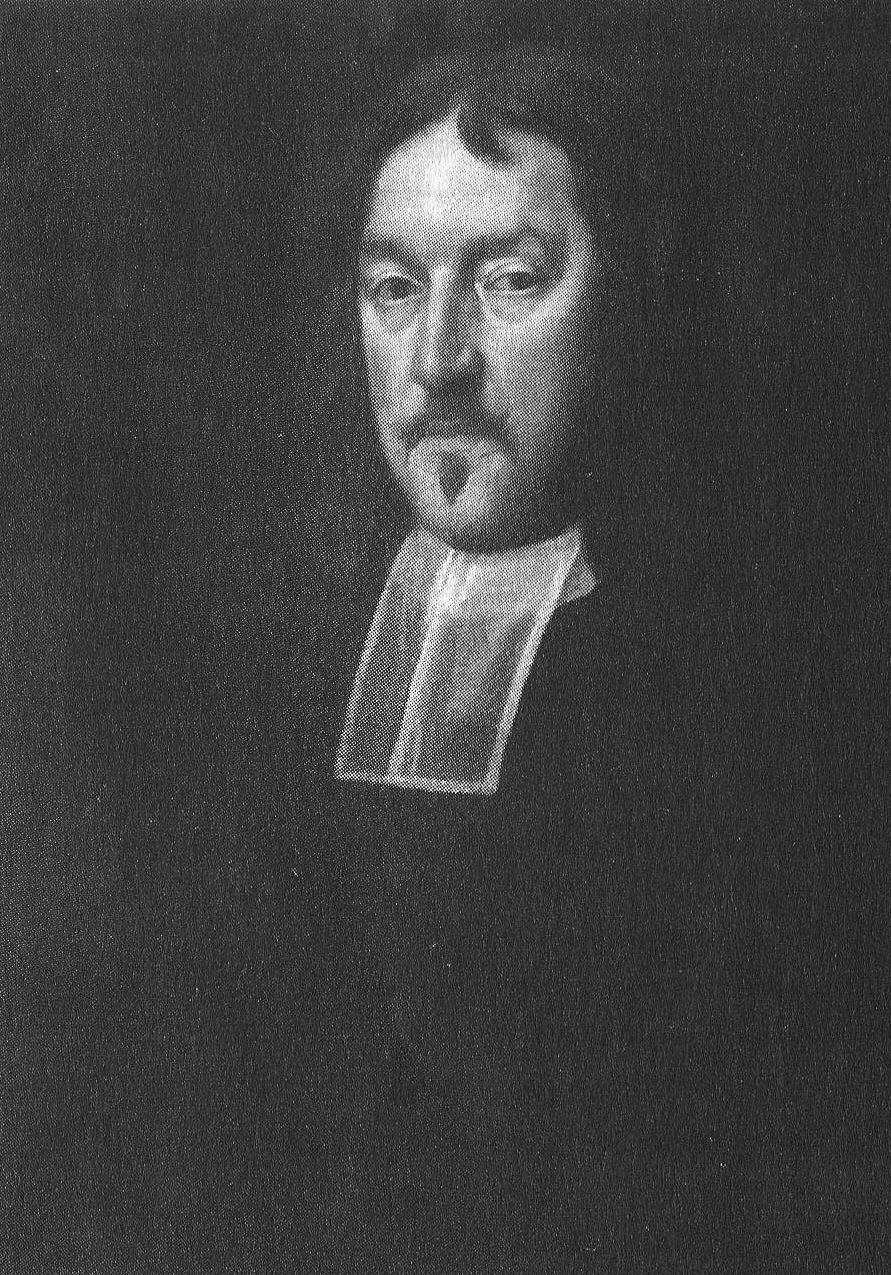

High Sheriff of Anglesey
- In office 1547; 1552; 1561
- Monarchs: Edward VI (1st and 2nd appointment); Elizabeth I (3rd appointment)

High Sheriff of Caernarvonshire
- In office 1550; 1558
- Monarchs: Edward VI (1st appointment); Elizabeth I (2nd appointment)

Member of Parliament for Anglesey
- In office 1549 – 1552; April 1554 – May 1554; Nov 1554 – Jan 1555; 1571 – 1572.
- Monarch: Elizabeth I

Sir Richard Bulkeley (1524 – 1572 or 1573) was a Welsh politician, and High Sheriff of both Anglesey and Caernarvonshire.

== Ancestry ==
He was the eldest son of Sir Richard Bulkeley, of Beaumaris, Chamberlain of North Wales in 1534. His mother Catherine was the daughter of Sir William Griffith, Knight of Penrhyn Castle in the county of Caernarfon and his wife Jane Stradling.

== Life ==
He was knighted at Berwick-upon-Tweed in 1547 by John Dudley, 1st Earl of Warwick and Lieutenant of the King's Army in Scotland. He was appointed High Sheriff of Anglesey in 1547, 1552 and 1561, and High Sheriff of Caernarvonshire in 1550 and 1558. and Custos Rotulorum of Anglesey bef. 1558–1572. As the leading citizen of Beaumaris he did everything possible to advance the town's interests, and obtained a charter for its incorporation from Elizabeth I in 1562. His eldest son became the first Mayor of Beaumaris the following year.

He was the Member of Parliament for Anglesey in 1549–1552, April to May 1554, Nov 1554 to Jan 1555, and in 1571–1572.

He married twice: firstly Margaret, daughter of Sir John Savage of Rock Savage, Cheshire, and Lady Elizabeth Somerset (daughter of Charles Somerset, 1st Earl of Worcester), and secondly Agnes, eldest daughter of Thomas Needham of Shenton. His eldest son Richard was also an MP and his youngest son Lancelot was Archbishop of Dublin from 1619 to 1650. He died in 1573; his second wife, who had been unfaithful to him, was accused by his eldest son of having poisoned him. She was convicted of adultery by an ecclesiastical court but a local jury acquitted her of murder.
