= Ynys Môn (UK Parliament constituency) =

UK Parliament constituency (1536–)

Coordinates: 53.265°N 4.363°W

- County constituency for the House of Commons
- Interactive map of the constituency.
- Location of the constituency within Wales
- Preserved county: Gwynedd
- Electorate: 52,415 (March 2020)
- Major settlements: Holyhead, Llangefni, Beaumaris, Amlwch

Current constituency
- Created: 1536 (as Anglesey)
- Member of Parliament: Llinos Medi (Plaid Cymru)
- Seats: One

Overlaps
- Senedd: Bangor Conwy Môn

Ynys Môn (Welsh pronunciation: [ˌənɨs ˈmoːn]; officially called Anglesey until 1983) is a constituency of the House of Commons of the Parliament of the United Kingdom. It elects one Member of Parliament (MP) by the first past the post system of election. It is one of five "protected constituencies" within the UK, with boundaries defined by the Parliamentary Constituencies Act 2020 to be to those of Isle of Anglesey County Council where there must be a whole number of MPs rounded up to the nearest whole number with these boundaries.

The Ynys Môn Senedd constituency was created with the same boundaries in 1999 (as an Assembly constituency).

As of 2024, Ynys Môn is represented by Llinos Medi of Plaid Cymru.

== Constituency profile ==
The seat covers the isles of Anglesey and Holy Island. Incomes and house prices are slightly below average for the UK. Electoral Calculus describes the seat as "Traditionalist", characterised by socially conservative Labour-inclined voters with lower levels of income and formal education.

== History ==
The Laws in Wales Act 1535 (26 Hen. 8. c. 26) provided for a single county seat in the House of Commons for each of 12 historic Welsh counties (including Anglesey) and two for Monmouthshire. Using the modern year, starting on 1 January, these parliamentary constituencies were authorised in 1536.

The Act contains the following provision, which had the effect of enfranchising the shire of Anglesey:

And that for this present Parliament, and all other Parliaments to be holden and kept for this Realm, one Knight shall be chosen and elected to the same Parliaments for every of the Shires of Brecknock, Radnor, Mountgomery and Denbigh, and for every other Shire within the said Country of Dominion of Wales;

The earliest known results are a fragment of the 1541 returns, in which the name of the Knight of the Shire for Anglesey (as Members of Parliament from county constituencies were known before the 19th century) has been lost. It is not known if Anglesey was represented in the parliaments of 1536 and 1539.

The borough constituency of Newborough, soon renamed Beaumaris, returned a member of parliament for the boroughs of Anglesey. It was abolished in 1885, leaving only the county constituency of Anglesey. The official name of the constituency in English was Anglesey, until it was replaced by the Welsh name Ynys Môn. Parliament approved the change, to take effect from the 1983 general election. This was purely an alteration of the official name, as no boundary changes were involved.

== Boundaries ==
Geographically, the constituency of Ynys Môn comprises the whole of the main island of Anglesey and the smaller Holy Island.

The Parliamentary Constituencies Act 2020 amends Schedule 2 to the Parliamentary Constituencies Act 1986 in granting Ynys Môn "protected" status, meaning the island must have a whole number of constituencies exclusively within the boundaries of the island.

== Members of Parliament ==
=== MPs 1545–1640 ===
Parliament	Member
1545	William Bulkeley
1547	William Bulkeley
1549	Sir Richard Bulkeley (I)
1553 (Mar)	Lewis Ab Owen ap Meurig
1553 (Oct)	William Lewis
1554 (Apr)	Sir Richard Bulkeley (I)
1554 (Nov)	Sir Richard Bulkeley (I)
1555	William Lewis
1558	Rowland Ap Meredydd
1562–3	Richard Bulkeley (II)
1571	Sir Richard Bulkeley (I)
1572	Lewis Ab Owen ap Meurig
1584	Owen Holland
1586	Sir Henry Bagenal
1588	Richard Bulkeley (III)
1593	William Glynne
1597	Hugh Hughes
1601	Thomas Holland
1604	Sir Richard Bulkeley (II)
1614	Sir Richard Bulkeley (II)
1621	Richard Williams
1624	John Mostyn
1625	Sir Sackville Trevor
1626	Richard Bulkeley (IV)
1628	Richard Bulkeley (IV)
1639–1640	No Parliaments summoned

=== MPs after 1640 ===
Short Parliament

- April 1640: John Bodvel

Long Parliament

- 1640–1644: John Bodvel (Royalist) – disabled to sit, 5 February 1644
- 1646–1648: Richard Wood – excluded in Pride's Purge, December 1648

Anglesey was unrepresented in Barebone's Parliament

First Protectorate Parliament

- 1654–1655: Col. George Twisleton
- 1654–1655: William Foxwist

Second Protectorate Parliament

- 1656–1658: Col. George Twisleton
- 1656–1658: Griffith Bodwrda

Third Protectorate Parliament

- 1659: Col. George Twisleton

Election	Member	Party
April 1660	The Viscount Bulkeley	Court
1661	Nicholas Bagenal	Court
February 1679	Hon. Henry Bulkeley	Tory
August 1679	Hon. Richard Bulkeley	Tory
1685	The Viscount Bulkeley	Tory
1689	Hon. Thomas Bulkeley	Tory
1690	The Viscount Bulkeley	Tory
1704	The Viscount Bulkeley	Tory
1715	Owen Meyrick	Whig
1722	The Viscount Bulkeley	Tory
1725	Hugh Williams	Whig
1734	Sir Nicholas Bayly, Bt	Opposition Whig
1741	John Owen	Opposition Whig
1747	Sir Nicholas Bayly, Bt	Opposition Whig
1761	Owen Meyrick	Whig
1770	Sir Nicholas Bayly, Bt	Opposition Whig
1774	The Viscount Bulkeley	Opposition, later allied to Burke and later still to Pitt
1784	Nicholas Bayly	Independent Whig, supported Pitt
1790	Hon. William Paget	Whig, supported Pitt
1794	Hon. Sir Arthur Paget	Whig
1807	Hon. Berkeley Paget	Whig
1820	The Earl of Uxbridge	Whig
1832	Sir Richard Williams-Bulkeley, Bt	Whig
1837	Hon. William Stanley	Whig
1847	Sir Richard Williams-Bulkeley, Bt	Whig
1859	Sir Richard Williams-Bulkeley, Bt	Liberal
1868	Richard Davies	Liberal
1886	Thomas Lewis	Liberal (Gladstonian)
1895	Ellis Ellis-Griffith	Liberal
1916	Ellis Ellis-Griffith	Coalition Liberal
1918	Sir Owen Thomas	Independent Labour
1923 by-election	Sir Robert Thomas, Bt	Liberal
1929	Lady Megan Lloyd George	Liberal
1931	Lady Megan Lloyd George	Independent Liberal
1935	Lady Megan Lloyd George	Liberal
1951	Cledwyn Hughes	Labour
1979	Keith Best	Conservative
1983	Name changed to Ynys Môn	
1987	Ieuan Wyn Jones	Plaid Cymru
2001	Albert Owen	Labour
2019	Virginia Crosbie	Conservative
2024	Llinos Medi	Plaid Cymru

== Election results ==
=== Election graph ===
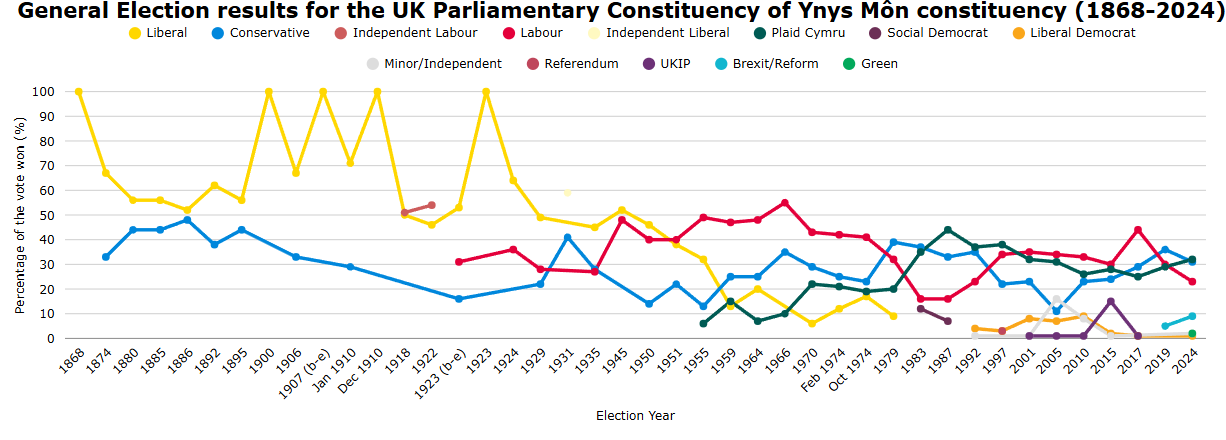
Graph to show the election results of the Ynys Môn UK constituency. (1868-2024)

=== Elections in the 1830s ===
1830 general election: Anglesey
Party	Candidate	Votes	%	±%
Whig	Henry Paget	Unopposed		
Registered electors		c. 600		
Whig hold				

1831 general election: Anglesey
Party	Candidate	Votes	%	±%
Whig	Henry Paget	Unopposed		
Registered electors		c. 600		
Whig hold				

1832 general election: Anglesey
Party	Candidate	Votes	%	±%
Whig	Richard Williams-Bulkeley	Unopposed		
Registered electors		1,187		
Whig hold				

1835 general election: Anglesey
Party	Candidate	Votes	%	±%
Whig	Richard Williams-Bulkeley	Unopposed		
Registered electors		1,155		
Whig hold				

1837 Anglesey by-election
Party	Candidate	Votes	%	±%
Whig	William Owen Stanley	693	54.2	N/A
Conservative	Owen John Augustus Fuller Meyrick	586	45.8	N/A
Majority		107	8.4	N/A
Turnout		1,279	88.2	N/A
Registered electors		1,450		
Whig hold				

- Caused by Williams-Bulkeley's resignation

1837 general election: Anglesey
Party	Candidate	Votes	%	±%
Whig	William Owen Stanley	Unopposed		
Registered electors		1,450		
Whig hold				

=== Elections in the 1840s ===
1841 general election: Anglesey
Party	Candidate	Votes	%	±%
Whig	William Owen Stanley	Unopposed		
Registered electors		2,434		
Whig hold				

1847 general election: Anglesey
Party	Candidate	Votes	%	±%
Whig	Richard Williams-Bulkeley	Unopposed		
Registered electors		2,465		
Whig hold				

=== Elections in the 1850s ===
1852 general election: Anglesey
Party	Candidate	Votes	%	±%
Whig	Richard Williams-Bulkeley	Unopposed		
Registered electors		2,577		
Whig hold				

1857 general election: Anglesey
Party	Candidate	Votes	%	±%
Whig	Richard Williams-Bulkeley	Unopposed		
Registered electors		2,310		
Whig hold				

1859 general election: Anglesey
Party	Candidate	Votes	%	±%
Liberal	Richard Williams-Bulkeley	Unopposed		
Registered electors		2,258		
Liberal hold				

=== Elections in the 1860s ===
1865 general election: Anglesey
Party	Candidate	Votes	%	±%
Liberal	Richard Williams-Bulkeley	Unopposed		
Registered electors		2,352		
Liberal hold				

1868 general election: Anglesey
Party	Candidate	Votes	%	±%
Liberal	Richard Davies	Unopposed		
Registered electors		3,496		
Liberal hold				

=== Elections in the 1870s ===
1874 general election: Anglesey
Party	Candidate	Votes	%	±%
Liberal	Richard Davies	1,636	67.4	N/A
Conservative	Richard Williams-Bulkeley	793	32.6	N/A
Majority		843	34.8	N/A
Turnout		2,429	76.6	N/A
Registered electors		3,173		
Liberal hold		Swing	N/A	

=== Elections in the 1880s ===
1880 general election: Anglesey
Party	Candidate	Votes	%	±%
Liberal	Richard Davies	1,394	56.2	―11.2
Conservative	George Pritchard Rayner	1,085	43.8	+11.2
Majority		309	12.4	―22.4
Turnout		2,479	78.2	+1.6
Registered electors		3,171		
Liberal hold		Swing	―11.2	

1885 general election: Anglesey
Party	Candidate	Votes	%	±%
Liberal	Richard Davies	4,412	56.0	―0.2
Conservative	George Pritchard Rayner	3,462	44.0	+0.2
Majority		950	12.0	―0.4
Turnout		7,874	80.5	+2.3
Registered electors		9,777		
Liberal hold		Swing	―0.2	

1886 general election: Anglesey
Party	Candidate	Votes	%	±%
Liberal	Thomas Lewis	3,727	52.1	―3.9
Conservative	George Pritchard Rayner	3,420	47.9	+3.9
Majority		307	4.2	―7.8
Turnout		7,147	73.1	―7.4
Registered electors		9,777		
Liberal hold		Swing	―3.9	

=== Elections in the 1890s ===
1892 general election: Anglesey
Party	Candidate	Votes	%	±%
Liberal	Thomas Lewis	4,420	62.1	+10.0
Liberal Unionist	Morgan Lloyd	2,702	37.9	―10.0
Majority		1,718	24.2	+20.0
Turnout		7,122	70.6	―2.5
Registered electors		10,093		
Liberal hold		Swing	+10.0	

Ellis Griffith

1895 general election: Anglesey
Party	Candidate	Votes	%	±%
Liberal	Ellis Griffith	4,224	56.9	―5.2
Conservative	J R Roberts	3,197	43.1	+5.2
Majority		1,027	13.8	―10.4
Turnout		7,421	74.3	+3.7
Registered electors		9,993		
Liberal hold		Swing	―5.2	

=== Elections in the 1900s ===
1900 general election: Anglesey
Party	Candidate	Votes	%	±%
Liberal	Ellis Griffith	Unopposed		
Registered electors				
Liberal hold				

Ellis Griffith

1906 general election: Anglesey
Party	Candidate	Votes	%	±%
Liberal	Ellis Griffith	5,356	67.0	N/A
Conservative	C F Priestley	2,638	33.0	N/A
Majority		2,718	34.0	N/A
Turnout		7,994	79.9	N/A
Registered electors		10,001		
Liberal hold		Swing	N/A	

1907 Anglesey by-election
Party	Candidate	Votes	%	±%
Liberal	Ellis Griffith	Unopposed		
Registered electors				
Liberal hold				

=== Elections in the 1910s ===
January 1910 general election: Anglesey
Party	Candidate	Votes	%	±%
Liberal	Ellis Griffith	5,888	70.7	+3.7
Conservative	Richard Owen Roberts	2,436	29.3	―3.7
Majority		3,452	41.4	+7.4
Turnout		8,324	80.5	+0.6
Registered electors		10,341		
Liberal hold		Swing	+3.7	

December 1910 general election: Anglesey
Party	Candidate	Votes	%	±%
Liberal	Ellis Griffith	Unopposed		
Registered electors		10,341		
Liberal hold				

Owen Thomas

1918 general election: Anglesey
Party		Candidate	Votes	%	±%
	Independent Labour	Owen Thomas	9,038	50.4	N/A
C	National Liberal	Ellis Griffith	8,898	49.6	N/A
Majority			140	0.8	N/A
Turnout			17,936	69.4	N/A
Registered electors			25,836		
	Independent Labour gain from National Liberal		Swing		
C indicates candidate endorsed by the coalition government.

=== Elections in the 1920s ===
1922 general election: Anglesey
Party	Candidate	Votes	%	±%
Independent Labour	Owen Thomas	11,929	54.2	+3.8
National Liberal	Robert Thomas	10,067	45.8	―3.8
Majority		1,862	8.4	+7.6
Turnout		21,996	80.5	+11.1
Registered electors		27,320		
Independent Labour hold		Swing	+3.8	

1923 Anglesey by-election
Party	Candidate	Votes	%	±%
Liberal	Robert Thomas	11,116	53.3	+7.5
Labour	Edward John	6,368	30.5	―23.7
Unionist	Richard Owen Roberts	3,385	16.2	N/A
Majority		4,748	22.8	N/A
Turnout		20,869	76.4	―4.1
Registered electors		27,320		
Liberal gain from Independent Labour		Swing	+15.6	

1923 general election: Anglesey
Party	Candidate	Votes	%	±%
Liberal	Robert Thomas	Unopposed		
Registered electors		28,135		
Liberal hold				

Sir Robert Thomas

1924 general election: Anglesey
Party	Candidate	Votes	%	±%
Liberal	Robert Thomas	13,407	63.9	N/A
Labour	Cyril O. Jones	7,580	36.1	N/A
Majority		5,827	27.8	N/A
Turnout		20,987	74.0	N/A
Registered electors		28,343		
Liberal hold		Swing	N/A	

1929 general election: Anglesey
Party	Candidate	Votes	%	±%
Liberal	Megan Lloyd George	13,181	49.4	―14.5
Labour	William Edwards	7,563	28.4	―7.7
Unionist	Albert Hughes	5,917	22.2	N/A
Majority		5,618	21.0	―6.8
Turnout		26,661	79.8	+5.8
Registered electors		33,392		
Liberal hold		Swing	―3.4	

=== Elections in the 1930s ===
1931 general election: Anglesey
Party	Candidate	Votes	%	±%
Independent Liberals	Megan Lloyd George	14,839	58.3	+8.9
Conservative	Albert Hughes	10,612	41.7	+19.5
Majority		4,227	16.6	―4.4
Turnout		25,451	75.5	―4.3
Registered electors		33,700		
Independent Liberals gain from Liberal				

1935 general election: Anglesey
Party	Candidate	Votes	%	±%
Liberal	Megan Lloyd George	11,227	44.5	―13.8
Conservative	Francis John Watkin Williams	7,045	27.9	―13.8
Labour	Henry Jones	6,959	27.6	N/A
Majority		4,182	16.6	±0.0
Turnout		25,231	74.4	―1.1
Registered electors		33,930		
Liberal gain from Independent Liberals				

=== Elections in the 1940s ===
1945 general election: Anglesey
Party	Candidate	Votes	%	±%
Liberal	Megan Lloyd George	12,610	52.2	+7.7
Labour	Cledwyn Hughes	11,529	47.8	+20.2
Majority		1,081	4.4	―12.2
Turnout		24,139	70.6	―3.8
Registered electors		34,210		
Liberal hold		Swing		

=== Elections in the 1950s ===
1950 general election: Anglesey
Party	Candidate	Votes	%	±%
Liberal	Megan Lloyd George	13,688	46.7	―5.5
Labour	Cledwyn Hughes	11,759	40.0	―7.8
Conservative	J O Jones	3,919	13.3	N/A
Majority		1,929	6.7	+2.3
Turnout		29,366	82.7	+12.1
Registered electors		35,490		
Liberal hold		Swing	+1.6	

1951 general election: Anglesey
Party	Candidate	Votes	%	±%
Labour	Cledwyn Hughes	11,814	40.1	+0.1
Liberal	Megan Lloyd George	11,219	38.2	―8.5
Conservative	O Meurig Roberts	6,366	21.7	+8.4
Majority		595	1.9	N/A
Turnout		29,399	81.4	―1.3
Registered electors		36,117		
Labour gain from Liberal		Swing	+4.3	

1955 general election: Anglesey
Party	Candidate	Votes	%	±%
Labour	Cledwyn Hughes	13,986	48.4	+8.3
Liberal	John Williams Hughes	9,413	32.6	―5.6
Conservative	Owen H. Hughes	3,333	13.3	―8.4
Plaid Cymru	J Rowland Jones	2,183	7.5	N/A
Majority		4,573	15.8	+13.9
Turnout		28,915	80.4	―1.0
Registered electors		35,980		
Labour hold		Swing	+6.9	

1959 general election: Anglesey
Party	Candidate	Votes	%	±%
Labour	Cledwyn Hughes	13,249	47.0	―1.4
Conservative	O Meurig Hughes	7,005	24.9	+11.6
Plaid Cymru	Robert Tudur Jones	4,121	14.6	+7.1
Liberal	Rhys Lloyd	3,796	13.5	―19.1
Majority		6,244	22.1	+6.3
Turnout		28,171	77.6	―2.8
Registered electors		36,281		
Labour hold		Swing	–6.5	

=== Elections in the 1960s ===
1964 general election: Anglesey
Party	Candidate	Votes	%	±%
Labour	Cledwyn Hughes	13,553	48.1	+1.1
Conservative	John Eilian Jones	7,016	25.0	+0.1
Liberal	E Gwyn Jones	5,730	20.4	+6.9
Plaid Cymru	R. Tudur Jones	1,817	6.5	―8.1
Majority		6,537	23.1	+1.0
Turnout		28,116	78.6	+1.0
Registered electors		35,793		
Labour hold		Swing	+0.5	

1966 general election: Anglesey
Party	Candidate	Votes	%	±%
Labour	Cledwyn Hughes	14,874	55.0	+6.9
Conservative	John Eilian Jones	9,576	35.4	+10.4
Plaid Cymru	John Wynn Meredith	2,596	9.6	+3.1
Majority		5,298	19.6	―3.5
Turnout		27,046	73.2	―5.4
Registered electors		36,950		
Labour hold		Swing	―1.7	

=== Elections in the 1970s ===
1970 general election: Anglesey
Party	Candidate	Votes	%	±%
Labour	Cledwyn Hughes	13,966	43.2	―11.8
Conservative	John Eilian Jones	9,220	28.5	―6.9
Plaid Cymru	John Lasarus Williams	7,140	22.1	+12.5
Liberal	Winston Roddick	2,013	6.2	N/A
Majority		4,746	14.7	―4.9
Turnout		32,339	78.2	+5.0
Registered electors		41,319		
Labour hold		Swing	―2.4	

February 1974 general election: Anglesey
Party	Candidate	Votes	%	±%
Labour	Cledwyn Hughes	14,652	41.8	―1.4
Conservative	Thomas Vivan Lewis	8,898	25.4	―3.1
Plaid Cymru	Dafydd Iwan	7,610	21.7	―0.4
Liberal	Edwin Jones	3,882	11.1	+4.9
Majority		5,754	16.4	+1.7
Turnout		35,042	80.2	+2.0
Registered electors		43,685		
Labour hold		Swing	+0.8	

October 1974 general election: Anglesey
Party	Candidate	Votes	%	±%
Labour	Cledwyn Hughes	13,947	41.6	―0.2
Conservative	Vivan Lewis	7,975	23.8	―1.6
Plaid Cymru	Dafydd Iwan	6,410	19.1	―2.6
Liberal	Mervyn Ankers	5,182	15.5	+4.4
Majority		5,972	17.8	+1.4
Turnout		33,514	76.1	―4.1
Registered electors		44,026		
Labour hold		Swing	+0.7	

1979 general election: Anglesey
Party	Candidate	Votes	%	±%
Conservative	Keith Best	15,100	39.0	+15.2
Labour	Elystan Morgan	12,283	31.7	―9.9
Plaid Cymru	John Lasarus Williams	7,863	20.3	+1.2
Liberal	John Gwynedd Jones	3,500	9.0	―6.5
Majority		2,817	7.3	N/A
Turnout		38,746	81.2	+5.1
Registered electors		47,726		
Conservative gain from Labour		Swing	+12.5	

=== Elections in the 1980s ===
1983 general election: Ynys Môn
Party	Candidate	Votes	%	±%
Conservative	Keith Best	15,017	37.5	―1.5
Plaid Cymru	Ieuan Wyn Jones	13,333	33.3	+13.0
Labour	Tudor Williams	6,791	16.9	―14.8
SDP	David Thomas	4,947	12.3	+3.3
Majority		1,684	4.2	―3.1
Turnout		40,088	79.6	―1.6
Registered electors		50,359		
Conservative hold		Swing		

1987 general election: Ynys Môn
Party	Candidate	Votes	%	±%
Plaid Cymru	Ieuan Wyn Jones	18,580	43.2	+9.9
Conservative	Roger Evans	14,282	33.2	―4.3
Labour	Colin Parry	7,252	16.9	±0.0
SDP	Ieuan Wilson Evans	2,863	6.7	―5.6
Majority		4,298	10.0	N/A
Turnout		42,977	81.7	+2.1
Registered electors		52,633		
Plaid Cymru gain from Conservative		Swing	+7.2	

=== Elections in the 1990s ===
1992 general election: Ynys Môn
Party	Candidate	Votes	%	±%
Plaid Cymru	Ieuan Wyn Jones	15,984	37.1	―6.1
Conservative	Gwynn Rowlands	14,878	34.6	+1.4
Labour	Robin Jones	10,126	23.5	+6.6
Liberal Democrats	Pauline Badger	1,891	4.4	―2.3
Natural Law	Susan Parry	182	0.4	N/A
Majority		1,106	2.5	―7.5
Turnout		43,061	80.6	―1.1
Registered electors		53,412		
Plaid Cymru hold		Swing	―3.7	

1997 general election: Ynys Môn
Party	Candidate	Votes	%	±%
Plaid Cymru	Ieuan Wyn Jones	15,756	39.5	+2.4
Labour	Owen Edwards	13,275	33.2	+9.7
Conservative	Gwilym Owen	8,569	21.5	―13.1
Liberal Democrats	Deric Burnham	1,537	3.8	―0.6
Referendum	Hugh Gray-Morris	793	2.0	N/A
Majority		2,481	6.3	+3.8
Turnout		39,930	75.4	―5.2
Registered electors		53,294		
Plaid Cymru hold		Swing	+3.7	

=== Elections in the 2000s ===
2001 general election: Ynys Môn
Party	Candidate	Votes	%	±%
Labour	Albert Owen	11,906	35.0	+1.8
Plaid Cymru	Eilian Williams	11,106	32.6	―6.9
Conservative	Albie Fox	7,653	22.5	+1.0
Liberal Democrats	Nicholas Bennett	2,772	8.1	+4.3
UKIP	Francis Wykes	359	1.1	N/A
Independent	Nona Donald	222	0.7	N/A
Majority		800	2.4	N/A
Turnout		34,018	63.7	―11.7
Registered electors		53,398		
Labour gain from Plaid Cymru		Swing	+4.3	

2005 general election: Ynys Môn
Party	Candidate	Votes	%	±%
Labour	Albert Owen	12,278	34.6	―0.4
Plaid Cymru	Eurig Wyn	11,036	31.1	―1.5
Independent	Peter Rogers	5,216	14.7	N/A
Conservative	James Roach	3,915	11.0	―11.5
Liberal Democrats	Sarah Green	2,418	6.8	―1.3
UKIP	Elaine Gill	367	1.0	―0.1
Legalise Cannabis	Tim Evans	232	0.7	N/A
Majority		1,242	3.5	+1.1
Turnout		35,462	67.5	+3.8
Registered electors		52,512		
Labour hold		Swing	+0.6	

=== Elections in the 2010s ===
2010 general election: Ynys Môn
Party	Candidate	Votes	%	±%
Labour	Albert Owen	11,490	33.4	―1.2
Plaid Cymru	Dylan Rees	9,029	26.2	―4.9
Conservative	Anthony Ridge-Newman	7,744	22.5	+11.5
Liberal Democrats	Matt Wood	2,592	7.5	+0.7
Independent	Peter Rogers	2,225	6.5	―8.2
UKIP	Elaine Gill	1,201	3.5	+2.5
Christian	David Owen	163	0.5	N/A
Majority		2,461	7.2	+3.7
Turnout		34,444	68.8	+1.3
Registered electors		50,075		
Labour hold		Swing	+1.8	

2015 general election: Ynys Môn
Party	Candidate	Votes	%	±%
Labour	Albert Owen	10,871	31.1	―2.3
Plaid Cymru	John Rowlands	10,642	30.5	+4.3
Conservative	Michelle Willis	7,393	21.2	―1.3
UKIP	Nathan Gill	5,121	14.7	+11.2
Liberal Democrats	Mark Rosenthal	751	2.2	―5.3
Socialist Labour	Liz Screen	148	0.4	N/A
Rejected ballots		67		
Majority		229	0.6	―6.6
Turnout		34,926	69.9	+1.1
Registered electors		49,939		
Labour hold		Swing	―3.2	

Of the 67 rejected ballots:

- 51 were either unmarked or it was uncertain who the vote was for.
- 16 voted for more than one candidate.

2017 general election: Ynys Môn
Party	Candidate	Votes	%	±%
Labour	Albert Owen	15,643	41.9	+10.8
Conservative	Tomos Davies	10,384	27.8	+6.6
Plaid Cymru	Ieuan Wyn Jones	10,237	27.4	―3.1
UKIP	James Turner	624	1.7	―13.0
Liberal Democrats	Sarah Jackson	479	1.3	―0.9
Majority		5,259	14.1	+13.5
Turnout		37,367	70.6	+0.7
Registered electors		52,921		
Labour hold		Swing	+2.1	

2019 general election: Ynys Môn
Party	Candidate	Votes	%	±%
Conservative	Virginia Crosbie	12,959	35.5	+7.7
Labour	Mary Roberts	10,991	30.1	―11.8
Plaid Cymru	Aled ap Dafydd	10,418	28.5	+1.1
Brexit Party	Helen Jenner	2,184	6.0	N/A
Rejected ballots		121		
Majority		1,968	5.4	N/A
Turnout		36,552	70.4	―0.2
Registered electors		51,925		
Conservative gain from Labour		Swing	+9.8	

Of the 121 rejected ballots:

- 96 were either unmarked or it was uncertain who the vote was for.
- 24 voted for more than one candidate.
- 1 had want of official mark.

=== Elections in the 2020s ===
2024 general election: Ynys Môn
Party	Candidate	Votes	%	±%
Plaid Cymru	Llinos Medi	10,590	32.5	▲4.0
Conservative	Virginia Crosbie	9,953	30.5	▼5.0
Labour	Ieuan Môn Williams	7,619	23.4	▼6.7
Reform	Emmett Jenner	3,223	9.9	▲3.9
Green	Martin Schwaller	604	1.9	new
Liberal Democrats	Leena Farhat	439	1.4	new
Monster Raving Loony	Sir Grumpus L Shorticus	156	0.5	new
Libertarian	Sam Andrew Wood	44	0.1	new
Majority		637	2.0	N/A
Turnout		32,628	61.4	▼8.3
Registered electors		53,141		
Plaid Cymru gain from Conservative		Swing	▲4.5	

== See also ==
- Ynys Môn (Senedd constituency)
- List of parliamentary constituencies in Gwynedd
- List of parliamentary constituencies in Wales
