= List of English by-elections (1701–1707) =

This is a list of parliamentary by-elections in England held between 1701 and 1707, with the names of the previous incumbent and the victor in the by-election.

In the absence of a comprehensive and reliable source, for party and factional alignments in this period, no attempt is made to define them in this article. The House of Commons: 1690-1715 provides some guidance to the complex and shifting political relationships, but it is significant that the compilers of that work make no attempt to produce a definitive list of each members allegiances.

== Dates ==
During this period England counted its legal year as beginning on 25 March. For the purposes of this list the year is considered to have started on 1 January.

== By-elections ==
The c/u column denotes whether the by-election was a contested poll or an unopposed return. If the winner was re-elected, at the next general election and any intermediate by-elections, this is indicated by an * following the c or u. In a few cases the winner was elected at the next general election but had not been re-elected in a by-election after the one noted. In those cases no * symbol is used.

=== 5th Parliament of William III (1701) ===
Date	Constituency	c/u	Former Incumbent	Winner	Cause
19 February 1701	Amersham	u*	Sir John Garrard	John Drake	Death
21 February 1701	Hertford	c*	Thomas Filmer	Richard Goulston	Death
21 February 1701	Northampton	c*	William Thursby	Thomas Andrew	Death
25 February 1701	Droitwich	u	Thomas Foley	Philip Foley	Death
3 March 1701	Newport (I.o.W.)	u	The Lord Cutts	Henry Greenhill	Chose to sit for Cambridgeshire
4 March 1701	Steyning	c	Sir John Fagg	Sir Robert Fagg	Death
4 March 1701	Truro	u	Hugh Fortescue	Sir John Hawles	Chose to sit for Tregony
5 March 1701	Wareham	u	Thomas Erle	Sir Edward Ernle	Chose to sit for Portsmouth
7 March 1701	Bere Alston	u*	Sir Rowland Gwynne	William Cowper	Chose to sit for Breconshire
10 March 1701	Amersham	u	The Viscount Newhaven	Sir Samuel Garrard	Chose to sit for Buckinghamshire
17 March 1701	Taunton	c*	Henry Seymour Portman	Sir Francis Warre	Chose to sit for Wells
18 March 1701	Bramber	u*	Thomas Stringer	Francis Seymour Conway	Chose to sit for Clitheroe
19 March 1701	St Albans	c*	Joshua Lomax	John Gape	Void Election
19 March 1701	Thetford	u*	Joseph Williamson	Thomas Hanmer	Chose to sit for Rochester
20 March 1701	City of London	c	Gilbert Heathcote	Sir John Fleet	Expulsion
21 March 1701	Bossiney	u	Francis Robartes	Thomas Watson Wentworth	Chose to sit for Tregony
21 March 1701	Oxford University	c*	Sir Christopher Musgrave	William Bromley	Chose to sit for Westmorland
22 March 1701	Saltash	u*	Alexander Pendarves	Thomas Carew	Chose to sit for Penryn
2 April 1701	St Germans	u	John Speccot	Daniel Eliot	Chose to sit for Cornwall
7 April 1701	Sandwich	c	Sir Henry Furnese	John Michel	Expulsion
16 April 1701	Steyning	c*	Sir Robert Fagg	Charles Goring	By-election voided 10 April 1701
18 April 1701	Lostwithiel	c*	John Buller	George Booth	Death
29 April 1701	Merionethshire	u*	Hugh Nanney	Richard Vaughan	Death
30 April 1701	Castle Rising	u	Thomas Howard	Robert Cecil	Death
31 May 1701	Morpeth	u	William Howard	Sir Richard Sandford	Chose to sit for Northumberland
25 June 1701	Cornwall	u	Hugh Boscawen	Richard Edgcumbe	Death
9 July 1701	Salisbury	u*	Thomas Mompesson	Charles Fox	Death

=== 6th Parliament of William III (1701–1702) ===
Date	Constituency	c/u	Former Incumbent	Winner	Cause
27 January 1702	Exeter	u*	Sir Bartholomew Shower	John Snell	Death
27 January 1702	Portsmouth	u	Thomas Erle	John Gibson	Chose to sit for Wareham
27 January 1702	Seaford	u	Sir William Thomas	Thomas Chowne	Chose to sit for Sussex
2 February 1702	Castle Rising	u	The Earl of Ranelagh	Marquess of Hartington	Chose to sit for West Looe
2 February 1702	Flint Boroughs	u	Sir Thomas Hanmer	Sir John Conway	Chose to sit for Thetford
3 February 1702	Northallerton	u	Robert Dormer	Daniel Lascelles	Chose to sit for Buckinghamshire
4 February 1702	Dorchester	u*	Thomas Trenchard	Sir Nathaniel Napier	Chose to sit for Dorset
4 February 1702	East Looe	u	Francis Godolphin	George Courtenay	Chose to sit for Helston
4 February 1702	Plymouth	u*	Henry Trelawny	John Woolcombe	Death
5 February 1702	Milborne Port	c*	Henry Thynne	John Hunt	Chose to sit for Tamworth
5 February 1702	Saltash	u*	James Buller	Benjamin Buller	Chose to sit for Cornwall
5 February 1702	Weymouth and Melcombe Regis	c*	Maurice Ashley	Anthony Henley	Chose to sit for Wiltshire
9 February 1702	Berwick-upon-Tweed	u*	Francis Blake	Jonathan Hutchinson	Chose to sit for Northumberland
12 February 1702	Truro	u	William Scawen	Robert Cotton	Chose to sit for Grampound
19 February 1702	Cockermouth	c*	Goodwin Wharton	Thomas Lamplugh	Chose to sit for Buckinghamshire
7 March 1702	Newport (I.o.W.)	u	The Lord Cutts	James Stanhope	Chose to sit for Cambridgeshire
23 March 1702	Calne	u*	Sir Charles Hedges	Henry Chivers	Election voided due to a Double Return
23 March 1702	Calne	u*	Edward Bayntun	Henry Chivers	Election voided due to a Double Return
13 April 1702	Higham Ferrers	u*	Thomas Ekins	Thomas Pemberton	Death

=== 1st Parliament of Queen Anne (1702–1705) ===
Date	Constituency	c/u	Former Incumbent	Winner	Cause
14 November 1702	Devizes	u	Sir Francis Child	John Child	Chose to sit for City of London
21 November 1702	Malmesbury	u	Sir Charles Hedges	Thomas Boucher	Chose to sit for Calne
23 November 1702	Hedon	u*	Sir Charles Duncombe	Anthony Duncombe	Chose to sit for Downton
23 November 1702	Northallerton	u*	Sir William Hustler	Robert Dormer	Chose to sit for Ripon
24 November 1702	Lewes	u	Thomas Pelham	Sir Nicholas Pelham	Chose to sit for Sussex
24 November 1702	Wareham	u	George Pitt	Sir Josiah Child	Chose to sit for Hampshire
25 November 1702	Marlborough	c	John Jeffreys	Edward Jeffreys	Chose to sit for Breconshire
25 November 1702	Southwark	c*	Charles Cox	Charles Cox	Void Election
25 November 1702	Southwark	c*	John Cholmley	John Cholmley	Void Election
26 November 1702	Truro	u	Thomas Powys	Philip Meadowes	Chose to sit for Ludlow
27 November 1702	Totnes	u	Sir Christopher Musgrave	William Seymour	Chose to sit for Westmorland
28 November 1702	Tiverton	u*	Lord Spencer	Robert Burridge	Succeeded to a peerage
1 December 1702	Bletchingley	c	John Evelyn	Sir Robert Clayton	Death
2 December 1702	Bodmin	u*	John Grubham Howe	Russell Robartes	Chose to sit for Gloucestershire
2 December 1702	Flint Boroughs	u	Sir Roger Mostyn	Thomas Mostyn	Chose to sit for Cheshire
3 December 1702	West Looe	u	Sidney Godolphin	Richard Hele	Chose to sit for Helston
14 December 1702	Colchester	u*	Isaac Rebow	Isaac Rebow	Void Election
14 December 1702	Tamworth	c*	Henry Thynne	Joseph Girdler	Chose to sit for Weymouth
21 December 1702	Aylesbury	c	Sir John Pakington	Simon Harcourt	Chose to sit for Worcestershire
26 December 1702	Stafford	u*	John Chetwynd	Walter Chetwynd	Death
29 December 1702	Gloucester	c*	John Grubham Howe	John Hanbury	Chose to sit for Gloucestershire
31 December 1702	Newton	u	John Grubham Howe	Thomas Legh	Chose to sit for Gloucestershire
31 December 1702	Portsmouth	u*	Thomas Erle	William Gifford	Chose to sit for Wareham
11 January 1703	Lancashire	u	James Stanley	Richard Assheton	Succeeded to a peerage
25 January 1703	Saltash	u	Benjamin Buller	John Rolle	Death
8 February 1703	Sudbury	c	Joseph Haskin Stiles	Joseph Haskin Stiles	Void Election
8 February 1703	Sudbury	c	Joseph Haskin Stiles	George Dashwood	By-election results reversed on petition 6 December 1703
10 February 1703	Lincolnshire	u	Charles Dymoke	Lewis Dymoke	Death
3 March 1703	Devizes	u	John Child	Francis Merewether	Death
31 March 1703	West Looe	u	Richard Hele	Henry Poley	Chose to sit for Plympton Erle
31 March 1703	West Looe	u	The Earl of Ranelagh	Charles Seymour	Expelled
22 November 1703	Bury St Edmunds	c*	John Hervey	Sir Robert Davers	Elevated to the peerage
22 November 1703	Higham Ferrers	u*	Thomas Pemberton	Thomas Watson Wentworth	Death
22 November 1703	Oxford University	c*	Heneage Finch	Sir William Whitelock	Elevated to the peerage
24 November 1703	Newcastle-under-Lyme	c*	John Leveson Gower	John Offley Crewe	Elevated to the peerage
26 November 1703	Bramber	c	Francis Seymour Conway	John Middleton	Elevated to the peerage
26 November 1703	Tavistock	c*	Lord Robert Russell	James Bulteel	Death
29 November 1703	Beaumaris	u	Robert Bulkeley	Coningsby Williams	Death
30 November 1703	Callington	u*	John Acland	Sir William Coryton	Death
7 December 1703	Newton	u*	Thomas Legh	John Ward	Death
8 December 1703	Cornwall	u*	John Granville	Sir Richard Vyvyan	Elevated to the peerage
22 December 1703	Norwich	c(*)	Robert Davy	Thomas Palgrave	Death
13 January 1704	Petersfield	u*	Richard Markes	Leonard Bilson	Death
17 January 1704	Camelford	u*	Henry Manaton	William Pole	Chose to sit for Tavistock
1 February 1704	Bramber	c	John Middleton	Samuel Sambrooke	Void Election
22 February 1704	Wareham	u	Sir Josiah Child	Sir Edward Ernle	Death
29 March 1704	Nottinghamshire	u	Gervase Eyre	John Thornhagh	Death
18 April 1704	Lancashire	u	Richard Bold	Richard Fleetwood	Death
2 November 1704	Northampton	c*	Bartholomew Tate	Francis Arundell	Death
3 November 1704	Maidstone	c	Sir Robert Marsham	Heneage Finch	Void Election
3 November 1704	Maidstone	c*	Sir Thomas Roberts	Thomas Bliss	Void Election
4 November 1704	New Romney	u*	Sir Benjamin Bathurst	Walter Whitfield	Death
7 November 1704	Hindon	c	George Morley	Thomas Jervoise	Void Election
8 November 1704	Buckinghamshire	c*	Goodwin Wharton	Sir Richard Temple	Death
8 November 1704	Newcastle-under-Lyme	c	John Offley Crewe	John Offley Crewe	24 November 1703 by-election voided 1 February 1704
22 November 1704	Haslemere	u	Lewis Oglethorpe	Thomas Heath	Death
24 November 1704	Aylesbury	c	James Herbert	Sir Henry Parker	Death
30 November 1704	Anglesey	u*	The Viscount Bulkeley	The Viscount Bulkeley	Death
30 November 1704	Westmorland	u	Sir Christopher Musgrave	William Fleming	Death

=== 2nd Parliament of Queen Anne (1705–1707) ===
Date	Constituency	c/u	Former Incumbent	Winner	Cause
26 November 1705	Brackley	u	John Sidney	Harry Mordaunt	Succeeded to a peerage
26 November 1705	Chichester	u	William Elson	Thomas Onslow	Death
26 November 1705	Chippenham	c	Walter White	Viscount Mordaunt	Death
26 November 1705	Reading	u	Tanfield Vachell	Sir William Rich	Death
27 November 1705	Marlborough	c*	Edward Ashe	Earl of Hertford	Chose to sit for Heytesbury
28 November 1705	Warwickshire	u*	Sir Charles Shuckburgh	Andrew Archer	Death
29 November 1705	Castle Rising	u*	Sir Robert Clayton	William Feilding	Chose to sit for City of London
30 November 1705	Truro	u	Hugh Boscawen	Peregrine Bertie	Chose to sit for Cornwall
1 December 1705	Bere Alston	u*	William Cowper	Spencer Cowper	Appointed Lord Keeper of the Great Seal
1 December 1705	Bury St Edmunds	u*	Sir Robert Davers	Aubrey Porter	Chose to sit for Suffolk
3 December 1705	Buckingham	c	Sir Richard Temple	Browne Willis	Chose to sit for Buckinghamshire
3 December 1705	Northallerton	c*	Robert Dormer	Roger Gale	Chose to sit for Buckinghamshire
4 December 1705	St Germans	u*	Samuel Rolle	Edward Eliot	Chose to sit for Callington
6 December 1705	Richmond	u	Wharton Dunch	William Walsh	Death
7 December 1705	Great Bedwyn	u*	Sir George Byng	Lord Bruce	Chose to sit for Plymouth
7 December 1705	Lymington	u	Thomas Dore	Marquess of Winchester	Death
15 December 1705	Colchester	c*	Edward Bullock	Sir Thomas Webster	Death
2 January 1706	Newcastle-upon-Tyne	u*	Sir William Blackett	Sir Henry Liddell	Death
1 February 1706	Cardiff Boroughs	u*	Thomas Mansel	Sir John Aubrey	Death
27 February 1706	Buckinghamshire	u	Robert Dormer	William Egerton	Appointed Puisne Justice of the Common Pleas
2 March 1706	Wootton Bassett	u*	John Morton Pleydell	Francis Popham	Death
5 March 1706	Bishop's Castle	u	Charles Mason	Henry Newport	Chose to sit for Montgomery Boroughs
11 December 1706	Devizes	c*	John Methuen	Josiah Diston	Death
11 December 1706	Oxford	c*	Francis Norreys	Sir John Walter	Death
12 December 1706	Seaford	c*	Sir William Thomas	George Naylor	Death
16 December 1706	Sudbury	u*	Sir Gervase Elwes	Sir Hervey Elwes	Death
17 December 1706	Bodmin	c	John Hoblyn	Thomas Herne	Death
23 December 1706	Nottingham	u*	William Pierrepont	John Plumptre	Death
27 December 1706	Clitheroe	c(*)	Thomas Stringer	Daniel Harvey	Death (Two MPs elected due to a Double Return)
27 December 1706	Clitheroe	c(*)	Thomas Stringer	Christopher Parker	Death (Two MPs elected due to a Double Return)
27 December 1706	Clitheroe	c(*)	Daniel Harvey	Daniel Harvey	Harvey declared elected 22 January 1707
27 December 1706	Clitheroe	c(*)	Christopher Parker	Daniel Harvey	Harvey declared elected 22 January 1707
27 December 1706	Preston	c*	Edward Rigby	Arthur Maynwaring	Death
1 January 1707	Yorkshire	c	Sir John Kaye	The Lord Fairfax of Cameron	Death
21 January 1707	Essex	u*	Lord Walden	Thomas Middleton	Elevated to the peerage
21 January 1707	Newport (Cornwall)	u	John Sparke	Sir John Pole	Death
23 January 1707	West Looe	u	John Mountstephen	Francis Palmes	Death
20 February 1707	Bath	c*	Alexander Popham	Samuel Trotman	Death
20 February 1707	Westmorland	u	Henry Graham	Michael Fleming	Death
25 February 1707	Coventry	c*	Sir Christopher Hales	Sir Orlando Bridgeman	Void Election
25 February 1707	Coventry	c*	Thomas Gery	Edward Hopkins	Void Election
3 March 1707	Newport (I.o.W.)	u*	The Lord Cutts	Sir Tristram Dillington	Death
5 March 1707	County Durham	u	Sir William Bowes	John Tempest	Death
4 April 1707	Horsham	u	Henry Cowper	Henry Goring	Death
