= Bulkeley (surname) =

Bulkeley is a surname. Notable persons with that surname include:

- Charles Bulkeley Bulkeley-Johnson (1867–1917), British Officer
- Dewey Bulkeley (died 1735), English politician
- Elisabeth Rivers-Bulkeley (1924–2006), Austrian stock broker
- Henry Bulkeley (c. 1641–1698), English courtier and politician
- James Michael Freke Bulkeley (1761–1796), Nova Scotian civil servant and political figure
- John D. Bulkeley (1911–1996), United States Navy vice admiral
- Morgan Bulkeley (1837–1922), American politician, business and sports executive
- Richard Bulkeley (died 1621) (fl.1563–1621), Welsh politician
- Richard Bulkeley (governor) (1717–1800), Irish-born colonial governor of Nova Scotia
- Robert Bulkeley, 2nd Viscount Bulkeley (died 1688), MP for Anglesey 1660–61, Caernarvonshire 1675–79, and Anglesey 1685–89
- Robert Bulkeley (died 1702), son of 2nd Viscount, MP for Beaumaris 1701–02
- Thomas Bulkeley, 1st Viscount Bulkeley (1585–1659), North Welsh landowner and Royalist supporter during the English Civil War
- Thomas Bulkeley, 7th Viscount Bulkeley (1752–1822), English aristocrat and politician

== See also ==
- Bulkeley, a GWR 3031 Class locomotive built for and run on the Great Western Railway between 1891 and 1915; originally named North Star, renamed in 1906
