= Thomas Bulkeley =

Thomas Bulkeley may refer to:

- Thomas Bulkeley (died 1593), politician
- Thomas Bulkeley, 1st Viscount Bulkeley (1585–1659), landowner from North Wales who supported the Royalist cause
- Thomas Bulkeley (died 1708) (1633–1708), MP for Beaumaris, Anglesey, Caernarvonshire and Caernarvon Boroughs
- Thomas Bulkeley, 7th Viscount Bulkeley (1752–1822), MP for Anglesey 1774–1784
- Thomas Bulkeley (19th century MP), see Windsor
