= Robert Bulkeley =

Robert Bulkeley may refer to:

- Robert Bulkeley, 2nd Viscount Bulkeley (died 1688), MP for Anglesey 1660–61, Caernarvonshire 1675–79, and Anglesey 1685–89
- Robert Bulkeley (died 1702), son of 2nd Viscount, MP for Beaumaris 1701–02
- Robert J. Bulkley (1880–1965), American Congressman and Senator from Ohio
