= List of vice-admirals of North Wales =

Vice Admiral of North Wales
- Active: ?-1884
- Country: United Kingdom
- Branch: Royal Navy
- Type: Naval administration
- Role: Admiralty court and Naval Jurisdiction.

The Vice-Admiral of North Wales was responsible for the coastal defence of North Wales. The list of vice-admirals below also includes those of Carmarthen and Pembroke, with which for many years the Vice-Admiralty of North Wales was combined.

== History ==
As a vice-admiral, the post holder was the chief of naval administration for his district. His responsibilities included pressing men for naval service, deciding the lawfulness of prizes (captured by privateers), dealing with salvage claims for wrecks and acting as a judge.

In 1863 the Registrar of the Admiralty Court stated that the offices had 'for many years been purely honorary' (HCA 50/24 pp. 235–6). Appointments were made by the Lord High Admiral when this officer existed. When the admiralty was in commission appointments were made by the crown by letters patent under the seal of the admiralty court.

== Vice-admirals of North Wales ==
Source (1559–1660):

Source (1660–1884):

- 1559 – William Wood (Anglesey and Merioneth)
- 1562 – Lewis Griffith (Denbigh and Flint)
- 1563 – John Gwynne (Caernarvon)
- 1567 – Sir Nicholas Arnold (Merioneth)
- 1567 – Richard Bulkeley (Anglesey, Caernarvon and Merioneth)
- 1571 – William Wynn (Caernarvon and Merioneth)
- 1574 – John Lloyd (Caernarvon)
- 1577–1584 – Sir Richard Bulkeley (Anglesey, Caernarvon and Merioneth)
- 1579 – William Wynne (Flint)
- 1585 – Robert Dudley, 1st Earl of Leicester (died 1588)
- 1587–1592 – no appointments known
- 1592–1605 – Richard Leveson
- 1605–1627 – Sir Richard Trevor
- 1627 – John Griffith
- 1644 – Sir Thomas Myddleton
- 1647 – Thomas Glynne
- 1647 – Thomas Mytton (died 1656)
- 1649–1660 – No appointment known
- 1660–1666 – Sir John Owen
- 1666–1679 – John Robinson
- 1679–1688 – Robert Bulkeley, 2nd Viscount Bulkeley
- 1688–1696 – Sir William Williams, 6th Baronet
- 1697–1701 – Hugh Nanney
- 1701–1702 – Richard Bulkeley, 3rd Viscount Bulkeley
- 1702–1710 – Richard Bulkeley, 4th Viscount Bulkeley
- 1710–1711 – Sir Arthur Owen, 3rd Baronet
- 1711–1715 – Richard Bulkeley, 4th Viscount Bulkeley
- 1715–1753 – Sir Arthur Owen, 3rd Baronet
- 1753–1776 – Sir William Owen, 4th Baronet (also Vice-Admiral of Pembroke 1761–<1776)
- 1775–1786 – Sir Hugh Owen, 5th Baronet (also Vice-Admiral of Pembroke 1775–1786)
- 1786–1790 – Office vacant
- 1790–1812 – Henry Paget, 1st Earl of Uxbridge (also Vice-Admiral of Carmarthen 1790–1812 and Vice-Admiral of Pembroke 1790–1812)
- 1812–1854 – Henry Paget, 1st Marquess of Anglesey (also Vice-Admiral of Carmarthen 1812–1854)
- 1854–1884 – Edward Mostyn Lloyd-Mostyn, 2nd Baron Mostyn (also Vice-Admiral of Carmarthen 1854–1884)

== Vice-admirals of Carmarthen ==
- John Ashburnham, 1st Earl of Ashburnham 1734–1737
- not known 1737–1747
- Richard Vaughan 1747–
- George Rice 1755–1779
- office vacant 1779–1790
- Henry Paget, 1st Earl of Uxbridge 1790–1812 (also Vice-Admiral of North Wales 1790–1812 and Vice-Admiral of Pembroke 1790–1812)
- Henry Paget, 1st Marquess of Anglesey 1812–1854 (also Vice-Admiral of North Wales 1812–1854)
- Edward Lloyd-Mostyn, 2nd Baron Mostyn 1854–1884 (also Vice-Admiral of North Wales 1854–1884)

== Vice-admirals of Pembroke ==
- Sir William Owen, 4th Baronet 1734–<1776 (also Vice-Admiral of North Wales 1753–<1776)
- Sir Hugh Owen, 5th Baronet 1775–1786 (also Vice-Admiral of North Wales 1775–1786)
- Office vacant 1786–1790
- Henry Paget, 1st Earl of Uxbridge 1790–1812 (also Vice-Admiral of North Wales 1790–1812)
- Sir John Owen, 1st Baronet 1812–1861
