= Henry Bulkeley =

English courtier and politician (died 1698)

The Honourable Henry Bulkeley

Master of the Household
- In office 1678–1688
- Preceded by: Sir Herbert Price
- Succeeded by: Sir Thomas Felton, Bt

Member of Parliament for Beaumaris
- In office July 1679 – 1681
- Preceded by: Richard Bulkeley
- Succeeded by: Henry Bulkeley

Member of Parliament for Anglesey
- In office March 1679 – July 1679
- Preceded by: Nicholas Bagenall
- Succeeded by: Richard Bulkeley

Personal details
- Born: c. 1641
- Died: 1698
- Spouse: Sophia Stewart (m. 1673; died 1698)
- Relations: Robert Bulkeley (nephew)
- Parent(s): Thomas Bulkeley, 1st Viscount Bulkeley; Blanche Coytmore
- Education: Gray's Inn; Queens' College, Cambridge

The Hon. Henry Bulkeley (c. 1641 – 1698) was an English courtier and politician. He was Master of the Household to Charles II and James II of England. He also was Member of parliament for Anglesey from February to August 1679 and for Beaumaris in October 1679 and from 1681 and 1685.

== Early life ==
Henry was born about 1641. He was the fourth son of Thomas Bulkeley and his wife Blanche Coytmore. Among his siblings were Robert Bulkeley, 2nd Viscount Bulkeley and Thomas Bulkeley.

His father was created Viscount Bulkeley of Cashel, County Tipperary, Ireland, in 1643. His father's family were the Bulkeleys of Baronhill, Anglesey.

Bulkeley studied at Gray's Inn, where he was admitted in 1654, and at Queens' College, Cambridge, where he matriculated in 1657.

== Career ==
In 1664, he became an ensign in the Kings Guards in the Irish Army. From about 1669 to 1678 he was a captain.

In 1678, Bulkeley became Master of the Household, a sinecure. He was appointed by Charles II and maintained in office by James II of England at his accession to the throne in 1685.

=== Member of Parliament ===
At the time the Isle of Anglesey sent two members of parliament to the Parliament of England, one as knight of the shire for the county, another for the boroughs on the island. This latter seat was called Beaumaris Boroughs, after the town and castle of Beaumaris.

The year 1679 saw two elections. In February Bulkeley was elected for the County of Anglesey in the Habeas Corpus Parliament. In August he was elected MP for Beaumaris Boroughs for the Exclusion Bill Parliament. He was then reelected for the same seat in 1681 for the Oxford Parliament and in 1685 for the Loyal Parliament.

=== Later life ===
In 1688 at the Glorious Revolution Bulkeley fled with James II to France. He lived at the exile court at Saint Germain-en-Laye until he returned to England in January 1691 as a Jacobite agent.

In 1695 Bulkeley was back in Saint Germain where he quarrelled with Donough MacCarthy, 4th Earl of Clancarty. In 1696, at the attempted assassination of King William, Bulkeley was in England and signed the Association to show his loyalty.

== Personal life ==
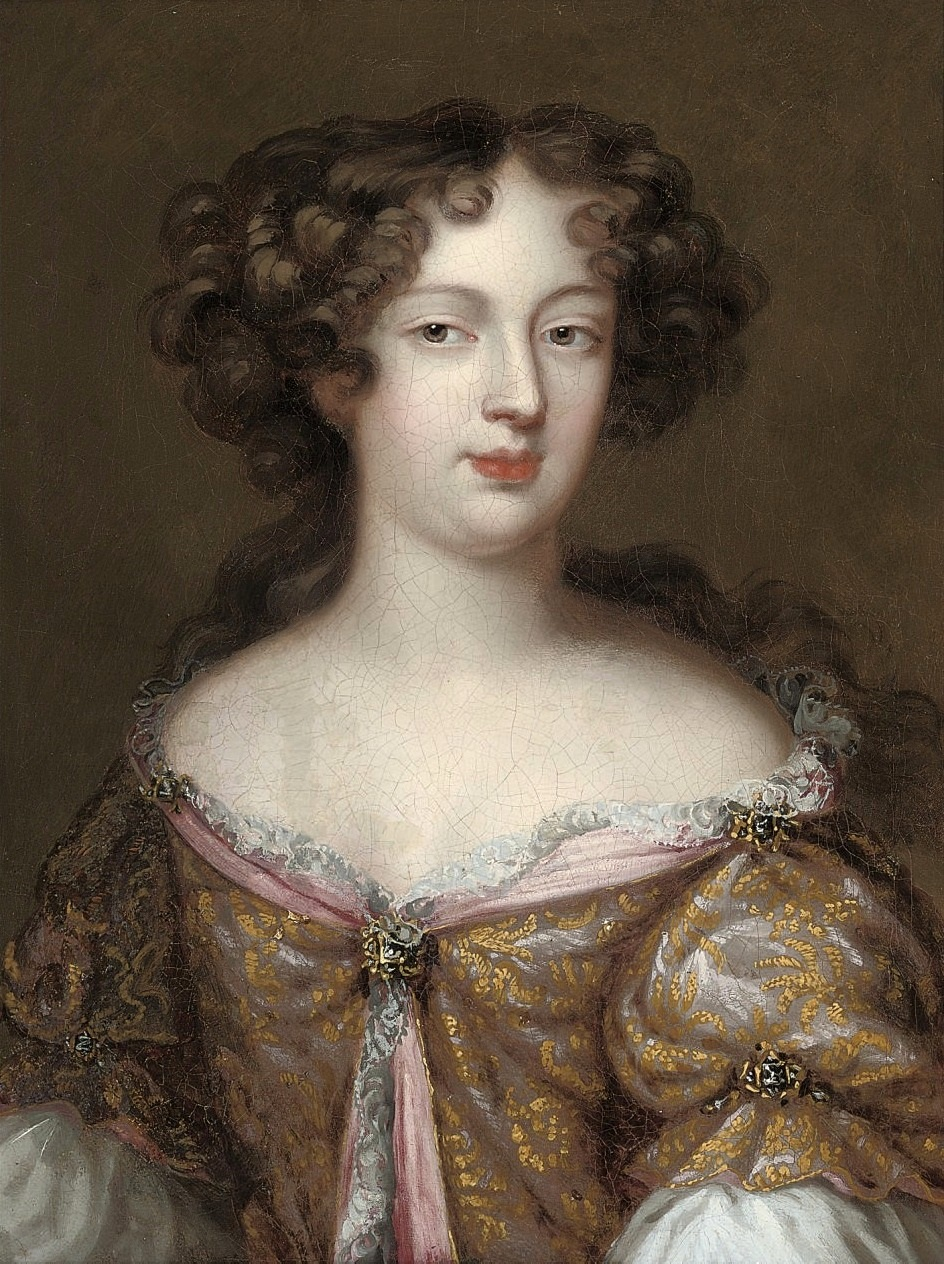
Portrait of his wife, Sophia, by Henri Gascar

Around November 1673 Bulkeley married Sophia Stewart, maid of honour to Queen Catherine of Braganza. A sister of the Duchess of Richmond, Sophie was a daughter of Dr. Walter Stewart and granddaughter of the 1st Lord Blantyre. Together, they were the parents of six children, including:

- Francis Bulkeley (1686–1756), a lieutenant-general, who married Marie-Anne O'Mahony, daughter of Daniel O'Mahony (d. 1714) and Cecilia Weld, and widow of Richard Cantillon.
- Anne Bulkeley (c. 1675–1751), who married James FitzJames, 1st Duke of Berwick, illegitimate son of James II.
- Charlotte Bulkeley (b. c. 1678), who married Charles O'Brien, 5th Viscount Clare. After his death, she married Count Daniel O'Mahony.
- Henrietta Bulkeley, who died unmarried
- Laura Bulkeley, who died unmarried

Bulkeley committed suicide in 1698. In his will he told his son to return to England and conform to the established religion.

Parliament of England
Preceded by Nicholas Bagenall	Member of Parliament for Anglesey; Mar–Jul 1679	Succeeded by Richard Bulkeley
Preceded by Richard Bulkeley	Member of Parliament for Beaumaris; Jul 1679–1681	Succeeded by Henry Bulkeley
Court offices
Preceded by Sir Herbert Price	Master of the Household; 1678–1688	Succeeded by Sir Thomas Felton, Bt
