= William Jones (Parliamentarian) =

Welsh lawyer and politician

William Jones was a Welsh lawyer and politician who sat in the House of Commons between 1647 and 1648.

Jones was the son of Sir William Jones and his wife Margaret Griffith, daughter of Griffith ap John Griffith of Kevenamulch, Carnarvonshire. His father was a judge and MP. Jones was a barrister and he and his brother Charles were joint prothonotaries and clerks of the crown for Denbighshire and Montgomeryshire but surrendered the positions in November 1636. In 1647, Jones was elected Member of Parliament for Beaumaris in the Long Parliament. He was excluded from sitting under Pride's Purge in the following year.

Jones became recorder of Shrewsbury on 1 March 1655 and held the position until 1660.

Parliament of England
Preceded by John Griffith	Member of Parliament for Beaumaris; 1647–1648	Succeeded by Not represented in Rump Parliament
