= William Vaughan (MP) =

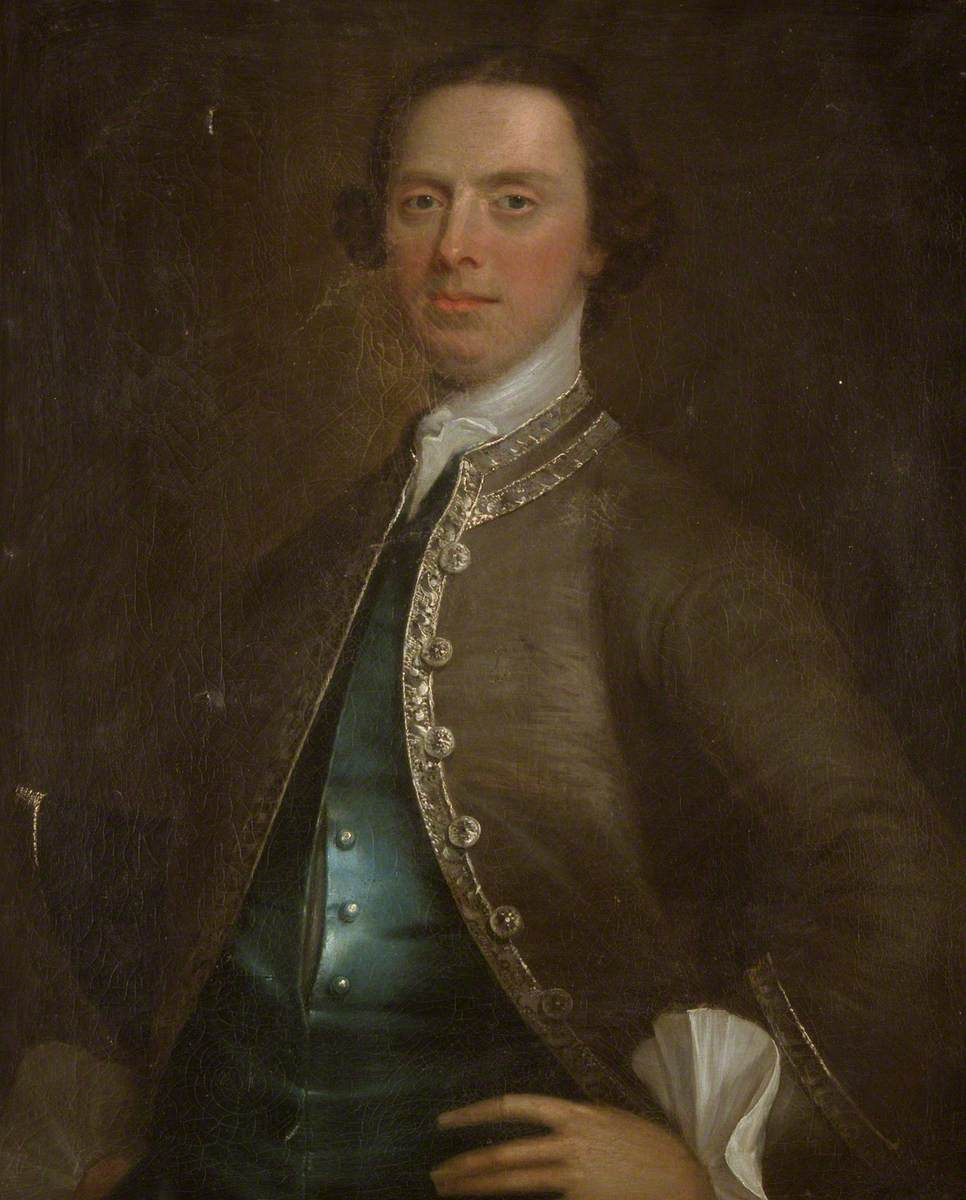

Lord Lieutenant of Merionethshire
- In office 1762–1775

Custos Rotulorum of Merionethshire
- In office 1731–1775

Member of Parliament for Merioneth
- In office 1734–1768
- Preceded by: Richard Vaughan
- Succeeded by: John Pugh Pryse

Personal details
- Born: c. 1707
- Died: 12 April 1775 (aged 67–68)
- Spouse: Catherine Nanney
- Relations: Evan Lloyd Vaughan (brother); Hugh Nanney (father-in-law)
- Children: 1
- Parent: Richard Vaughan (father)
- Education: St John's College, Cambridge

William Vaughan (c. 1707–12 April 1775) of Corsygedol, Merioneth was a Welsh politician.

== Biography ==
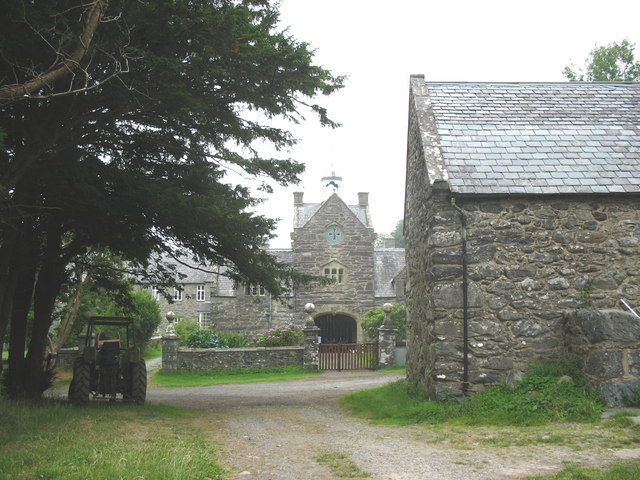
Corsygedol

He was the eldest son of Richard Vaughan of Corsygedol and educated at Chester and Mortlake schools and St John's College, Cambridge (1726). He succeeded his father in 1734. Evan Lloyd Vaughan was his younger brother.

He was the Lord Lieutenant of Merionethshire 1762–1775, Custos Rotulorum of Merionethshire 1731–1775 and Member of Parliament (MP) for Merionethshire from 1734 to 1768.

He married his cousin Catherine, the daughter and coheiress of Hugh Nanney, M.P., of Nannau, Merioneth, with whom he had a daughter who predeceased him. He was succeeded by his brother Evan.

Parliament of the United Kingdom
Preceded by Richard Vaughan	Member of Parliament for Merionethshire; 1734–1768	Succeeded by John Pugh Pryse
