= Evan Lloyd Vaughan =

Welsh constable of Harlech Castle

Member of Parliament for Merioneth
- In office 1774–1791
- Preceded by: John Pugh Pryse
- Succeeded by: Sir Robert Vaughan

High Sheriff of Denbighshire
- In office 1766-1767
- Preceded by: Thomas Kyffin
- Succeeded by: John Davies

Personal details
- Born: c. 1709
- Died: 4 December 1791 (aged 81–82)
- Parent: Richard Vaughan (father)
- Relatives: William Vaughan (brother)
- Education: St John's College, Cambridge

Evan Lloyd Vaughan (c. 1709–1791) was a Welsh politician who sat in the House of Commons from 1774 to 1791.

== Biography ==
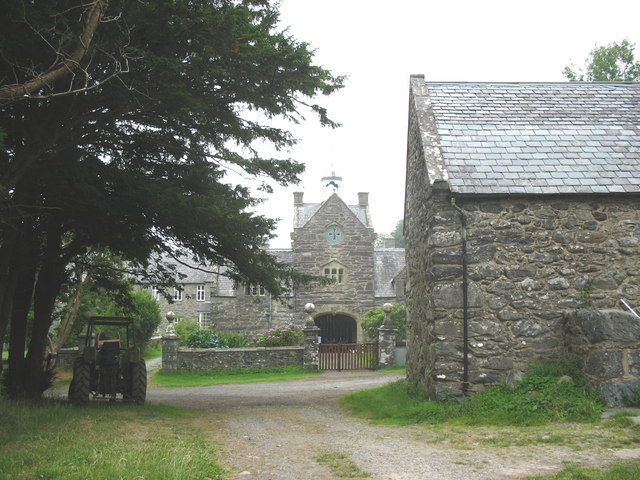
Corsygedol

Vaughan was the son of Richard Vaughan MP and his wife Margaret Lloyd, daughter of Sir Evan Lloyd of Bodidris, Denbighshire. He was educated at Eton College from 1725 to 1727 and was admitted at St John's College, Cambridge in 1728. He was Constable of Harlech Castle from July 1754 and High Sheriff of Denbighshire in 1766–7. He succeeded his brother to Corsygedol in 1775.

Vaughan was unwilling to stand at Merioneth in the 1768 general election when his brother William Vaughan declined re-election. J. Pugh Pryse was returned instead and when Pryse died in January 1774, Vaughan was still reluctant to stand. However he was returned unopposed as Member of Parliament for Merioneth in the by-election on 24 February 1774. At the 1774 general election soon after he had to fight a contested election, which showed the strength of the Vaughan interest. All his subsequent elections in 1780, 1784 and 1790 were uncontested. There is no record of his having spoken in the House before 1790. Contemporary parliamentary historian Thomas Oldfield described him in 1816 as “one of the last independent members of the old constitutional school”.

Vaughan died unmarried on 4 December 1791.

Parliament of Great Britain
Preceded by John Pugh Pryse	Member of Parliament for Merioneth; 1774–1791	Succeeded by Sir Robert Vaughan
