= Lists of United Kingdom by-elections =

The list of by-elections in the United Kingdom is divided chronologically by parliament:

== Parliament of England ==
- List of English by-elections (1689–1700)
- List of English by-elections (1701–1707)

== Parliament of Great Britain ==
- List of Great Britain by-elections (1707–1715)
- List of Great Britain by-elections (1715–1734)
- List of Great Britain by-elections (1734–1754)
- List of Great Britain by-elections (1754–1774)
- List of Great Britain by-elections (1774–1790)
- List of Great Britain by-elections (1790–1800)

== Parliament of the United Kingdom ==
- List of United Kingdom by-elections (1801–1806)
- List of United Kingdom by-elections (1806–1818)
- List of United Kingdom by-elections (1818–1832)
- List of United Kingdom by-elections (1832–1847)
- List of United Kingdom by-elections (1847–1857)
- List of United Kingdom by-elections (1857–1868)
- List of United Kingdom by-elections (1868–1885)
- List of United Kingdom by-elections (1885–1900)
- List of United Kingdom by-elections (1900–1918)
- List of United Kingdom by-elections (1918–1931)
- List of United Kingdom by-elections (1931–1950)
- List of United Kingdom by-elections (1950–1979)
- List of United Kingdom by-elections (1979–2010)
- List of United Kingdom by-elections (2010–2024)
- List of United Kingdom by-elections (2024–present)
- By-elections to the House of Lords (hereditary peers)

== Other parliaments ==
- List of by-elections to the Scottish Parliament
- List of by-elections to the Senedd
- List of European Parliament by-elections in the United Kingdom
- List of Northern Ireland Parliament by-elections (1921–1972)
- Northern Ireland Assembly vacancies are filled by co-option

== Local government ==
Local government by-election results are generally given on the page for the last election in that area, see Category:Council elections in the United Kingdom

== See also ==
- United Kingdom by-election records
- List of United Kingdom general elections
- Category:By-elections in dependent territories of the United Kingdom
