= William Bulkeley =

William Bulkeley may refer to:

- William Bulkeley (Welsh politician) (16th century)
- William Bulkeley (priest) (17th century)
- William Bulkeley (diarist) (1691−1760), Welsh landowner and diarist
- William Bulkeley (merchant) (18th century)
- William H. Bulkeley (1840–1902), American politician

== See also ==
- William Bulkeley Hughes, 19th-century Welsh politician
- Williams-Bulkeley baronets
