= Berkeley Paget =

British politician

Member of Parliament for Milborne Port
- In office 1820–1826

Member of Parliament for Anglesey
- In office 1807–1820

Personal details
- Born: 2 January 1780
- Died: 26 October 1842 (aged 62)
- Spouse: Sophia Bucknall (m. 1804)
- Children: 7, including Frederick
- Parent: Henry Paget (father)
- Relatives: Henry Paget (brother); Arthur Paget (brother); Edward Paget (brother); Charles Paget (brother); William Paget (brother)

The Honourable Berkeley Thomas Paget (2 January 1780 – 26 October 1842) was a British politician.

== Background ==
Paget was the sixth son of Henry Paget, 1st Earl of Uxbridge, and Jane, daughter of the Very Reverend Arthur Champagné. He was the younger brother of Henry Paget, 1st Marquess of Anglesey; Sir Arthur Paget; Sir Edward Paget; and Sir Charles Paget.

== Political career ==
Paget succeeded his elder brother Sir Arthur Paget as Member of Parliament for Anglesey in 1807. In 1810 he was appointed a lord of the treasury by Spencer Perceval, a post he retained when Lord Liverpool became prime minister in 1812 after Perceval's assassination. In 1820 he became Member of Parliament for Milborne Port, succeeding another brother, Sir Edward Paget. He continued to represent this constituency and remained a lord of the treasury until in 1826.

== Death ==
Paget died on 28 October 1842, aged 62, at Hampton Court Palace. He left his property to his wife.

== Family ==
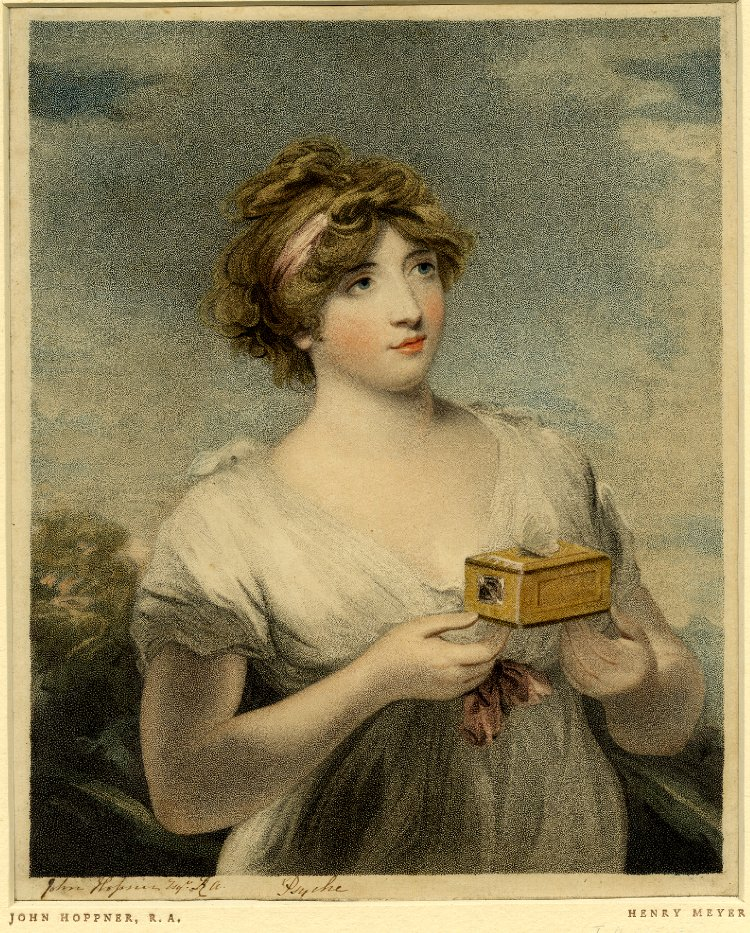
Psyche: Sophia Askell Bucknall, before her marriage to Berkeley Paget, by Henry Hoppner Meyer

Berkeley married in 1804 Sophia, daughter of the Hon. William Bucknall (earlier William Grimston, MP) and Sophia Hoare, and granddaughter of James Grimston, 2nd Viscount Grimston. She survived him by 17 years, and died in February 1859. They had four sons and three daughters. The children were:

- Gertrude Jane, who married the future Standish O'Grady, 2nd Viscount Guillamore.
- Frederick, captain in the Coldstream Guards and MP for Beaumaris. He married Maria Georgiana Grenfell.
- Eleanor, married in 1825 the future William Jolliffe, 1st Baron Hylton.
- Catesby Paget, captain in the 7th Foot, married in 1839 Florinda Frances Mason (died 1842), daughter of Thomas Monck Mason R.N. He subsequently married Adelaide Stapleton, daughter of Miles John Stapleton, who died in 1860; and then Emily Armit, daughter of Richard Armit.
- Matilda-Susannah.
- Leopold Grimston, a colonel in the Royal Artillery, whose son Wellesley Paget became a brigadier-general in the Royal Artillery. He married Georgiana Theodosia Halsey.
- Lennox, died young.

Parliament of the United Kingdom
Preceded by Hon. Sir Arthur Paget	Member of Parliament for Anglesey; 1807–1820	Succeeded by Earl of Uxbridge
Preceded by Hon. Sir Edward Paget; Robert Casberd	Member of Parliament for Milborne Port; 1820–1826; With: The Lord Graves	Succeeded by The Lord Graves; Arthur Chichester
