= Hugh Nanney =

Welsh Member of Parliament and Vice-Admiral of North Wales

Vice-Admiral of North Wales
- In office 1697–1701
- Preceded by: William Williams
- Succeeded by: Richard Bulkeley

Member of Parliament for Merioneth
- In office 1695–1701
- Preceded by: John Wynn
- Succeeded by: Richard Vaughan

Personal details
- Born: c. 1669
- Died: 1701 (aged 31–32)
- Spouse: Catherine Vaughan (m. 1690)
- Children: 4
- Relatives: William Vaughan (son-in-law); Richard Vaughan (brother-in-law)
- Education: Jesus College, Oxford

Hugh Nanney (c. 1669 – 1701) of Nannau Hall, near Dolgellau, was a Welsh Member of Parliament and Vice-Admiral of North Wales.

== Biography ==
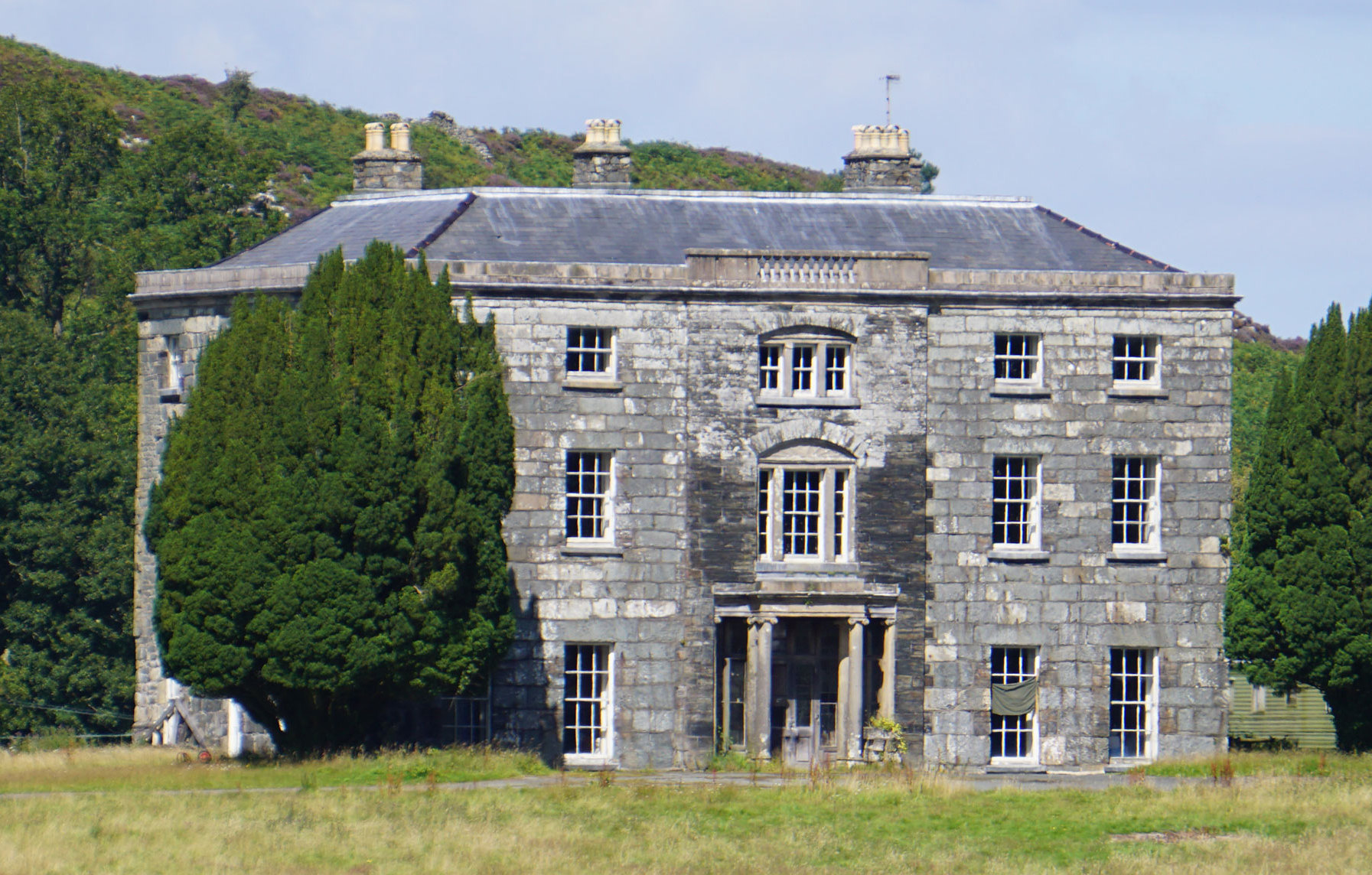
Nannau Hall, Gwynedd

He was the 2nd son of Hugh Nanney of Nannau Hall and educated at Eton College and Jesus College, Oxford where he matriculated in 1687. He entered Lincoln's Inn in 1687 to study law. He succeeded his elder brother to the family estate.

He was elected the Member of Parliament for the constituency of Merioneth in the Parliament of 1695.

He was appointed Vice-Admiral of North Wales to serve from 1697 to his death in 1701, and commanded the combined Caernarfonshire and Merionethshire Militia in 1697.

He had married in 1690, Catherine, the daughter of William Vaughan of Cors-y-Gedol, Merionethshire and the widow of Griffith Wynn. They had 4 daughters; his heiress Janet married Robert Vaughan of Hengwrt, to which family Nannau passed.
