= Richard Bulkeley, 5th Viscount Bulkeley =

British Member of Parliament (1707–1739)

Richard Bulkeley, 5th Viscount Bulkeley (8 April 1707 – 15 March 1739) of Baron Hill, Anglesey was a Welsh landowner and Tory politician who sat in the House of Commons from 1730 to 1738.

== Early life ==
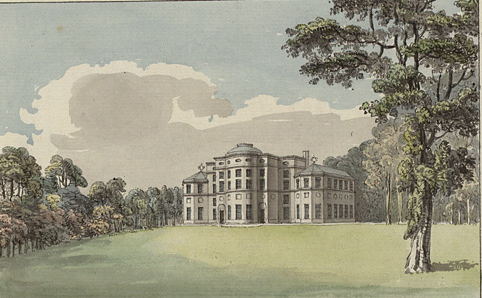
Baron Hill, Anglesey, the seat of the Bulkeley family, in 1776. Now a ruin.

Bulkeley was the eldest son of Richard Bulkeley, 4th Viscount Bulkeley and his wife Bridget Bertie, daughter of James Bertie, 1st Earl of Abingdon. He was educated at Westminster School in 1718. On his father's death on 4 June 1724, he succeeded to the family estate at Baron Hill, and the Irish peerage as Viscount Bulkeley. In 1725 he was appointed Chamberlain of North Wales and constable of Beaumaris castle and held the posts for the rest of his life.

== Career ==
Bulkeley was returned unopposed as Member of Parliament for Beaumaris at a by-election on 25 March 1730. A Tory like his father, he voted with consistency against the Whig government of Robert Walpole. He was returned unopposed as MP for Beaumaris at the 1734 British general election.

== Family and legacy ==
Bulkeley married Jane Owen, daughter and heiress of Lewis Owen of Peniarth, Merionethshire in Oswestry on 8 January 1732. He died without issue, aged 31, on 15 March 1739, and was succeeded by his brother James.

Parliament of Great Britain
| Preceded by Watkin Williams-Wynn | Member of Parliament for Beaumaris; 1730–1738 | Succeeded by James Bulkeley |
Peerage of Ireland
| Preceded by Richard Bulkeley | Viscount Bulkeley; 1724–1738 | Succeeded by James Bulkeley |
