= William Owen Stanley =

British politician

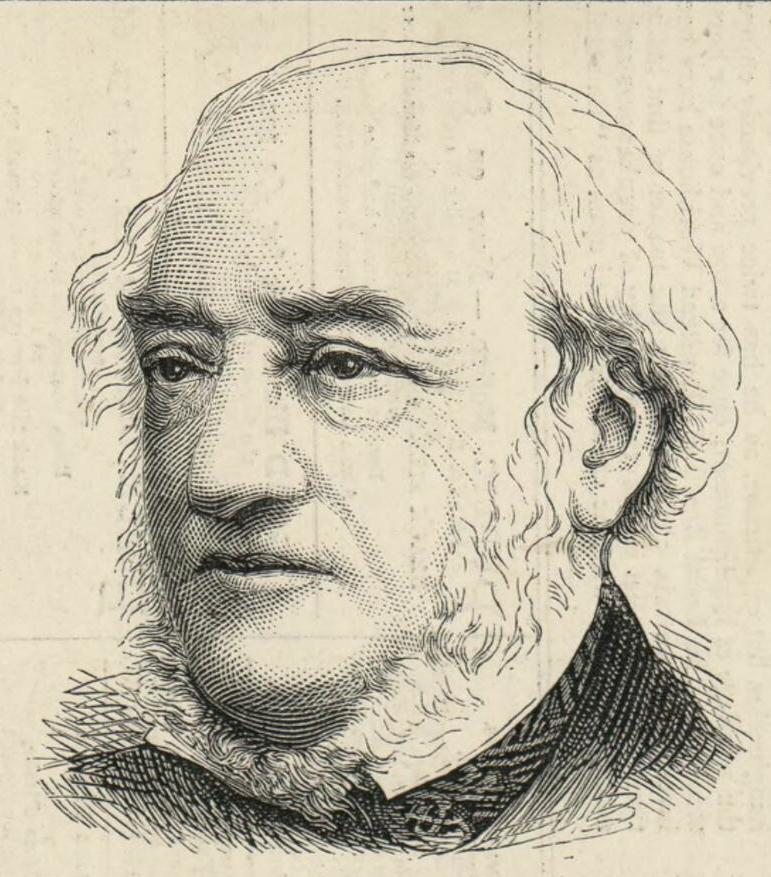
- William Owen Stanley

Lord Lieutenant of Anglesey
- In office 2 March 1869 – 24 February 1884

Member of Parliament for Beaumaris
- In office 1857–1874

Member of Parliament for City of Chester
- In office 1850–1857

Member of Parliament for Anglesey
- In office 1837–1847

Personal details
- Born: 13 November 1802
- Died: 24 February 1884 (aged 81)
- Party: Liberal
- Spouse: Ellin Williams (m. 1832)
- Parent(s): John and Maria Stanley
- Relatives: Edward Stanley (brother); John Holroyd (grandfather); John Stanley (grandfather)

Hon. William Owen Stanley (13 November 1802 – 24 February 1884) was a British Liberal Party politician.

== Life ==
Stanley was the son of John Stanley, 1st Baron Stanley of Alderley, and Lady Maria Josepha, daughter of John Holroyd, 1st Earl of Sheffield. His elder twin brother was Edward Stanley, 2nd Baron Stanley of Alderley. He became a solicitor. Stanley married Ellin Williams, daughter of Sir John Williams of Bodelwyddan, Flintshire in 1832. He was heir to Penrhos estate in Anglesey where he lived throughout his life.

Stanley was a member of parliament (MP) for Anglesey 1837–1847, City of Chester 1850–1857 and Beaumaris 1857–1874. He was also the Lord Lieutenant of Anglesey 2 March 1869 – 24 February 1884, Stanley was a captain and adjutant in the Grenadier Guards. As an antiquarian of wide reputation, he was the author of Anglesey (1871) and contributed many Celtic contributions, especially on Celtic subjects and his excavations at Holyhead and Castell, Anglesey, to Archaeologia Cambrensis. In 1855 he oversaw the building of Holyhead Market Hall, which stands today, albeit as a library and offices.

Stanley donated a collection of antiquities from Anglesey to the British Museum in 1870 and 1881. His monument is in St Cybi's Church, Holyhead.

Parliament of the United Kingdom
Preceded by Sir Richard Williams-Bulkeley, Bt	Member of Parliament for Anglesey; 1837–1847	Succeeded by Sir Richard Williams-Bulkeley, Bt
Preceded by Sir John Jervis	Member of Parliament for City of Chester; 1850–1857	Succeeded by Enoch Gibbon Salisbury
Preceded by Lord George Paget	Member of Parliament for Beaumaris; 1857–1874	Succeeded by Morgan Lloyd
