= Charles Jones (MP for Beaumaris) =

Welsh lawyer and politician

Charles Jones was a Welsh lawyer and politician who sat in the House of Commons at various times between 1624 and 1640.

Jones was the son of Sir William Jones and his wife Margaret Griffith, daughter of Griffith ap John Griffith of Kevenamulch, Carnarvonshire. His father was a judge and MP. Jones was a barrister of Lincoln's Inn and was recorder of Beaumaris in 1625. In 1624, Jones was elected Member of Parliament for Beaumaris. He was re-elected to the seat in 1625, 1626 and 1628 when he sat until 1629 when King Charles decided to rule without parliament for eleven years. He and his brother William were joint prothonotaries and clerks of the crown for Denbighshire and Montgomeryshire but surrendered the positions in November 1636.

By 1640 Jones was recorder of Monmouth. In April 1640, he was elected MP for Beaumaris and for Monmouth Boroughs in the Short Parliament.

Jones was the proprietor of Castell-March.

Parliament of England
Preceded by Sampson Eure	Member of Parliament for Beaumaris; 1624–1629	Parliament suspended until 1640
Vacant Parliament suspended since 1629	Member of Parliament for Beaumaris; 1640	Succeeded by John Griffith
Vacant Parliament suspended since 1629	Member of Parliament for Monmouth Boroughs; 1640	Succeeded by Thomas Trevor
