= John Aislabie =

English politician (1670–1742)

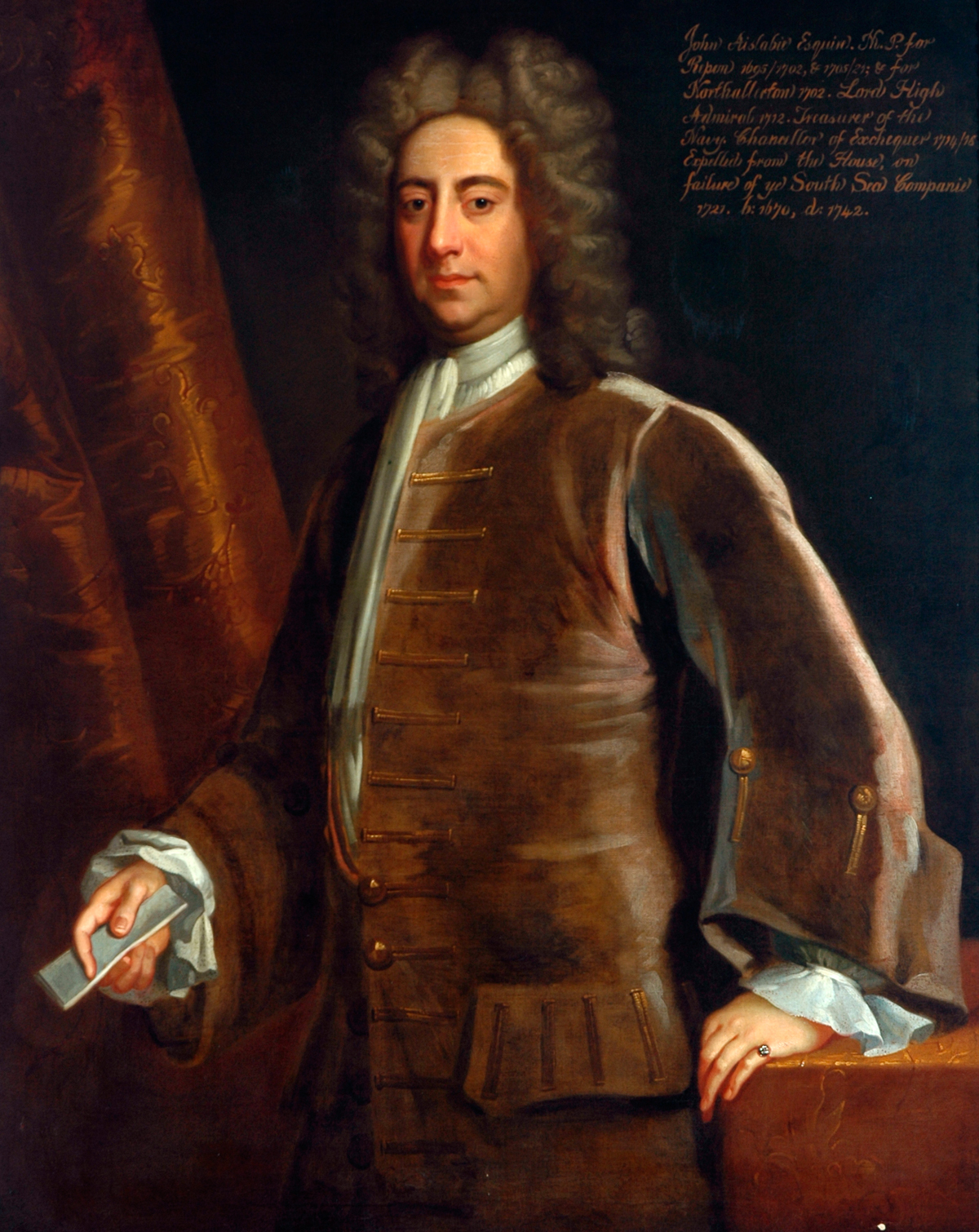

Chancellor of the Exchequer
- In office 20 March 1718 – 23 January 1721
- Monarch: George I
- Preceded by: The Viscount Stanhope
- Succeeded by: Sir John Pratt (interim)

Personal details
- Born: 4 December 1670
- Died: 18 June 1742 (aged 71)
- Party: Whig
- Relations: William Aislabie (son)
- Education: St John's College, Cambridge; Trinity Hall, Cambridge

John Aislabie (or Aslabie; /ˈeɪzləbi/; 4 December 1670 – 18 June 1742), of Studley Royal, near Ripon, Yorkshire, was a British politician who sat in the English and British House of Commons from 1695 to 1721. He was of an independent mind, and did not stick regularly to the main parties. He was Chancellor of the Exchequer at the time of the South Sea Bubble and his involvement with the Company led to his resignation and disgrace.

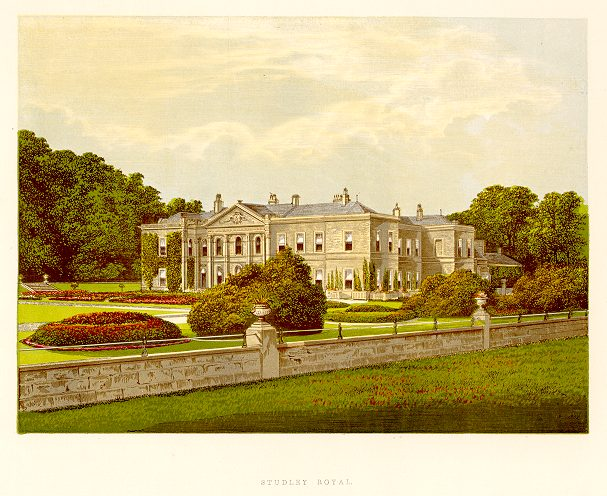
Studley Royal (1880)

== Background and education ==
Aislabie's family were originally Yeoman farmers who lived in Hemingbrough. His father George Aislabie married into the highly influential Mallory family through Mary Mallory, daughter of Sir John Mallory of Studley Royal. He was educated at St Peter's School, York under the headship of Mr Thomlinson and admitted at St. John's College, Cambridge, in 1687 and at Trinity Hall, Cambridge, in 1692. He inherited the Studley estate from his mother's family in 1693, and started serious development of the garden around 1716. He was the first in England to introduce natural landscaping and created the water garden at Studley Royal. His son, William Aislabie, added the ruins of Fountains Abbey to the estate.

== Political career ==
Aislabie was elected as a member of parliament for Ripon at the 1695 English general election, apparently on the assumption he was a Tory, though his political views were somewhat fluid. He voted for the attainder of Sir John Fenwick on 25 November 1696. He was returned again for Ripon at the 1698 English general election. The loss of his wife and daughter in a house fire in January 1700 may have dampened his political activity for a while. He was returned again for Ripon at the two general elections of 1701, and he kept well enough in with Robert Harley to be classed as a Tory. He was elected Mayor of Ripon for the year 1702 to 1703, and was returned instead as MP for Northallerton at the 1702 English general election in an exchange deal with William Hustler. As mayor he was generous in paying for the reconstruction of the Market Cross, and making gifts to the corporation. He became more active in politics from 1704, especially on the economy. At the 1705 English general election, he was returned again for Ripon and voted for the Court candidate as speaker on 25 October 1705. He eventually became associated with the Country Whigs. Under the patronage of Robert Harley he was appointed a Lord of the Admiralty from 1710 in the Tory administration. This proved a precarious appointment as Aislabie's Whig sympathies manifested in votes against the government.

When the Whigs returned to office in 1714, Aislabie was made Treasurer of the Navy. He became an ally of the Earl of Sunderland who became, in effect, Prime Minister in 1718. Sunderland appointed Aislabie as Chancellor of the Exchequer. When in 1719 the South Sea Company proposed a deal whereby it would take over the national debt in exchange for government bonds, Aislabie was a very strong supporter of the scheme and negotiated the contract; he piloted the Bill through the House of Commons. The South Sea Company had been built on high expectations which it could never fulfil, and it collapsed in August 1720. An investigation by Parliament found that Aislabie had been given £20,000 of company stock in exchange for his promotion of the scheme. He resigned the Exchequer in January 1721, and in March was found guilty by the Commons of the "most notorious, dangerous and infamous corruption". He was expelled from the House, removed from the Privy Council, and imprisoned in the Tower of London.

== Later life and contributions ==
After his release from prison, he retired to his estate and continued the development of the gardens.

The Ripon Obelisk in the Market Square, Ripon, the first in England, was provided by John Aislabie in 1702, and is now grade I listed.

In 1723, Aislabie constructed Waverley Abbey House on the site of former Cistercian Waverley Abbey in Surrey.

John's son William Aislabie would also serve in Parliament for the Ripon constituency.

Political offices
Preceded by Charles Caesar	Treasurer of the Navy; 1714–1718	Succeeded by Richard Hampden
Preceded by James Stanhope	Chancellor of the Exchequer; 1718–1721	Succeeded by Sir John Pratt
Parliament of England
Preceded by Sir Jonathan Jennings; Jonathan Jennings	Member of Parliament for Ripon; 1695–1702; With: Jonathan Jennings 1695–1701; John Sharp 1701–1702	Succeeded by John Sharp; Sir William Hustler
Preceded by Sir William Hustler; Daniel Lascelles	Member of Parliament for Northallerton; 1702–1705; With: Sir William Hustler 1702; Robert Dormer 1702–1705	Succeeded by Robert Dormer; Sir William Hustler
Preceded by John Sharp; Sir William Hustler	Member of Parliament for Ripon; 1705–1707; With: John Sharp	Succeeded by Parliament of Great Britain
Parliament of Great Britain
Preceded by Parliament of England	Member of Parliament for Ripon; 1707–1721; With: John Sharp 1707–1715; The Viscount Castlecomer 1715–1719; William Aislabie the elder 1719–1721	Succeeded by William Aislabie the elder William Aislabie the younger
