= Arthur Paget =

Arthur Paget may refer to:

- Sir Arthur Paget (diplomat) (1771–1840), British diplomat and politician
- Sir Arthur Paget (British Army officer) (1851–1928), soldier and diplomat, who served in Belgrade and Ireland
