= William Jones (judge) =

Welsh judge and Member of Parliament

Sir William Jones
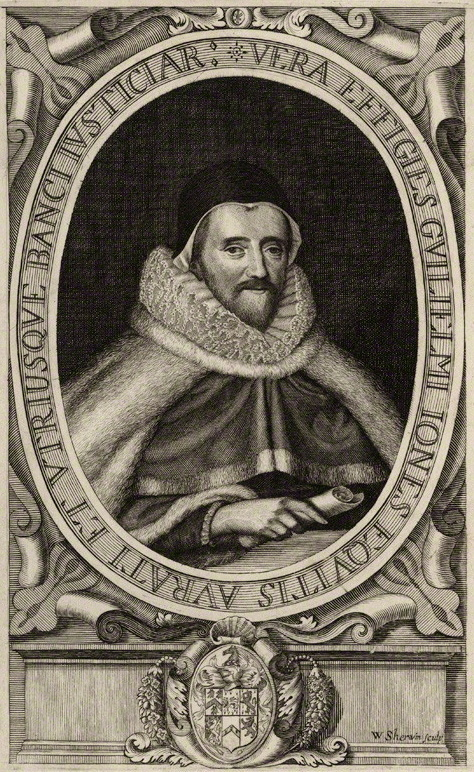
- Sir William Jones in a 1675 engraving by William Sherwin

Member of the 1597, 1604 and 1614 Parliament for Beaumaris

Member of the 1601 Parliament for Caernarvonshire

Personal details
- Born: 1566 Cesail Gyfarch also recorded as Castellmarch and archaically Hyssoilfarch, Penmorfa, Caernarfonshire.
- Died: 9 December 1640
- Children: Charles

Sir William Jones (1566–1640) was a Welsh judge, and a Member of Parliament (MP) for the Welsh Borough of Beaumaris.

== Life ==
From a family settled in North Wales, he was eldest son of William Jones of Castellmarch, Carnarvonshire, by Margaret, daughter of Humphry Wynn ap Meredith of Hyssoilfarch. Educated at first at Beaumaris free school, he went at the age of fourteen to St. Edmund's Hall, Oxford, where he did not graduate.

He entered Furnival's Inn five years later, was admitted a member of Lincoln's Inn on 5 July 1587, and called to the bar there on 28 January 1595. He was Lent reader of the inn in 1616 and was made a serjeant and knight on 14 March 1617; on 13 May of the same year he was appointed Lord Chief Justice of the King's Bench for Ireland, in succession to Sir John Denham, who had been transferred to the English court of exchequer. While the Irish chancellorship was vacant he was a commissioner of the great seal.

He was a Member of Parliament three times for Beaumaris (1597, 1604 and 1614) and for Caernarvonshire in 1601.

In 1620, he resigned his judgeship, and returned to the English bar. His name occurs in his own and in George Croke's ‘Reports’ from Michaelmas 1620 to Michaelmas 1621. On 25 September 1621, he was appointed a judge of the Court of Common Pleas, and on 20 March 1622 was selected as a member of a commission to go to Ireland. He complained to Lionel Cranfield, 1st Earl of Middlesex that the commissioners refused to recognise him as a judge, or entitled to any precedence on the commission, and that he was placed junior on it. While in Ireland, upon the complaint of the general body of suitors, he revised the scale of costs in the Dublin courts. He remained a member of the Irish commission at any rate till November 1623.

On 6 August 1623, he was appointed a member of the Council of Wales, in January of the following year was a member of another Irish commission, and on 17 October 1624 was transferred from the Common Pleas to the Court of King's Bench. As a member of the Star Chamber he appears to have been in favour of leniency, at least in the cases of Baron Morley and Sir Henry Mayne; but in 1627 he was one of the judges who refused to admit Sir John Eliot and his companions to bail (28 November). He was one of the judges who tried Eliot, Denzil Holles and Benjamin Valentine in 1630, and he delivered the judgment of the court.

In 1636, he signed an opinion in favour of ship money, and in 1638 he gave judgment for its legality. He died at his house in Holborn on 9 December 1640, and was buried in Lincoln's Inn Chapel.

== Works ==
Thomas Hearne in his Curious Discourses prints a paper by Jones on the early Britons, read before the Society of Antiquaries in Elizabeth I's reign, and calls him a person of learning in British antiquities. Jones's ‘Reports of Cases from 18 James I to 15 Charles I’ appeared in 1675.

== Family ==
He married in 1587 Margaret, eldest daughter of Griffith ap John Griffith of Kevenamulch, Carnarvonshire and secondly, Catherine, daughter of Thomas Powys of Abingdon, Oxfordshire, widow of Dr. Robert Hovenden. His sons Charles reader at Lincoln's Inn, and William were also MPs.

== Notes ==
Parliament of England
Preceded by Thomas Bulkeley	MP for Beaumaris; 1597–1598	Succeeded by William Maurice
Preceded by William Maurice	MP for Beaumaris; 1604–1614	Succeeded by Sampson Eure
Legal offices
Preceded by John Denham	Lord Chief Justice of Ireland; 1617–1620	Succeeded by Sir George Shurley, or Shirley
