= Sir William Williams, 6th Baronet =

Welsh politician and landowner (c.1668–96)

Sir William Williams Bt

MP for Caernarvonshire
- In office 1689–1696
- Preceded by: Thomas Bulkeley
- Succeeded by: Thomas Bulkeley

Personal details
- Born: 1668
- Died: 23 December 1696 (aged 27–28)
- Spouse: Ellen Bulkeley
- Occupation: Landowner; Politician

Sir William Williams, 6th Baronet (c. 1663– 23 December 1696) of Faenol (Vaynol) was a Welsh politician and landowner elected as MP for Caernarvonshire from 1689 until his death.

== Career ==
Williams was born in around 1663, the son of Sir Griffith Williams (d.c. 1663), 4th Baronet, of Faenol (Vaynol), and his wife Penelope, daughter of Thomas, 1st Viscount Bulkeley. Sir Griffith was one of the Williams baronets, and was succeeded by his son Sir Thomas Williams (d.c. 1673) as 5th Baronet. Sir William succeeded his brother in around 1673.

In 1688, he succeeded Robert, 2nd Viscount Bulkeley as Vice-Admiral of North Wales and, in the following year, he was elected as MP for Caernarvonshire. He married his cousin Ellen Bulkeley, the daughter of Robert, 2nd Viscount Bulkeley.

== Death and legacy ==
Williams died on 23 December 1696 and the Baronetcy became extinct. Ignoring the claims of an impostor, Arthur Owen, who claimed to be a relative, Williams left his Vaynol estate to the descendants of his friend, the late Sir Bourchier Wrey, 4th Baronet.

== Arms ==
Coat of arms of Sir William Williams, 6th Baronet

Notes
The arms of Sir William Williams
Escutcheon
Gules, a chevron ermine between three Saxon heads couped proper.

== Bibliography ==
Sir William Williams, 6th Baronet, History of Parliament Online

Parliament of England
Preceded by Thomas Bulkeley	Member of Parliament for Caernarvonshire; 1689–1696	Succeeded by Thomas Bulkeley
Honorary titles
Preceded by The Viscount Bulkeley	Vice-Admiral of North Wales; 1688–1696	Succeeded by Hugh Nanney
Baronetage of England
Preceded by Thomas Williams	Baronet (of Vaynol) c. 1673–1696	Extinct
