= John Denham (judge) =

English-born judge

Sir John Denham (1559–1639) was an English-born judge who spent part of his career in Ireland. He is chiefly remembered now as one of the "Ship-money judges" who decided the so-called Ship Money case, Rex v. Hampden, a dispute which helped to kindle the English Civil War. He was the father of the poet Sir John Denham. From 1609 he was Chief Baron of the Irish Exchequer; from 1612, Lord Chief Justice of the King's Bench in Ireland, and a member of the Privy Council of Ireland; and from 1615, following the dismissal of Arthur Chichester, he became one of the Lords Justices of Ireland. In 1617 he was recalled to England to be appointed one of the Barons of the Exchequer in England. Sir Francis Bacon held him in high esteem.

He is not to be confused with Sir John Dynham of Boarstall, High Sheriff of Buckinghamshire in 1621–1622, whose will was proved in 1636.

== Background ==
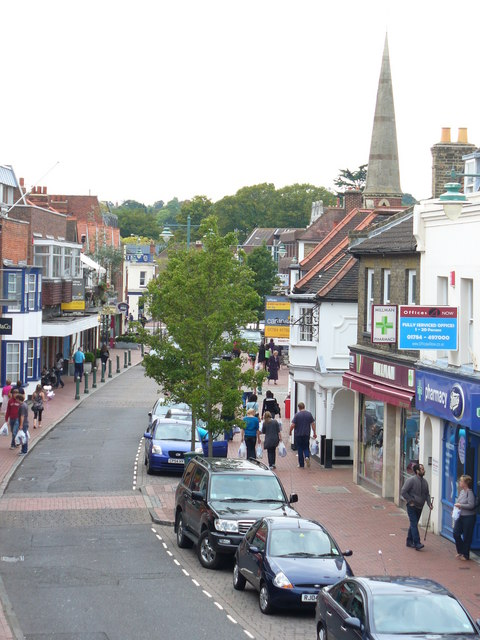
Present day Egham, Surrey, where Denham spent his later years

John Denham was born in 1559, the second of five sons (and ten daughters) of William Denham (died 1583, and buried at Thorpe, Surrey), and his wife Joan (died 1589). His father was a Warden of the Worshipful Company of Goldsmiths in London, in which capacity he requested the patent granted in 1571 of heraldic arms with crest and supporters, on behalf of the Goldsmiths' Mistery; he later lived at Thorpe. John's elder brother was William, and his sisters were Judith, Sarah and another probably named Joan. John (as of Furnivall's Inn) was admitted to Lincoln's Inn in August 1579. He was called to the Bar in 1587 and became a bencher of Lincoln's Inn in 1603.

Having married in 1596 to Cicelie, the widow of a royal Groom of Egham, Surrey, in 1604 he held the site of the manor of Imworth in Egham which became his permanent home. He rebuilt the Manor House, called "The Place, or Palace (by which name the vulgar sort of people call the Manour-House, or chief House of the Town)", also called the Parsonage-House, because Denham held the advowson of Egham. (This building, since demolished, is distinct from the mansion of Great Fosters nearby, being the part-manor of Imworth-Fosters, which was the home of Sir John Doddington.) John Aubrey said of it: "A House it is very convenient, not great, but pretty, and pleasantly, and healthfully situated, in which his son Sir John (though he had better Seats), took most Delight."

In March 1606/7, as Reader in Lincoln's Inn, at his request Thomas Hunloke of Derbyshire and Charles Monk of Buckinghamshire were admitted: Hunloke became his sister Judith's husband. Sarah Denham married Francis Morley, and they were parents of George Morley, afterwards Bishop of Winchester. John became serjeant-at-law in 1609. He was steward of Eton College, and also acted as counsel to the school. His first wife, Cecily, died in April 1612.

== Career in Ireland ==
In 1609 he was knighted and sent to Ireland as Chief Baron of the Irish Exchequer. He made vigorous efforts to bring the procedures of the Irish Court into line with those of its English counterpart. A serious difficulty was that the other Barons were "old and infirm". In 1612 he was appointed Lord Chief Justice of the King's Bench in Ireland, and he was made also a member of the Privy Council of Ireland. He was a leading supporter of the policy of extending the English common law system to the whole of Ireland, and criticised the widespread use of palatine Courts by powerful nobles, which deterred litigants from bringing their cases to the royal courts.

It was during his service in Ireland that Denham made his second marriage, to Ellenor, one of the daughters of Sir Garret Moore, lord baron of Mellifont. Hence it was in Dublin, also, that his son John was born in 1614 or 1615. Following their return to England in 1617, Ellenor died in chilbed at Egham in 1619.

He was regarded by Sir Arthur Chichester, the Lord Deputy of Ireland, as a valuable ally and was sent by him to England in 1613 to defend the proceedings of the Parliament of Ireland from attacks on it by the Roman Catholic members of the House of Commons, who were still a numerous and quite influential party. He fully shared Chichester's hostility to the Roman Catholic faith, and his determination strictly to enforce the Penal Laws despite strong opposition from the Catholic upper and middle classes. Despite his frequent complaints of ill-health he regularly travelled on assize. He was also a Commissioner for the Plantation of Ulster, and after Chichester's dismissal in 1615, he was one of the Lords Justices of Ireland.

He was credited with greatly increasing the Irish revenues, at a time when the Crown was heavily in debt, and in 1617 was praised by Francis Bacon for his hard work and prudence as a judge in Ireland. Even after his return to England, he advised the Crown on Irish affairs, and in 1623 was appointed to the newly created committee of the Privy Council for Irish affairs.

== Denham's Almshouse ==
In 1617 Sir John returned to England to take up office as a Baron of the Exchequer, in the place of Sir James Altham, deceased. He established an almshouse in Egham in 1624. This charitable action may have been a response to the deaths of his wife and infant daughter in 1619 and that of his brother William in 1623. John Aubrey observed that the gateway to the building bore the inscription "Donum Dei, et Deo, 1624" (A Gift of God, and Unto God, 1624). "It was built and endow'd by baron Denham", he wrote. "It is for the Maintenance of five poor old Women of this Parish; (one, if not two of the number, being added upon the birth of his son John)... It is a neat Alms-House built of Brick, and every Woman hath her particular Orchard." The terms of the foundation were set out in Denham's will: "[the women] were to have new Gowns every Christmas, and Stockings and Shoes twice a year of 14 d. the Ell, [and] Cloth for the Gowns 14 Groats the Yard." Denham's charity, having served his intention for some 370 years, was wound up in 1991.

== The case of Ship Money ==
As one of the Barons of the Exchequer, he was among the judges in the celebrated Case of Ship Money, Rex v. John Hampden, which concerned the prerogative of the King to levy the tax on his simple assertion that a need for it existed. When King Charles I in 1636 first consulted the twelve High Court judges on his power to levy ship money, Denham was one of ten of them who advised that it was the King's royal prerogative to determine whether the national good required the imposition of the tax.

By the time the case of John Hampden was heard by the Court of Exchequer in 1637, Denham is known to have been increasingly doubtful about the legality of ship money; indeed it was due to Denham's doubts that the Lord Chief Baron, Sir Humphrey Davenport, decided to remove the case to the Court of Exchequer Chamber, where it would be heard by twelve rather than the usual four judges. When the twelve came to give judgement, Denham was one of the five who voted in favour of Hampden. Although he was then so ill "of my old disease" (probably the "severe ague" which had afflicted him while on assize the previous year), that he could not leave home, he sent in a short opinion that "the King's Majesty..... can neither take any lands or goods of any of his subjects but only upon a judgment on record."

Had he lived longer his opinion would very likely have saved him from being impeached, as most of his surviving colleagues were; in the event, he died at his home at Egham, Surrey, the following year.

== Family ==
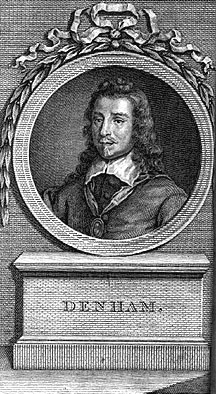
Sir John Denham, poet, the judge's son

Sir John Denham the judge married first, on 30 September 1596, Cicely, née Farr, a woman already twice widowed, by whom he had no children. She was, first, the second wife of Anthony Bond of Egham (died 1576), Writer of the Court Letter of London, and secondly of Richard Kellefet of Egham (died 1595), 'Chief Groome of Her [Majesties] Removing Gardrobe of Beddes, and Yeoman also of Her Standing Gardrobe of Richmount, Sonne of George Kellefet and Margaret his Wife, whoe maryed Cycelye widow of Anthony Bonde of Rusham Gentleman.' Cicely died in April 1612.

He married secondly Eleanor Moore, daughter of Garret Moore, 1st Viscount Moore, by his wife Mary, daughter of Sir Henry Colley. He and Eleanor had one surviving son:

- (Sir) John Denham (1615–1669), the celebrated royalist poet (see portrait). The younger John's passion for gambling is said to have caused his father a good deal of worry in his last years: he lost several thousand pounds on gaming. In 1634 the poet married Ann Cotton, and had children of his own.

Eleanor Denham died in childbirth in 1619.

== Monuments ==
Sir John Denham (died 1639) and both his wives were buried at St. John's Church, Egham. Although the present St John's Church is a much later structure, their monuments survive. They form a pair of sculpted wall monuments, which were formerly set in the chancel of the old church.

The wives' monument is a composite tablet of coloured marbles or alabaster with an entablature supported by black columns and strapwork panelling and surmounted by a curved pediment. The structure encloses a central oval panel showing busts of the two wives in relief, the nearer (overlain) turning towards the viewer and holding in her lap a displayed boy child partly enclosed by drapery. A panel below is inscribed: "Here lye buried the Bodies of Lady Cecile Denham first wife of Sir John Denham Knight and formerly the wife of Richard Kellefet Esquire deceased and of Lady Ellenor Denham second wife of the sayd Sr John Denham and one of the daughters of Sir Garret Moore Knight Lord Barrone of Mellefont in the Kingdome of Ireland whom he maried duringe his Service in Ireland in the Place of Chief Justice ther and by who[m] he had issue a Sonne now livinge and a Daughter interred here with her of whom shee died in Childbed." At the top is a heraldic escutcheon now showing:

- Gules, 3 lozenges ermine, (Denham), impaling Azure, on a chief indented or, 3 mullets pierced gules (for Moore), with the Moore crest of a Moor's head, erased.
- Gules, a fesse indented ermine, impaling Sable, a fesse indented, with three molets on the fesse. (The same escutcheon as read for V.C.H. 1911).

Sir John's monument consists of a finely-sculpted alabaster figure set in front of a tall and arched, dark gilt-inscribed panel, enclosed between two black marble pillars with gilded Corinthian capitals. The carving, in full relief (i.e., in the round), shows the half-naked figure of Sir John in his winding sheet arising out of his open coffin and gazing upwards. Above each pillar is a pedestal inscribed "Surge a somnis" (Arise from slumbers) in gilded lettering, on which stand the figures of two angels, one with a scythe and trumpet and one with book and trumpet. Upon the coffin is written "Praeterita sperno" (I turn away from what is past). "A little lower lie his scarlet robes and square cap: under these are several skeletons, among which are his own figure, and his lady's, as rising; above them written "Ex ossibus armati"." (From among the bones, prepared). Below the cornice is written "Sic transit gloria mundi" (Thus the glory of the world passes away), and on the table within the arch is written: "Futura spero ut a peccatis in vita, sic a morte post vitam ut secunde reddat primam, et ultimam Christo resurrectionem ex omni parte perfectam" (I hope in what is to come, as from sinfulness to life, so also from death after life, that secondly it may restore the first, the final and in every way complete resurrection in Christ). About the outer moulding of the high arch is written "Via, vita et resurrectio mea est per Jesum Christum in aeternam Beatitudinem cum sanctis" (My Way, my Life and my Resurrection is, through Jesus Christ, in eternal Blessedness with the saints); around the inner verge the text is: "Quamdiu, Domine Jesu, quamdiu, veni O Domine, Jesu, veni" (How long, Lord Jesu, how long, Come, O Lord Jesu, come). This is not a neo-Catholic representation of Judgement but a contemplation in the Metaphysical vein. Above the arched panel, the frame rises to an apex beneath which is set a small armorial escutcheon of Denham (gules, 3 lozenges ermine) impaling Moore: above the apex is a more elaborate escutcheon with the arms and crest of Denham alone.

Possibly, Sir John's monument is no longer complete. Whereas (even in 1718) there was no biographical data, Aubrey copied the following record from the parish register: "The Right Worshipfull Sr John Denham, Knight, and one of his Ma[jes]ties Barons of the Exchequer, died the 6 of January, about 4 of the Clock in the morning in his own Howse in Egham, and was buried the 10th of January, at 9 of the Clock at Night, 1638." Edmund Borlase recorded that, over the choir door of Christ Church Cathedral, Dublin, was the inscription: "The Honourable Sir John Denham, Knight, Lord Chief Justice of His Majesties Chief Place, and one of the Lords Justices in this Kingdom in the Year 1616." Borlase also referred to the following inscription in a chapel window at Lincoln's Inn, noted by William Dugdale: "Johannes Denham Miles, unus Baronum Curiae Scaccarii in Anglia, et quondam Capitalis Baro Scaccarii in Hibernia, et unus Dominorum Justiciariorum in Hibernia."

His last direct descendant was his great-granddaughter Mary, Countess of Derby, who died in 1752.

Legal offices
Preceded by Sir Humphrey Winch	Lord Chief Justice of Ireland; 1612–1617	Succeeded by Sir William Jones
