= Frederick Paget =

British politician (1807-1866)

Colonel Frederick Paget

Member of Parliament for Beaumaris
- In office 1832–1847
- Preceded by: Sir Richard Williams-Bulkeley, Bt
- Succeeded by: Lord George Paget

Personal details
- Born: 9 March 1807
- Died: 4 January 1866 (aged 58)
- Party: Whig
- Spouse: Maria Grenfell (m. 1856)
- Parent: Berkeley Paget (father)
- Relatives: Henry Paget (uncle); Arthur Paget (uncle); Edward Paget (uncle); Charles Paget (uncle); William Paget (uncle); Henry Paget (grandfather); William Bucknall (grandfather)
- Military career
- Allegiance: United Kingdom
- Rank: Colonel
- Unit: Coldstream Guards

Colonel Frederick Paget (9 March 1807 – 4 January 1866) was a British soldier and Whig politician.

== Background ==
Paget was the son of the Honourable Berkeley Paget, sixth son of Henry Paget, 1st Earl of Uxbridge. His mother was Sophia, daughter of the Hon. William Bucknall. He was the nephew of Henry Paget, 1st Marquess of Anglesey, Sir Arthur Paget, Sir Edward Paget and Sir Charles Paget.

== Military and political career ==
Paget served in the Coldstream Guards and achieved the rank of captain. In 1832 he was returned to parliament for Beaumaris, a seat he held until 1847 when he was succeeded by his cousin Lord George Paget.

== Family ==
Paget married Maria Georgiana, daughter of Charles Grenfell, in 1856. He died in January 1866, aged 58. His wife survived him by over 30 years and died in September 1900.

Parliament of the United Kingdom
Preceded by Sir Richard Williams-Bulkeley, Bt	Member of Parliament for Beaumaris; 1832–1847	Succeeded by Lord George Paget
Court offices
Preceded by Charles Arbuthnot	Page of Honour; 1817–1823	Succeeded by William Burton
