= Morgan Lloyd (politician) =

Welsh Liberal MP (1822-1893)

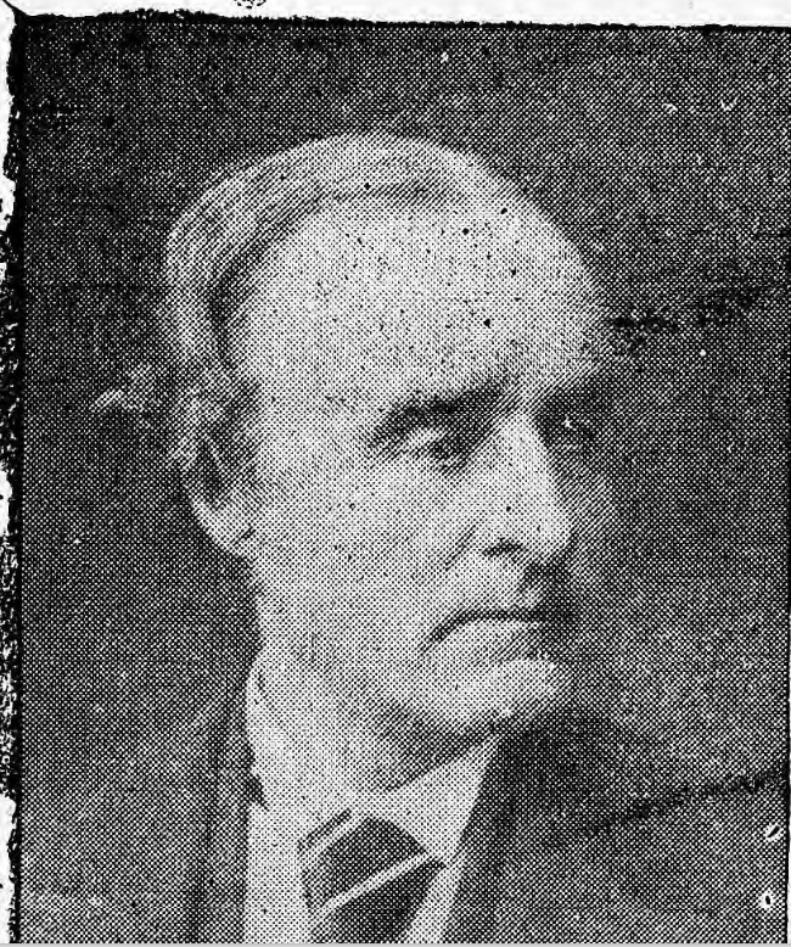

Member of Parliament for Beaumaris
- In office 1874–1885

Personal details
- Born: 1822
- Died: 5 September 1893 (aged 70–71)
- Party: Liberal
- Other political affiliations: Liberal Unionist

Morgan Lloyd (1822 - 5 September 1893) was a Welsh Liberal politician who sat in the House of Commons from 1874 to 1885.

== Biography ==
Lloyd was the son of Morris Lloyd of Cefngellgwm, Trawsfynydd, Merionethshire. He was educated at the University of Edinburgh and was called to the bar at Middle Temple in 1847. He became a QC in February 1873 and became a bencher of his Inn in 1875. He was JP for Merioneth.

At the 1868 general election Lloyd stood unsuccessfully at Anglesey. In 1874 he was elected Member of Parliament for Beaumaris. He held the seat until 1885 when it was replaced under the Redistribution of Seats Act 1885.

He later stood as the Liberal Unionist candidate for Anglesey.

== Family life ==
Lloyd married firstly Mary Fleeming (daughter of Admiral Elphinstone Fleeming) in 1848. He married secondly in 1879 Priscilla Willy Lewes (daughter of James Lewis of Cwnhyar, Cardiganshire).

Lloyd died at the age of 71.

Parliament of the United Kingdom
Preceded by Hon. William Owen Stanley	Member of Parliament for Beaumaris; 1874 – 1885	abolished
