= William Maurice (politician) =

Welsh politician

Sir William Maurice (April 1552 – 5 August 1622) was a Welsh politician who sat in the House of Commons at various times between 1593 and 1611.

Maurice was the son of Morys ap Ellis ap Morys, and grandson of Ellis ap Morris of Clennenau, his brother was captain Ellis Maurice fought for Queen Elizabeth I in Ireland. He was one of the Council of the Marches of Wales. He was High Sheriff of Caernarvonshire in 1582 and High Sheriff of Merionethshire in 1591. In 1593, he was elected Member of Parliament for Carnarvonshire. He was High Sheriff of Carnarvonshire again in 1596. In 1597 he was re-elected MP for Carnarvonshire. In 1601 he was elected MP for Beaumaris. He was a personal friend of James I, and induced him to assume the title of King of Great Britain. He was knighted at Whitehall on 23 July 1603. In 1604 he was elected MP for Carnarvonshire again. He was High Sheriff of Merionethshire again in 1606. He was of Clennenau and was probably constable of Harlech Castle.

Maurice died at the age of 70 on the fifth of August in 1622 and was buried at St. Beuno's Church, Penmorfa.

Maurice first married Margaret Lacon only daughter of John Wyn Lacon of Elanddyn and Porkington. She died in 1572 and was buried at Selattyn on 18 February 1572. His second marriage was to Ellen Wis, widow of John Wis of Chwaen and daughter of Hugh ap Llewelyn. His third wife, whom he married between 6 June 1604 and 8 June 1605 was Jane Johnes widow of Sir Thomas Johnes of Abfrmarles and daughter of Rowland Puleston of Carnarvon.

Maurice employed a tailor in Shrewsbury, John Langley. In 1594 he ordered clothing for his wife and daughter, including a farthingale and farthingale sleeves.

Parliament of England
Preceded by Hugh Gwyn Bodvel	Member of Parliament for Carnarvonshire; 1593–1597	Succeeded by William Griffith
Preceded by William Jones	Member of Parliament for Beaumaris; 1601	Succeeded by William Jones
Preceded by William Jones	Member of Parliament for Carnarvonshire; 1604–1611	Succeeded by Richard Wynn
