= James Bulkeley, 6th Viscount Bulkeley =

British Member of Parliament (1717–1752)

James Bulkeley, 6th Viscount Bulkeley (17 February 1716/17 – 23 April 1752) of Baron Hill, Anglesey, was a Welsh landowner and Tory politician who sat in the House of Commons from 1739 to 1752.

== Early life ==
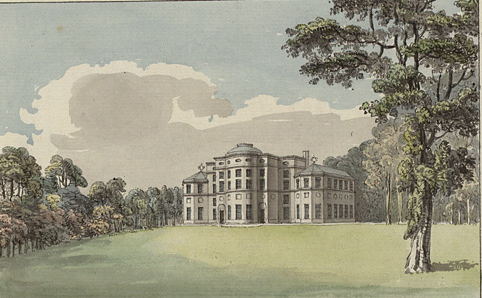
Baron Hill, Anglesey, the seat of the Bulkeley family, in 1776. Now a ruin.

Bulkeley was the second son of Richard Bulkeley, 4th Viscount Bulkeley, and his wife Bridget Bertie, daughter of James Bertie, 1st Earl of Abingdon. He was educated at Westminster School in 1725 and matriculated at Oriel College, Oxford on 30 April 1735.

He succeeded to the Irish peerage as Viscount Bulkeley on the death of his childless elder brother, Richard, in 1738. He also inherited Baron Hill and became Chamberlain of North Wales and Constable of Beaumaris castle from 1739 until his death.

== Career and politics ==
Bulkeley was returned unopposed as Tory Member of Parliament for Beaumaris at a by-election on 20 April 1739, following the death of his brother. He was returned unopposed for Beaumaris in 1741 and 1747.

Bulkeley was involved with the Welsh Jacobites under Sir Watkin Williams-Wynn and was apparently willing to lead an uprising in Wales against George II. However, this never happened because of a lack of French military support for The Young Pretender during the Invasion of England.

== Family and legacy ==
Bulkeley married Emma Rowlands, daughter of Thomas Rowlands of Caerau, Anglesey, and Nant, Caernarfonshire on 5 August 1749. Together they had 3 children, including one posthumous son:

- Bridget (1749 - 13 July 1766)
- Eleanor-Maria (born 1750), died an infant
- Thomas (1752–1822), who succeeded as seventh viscount, married Elizabeth Warren, only daughter and heir of Sir George Warren in 1777, without issue

Parliament of Great Britain
Preceded by Richard Bulkeley	Member of Parliament for Beaumaris; 1739–1752	Succeeded by John Owen
Peerage of Ireland
Preceded by Richard Bulkeley	Viscount Bulkeley; 1738–1752	Succeeded by Thomas Bulkeley
