= Richard Vaughan (died 1734) =

Tory Welsh politician

Member of Parliament for Merioneth
- In office 1701–1734
- Preceded by: Hugh Nanney
- Succeeded by: William Vaughan

High Sheriff of Carnarvonshire
- In office 1699–1700

High Sheriff of Merionethshire
- In office 1697–1698

Personal details
- Born: c. 1665
- Died: 28 March 1734 (aged 68–69)
- Party: Tory
- Spouse: Margaret Lloyd (m. 1701)
- Children: 2+, including William and Evan

Richard Vaughan (c. 1665–1734) was a Tory Welsh politician who sat in the House of Commons for 33 years from 1701 to 1734.

== Biography ==
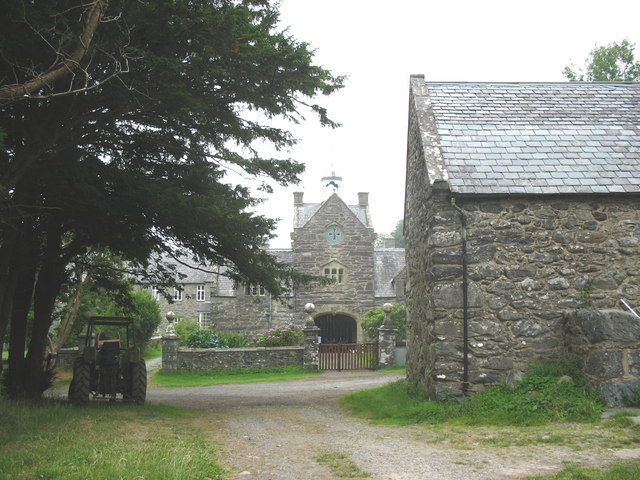
Corsygedol

Vaughan was the son of William Vaughan of Corsygedol and his wife Anne Nanney, daughter of Griffith Nanney of Nannau Hall, Llanfachreth, Merioneth. He entered Lincoln's Inn in 1686. In 1697 he inherited the estate at Corsygedol on the death of his brother. He was High Sheriff of Merionethshire in 1697–8 and High Sheriff of Carnarvonshire in 1699–1700. He married Margaret Lloyd, daughter of Sir Evan Lloyd of Bodidris, Denbighshire on 10 February 1701.

Vaughan was elected Member of Parliament for Merioneth In a by election on 29 April 1701 on the death of Hugh Nanney. He was a lifelong Tory, and did not vote in any of the recorded divisions after 1715. He was Constable of Harlech Castle from 1704 to 1716.

Vaughan appears to have dedicated much of his later life to supervising extensive improvements to his house and estate. He died 28 March 1734 and was buried at Llandwye, Merioneth. His eldest son William Vaughan succeeded him in the estate and constituency. His second son Evan was also later MP for Merioneth.

Parliament of Great Britain
Preceded by Hugh Nanney	Member of Parliament for Merioneth; 1701–1734	Succeeded by William Vaughan
