= Roger Gale (antiquary) =

17th and 18th-century English Member of Parliament and antiquarian

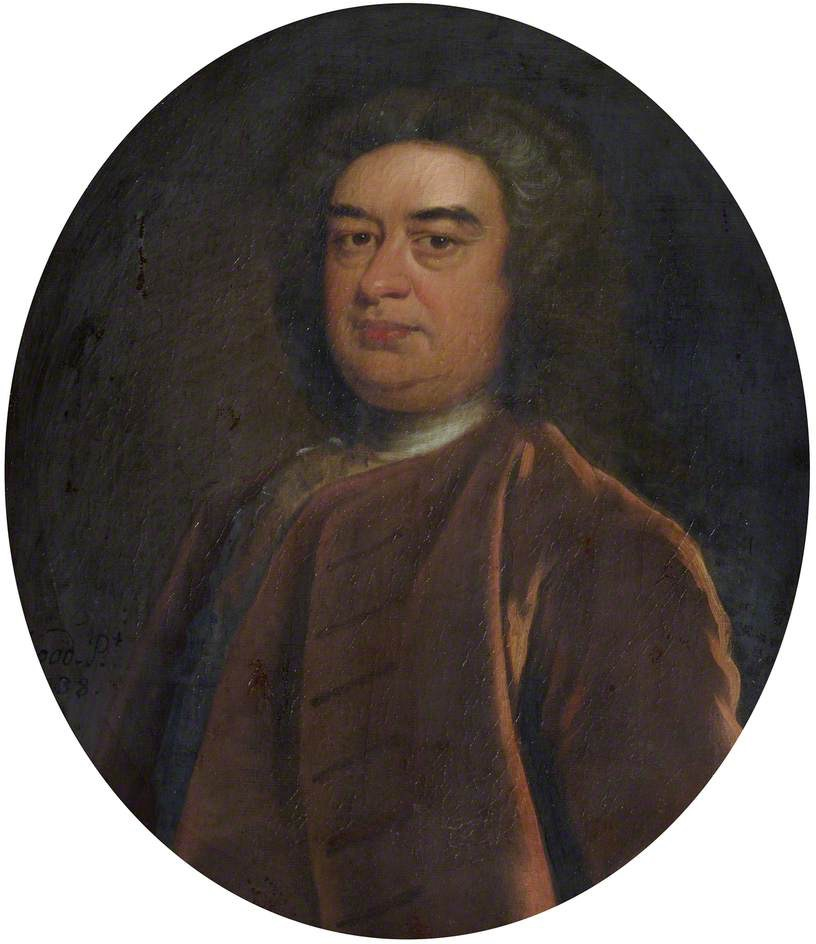

Member of Parliament for Northallerton
- In office December 1705 – 1713
- Preceded by: William Hustler
- Succeeded by: Leonard Smelt
- Preceded by: Robert Dormer
- Succeeded by: Henry Peirse

Personal details
- Born: 27 September 1672 Impington, Cambridgeshire, England
- Died: 25 June 1744 (aged 71) Scruton, Yorkshire, England
- Resting place: Scruton, Yorkshire, England
- Party: Whig
- Spouse: Henrietta Roper
- Children: Roger Henry Gale
- Education: Trinity College, Cambridge University
- Occupation: writer, antiquary

Roger Gale (27 September 1672 – 25 June 1744) was an English scholar and antiquary as well as a Whig politician who sat in the English and British House of Commons from 1705 to 1713. His father was an ecclesiastic and professor at Cambridge, which the younger Gale also attended. After his graduation, Gale briefly served as a diplomat in France, as well as holding a position as a reader at Oxford University's Bodleian Library. On his father's death in 1702, Gale retired to his family estate, but was elected to Parliament in 1705, where he served until 1713. He then continued in public service until 1735, when he once more retired to his estates.

Besides his governmental career, Gale was a member of the Society of Antiquaries and the Royal Society, where he served as treasurer. Gale was known as a collector of manuscripts and other antiquarian items, writing a few published works on those subjects. He donated his manuscript collection to his alma mater in 1738, and died in 1744. Although contemporaries felt he was one of the foremost scholars of his age, later historians have been less convinced, contrasting his learning unfavourably with his father's.

== Early life ==
Roger Gale was the eldest son of Thomas Gale and Barbara Pepys. His father was Dean of York as well as a professor of Greek at Cambridge University, while his mother was a cousin of the diarist Samuel Pepys. Roger was born on 27 September 1672 at Impington, Cambridgeshire. Thomas and Barbara had a younger son, Samuel Gale, who also became an antiquary, and a daughter, Elizabeth, who became William Stukeley's second wife.

Gale was educated at St Paul's School in London, where his father was in charge from 1672 to 1697. He then went on to attend Trinity College, Cambridge, starting in 1691, earning his Bachelor of Arts in 1695 and a Master of Arts in 1698. He then became a reader at the Bodleian Library at Oxford University on 6 March 1699. Soon after this, probably in the later part of 1699, he went with Charles Montagu, then the Earl of Manchester, on a diplomatic mission to France. His father died in 1702, and Gale retired to his newly inherited estates at Scruton, North Yorkshire.

== Public service ==
Gale was returned in a contest as Member of Parliament (MP) for Northallerton in a by-election on 3 December 1705 but was inactive in Parliament until 1708 when he was a teller for a bill to encourage trade with America, and carried a bill to allow two Russian built ships to trade with Russia. At the 1708 British general election, he was returned unopposed as a Whig MP for Northallerton. He was a teller for the Whigs in an election dispute in December 1708. In 1709 he supported the naturalization of the Palatines and in March 1710 he reported on and carried up a bill for regulating servants’ wages. Later in 1710, he voted for the impeachment of Dr Sacheverell. He was returned again in a contest for Northallerton at the 1710 British general election. He voted against the French commerce bill, and was classed as a Whig. He did not stand at the 1713 British general election being "resolved for the future to decline that troublesome post". After leaving Parliament, he was appointed to a commission dealing with stamp duties from 1714 to 1715, and in 1715 was appointed a commissioner of excise. He remained in that position until 1735, when Robert Walpole had him removed to free the post for one of Walpole's friends.

Gale also served as the first vice-president of the Society of Antiquaries, which was established in 1707. He was elected a Fellow of the Royal Society on 28 March 1717 and was the treasurer of the Royal Society for a number of years. In 1736 he returned to his estates and retired from public life.

== Antiquary and writer ==
Gale inherited his father's library of manuscripts and books, which he eventually donated to his alma mater, Trinity College, in 1738. Included in Gale's donation was one of only two complete manuscripts of the Liber Eliensis, now known as Trinity College MS O.2.1. Gale also collected coins, and donated his collection to Cambridge University.

In 1697 Gale translated Louis Jobert's La science des medailles into English, with the title of The Knowledge of Medals. This was designed as an instruction to the beginning coin collector, and also contained information to protect the new collector from fraud. Gale then, in 1709, published his father's work on the Antonine Itinerary, which Gale supplemented with his own notes and commentary. His last major published work was as the editor of a 12th-century manuscript register of the Honour of Richmond that was contained in the Cotton library. He also contributed a number of essays on antiquarian topics to the Philosophical Transactions journal put out by the Royal Society.

Gale's letters survive, and some were first published in the third volume of John Nichols's Bibliotheca Topographica Britannica in 1790. Later more appeared in Nichols' Literary Anecdotes, and then finally his complete letters were published in three volumes by the Surtees Society along with letters from his brother Samuel and brother-in-law William Stukeley. Nichols in 1781 declared that Gale was "one of the most learned men of his age", but later scholars have been less full of praise. D. C. Douglas, writing in the 1950s, contrasted Gale with his father, and felt that the younger Gale was given a greater reputation than he deserved. Notwithstanding Douglas' opinion, Gale's work did much to preserve important historical information, as he was a member of the new style of antiquary, who instead of working just with manuscripts, turned to the topography and other relics in the countryside. This group of antiquaries did much to record information that has since disappeared.

== Death and family ==
Gale married Henrietta Roper, the daughter of Henry Roper of Cowling, Kent. She died in 1720. They had one son, Roger Henry Gale, who was born in 1710. Gale himself died on 25 June 1744 at his estates in Scruton, and was buried near the church there. There is no monument in the churchyard, as he stipulated in his will that he be buried in such a manner that no one would know exactly where he was buried. There are portraits of Gale at Trinity College, and St Paul's School.

== Citations ==
Parliament of England
| Preceded by Sir William Hustler; Robert Dormer | Member of Parliament for Northallerton; 1705–1713; With: Sir William Hustler and Robert Raikes | Succeeded by Leonard Smelt; Henry Peirse |
