= Robert Dormer (1650–1726) =

English barrister, judge and politician

Robert Dormer (1650–1726), of Lee Grange, Buckinghamshire and Lincoln's Inn Fields, was an English barrister, judge of the court of common pleas from 1706, and politician.

He was a Member (MP) of the Parliament of England for Aylesbury from 22 February 1699 to 1700, for Buckinghamshire in the periods December 1701 – 1702 and 1705 – 11 February 1706 and for Northallerton on 23 November 1702 – 1705.

Parliament of England
Preceded by Sir Thomas Lee, 2nd Bt; James Herbert	Member of Parliament for Aylesbury; 1699–1701; With: James Herbert	Succeeded by James Herbert; Sir Thomas Lee, 2nd Bt
Preceded by The Viscount Newhaven; Goodwin Wharton	Member of Parliament for Buckinghamshire; 1701–1702; With: Goodwin Wharton	Succeeded by The Viscount Newhaven; Goodwin Wharton
Preceded by Ralph Milbancke; Sir William Hustler	Member of Parliament for Northallerton; 1701 – February 1702; With: Sir William Hustler	Succeeded by Daniel Lascelles; Sir William Hustler
Preceded by John Aislabie; Sir William Hustler	Member of Parliament for Northallerton; November 1702 – December 1705; With: John Aislabie to May 1705; Sir William Hustler from May 1705	Succeeded by Sir William Hustler; Roger Gale
