= John Child (MP) =

English politician

John Child (c. 1677 – 14 February 1703), of the Middle Temple, London, was an English politician.

He was a member (MP) of the parliament of England for Devizes in the period 14 November 1702 – 14 February 1703.
