= William Bulkeley (Welsh politician) =

Welsh politician (1500–1576)

William Bulkeley (c. 1500 – 1575 or 1576), of Beaumaris, Anglesey, was a Welsh politician.

He was born before 1505, the son of Edmund Bulkeley of Conway, North Wales.

He became a well-to-do merchant based in Beaumaris, Anglesey, where he served as bailiff in 1526, 1536 and 1562. He was coroner in 1564. He was elected a member (MP) of the parliament of England for Beaumaris in November 1554 and 1571.

He married twice; firstly Jane, daughter of Nicholas Elcock, with whom he had two sons and two daughters and secondly Margaret Thickness of Beaumaris.
