= Daniel Lascelles (1655–1734) =

English landowner and politician

Daniel Lascelles (6 November 1655 – 5 September 1734), English landowner and politician of Stank and Northallerton, North Riding, Yorkshire, was elected to the House of Commons as Member of Parliament for Northallerton at a by-election on 3 February 1702. He did not stand for election again. He also served as High Sheriff of Yorkshire in 1718–19.

Lascelles was the son of Francis Lascelles (1612–1667) of Stank Hall, Kirby Sigston, Yorkshire and his wife Frances, daughter of Sir William St Quintin (1579–1649), Baronet of Harpham Yorkshire. Francis Lascelles was a dissenter, a colonel in Parliament's army, and a member of the "High Court of Justice" which tried Charles I for treason. He was MP for the North Riding in 1653. After the Stuart Restoration he was fined, and debarred from public employment. Francis's trade connections extended to Ireland and Barbados.

Daniel Lascelles married twice.

By his first wife Margaret Metcalfe (died 1690) daughter and heiress of William Metcalfe of Northallerton, his nine children included:

- George Lascelles (1681–1729) a Barbados merchant, who died at his home in Fenchurch Street, London, on 12 February 1729.
- Henry Lascelles (1690–1753)

By his second wife Mary Lascelles (1662–1734): daughter of kinsman Edward Lascelles, merchant of Barbados and Stoke Newington London:

- Edward Lascelles (1702–1747), father of Edward Lascelles, 1st Earl of Harewood
- Francis Lascelles, died young

Parliament of England
Preceded by Robert Dormer; Sir William Hustler	Member of Parliament for Northallerton; February–July 1702; With: Sir William Hustler	Succeeded by Sir William Hustler; John Aislabie
