= William Hustler =

English draper and Whig politician

Sir William Hustler (c. 1658–1730), of Acklam, Yorkshire, and Little Hatfield, Holderness, Yorkshire was an English draper and Whig politician who sat in the English and British House of Commons between 1695 and 1710. He was a member of the Society for Promoting Christian Knowledge and was great patron of charity schools.

== Early life ==
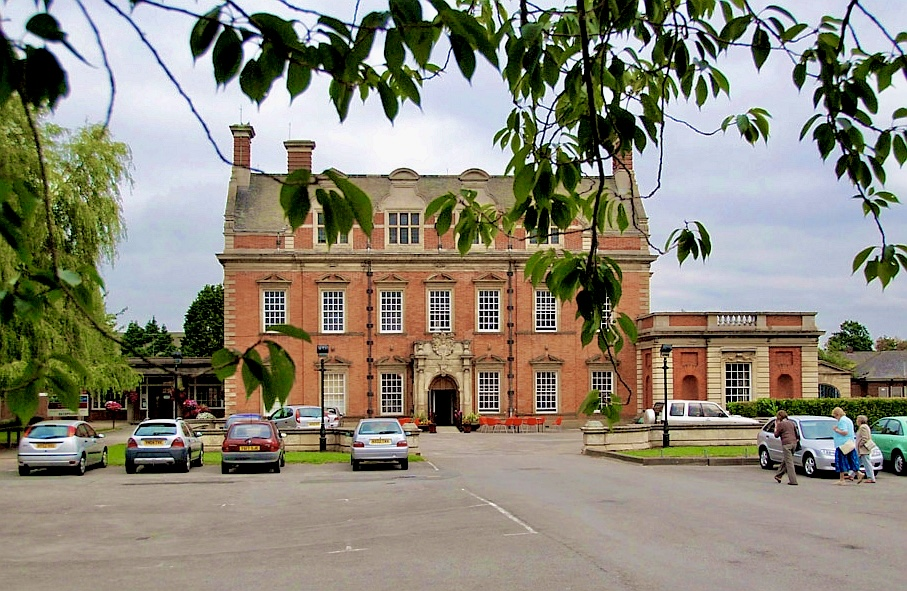
Acklam Hall

Hustler was the eldest son of William Hustler of Acklam and his wife Grace Savile, daughter of Sir John Savile of Lupset, near Wakefield, Yorkshire. He was knighted on 14 May 1673 and succeeded his father in 1678. On 8 July 1680, he married Lady Anne Wentworth, widow of Sir Matthew Wentworth of Bretton, Yorkshire, and daughter of William Osbaldeston of Hunmanby, Yorkshire. He built Acklam Hall in Cleveland in the early 1680s

== Career ==
Hustler was returned unopposed as Member of Parliament for Northallerton at the 1695 English general election on the interest of the Whig Sir William Robinson, 1st Baronet. He served alongside Robinson as a Captain in the North York Horse Militia, commanding the Cleveland Troop. He signed the Association, but was absent from the division on the attainder of Sir John Fenwick. He managed a bill in April 1698 to make it easier to return juries to serve at the assizes and throughout his career managed many bills through the House, often private bills. At the 1698 English general election he was again returned unopposed and was listed as a member of the Country party and later as a supporter of the Whig Junto. He was returned unopposed in the first general election 1701, and during the year became vice president of the newly founded Society for the Propagation of the Gospel in Foreign Parts. At the second general election of 1701, he was again returned unopposed as a Whig for Northallerton and acted frequently as a teller.

At the 1702 English general election, Hustler was returned as MP for both Northallerton and Ripon. He chose to sit for Ripon, probably as part of an electoral agreement on behalf of John Aislabie with whom he exchanged places. He was returned unopposed again for Northallerton at the 1705 English general election and voted for the Court candidate as Speaker on 25 October 1705. At the 1708 British general election, he was returned unopposed as Whig MP for Northallerton once more. He supported the naturalization of the Palatines in 1709 and voted for the impeachment of Henry Sacheverell in 1710. He was defeated at the 1710 British general election, when he came bottom of the poll. He did not stand for Parliament again. As a member of Society for the Promotion of Christian Knowledge he was busy establishing charity schools in Wakefield.

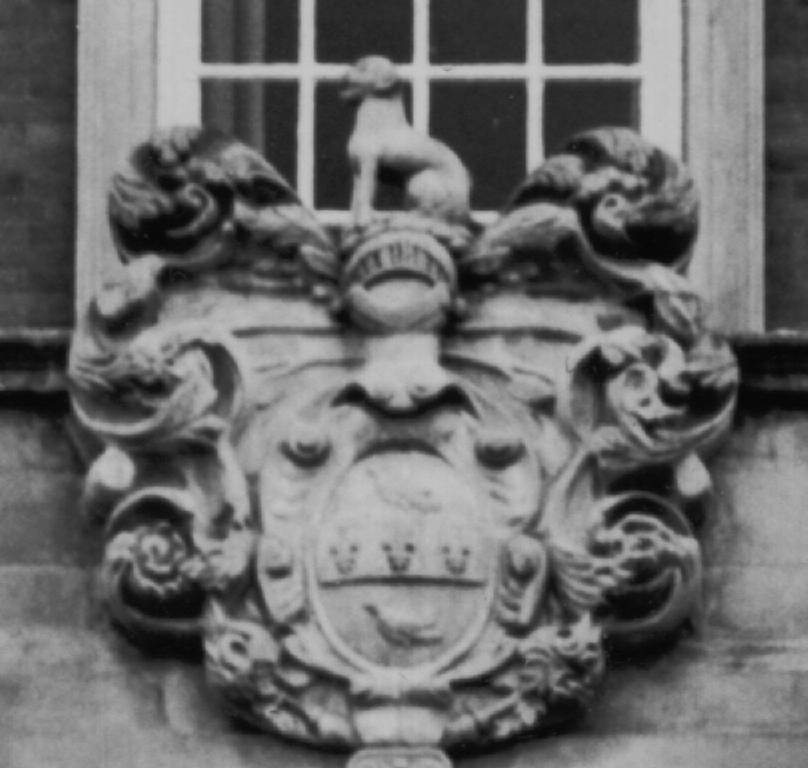
Stonework detail : Hustler Coat of Arms above the Front Door of Ackham Hall

== Death and legacy ==
Hustler died at Acklam on 20 August 1730. He had three sons of whom one predeceased him, and four daughters. He settled his estates in tail on his sons Robert and James with remainder to his daughters. Acklam Hall is now a weddings and corporate events centre.

Parliament of England
Preceded by Sir William Robinson, Bt; Thomas Lascelles	Member of Parliament for Northallerton; 1695–1702; With: Thomas Lascelles 1695–1697; Ralph Milbancke 1697–1701; Robert Dormer 1701 – February 1702; Daniel Lascelles February – 1702 July 1702; John Aislabie from July 1702	Succeeded by John Aislabie; Robert Dormer
Preceded by John Aislabie; John Sharp	Member of Parliament for Ripon; 1702–1705; With: John Sharp	Succeeded by John Sharp; John Aislabie
Preceded by John Aislabie; Robert Dormer	Member of Parliament for Northallerton; 1705–1707; With: Robert Dormer; Roger Gale	Succeeded by Parliament of Great Britain
Parliament of Great Britain
Preceded by Parliament of England	Member of Parliament for Northallerton; 1707–1710; With: Roger Gale	Succeeded by Roger Gale; Robert Raikes
