= Richard Bulkeley, 4th Viscount Bulkeley =

Welsh politician and peer

Richard Bulkeley, 4th Viscount Bulkeley (19 September 1682 – 4 June 1724), of Baron Hill, Anglesey, was a Welsh Tory politician who sat in the House of Commons between 1704 and 1724. He was extremely hot-tempered and was involved in several personal and family disputes with local Whig leaders.

== Early life ==
Bulkeley was the eldest son of Richard Bulkeley, 3rd Viscount Bulkeley and his wife Mary Egerton, daughter of Sir Philip Egerton of Oulton, Cheshire. He was admitted at Christ's College, Cambridge in 1698 and was awarded MA in 1700. He married Bridget Bertie, daughter of James Bertie, 1st Earl of Abingdon, in 1703 He succeeded as Viscount Bulkeley on his father's death in 1704.

== Career ==
Bulkeley held office as Constable of Beaumaris Castle from 1702 to 1716. He was returned as Member of Parliament for Anglesey, following his father's death at a by-election on 30 November 1704 and was returned at the 1705 English general election. He voted against the Court candidate for Speaker on 25 October 1705. In 1706 he was appointed Custos Rotulorum of Anglesey and held the post until 1715. He was known for arrogance and violent tempers, and by 1708 he and his family were involved in various disputes with the local Whig leaders. A leading Whig, Owen Hughes, had the lease of a ferry under Bulkeley's control and on renewal in 1706, Bulkeley, with the support of the Treasury, awarded it to rival operators. Hughes retaliated by complaining that Bulkeley neglected the maintenance of Beaumaris Castle, for which he received a mild reprimand from the Treasury. Bulkeley had a further quarrel with Serjeant John Hooke, a long-standing enemy, concerning the council, which Bulkeley controlled.

There was a contest for Anglesey at the 1708 British general election but Bulkeley defeated his Whig opponent Owen Meyrick. The bitter conflict between Bulkeley and the Whigs continued through the Parliament. Bulkeley was an inactive member but did vote against the impeachment of Dr Sacheverell in 1710. At the 1710 British general election Bulkeley was returned unopposed as MP for Anglesey. Under the Harley administration, he was listed as one of the ‘worthy patriots’ who exposed the mismanagements of the previous ministry, and as one of the ‘Tory patriots’ who opposed the continuance of the war. He was also a member of the October Club and the Loyal Brotherhood. He voted for the French commerce bill on 18 June 1713, and was subsequently rewarded with the office of constable of Caernarvon Castle. By this time he was suspected of being a Jacobite and various of his papers in around 1713 and 1714 attested to Jacobite sympathies. He was returned again as MP for Anglesey at the 1713 British general election, but lost his seat at the 1715 British general election. He lost all his public offices within two years of the Hanoverian succession.

Bulkeley was in receipt of Jacobite correspondence at the time of the 1715 rebellion and subsequently, his servants were informed against for drinking the Pretender's health. In 1721, he and his friend Watkin Williams-Wynn burnt pictures of the King and his family. With the assistance of Williams-Wynn, he was returned again as MP for Anglesey at the 1722 British general election.

== Later life and legacy ==
Bulkeley died at Bath, on 4 June 1724. He and his wife had eight children:

- Richard (1707–1738), who succeeded as fifth viscount, married Jane, daughter of Lewis Owen of Peniarth, Merionethshire, without issue
- James (1717–1752), who succeeded as sixth viscount, married Emma, daughter of Thomas Rowlands of Caerau, Anglesey, and Nant, Caernarfonshire, with issue
- Bridget, died unmarried
- Eleanor, married George Harvey of Teddington, Oxford
- Anne, married William Bertie, brother of Willoughby, 3rd Earl of Abingdon and grandson of James, 1st Earl of Abingdon
- Elizabeth, married William Price of Bulace
- Lumley
- Sarah

Parliament of England
Preceded by The Viscount Bulkeley	Member of Parliament for Anglesey; 1704–1707	Parliament dissolved
Parliament of Great Britain
New parliament	Member of Parliament for Anglesey; 1707–1715	Succeeded by Owen Meyrick
Preceded by Owen Meyrick	Member of Parliament for Anglesey; 1722–1724	Succeeded by Hugh Williams
Honorary titles
Preceded by The Viscount Bulkeley	Custos Rotulorum of Anglesey; 1706–1715	Succeeded by Owen Meyrick
Peerage of Ireland
Preceded by Richard Bulkeley	Viscount Bulkeley; 1704–1724	Succeeded by Richard Bulkeley
