= Thomas Bulkeley (died 1708) =

Welsh politician (c.1633–1708)

Member of Parliament for Beaumaris
- In office 1690–1695

Member of Parliament for Caernarvonshire
- In office 1679 – March 1681
- In office 1685–1687
- In office 10 February 1697 – 1705

Member of Parliament for Anglesey
- In office 1689–1690

Member of Parliament for Caernarvon Boroughs
- In office 1705 – 23 March 1708

Personal details
- Born: c. 1633
- Died: 23 March 1708 (aged 74-75)
- Spouse: Jane Griffith Jones
- Relations: Son of Thomas Bulkeley, 1st Viscount Bulkeley
- Education: Jesus College, Oxford
- Profession: Politician

Thomas Bulkeley (c. 1633 – 1708), of Caernarvonshire, was a Welsh politician.

== Family ==
Bulkeley was the fourth son of Thomas Bulkeley, 1st Viscount Bulkeley, and Blanche Coytmore. He married Jane, daughter of Griffith Jones of Castellmarch, Carnarvonshire and widow of Thomas Williams of Dinas. They had no children.

== Education and career ==
Bulkeley matriculated from Jesus College, Oxford, in 1652 and was admitted to Gray's Inn in 1654. He was a Member of the Parliament of England for Beaumaris (1690–1695), Caernarvonshire (1679 – March 1681, 1685–87 and 10 February 1697 – 1705), Anglesey (1689–1690) and Caernarvon Boroughs (1705 – 23 March 1708) which from 1707 was for the Parliament of Great Britain.

Parliament of England
Preceded by The 2nd Viscount Bulkeley	Member of Parliament for Caernarvonshire; 1679–1689	Succeeded by Sir William Williams, Bt
Preceded by The 2nd Viscount Bulkeley	Member of Parliament for Anglesey; 1689–1690	Succeeded by The 3rd Viscount Bulkeley
Preceded by Sir William Williams	Member of Parliament for Beaumaris; 1690–1695	Succeeded by Sir William Williams
Preceded by Sir William Williams, Bt	Member of Parliament for Caernarvonshire; 1697–1705	Succeeded by Sir John Wynn, Bt
Preceded by Sir John Wynn, Bt	Member of Parliament for Caernarvon Boroughs; 1705–1707	Parliament dissolved
Parliament of Great Britain
New parliament	Member of Parliament for Caernarvon Boroughs; 1707–1708	Succeeded by William Griffith
