= Thomas Bulkeley (died 1593) =

English politician

Thomas Bulkeley (died 1593), of Beaumaris, Anglesey, Wales and Lincoln's Inn, London, was a politician also the 11th baron of bulkeley.

He was a member (MP) of the Parliament of England for Beaumaris 1584, 1586, 1589 and 1593.

He married Elizabeth Grosvenor in 1533 and was father to 5 children, 3 daughters and 2 sons.
