= John Pugh Pryse =

John Pugh Pryse (1739–1774) was the member of Parliament for the constituency of Cardiganshire in 1761–1768 and Merioneth in the parliament of 1768–1774.
