= Viscount Bulkeley =

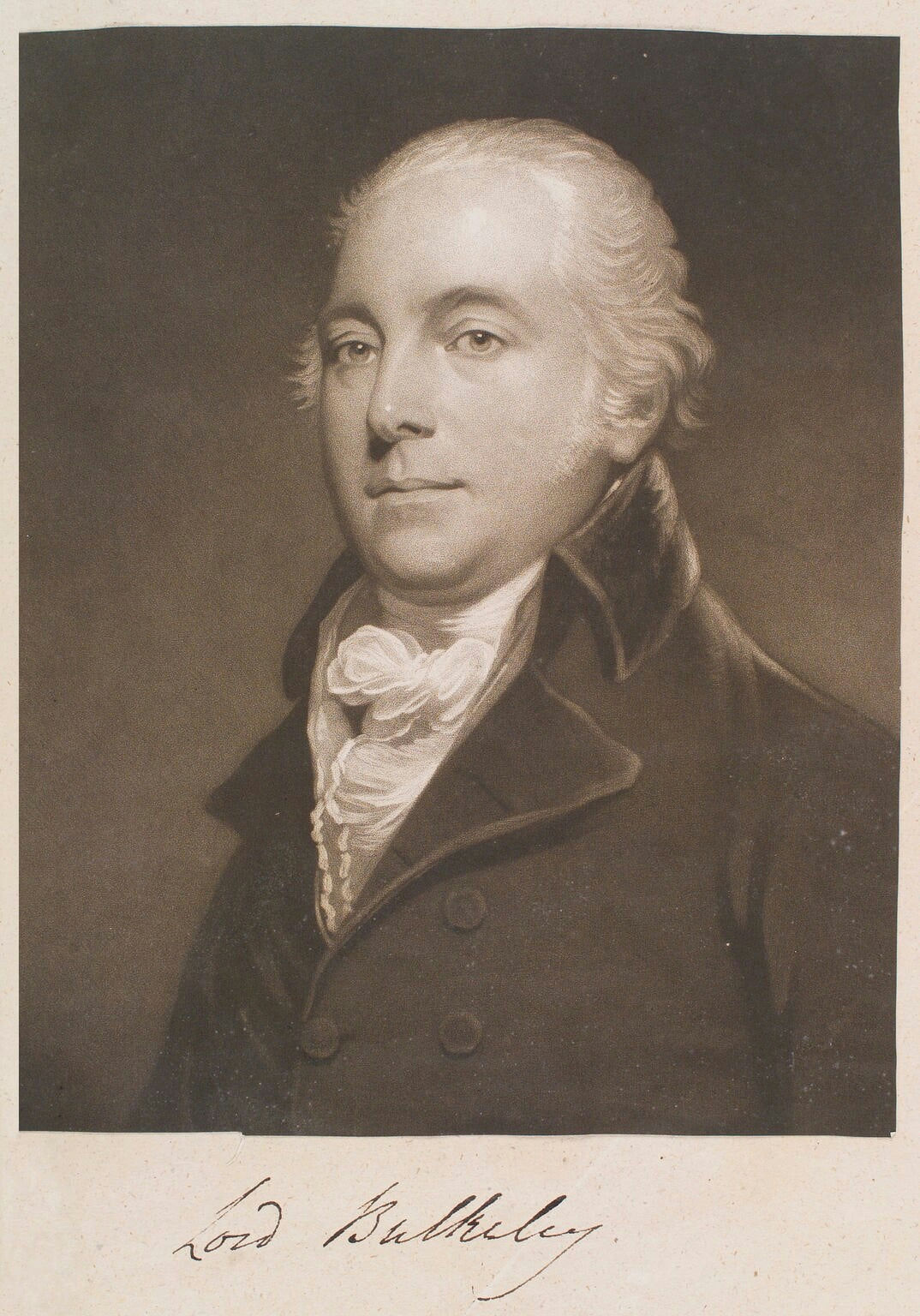
7th Viscount Bulkeley

Viscount Bulkeley, of Cashel in the County of Tipperary, was a title in the Peerage of Ireland. It was created on 19 January 1644 for Thomas Bulkeley, the son of Sir Richard Bulkeley of Beaumaris and a supporter of King Charles I of England. The title descended from father to son until the death of his great-great-grandson, the 5th Viscount, in 1738. The late Viscount was childless and was succeeded by his younger brother, the 6th Viscount. The latter was succeeded by his son, the 7th Viscount. The 7th Viscount was also created Baron Bulkeley, of Beaumaris, in the County of Anglesey, in the Peerage of Great Britain on 14 May 1784, which entitled him to a seat in the House of Lords. In 1802 he assumed by Royal licence the additional surname of Warren, which was that of his father-in-law, Sir George Warren. On his death in 1822 both titles became extinct. Sir Richard Williams, of Penrhyn, succeeded to the Bulkeley estates and assumed by Royal licence the additional surname of Bulkeley.

From the 2nd to the 6th viscount, all viscounts were Members of Parliament.

== Viscounts Bulkeley (1644) ==
- Thomas Bulkeley, 1st Viscount Bulkeley (died c.1659)
- Robert Bulkeley, 2nd Viscount Bulkeley (died 1688)
- Richard Bulkeley, 3rd Viscount Bulkeley (c. 1658–1704)
- Richard Bulkeley, 4th Viscount Bulkeley (1682–1724)
- Richard Bulkeley, 5th Viscount Bulkeley (1708–1738)
- James Bulkeley, 6th Viscount Bulkeley (1717–1752)
- Thomas Bulkeley, 7th Viscount Bulkeley (1752–1822)

== See also ==
- Williams-Bulkeley Baronets
