= Thomas Bulkeley, 1st Viscount Bulkeley =

Thomas Bulkeley, 1st Viscount Bulkeley (1585–1659) was a landowner from North Wales who supported the Royalist cause during the English Civil War.

The son of Sir Richard Bulkeley of Beaumaris and his first wife Mary Burgh, daughter of William, 2nd Baron Burgh, Thomas Bulkeley was a colonel in the Royalist army and was created Viscount Bulkeley of Cashel in the Irish peerage in 1644. A staunch supporter of King Charles I of England, he is said to have invited the king to take up residence at his home, Baron Hill in Beaumaris, Anglesey.

He married twice, firstly to Blanche, the daughter of Richard Coytmore of Coytmore, Caernarvonshire and they had five sons and four daughters, including:

- Richard, who was murdered by Richard Cheadle
- Robert, 2nd Viscount Bulkeley (c. 1630–1688), politician and Member of Parliament
- Thomas (c. 1633–1708), politician and Member of Parliament
- Henry (c. 1641–1698), Master of the Household of Charles II and James II, Member of Parliament
- Penelope Bulkeley, who married Sir Griffith Williams (d.c. 1663), 5th Baronet, of Faenol (Vaynol), Caernarvonshire, whose son was Sir William Williams, 6th Baronet (c. 1668–96)

His second marriage was to the daughter of a Mr Cheadle; they had no children.

Peerage of Ireland
| New creation | Viscount Bulkeley; 1644–1659 | Succeeded by Robert Bulkeley |
