= Beaumaris (UK Parliament constituency) =

UK Parliament constituency (1536–1885)

- Former borough constituency for the House of Commons

1536–1885
- Seats: 1
- Replaced by: Anglesey

Beaumaris (/bjuːˈmærɪs/ bew-MAR-is; Welsh: Biwmares [bɪuˈmɑːrɛs]) was a parliamentary borough in Anglesey, which returned one Member of Parliament (MP) to the House of Commons of the Parliament of England from 1553, then to the Parliament of Great Britain from 1707 to 1800 and to the Parliament of the United Kingdom from 1801 to 1885, when the constituency was abolished. After 1832, the constituency was usually known as the Beaumaris District of Boroughs or simply the Beaumaris Boroughs.

== History ==
As elsewhere in Wales, the Laws in Wales Acts 1535 and 1542 provided Anglesey with two members of parliament, one representing the county and the other representing a borough constituency named after the county town but including other "contributory boroughs" who were jointly responsible for providing for the upkeep of the MP and, in return, were granted a say in his election. However, at this period two towns, Beaumaris and Newborough, were disputing the right to be considered Anglesey's county town: under Henry VIII, Newborough was the assize town, but early in the reign of Edward VI (1547–1553) this function was transferred to Beaumaris. The new constituency was designated as Beaumaris, with Newborough as its only contributory borough, and first returned an MP in 1542; but at the same time as the assize was transferred, Newborough was also relieved of the obligation to contribute to the wages of the MP for Beaumaris which, under the terms of the relevant statute, also extinguished its right to vote in his election. Porritt, the early 20th century expert on the history of the Unreformed House of Commons, concludes that "the probability is that Newborough broke the connection in a fit of ill-humour" rather than that it was contrived by Beaumaris; but within a few decades, as the desirability of being directly represented in Parliament became more widely recognised, Newborough was trying unsuccessfully to regain its former status. On several occasions until the early 18th century, Newborough's inhabitants attempted to vote, but had their votes refused by the returning officer and his decision was upheld by Parliament whenever they petitioned in objection.

The franchise was further restricted in 1562, when Elizabeth I granted Beaumaris a new municipal charter, which reserved the right to vote in parliamentary elections to members of the town corporation. Thereafter until 1832, Beaumaris was a closed "corporation borough" of a type common in England but unknown elsewhere in Wales; its only voters were the mayor, two bailiffs and 21 "capital burgesses", and since they had the sole right to fill any vacancies arising in their number their power was entirely self-perpetuating, making the constituency a completely safe pocket borough. For the best part of two centuries before the Great Reform Act 1832, the nomination was in the hands of the Bulkeley family of Baron Hill, and the elections were never contested.

By 1831, the borough of Beaumaris had a population of 2,497 (though, still, only 24 voters). The Reform Act extended the franchise, and also added three contributory boroughs – Amlwch, Holyhead and Llangefni. This raised the population of the revised Beaumaris Boroughs constituency to 8,547, though the number of qualified voters on the register in 1832 was only 329. This was still in practice a pocket borough, and the first contested election did not take place until the further extension of the franchise by the Representation of the People Act 1867, which brought the electorate up to almost 2,000 in the elections from 1868.

The constituency was abolished by the Redistribution of Seats Act 1885, being merged into the Anglesey county constituency.

== Members of Parliament ==
=== 1542–1640 ===
==== Members for Newborough ====
Parliament	Member
1541	Richard ap Rhydderch, of Myfyrion
1545	Owen ap Hugh
1547	John ap Robert Lloid

==== Members for Beaumaris ====
Parliament	Member	Notes
1553 (Mar)	Maurice Grifith	
1553 (Sep)	Rowland Bulkeley	
1554 (Nov)	William Bulkeley? or William Goodman?	name damaged
1555	Hugh Goodman	
1558–1567	William Price	
1571	William Bulkeley	
1572	Rowland Kenrick	
1584–1593	Thomas Bulkeley	Died 1593
1597–1598	William Jones	
1601	William Maurice	
1604	William Jones	
1614	William Jones	
1621–1622	Sampson Eure	
1624	Charles Jones	
1625	Charles Jones	
1626	Charles Jones	
1628	Charles Jones	
1629–1640	No Parliaments summoned	

=== 1640–1885 ===
Year	Member	Party
1640 (Apr)	Charles Jones	
November 1640	John Griffith	Royalist
August 1642	Griffith died – seat vacant	
1646	William Jones	
December 1648	Jones excluded in Pride's Purge – seat vacant	
1653	Beaumaris was unrepresented in the Barebones Parliament and the First and Second Parliaments of the Protectorate	
January 1659	Griffith Bodwrda	
May 1659	Unrepresented in the restored Rump	
April 1660	Griffith Bodwrda	
April 1661	Heneage Finch	
July 1661	John Robinson	
February 1679	Richard Bulkeley	
August 1679	Hon. Henry Bulkeley	Tory
1689	William Williams	
1690	Thomas Bulkeley	
1695	Sir William Williams	
1698	Owen Hughes	
January 1701	Coningsby Williams	
December 1701	Robert Bulkeley	
1703	Coningsby Williams	
1705	Hon. Henry Bertie	
1727	Watkin Williams-Wynn	Tory
1730	Richard Bulkeley	Tory
1739	James Bulkeley	Tory
1753	John Owen	Opposition Whig
1754	Richard Thelwall Price	
1768	Lieutenant-Colonel Sir Hugh Williams	
1780	Sir George Warren	
1784	Hon. Hugh Fortescue	
1785	Lieutenant-Colonel Sir Hugh Williams	
1794	Sir Watkin Williams-Wynn	
1796	Thomas Wynn	
1807	Sir Edward Lloyd	
1812	Thomas Lewis	
1826	Sir Robert Williams	Whig
1831	Sir Richard Williams-Bulkeley	Whig
1832	Frederick Paget	Whig
1847	Lord George Paget	Whig
1857	Hon. William Owen Stanley	Whig
1859	Hon. William Owen Stanley	Liberal
1874	Morgan Lloyd	Liberal
1885	Constituency abolished	

== Election results ==
=== Elections in the 1830s ===
General election 1830: Beaumaris
Party	Candidate	Votes	%
Whig	Robert Williams	Unopposed	
Whig hold			

Williams' death caused a by-election.

By-election, 8 February 1831: Beaumaris
Party	Candidate	Votes	%
Whig	Richard Williams-Bulkeley	Unopposed	
Registered electors		c. 22	
Whig hold			

General election 1831: Beaumaris
Party	Candidate	Votes	%
Whig	Richard Williams-Bulkeley	Unopposed	
Registered electors		c. 22	
Whig hold			

General election 1832: Beaumaris
Party	Candidate	Votes	%
Whig	Frederick Paget	Unopposed	
Registered electors		329	
Whig hold			

General election 1835: Beaumaris
Party	Candidate	Votes	%
Whig	Frederick Paget	Unopposed	
Registered electors		218	
Whig hold			

General election 1837: Beaumaris
Party	Candidate	Votes	%
Whig	Frederick Paget	Unopposed	
Registered electors		323	
Whig hold			

=== Elections in the 1840s ===
General election 1841: Beaumaris
Party	Candidate	Votes	%	±%
Whig	Frederick Paget	Unopposed		
Registered electors		298		
Whig hold				

General election 1847: Beaumaris
Party	Candidate	Votes	%	±%
Whig	George Paget	Unopposed		
Registered electors		335		
Whig hold				

=== Elections in the 1850s ===
General election 1852: Beaumaris
Party	Candidate	Votes	%	±%
Whig	George Paget	Unopposed		
Registered electors		459		
Whig hold				

General election 1857: Beaumaris
Party	Candidate	Votes	%	±%
Whig	William Owen Stanley	Unopposed		
Registered electors		473		
Whig hold				

General election 1859: Beaumaris
Party	Candidate	Votes	%	±%
Liberal	William Owen Stanley	Unopposed		
Registered electors		521		
Liberal hold				

=== Elections in the 1860s ===
General election 1865: Beaumaris
Party	Candidate	Votes	%	±%
Liberal	William Owen Stanley	Unopposed		
Registered electors		558		
Liberal hold				

General election 1868: Beaumaris
Party	Candidate	Votes	%	±%
Liberal	William Owen Stanley	941	59.1	N/A
Liberal	Morgan Lloyd	650	40.9	N/A
Majority		291	18.2	N/A
Turnout		1,591	81.8	N/A
Registered electors		1,944		
Liberal hold		Swing	N/A	

=== Elections in the 1870s ===
General election 1874: Beaumaris
Party	Candidate	Votes	%	±%
Liberal	Morgan Lloyd	947	61.3	+20.4
Conservative	Thomas Lewis Hampton-Lewis	344	22.3	New
Liberal	Edmund Verney	255	16.5	N/A
Majority		603	39.0	+20.8
Turnout		1,546	75.5	−6.3
Registered electors		2,048		
Liberal hold		Swing	N/A	

=== Elections in the 1880s ===
General election 1880: Beaumaris
Party	Candidate	Votes	%	±%
Liberal	Morgan Lloyd	Unopposed		
Registered electors		2,581		
Liberal hold				

== Sources ==
- Beatson, Robert (1807). A Chronological Register of Both Houses of the British Parliament, from the Union in 1708, to the Third Parliament of the United Kingdom of Great Britain and Ireland, in 1807. Longman, Hurst, Rees, and Orme.
- Cobbett, William, ed. (1806). "Cobbett's parliamentary history of England, from the Norman Conquest, in 1066 to the year 1803". London: R. Bagshaw. Archived from the original on 4 September 2015 – via Oxford Digital Library.
- F W S Craig, British Parliamentary Election Results 1832–1885 (2nd edition, Aldershot: Parliamentary Research Services, 1989)
- England and Wales Parliament House of Commons; Great Britain Parliament House of Commons (1988). Maija Jansson (ed.). Proceedings in Parliament, 1614 (House of Commons). American Philosophical Society. ISBN 9780871691729.
- J Holladay Philbin, Parliamentary Representation 1832 – England and Wales (New Haven: Yale University Press, 1965)
- Edward Porritt and Annie G Porritt, The Unreformed House of Commons (Cambridge University Press, 1903)
- Robert Walcott, English Politics in the Early Eighteenth Century (Oxford: Oxford University Press, 1956)
- Leigh Rayment's Historical List of MPs – Constituencies beginning with "B" (part 1)
