= Robert Bulkeley, 2nd Viscount Bulkeley =

British politician

Robert Bulkeley, 2nd Viscount Bulkeley of Cashel (died 18 October 1688) was an English peer and politician.

He was born the second son of Thomas Bulkeley, 1st Viscount Bulkeley of Baron Hill, Beaumaris and inherited the title from his father after his elder brother Richard was murdered. His mother was Blanche Cotymore, daughter of Richard Cotymore.

He was appointed Sheriff of Anglesey for 1658 and elected the Member of Parliament for Anglesey for 1660–1661, Caernarvonshire, 1675–1679, and Anglesey for the second time from 1685 to 1689.

He married Sarah, the daughter of Daniel Hervey of Coombe in Surrey. They had three sons and six daughters. He was succeeded by his eldest son Richard. Of his younger sons, Robert Bulkeley (died 1702), became MP for Beaumaris and Thomas became MP for Caernarvonshire.

Parliament of England
Preceded by George Twisleton	Member of Parliament for Anglesey; 1660–1661	Succeeded by Nicholas Bagenal
Preceded by Sir Richard Wynn, Bt	Member of Parliament for Caernarvonshire; 1675–1679	Succeeded by Hon. Thomas Bulkeley
Preceded by Hon. Richard Bulkeley	Member of Parliament for Anglesey; 1685–1689	Succeeded by Hon. Thomas Bulkeley
Honorary titles
Preceded by John Robinson	Vice-Admiral of North Wales; 1679–1688	Succeeded by Sir William Williams, Bt
Peerage of Ireland
Preceded by Thomas Bulkeley	Viscount Bulkeley; 1659–1688	Succeeded by Richard Bulkeley
