= Richard Bulkeley, 3rd Viscount Bulkeley =

Welsh politician and peer

Richard Bulkeley, 3rd Viscount Bulkeley (c. 1658 – 9 August 1704) was a Welsh politician and peer.

Bulkeley was the eldest son of Robert Bulkeley, 2nd Viscount Bulkeley and Sarah, daughter of Daniel Harvey of London and sister of Sir Daniel Harvey. He succeeded as Viscount Bulkeley on his father's death in 1688. He married firstly Mary, daughter of Sir Philip Egerton of Oulton, Cheshire, in 1681 with whom he had one son, Richard, who succeeded to his title. He married secondly Elizabeth, daughter of Henry White of Henllan, Pembrokeshire, without issue.

He represented Beaumaris in the Parliament of England in 1679, before representing Anglesey until 1685 when he was succeeded by his father. He represented the seat again from 1690 until his death in 1704, when he was succeeded by his son.

He held local offices as Custos Rotulorum of Caernarvonshire (1679–1688), Custos Rotulorum of Anglesey (1690–1704), Mayor of Beaumaris (1689–1690) and Constable of Beaumaris Castle (1689–1702).

Parliament of England
Preceded by John Robinson	Member of Parliament for Beaumaris; 1679	Succeeded by Henry Bulkeley
Preceded by Henry Bulkeley	Member of Parliament for Anglesey; 1679–1685	Succeeded by The 2nd Viscount Bulkeley
Preceded by Thomas Bulkeley	Member of Parliament for Anglesey; 1690–1704	Succeeded by The 4th Viscount Bulkeley
Peerage of Ireland
Preceded by Robert Bulkeley	Viscount Bulkeley; 1688–1704	Succeeded by Richard Bulkeley
