= Robert Bulkeley (died 1702) =

Member of Parliament for Beaumaris
- In office December 1701 – 23 December 1702 Serving with Peter Walter

Personal details
- Died: 23 December 1702 London, England
- Relations: Henry Bulkeley (uncle)
- Relatives: Robert Bulkeley, 2nd Viscount Bulkeley (father)
- Education: Christ Church, Oxford

Robert Bulkeley (died 23 December 1702) was a Welsh politician who was Member of Parliament (MP) for Beaumaris. His uncle Henry Bulkeley was Master of the Household to Charles II and James II before going into exile after the Glorious Revolution. His father the 2nd Viscount Bulkeley was also an MP.
