= Richard Cantillon =

Irish-French economist and banker (c. 1680 – 1734)

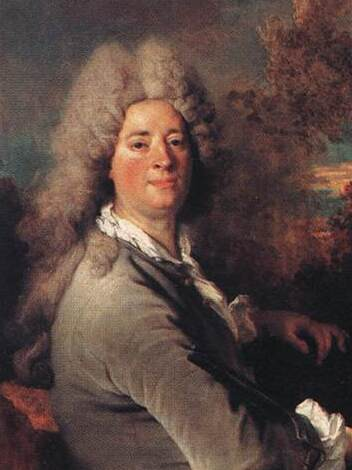
- Detail of a male subject in Family Portrait by Nicolas de Largillière, c. 1730, argued by Mark Thornton to be a possibly authentic depiction of Cantillon.
- Born: 1680s Ballyronan, County Kerry, Ireland
- Died: 1734 (aged about 54); London, England, Great Britain

Philosophical work
- Era: Age of Enlightenment
- Region: Western philosophy
- School: Physiocracy
- Main interests: Political economy
- Notable ideas: Entrepreneur as risk-bearer, monetary theory, spatial economics, theory of population growth, cause and effect methodology

Richard Cantillon (French: [kɑ̃tijɔ̃]; 1680s – May 1734) was an Irish-French economist and author of Essai Sur La Nature Du Commerce En Général (Essay on the Nature of Trade in General), a book considered by William Stanley Jevons to be the "cradle of political economy". Although little information exists on Cantillon's life, it is known that he became a successful banker and merchant at an early age. His success was largely derived from the political and business connections he made through his family and through an early employer, James Brydges. During the late 1710s and early 1720s, Cantillon speculated in, and later helped fund, John Law's Mississippi Company, from which he acquired great wealth. However, his success came at a cost to his debtors, who pursued him with lawsuits, criminal charges, and even murder plots until his death in 1734.

Essai remains Cantillon's only surviving contribution to economics. It was written around 1730 and circulated widely in manuscript form, but was not published until 1755. His work was translated into Spanish by Gaspar Melchor de Jovellanos, probably in the late 1770s, and considered essential reading for political economy. Despite having much influence on the early development of the physiocrat and classical schools of thought, Essai was largely forgotten until its rediscovery by Jevons in the late 19th century. Cantillon was influenced by his experiences as a banker, and especially by the speculative bubble of John Law's Mississippi Company. He was also heavily influenced by prior economists, especially William Petty.

Essai is considered the first complete treatise on economics, with numerous contributions to the science. These contributions include: his cause and effect methodology, monetary theories, his conception of the entrepreneur as a risk-bearer, and the development of spatial economics. Cantillon's Essai had significant influence on the early development of political economy, including the works of Adam Smith, Anne Turgot, Jean-Baptiste Say, Frédéric Bastiat and François Quesnay.

== Early life ==
While details regarding Richard Cantillon's early life are limited, it is estimated that he was born between 1680 and 1690 in Ballyronan, Ballyheigue, Ireland, according to Cantillon biographer C.J Woods. He was the second son of Richard Cantillon, a farmer descended from a Catholic landed family whose estates at Ballyheigue had been confiscated during the Cromwellian confiscations, and his wife Brigid Cantillon.

Cantillon's parents were close enough kin, through David Cantillon of Limerick, and his wife Jane Cantillon (née Arthur); whose brother was the noted banker Sir Daniel Arthur, that their marriage required a dispensation for consanguinity from the Catholic Church.

== Career ==
Cantillon had moved from Ireland to France by 1708 where he attained French citizenship. By 1711, Cantillon found himself in the employment of British Paymaster General James Brydges, in Spain, where he organised payments to British prisoners of war during the War of Spanish Succession. Cantillon remained in Spain until 1714, cultivating a number of business and political connections, before returning to Paris. Cantillon then became involved in the banking industry working for a cousin, who at that time was lead-correspondent of the Parisian branch of a family bank. Two years later, thanks in large part to financial backing by James Brydges, Cantillon bought his cousin out and attained ownership of the bank. Given the financial and political connections Cantillon was able to attain both through his family and through James Brydges, Cantillon proved a fairly successful banker, specialising in money transfers between Paris and London.

At this time, Cantillon became involved with British mercantilist John Law through the Mississippi Company. Based on the monetary theory proposed by William Potter in his 1650 tract The Key of Wealth, John Law posited that increases in the money supply would lead to the employment of unused land and labour, leading to higher productivity. In 1716, the French government granted him both permission to found the Banque Générale and virtual monopoly over the right to develop French territories in North America, named the Mississippi Company. In return, Law promised the French government to finance its debt at low rates of interest. Law began a financial speculative bubble by selling shares of the Mississippi Company, using the Banque Générale's virtual monopoly on the issue of bank notes to finance his investors.

Richard Cantillon amassed a great fortune from his speculation, buying Mississippi Company shares early and selling them later at higher prices, even though he had stated he believed Law's "scheme was unsound and was bound to fail." Cantillon's financial success and growing influence caused friction in his relationship with John Law, and sometime thereafter Law threatened to imprison Cantillon if the latter did not leave France within twenty-four hours. Cantillon replied: "I shall not go away; but I will make your system succeed." To that end, in 1718 Law, Cantillon, and wealthy speculator Joseph Gage formed a private company centred on financing further speculation in North American real estate.

In 1719, Cantillon left Paris for Amsterdam, returning briefly in early 1720. Lending in Paris, Cantillon had outlying debt repaid to him in London and Amsterdam. With the collapse of the "Mississippi bubble", Cantillon was able to collect on debt accruing high rates of interest. Most of his debtors had suffered financial damage in the bubble collapse and blamed Cantillon—until his death, Cantillon was involved in countless lawsuits filed by his debtors, leading to a number of murder plots and criminal accusations.

== Contributions to economics ==
Although there is evidence that Richard Cantillon wrote a wide variety of manuscripts, only his Essai Sur La Nature Du Commerce En Général (abbreviated Essai) survives. Written in 1730, it was published in French in 1755, and was translated into English by Henry Higgs in 1932. Evidence suggests that Essai had tremendous influence on the early development of economic science. However, Cantillon's treatise was largely neglected during the 19th century. In the late 19th century it was "rediscovered" by William Stanley Jevons, who considered it the "cradle of political economy". Since then, Cantillon's Essai has received growing attention. Essai is considered the first complete treatise on economic theory, and Cantillon has been called the "father of enterprise economics".

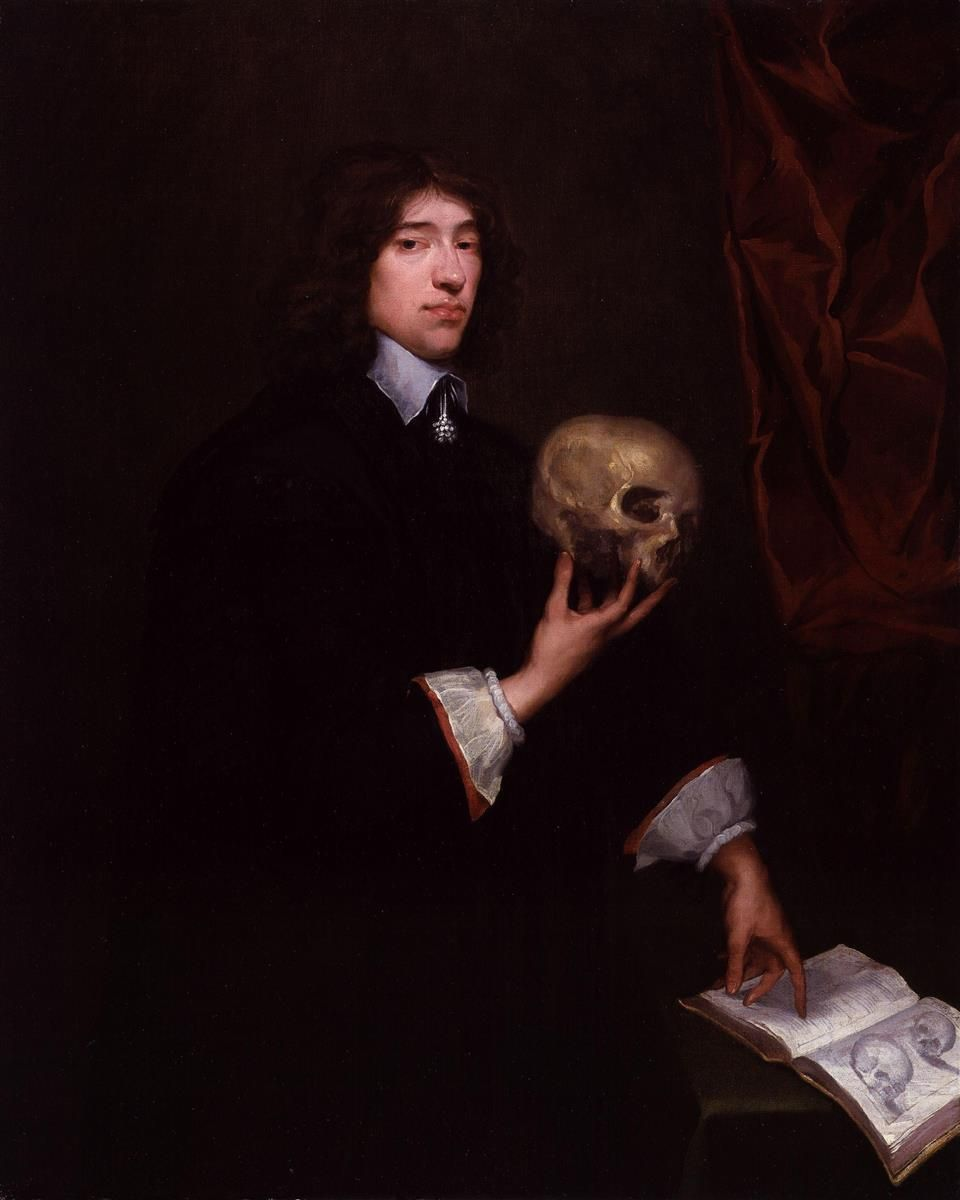
William Petty is considered to be one of Richard Cantillon's greatest influences.

One of the greatest influences on Cantillon's writing was English economist William Petty and his 1662 tract Treatise on Taxes. Although Petty provided much of the groundwork for Cantillon's Essai, Anthony Brewer argues that Petty's influence has been overstated. Apart from Petty, other possible influences on Cantillon include John Locke, Cicero, Livy, Pliny the Elder, Pliny the Younger, Charles Davenant, Edmond Halley, Isaac Newton, Sébastien Le Prestre de Vauban, and Jean Boisard. Cantillon's involvement in John Law's speculative bubble proved invaluable and likely heavily influenced his insight on the relationship between increases in the supply of money, price, and production.

=== Methodology ===
Cantillon's Essai is written using a distinctive causal methodology, separating Cantillon from his mercantilist predecessors. Essai is peppered with the word "natural", which in the case of Cantillon's treatise is meant to imply a cause and effect relationship between economic actions and their underlying (i.e. causing) phenomena. Economist Murray Rothbard credits Cantillon with being one of the first theorists to isolate economic phenomena with simple models, where otherwise-uncontrollable variables can be fixed. Cantillon made frequent use of the concept of ceteris paribus throughout Essai in an attempt to neglect independent variables. Furthermore, he is credited with employing a methodology similar to Carl Menger's methodological individualism, by deducing complex phenomena from simple observations.

A cause and effect methodology led to a relatively value-free approach to economic science, in which Cantillon was uninterested in the merit of any particular economic action or phenomenon, focusing rather on the explanation of relationships. This led Cantillon to separate economic science from politics and ethics to a greater degree than previous mercantilist writers. This has led to disputes on whether Cantillon can justly be considered a mercantilist or one of the first anti-mercantilists, given that Cantillon often cited government-manipulated trade surpluses and specie accumulation as positive economic stimuli. Others argue that in instances where Cantillon is thought to have supported certain mercantilist policies, he actually provided a more neutral analysis by explicitly stating possible limitations of mercantilist policies.

=== Monetary theory ===
Differences between prior mercantilists and Cantillon arise early in Essai, regarding the origins of wealth and price formation on the market. Cantillon distinguishes between wealth and money, considering wealth in itself "nothing but the food, conveniences, and pleasures of life." While Cantillon advocated an "intrinsic" theory of value, based on the input of land and labour (cost of production), he is considered to have touched upon a subjective theory of value. Cantillon held that market prices are not immediately decided by intrinsic value, but are derived from supply and demand. He considered market prices to be derived by comparing supply, the quantity of a particular good in a particular market, to demand, the quantity of money brought to be exchanged. Believing market prices to tend towards the intrinsic value of a good, Cantillon may have also originated the uniformity-of-profit principle—changes in the market price of a good may lead to changes in supply, reflecting a rise or fall in profit.

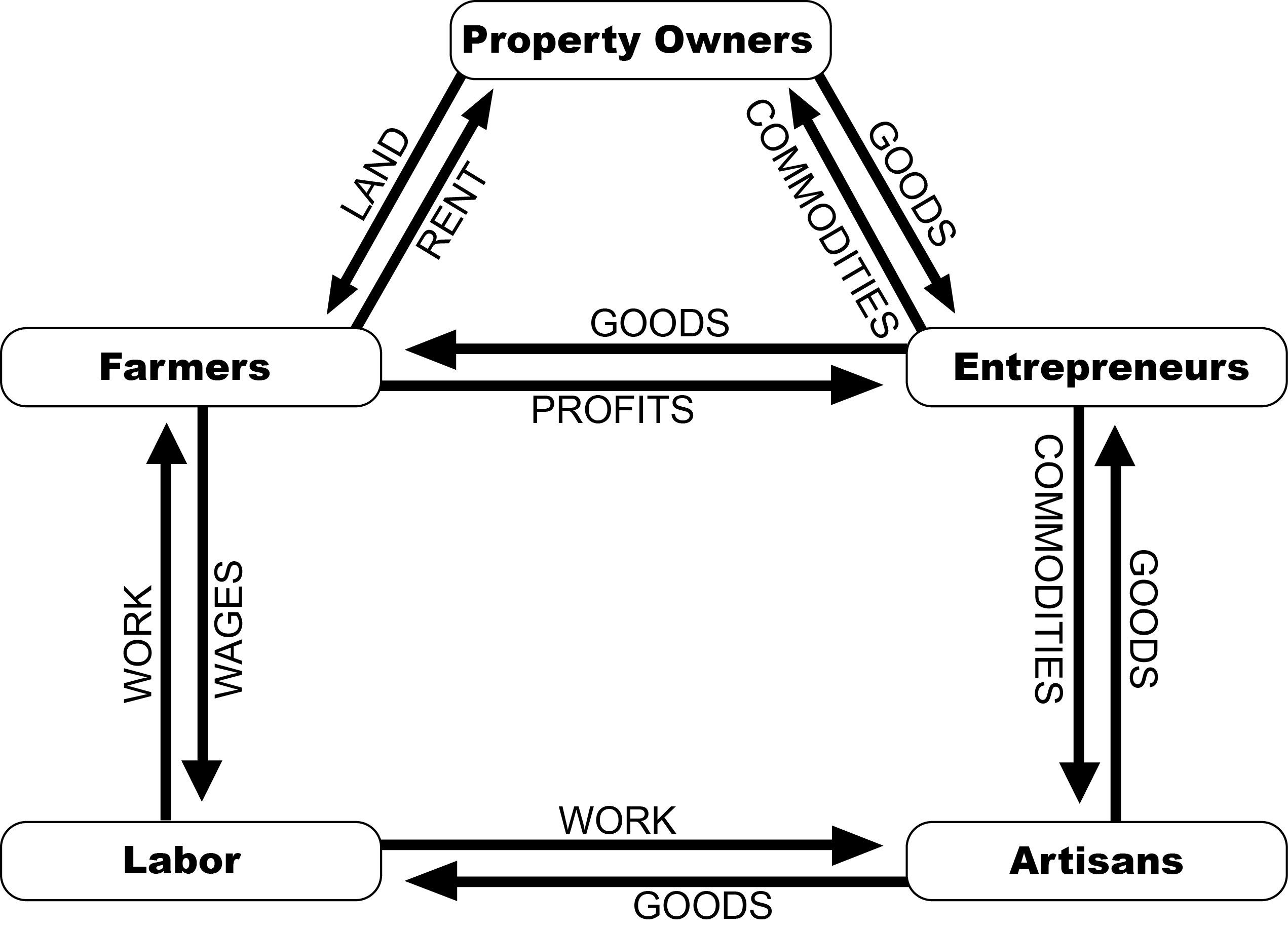
Rendition of Cantillon's primitive circular flow model

In Essai, Cantillon provided an advanced version of John Locke's quantity theory of money, focusing on relative inflation and the velocity of money. Cantillon suggested that inflation occurs gradually and that the new supply of money has a localised effect on inflation, effectively originating the concept of non-neutral money. Furthermore, he posited that the original recipients of new money enjoy higher standards of living at the expense of later recipients. The concept of relative inflation, or a disproportionate rise in prices among different goods in an economy, is now known as the Cantillon effect. Cantillon also considered changes in the velocity of money (quantity of exchanges made within a specific amount of time) influential on prices, although not to the same degree as changes in the quantity of money. While he believed that the money supply consisted only of specie, he conceded that increases in money substitutes—or bank notes—could affect prices by effectively increasing the velocity of circulating of deposited specie. Apart from distinguishing money from money substitute, he also distinguished between bank notes offered as receipts for specie deposits and bank notes circulating beyond the quantity of specie—or fiduciary media—suggesting that the volume of fiduciary media is strictly limited by people's confidence in its redeemability. He considered fiduciary media a useful tool to abate the downward pressure that hoarding of specie has on the velocity of money.

Addressing the mercantilist belief that monetary intervention could cause a perpetually favourable balance of trade, Cantillon developed a specie-flow mechanism foreshadowing future international monetary equilibrium theories. He suggested that in countries with a high quantity of money in circulation, prices will increase and therefore become less competitive in relation to countries where there is a relative scarcity of money. Thus, Cantillon also held that increases in the supply of money, regardless of the source, cause increases in the price level and therefore reduce the competitiveness of a particular nation's industry in relation to a nation with lower prices. However, Cantillon did not believe that international markets tended toward equilibrium, and instead suggested that government hoard specie to avoid rising prices and falling competitiveness. Furthermore, he suggested that a favourable balance of trade can be maintained by offering a better product and retaining qualitative competitiveness. Cantillon's preference towards a favourable balance of trade possibly stemmed from the mercantilist belief in exchange being a zero-sum game, in which one party gains at the expense of another.

A relatively advanced theory of interest is also presented. Cantillon believed that interest originates from the need of borrowers for capital and from the fear of loss of the lenders, meaning that borrowers have to recompense lenders for the risk of the possible insolvency of the debtor. In turn, interest is paid out of earned profits originating from the return on invested capital. While previously it was believed that the rate of interest varied inversely to the quantity of money, Cantillon posited that the rate of interest was determined by the supply and demand on the loanable funds market—an insight usually attributed to Scottish philosopher David Hume. As such, while saved money impacts the rate of interest, new money that is instead used for consumption does not; Cantillon's theory of interest is therefore similar to John Maynard Keynes's liquidity preference theory.

=== Other contributions ===
Traditionally, it is Jean-Baptiste Say who is credited for coining the word and advancing the concept of the entrepreneur, but in fact it was Cantillon who first introduced the term in Essai. Cantillon divided society into two principal classes—fixed income wage-earners and non-fixed income earners. Entrepreneurs, according to Cantillon, are non-fixed income earners who pay known costs of production but earn uncertain incomes, due to the speculative nature of pandering to an unknown demand for their product. Cantillon, while providing the foundations, did not develop a dedicated theory of uncertainty—the topic was not revisited until the 20th century, by Ludwig von Mises, Frank Knight, and John Maynard Keynes, among others. Furthermore, unlike later theories of entrepreneurship which saw the entrepreneur as a disruptive force, Cantillon anticipated the belief that the entrepreneur brought equilibrium to a market by correctly predicting consumer preferences.

Spatial economics deal with distance and area, and how these may affect a market through transportation costs and geographical limitations. The development of spatial economics is usually ascribed to German economist Johann Heinrich von Thünen; however, Cantillon addressed spatial economics nearly a century earlier. Cantillon integrated his advancements in spatial economic theory into his microeconomic analysis of the market, describing how transportation costs influence the location of factories, markets and population centres—that is, individuals strive to lower transportation costs. Conclusions on spatial economics were derived from three premises: cost of raw materials of equal quality will always be higher near the capital city, due to transportation costs; transportation costs vary on transportation type (for example, water transportation was, and often still is, cheaper than land-based transportation); and larger goods that are more difficult to transport will always be cheaper closer to their area of production. For example, Cantillon believed markets were designed as they were to decrease costs to both merchants and villagers in terms of time and transportation. Similarly, Cantillon posited that the locations of cities were the result in large part of the wealth of inhabiting property owners and their ability to afford transportation costs—wealthier property owners tended to live farther from their property, because they could afford the transportation costs. In Essai, spatial economic theory was used to derive why markets occupied the geographical area they did and why costs varied across different markets.

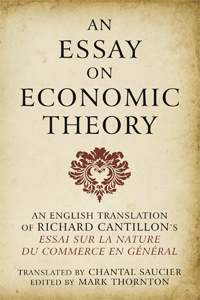
Cover of the Ludwig von Mises Institute's edition of Cantillon's Essai

Apart from originating theories on the entrepreneur and spatial economics, Cantillon also provided a dedicated theory on population growth. Unlike William Petty, who believed there always existed a considerable amount of unused land and economic opportunity to support economic growth, Cantillon theorised that population grows only as long as there are economic opportunities present. Specifically, Cantillon cited three determining variables for population size: natural resources, technology, and culture. Therefore, populations grow only as far as the three aforementioned variables allowed. Furthermore, Cantillon's population theory was more modern than that of Malthus in the sense that Cantillon recognised a much broader category of factors which affect population growth, including the tendency for population growth to fall to zero as a society becomes more industrialised.

== Influence ==
While the Essai was not published until 1755 as a result of heavy censorship in France, it did widely circulate in the form of an unpublished manuscript between its completion and its publication. It notably influenced many direct forerunners of the classical school of thought, including Turgot and other physiocrats. Cantillon was a major influence on physiocrat François Quesnay, who has probably had access to his work through the marquis de Mirabeau, who possessed a manuscript of the Essai since 1740. While it is evident that the Essai influenced Quesnay, to what degree remains controversial. There is evidence that Quesnay did not fully understand, or was not completely aware of, Cantillon's theories. Many of Quesnay's economic beliefs were elucidated previously in the Essai, but Quesnay did reject a number of Cantillon's premises, including the scarcity of land and Cantillon's population theory. Also, Quesnay recognised the scarcity of capital and capital accumulation as a prerequisite for investment. Nevertheless, Cantillon was considered the "father of physiocracy" by Henry Higgs, due to his influence on Quesnay. It is also possible that Cantillon influenced Scottish economist James Steuart, both directly and indirectly.

Cantillon is one of the few economists cited by Adam Smith, who directly borrows Cantillon's subsistence theory of wages. Large sections of Smith's economic theory were possibly directly influenced by Cantillon, although in many respects Adam Smith advanced well beyond the scope of Cantillon. Some economic historians have argued that Adam Smith provided little of value from his own intellect, notably Schumpeter and Rothbard. In any case, through his influence on Adam Smith and the physiocrats, Cantillon was quite possibly the pre-classical economist who contributed most to the ideas of the classical school. Illustrative of this was Cantillon's influence on Jean-Baptiste Say, which is noticeable in the methodology employed in the latter's Treatise on Political Economy.

== Personal life ==
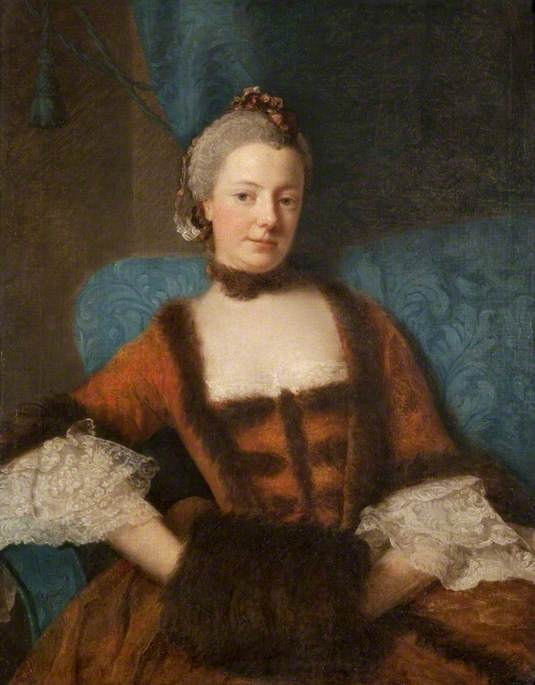
Portrait of his daughter, Henrietta Diana, Dowager Countess of Stafford, by Allan Ramsay, 1759

On 16 February 1722, Cantillon married Mary Anne O'Mahony (1701–1751), daughter of Cecilia Weld and Count Daniel O'Mahony—a wealthy merchant and former Irish general—spending much of the remainder of the 1720s travelling throughout Europe with his wife. Cantillon and Mary had a son, who died at a young age, and a daughter:

- Henrietta Cantillon (1728–1761), who married William Stafford-Howard, 3rd Earl of Stafford, son of William Stafford-Howard, 2nd Earl of Stafford, in 1743. After his death, she married Robert Maxwell, 1st Earl of Farnham, son of John Maxwell, 1st Baron Farnham, in 1759.

Although he frequently returned to Paris between 1729 and 1733, his permanent residence was in London. In May 1734, his residence in London was burned to the ground, and it is generally assumed that Cantillon died in the fire. While the fire's causes are unclear, the most widely accepted theory is that Cantillon was murdered. One of Cantillon's biographers, Antoine Murphy, has advanced the alternative theory that Cantillon staged his own death to escape the harassment of his debtors, appearing in Suriname under the name Chevalier de Louvigny.

After his death, his widow married François de Bulkeley, son of Hon. Henry Bulkeley (himself son of the 1st Viscount Bulkeley) and Sophia Stuart (sister of the Duchess of Richmond, daughter of Dr. Walter Stewart and granddaughter of the 1st Lord Blantyre), and a sister of Anne, Duchess of Berwick (second wife of James FitzJames, 1st Duke of Berwick).

== Bibliography ==
- Bordo, Michael David (1983). "Some Aspects of the Monetary Economics of Richard Cantillon (subscription required)". Journal of Monetary Economics. 12 (2): 235–258. doi:10.1016/0304-3932(83)90002-8.
- Brewer, Anthony (1988). "Cantillon and Mercantilism (subscription required)". History of Political Economy. 20 (3): 447–460. doi:10.1215/00182702-20-3-447.
- Brewer, Anthony (1992). Richard Cantillon: Pioneer of Economic Theory. London: Routledge. ISBN 978-1-61016-001-8.
- Cantillon, Richard (2010) [1755]. An Essay on Economic Theory. Auburn, AL: Ludwig von Mises Institute. ISBN 978-0-415-07577-0.
- Finegold Catalán, Jonathan M. (4 June 2010). "A Primer on Austrian Economics". Mises Daily.
- Finegold Catalán, Jonathan M. (16 September 2010). "Richard Cantillon: Founder of Political Economy". Mises Daily.
- Hayek, Friedrich A. (1991). The Trend in Economic Thinking. Indianapolis, IN: Liberty Fund. ISBN 978-0-86597-742-6.
- Hébert, Robert F. (February 1981). "Richard Cantillon's Early Contributions to Spatial Economics". Economica. 48 (189): 71–77. doi:10.2307/2552944. JSTOR 2552944. (subscription required)
- Higgs, Henry (July 1892). "Cantillon's Place in Economics". The Quarterly Journal of Economics. 6 (4): 436–456. doi:10.2307/1882513. JSTOR 1882513. (subscription required)
- Higgs, Henry (June 1891). "Richard Cantillon". The Economic Journal. 1 (2): 262–291. doi:10.2307/2956249. JSTOR 2956249.(subscription required)
- Hone, Joseph (April 1944). "Richard Cantillon, Economist: Biographical Note". The Economic Journal. 54 (213): 96–100. doi:10.2307/2959833. JSTOR 2959833. (subscription required)
- Hülsmann, Jörg Guido (2002). "More on Cantillon as a Proto-Austrian". Journal des Économistes et des Études Humaines. 11 (4): 693–703. doi:10.2202/1145-6396.1036. S2CID 201278274. Archived from the original on 11 June 2011.
- Hyse, Richard (December 1971). "Richard Cantillon, Financier to Amsterdam, July to November 1720". The Economic Journal. 81 (324): 812–827. doi:10.2307/2230319. JSTOR 2230319. (subscription required)
- Jevons, William Stanley (January 1881). "Richard Cantillon and the Nationality of Political Economy". Contemporary Review: 333–360.
- Marx, Karl (2007) [1867]. Capital: A Critique of Political Economy, Volume I – Part II. New York: Harriman House Ltd. ISBN 978-1-60520-007-1.
- Rothbard, Murray N. (1995). An Austrian Perspective on the History of Economic Thought, Volume I (Economic Thought Before Adam Smith) (PDF). Auburn, AL: Ludwig von Mises Institute. ISBN 978-0-945466-48-2.
- Salerno, Joseph T. (Fall 1985). "The Influence of Cantillon's Essai on the Methodology of J. B. Say: A Comment on Liggit" (PDF). The Journal of Libertarian Studies. 7 (2): 305–316.
- Schumpeter, Joseph A. (1981). History of Economic Analysis. Routledge. ISBN 978-0-415-10888-1.
- Smith, Adam (2009). The Wealth of Nations. Petersfield, UK: Harriman House Ltd. ISBN 978-1-905641-26-0.
- Smith, George H. (2008). "Cantillon, Richard (c. 1680–1734)". In Hamowy, Ronald (ed.). Bastiat, Frédéric (1801–1850). The Encyclopedia of Libertarianism. Thousand Oaks, CA: Sage; Cato Institute. pp. 47–48. doi:10.4135/9781412965811.n16. ISBN 978-1-4129-6580-4. LCCN 2008009151. OCLC 750831024.
- Spengler, Joseph J. (August 1954). "Richard Cantillon: First of the Moderns. I". The Journal of Political Economy. 62 (4): 281–295. doi:10.1086/257535. JSTOR 1827232. S2CID 222442951. (subscription required)
- Spengler, Joseph J. (October 1954). "Richard Cantillon: First of the Moderns. II". The Journal of Political Economy. 62 (5): 406–424. doi:10.1086/257574. JSTOR 1826522. S2CID 154550802. (subscription required)
- Tarascio, Vincent J. (Fall 1985). "Cantillon's Essai: A Current Perspective" (PDF). Journal of Libertarian Studies. 29 (2): 249–257.
- Thornton, Mark (2018). "Incorporating Cantillon: A Face and a Family for the First Modern Economist?". Huntington Library Quarterly. 81 (2): 277–289. doi:10.1353/hlq.2018.0012. ISSN 0018-7895. JSTOR 90023624.
- Thornton, Mark (2007). "Cantillon the Anti-Mercantilist" (PDF). Working Paper: 1–33.
- Thornton, Mark (December 2007). "Was Richard Cantillon a Mercantilist?". Journal of the History of Economic Thought. 29 (4): 417–435. doi:10.1080/10427710701666495. S2CID 17759147. (subscription required)
- Thornton, Mark (1999). "Chapter 2. Richard Cantillon: The Origin of Economic Theory" (PDF). In Holcombe, Randall G. (ed.). The Great Austrian Economists. Auburn, AL: Ludwig von Mises Institute. ISBN 978-0-945466-04-8.
