= Daniel O'Mahony (general) =

Irish Jacobite army officer in French and Spanish service

Lieutenant-General Daniel O'Mahony Count of Castile
- Born: c. 1640; Ireland
- Died: January 1714; Ocaña, Spain
- Occupation: Army officer
- Spouse(s): Cecilia Weld (died 1708) Charlotte, Viscountess Clare (m. 1712; died 1714)
- Children: 5

Daniel O'Mahony, Count of Castile (c. 1640 – January 1714) was an Irish Jacobite army officer in French and Castilian service.

== Early life ==
O'Mahony came of an ancient Irish stock which claimed descent from Brian, King of Munster. His parents were John O'Mahony of Coolcorkerane, and Mary Joan O'Moriarty. His brother Dermod attained the rank of colonel in James II's Irish army and distinguished himself at the Boyne and at Aughrim, where he met his death.

== Career ==
Having attained the rank of captain in the royal Irish foot-guards, Daniel went to France in 1692, and became major in the Limerick and Dillon regiments successively. He served under Villeroy in the north of Italy in the autumn of 1701, and he held the command of Dillon's regiment during the absence of its colonel in January 1702. The regiment was then forming part of the garrison of Cremona, and O'Mahony woke up on 1 February to find Villeroy a captive, and the Austrians, who had obtained entrance into Cremona by means of a sewer, in possession of the town. Prince Eugène had discovered the quarters of many of the French officers, who were captured before they had time to dress. O'Mahony, however, seized his pistols, and found means of joining a detachment of his regiment which held the Po gate. This position formed the nucleus of an effective resistance to Eugène's occupation of the town. As O'Mahony obtained reinforcements he spread them along the ramparts, and kept up a galling fusillade on the enemy. This diversion gave the Comte de Revel time to concentrate and reanimate a large number of French troops in the neighbourhood of the Mantua gate, and Eugène, finding himself between two fires, thought it expedient to retire from the city after a vain attempt to bribe O'Mahony to relinquish his occupation of the Po gate. Thus ended the surprise of Cremona, one of the most remarkable events in modern warfare: a garrison of seven thousand men, in a town strongly fortified, surprised in their beds, obliged to march in their shirts, in the obscurity of the night, through streets filled with cavalry, meeting death at every step; scattered in small bodies, without officers to lead them, fighting for ten hours without food or clothes, in the depth of winter, yet recovering gradually every post, and ultimately forcing the enemy to a precipitate retreat.

On account of the important service rendered by the Irish major to the French cause, he was selected to carry the despatch to Paris. Louis accorded him an hour's private conference at Versailles, gave him his brevet as colonel, and a pension of a thousand livres, besides a present of a thousand louis-d'or to defray the expenses of his journey. From Versailles O'Mahony proceeded to St. Germains, where he was knighted by the Pretender, James III.

The gallantry displayed by the Irish in this affair occasioned the once favourite air, ‘The day we beat the Germans at Cremona.’ O'Mahony continued to serve in North Italy under Vendôme; he was appointed governor of Brescello upon its surrender on 28 July 1703, and in January 1704 he took part in Vendôme's successes at San Sebastian and Castel Novo de Bormida.

=== Spanish service ===
Early in 1704, however, O'Mahony left Italy. Efficient officers were urgently needed in the Spanish service, and Louis XIV consequently recommended the Irish colonel to his nephew, Philip V. A regiment was soon found for him, composed largely of deserters from the British expedition to Cadiz, and during the remainder of 1704 and the whole of 1705 O'Mahony made himself conspicuous under the Prince de Tilly by his services against the miquelets of the archduke's party. The picturesque details of his being circumvented by Peterborough at Murviedro early in 1706, drawn from Carleton's ‘Memoirs’ and Freind's ‘Relation of Peterborough's Services in Spain,’ are probably wholly fictitious. O'Mahony had at the time but a small force under his control, and was occupied in the transport of wounded soldiers, so that he probably had no alternative but to let Peterborough pass on his way to Valencia. If he had been culpable of such indiscretion as the story implies, he would hardly, as was the case, have been created maréchal de camp by Philip V in the course of this same spring.

Shortly after his promotion, O'Mahony stormed and sacked Enguera, and in June he bravely defended Alicante against Sir John Leake. Though the garrison was small, and the ramparts needed incessant repairs, he would have held out much longer than twenty-seven days had not the Neapolitans under his command forced the surrender by deliberately poisoning the wells. As it was, his troops marched out with the honours of war, and were transported to Cadiz without loss of service. The courtesy of General Gorges permitted a British surgeon to attend to the severe wound which O'Mahony received in the course of the defence.

Early in 1707, O'Mahony resumed his command in Valencia, and captured several towns from the allies. He also commanded a brigade of horse at the Battle of Almansa, and at the head of his Irish dragoons, according to Bellerive, performed astonishing actions. On 7 July he was again badly wounded at the siege of Denia. Before the close of 1707, however, he was again in command of some six thousand regular troops in Valencia, and he captured the important town of Alcoy on 2 January 1708 (Lafuente, Historia, xviii. 207).

In March 1709, he was appointed to the command of the Spanish forces in Sicily, comprising upwards of three thousand infantry, in addition to his regiment of Irish dragoons. He reached Messina in April, suppressed several Austrian conspiracies, and took such precautions as effectively prevented the English fleet from landing any of the allied forces. In 1710, he returned to Spain, where he was required to command the cavalry of the Gallo-Spanish army. On his return Philip promoted him lieutenant-general, and created him a Count of Castile. He subsequently served in the campaign of Ivaris, under the king, and on 20 August 1710 he commanded the Spanish cavalry at Saragossa. Placed upon the extreme right, he was opposed to the Portuguese horse, whom he utterly broke and drove into the Ebro; then, continuing his impetuous charge, he rode over the enemy's artillery, and, as he could not carry it off, cut the sinews of four hundred artillery mules. In the meantime the main body of Vendôme's army was in retreat, and O'Mahony had the utmost difficulty in rejoining. He was criticised for having carried his successful onslaught too far. He was, however, placed at the head of the cavalry at Villa Viciosa, and specially distinguished himself.

The Spanish king rewarded his valour by a commandership of the Order of St. Iago, producing a rent of fifteen thousand livres (Bacallar y Saña, Comentarios). O'Mahony pursued the retreating army into Aragon, and captured at the stronghold of Illueca Lieutenant-general Dom Antonio de Villaroel with a detachment of 660 men (Quincy, vi. 453). He continued to act in Spain under Vendôme until the cessation of hostilities in 1712. Before the end of that year, O'Mahony remarried Charlotte. O'Mahony had been ennobled by Louis XIV, and the marriage took place at St. Germains, where the bridegroom was warmly received by the court. He did not, however, long survive his second marriage, dying at Ocana in Spain in January 1714.

== Personal life ==
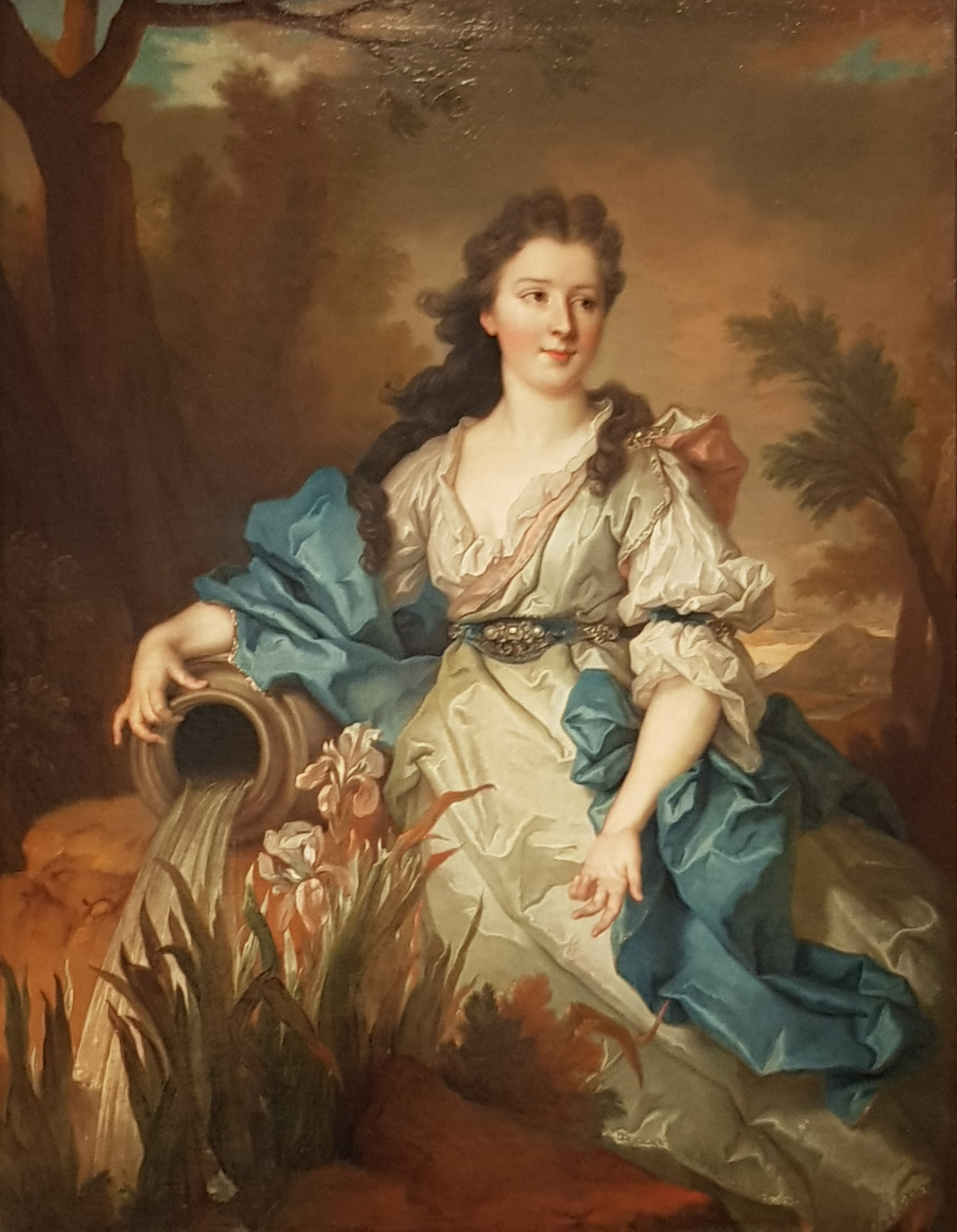
Portrait of his daughter, Mary Anne, as a Water Nymph, by the workshop of Nicolas de Largillierre (today in the Musée des Beaux-Arts de Tours)

O'Mahony was twice married. His first marriage was to Cecilia Weld, daughter of Bridget Thimblethorp of Lincolnshire and George Weld of the ancient Dorset family. Her paternal grandparents were Sir John Weld and Frances Whitmore (sister of Sir William and Sir George Whitmore). Before her death in c. 1708, they were the parents of:

- Honorée O'Mahoney, who married Irish Jacobite nobleman Capt. Cornelius O'Ryan of the Berwick regiment who was killed during the Battle of Almansa in 1707. They had several children born in Saint-Germain-en-Laye between 1695 and 1701.
- Lt.-Gen. James Joseph O'Mahony, Count Mahony (1699–1757), who rose to be a lieutenant-general in the Spanish service, governor of Fort St. Elmo, commander of the order of Saint Januarius, and inspector-general of cavalry in the Spanish kingdom of Naples; he married Lady Anne Clifford, daughter of Hon. Thomas Clifford (eldest surviving son and heir apparent of the 2nd Baron Clifford of Chudleigh) and Charlotte Maria Radclyffe, 3rd Countess of Newburgh, in 1739.
- Mary Anne O'Mahony (1701–1751), who married economist Richard Cantillon and had issue. After his death, she married her step-mother's brother, François Bulkeley, son of Hon. Henry Bulkeley and Sophia Stuart, in 1738.
- Demetrius (Dermod) O'Mahony (1702–1776), who became ambassador from Spain to Austria, and died at Vienna in 1776.
- Jean-Georges O'Mahony (b. 1704).

On 19 July 1712, Charlotte (née Bulkeley), Viscountess Clare, at Saint-Germain-en-Laye. The widow of Charles O'Brien, 5th Viscount Clare, she was daughter of Hon. Henry Bulkeley (son of the 1st Viscount Bulkeley) and Sophia Stuart (sister of the Duchess of Richmond, daughter of Dr. Walter Stewart and granddaughter of the 1st Lord Blantyre), and a sister of the Duchess of Berwick (wife of James FitzJames, 1st Duke of Berwick). From her first marriage, she had two sons, Charles O'Brien, 6th Viscount Clare, and Henry O'Brien.

The Count of Castile died at Ocana in Spain in January 1714. Neither of his sons left male descendants. A collateral descendant, who also held the title Count O'Mahony, commanded a regiment of dragoons at Barcelona in 1756.

=== Legacy ===
"Le fameux Mahoni," as he was called, to distinguish him from others of his family who had taken service under the Bourbons, was more than a dashing officer; he was an accomplished soldier, and Bellerive says of him with justice, "He was not only always brave, but laborious and indefatigable; his life was a continued chain of dangerous combats, desperate attacks, and honourable retreats" St. Simon says of O'Mahony that he was a man of wit as well as of valour; and Louis XIV assured De Chamillart, when O'Mahony was at Versailles in 1702, 'qu'il n'avait jamais vu personne rendre un si bon compte de tout, ni avec tant de netteté d'esprit et de justesse, même si agréablement.' When at the end of his first interview Louis observed, 'But you have said nothing of my brave Irish’ at Cremona, O'Mahony replied, 'They fought in conjunction with the other troops of your majesty.'

=== Descendants ===
Through his eldest son, he was a grandfather of Countess Cecilia Carlotta Francisca Anna Mahony, Countess Mahony (1740–1789), who married Prince Benedetto Giustiniani, 5th Prince of Bassano Romano and Duke of Corbara (d. 1793) in 1757.

Through his daughter Mary Anne, he was a grandfather of Henrietta Cantillon (1728–1761), who married William Stafford-Howard, 3rd Earl of Stafford (son of William Stafford-Howard, 2nd Earl of Stafford), in 1743. After his death, she married Robert Maxwell, 1st Earl of Farnham (a son of John Maxwell, 1st Baron Farnham), in 1759.
