= Boisard =

Boisard is a surname. Notable people with the surname include:

- Jean Boisard (died c. 1725), French numismatist
- Jean-François Boisard (c. 1762–1820), French painter and poet
- Jean-Jacques Boisard (1743–1831), French fabulist
- Marcel André Boisard (born 1939), Swiss diplomat

== See also ==
- Boissard
