= Henry Higgs =

British economist (1864–1940)

Henry Higgs (4 March 1864 – 21 May 1940) was a British civil servant, economist, and historian of economic thought.

Higgs joined the War Office as a Lower Division Clerk in 1882. From there he moved to the Postmaster General's Office in 1884 when he also began taking courses at University College London. He received an LLB degree at the latter in 1890. He went to Treasury in 1899. Following the end of the Second Boer War in June 1902, Higgs travelled to Natal to examine the working of the Civil Service of that colony on behalf of its government. He stayed in South Africa for six months from October 1902 until late Spring 1903. He was appointed Private Secretary of then-Prime Minister Henry Campbell-Bannerman in 1905 serving for three years before returning to Treasury in 1908.

Higgs was a founding member of the British Economic Association in 1890 and contributed to securing a Royal Charter for it in 1902, which was followed by a name change to the Royal Economic Society. He was Secretary for the organization from 1892 to 1905 and assistant editor of The Economic Journal from 1896 to 1905 during the tenure of F.Y. Edgeworth as editor.

Among other subjects, Higgs wrote on the economist Richard Cantillon and edited what became the standard version of Cantillon's Essai sur la nature du commerce en général. He also wrote on the Physiocrats, the financial system of the United Kingdom, and financial reform. He also compiled a historical bibliography on economic thought. J.M. Keynes in his obituary of Higgs (The Economic Journal, 1940) explains that "the unfinished volumes of the Economic Bibliography, were based on [H. S.] Foxwell's collections, which Higgs edited for a Joint Committee, under the chairmanship of W.R. Scott, representing the British Academy, the RES and the Goldsmiths' Company, each of which contributed to the substantial expense. This was a laborious work to which Higgs gave the bulk of his time in his last years, but it was work done at a time when he was no longer reliable in the small, often unimportant, points of accurate detail which are nevertheless the essence of such a project. It was a task, not really suited to his gifts, undertaken out of loyalty and affection to Foxwell with the pious oblject of harvesting some part of the labours and scholarship which Foxwell's own temperament never allowed him to garner himself."

Higgs was an early supporter of and contributor to Dictionary of Political Economy, Inglis Palgrave, ed., (1894, ..., 1908), to which he contributed 19 entries. He edited the only edition of the Dictionary not edited by Palgrave, adding Palgrave's name to the title and penning 40 more entries .
