= Thomazine Carew =

English courtier

Thomazine or Thomasina or Thomasine Carew was an English courtier.

== Career ==
Thomazine Goldolphin was a daughter of Francis Godolphin and his first wife Margaret Killigrew.

In 1588 she married George Carew (d. 1612), a son of Thomas Carew of Antony.

According to Dudley Carleton, Carew rode north to meet Anne of Denmark, wife of James VI, in June 1603, in an unsuccessful attempt to gain an office in her household.

Thomazine Carew, however, was appointed a lady-in-waiting to Anne of Denmark. The queen gave her gifts of clothes she had worn, including in February 1610 at Whitehall Palace, a black satin gown in a plain bias cut, and another black gown with blue "galloons" or lace strips. Lady Carew walked in the procession at Anne of Denmark's funeral in 1619 as a lady of the Privy Chamber.

Lady Carew was influential by her proximity to Anne of Denmark, and was able to forward her husband's plans. Thomas Edmondes wrote that she had intervened in his diplomatic appointments against his wishes, but the Lord Treasurer Robert Cecil's decision had prevailed.

As her husband had been ambassador in France from 1605 to 1609, she was sometimes known as "French lady Cary". There were discussions that the widowed "French Lady Cary" would marry Sir William Clarke (d. 1624).

The date of her death seems to be unknown. She outlived her son.

== Marriage and children ==
Her children included:

- Francis Carew (died 1628).
- Louisa Carew, who married John Houston.
- Sophia Carew, a maid of honour at court who performed in the masque The Shepherd's Paradise.She married (1) Richard Neville, (2) Walter Stewart, and was the mother of Frances Stewart, Duchess of Richmond.

In 1654 Louisa Houston petitioned Oliver Cromwell for a pension after the death of her mother.
