= Adéodat =

Adéodat is a given name.

== People with the given name ==
- Adéodat Boissard (1870–1938), French politician
- Adéodat Compère-Morel (1872–1941), French politician
- Joseph-Adéodat Blanchette (1893–1968), Canadian politician
