= George Carew (diplomat) =

English diplomat and historian (1556–1612)

- Died: 13 November 1612
- Occupation: Diplomat

Sir George Carew (~1556-13 November 1612) was an English diplomat, historian and Member of Parliament.

== Life ==
He was the second son of Thomas Carew of Antony and brother of Richard Carew. He was educated at Oxford and entered the Middle Temple before travelling abroad. At the recommendation of Queen Elizabeth I, who conferred on him the honour of a knighthood, he was appointed secretary to Sir Christopher Hatton. Later, having been promoted to a Mastership in Chancery, he was sent as ambassador to the King of Poland to address trade issues raised during Polish ambassador Paweł Działyński's visit to England in 1597. On his return, he spoke with Elizabeth directly and then wrote a report, De rebus Sueciae et Poloniae, now part of MS 250 at Lambeth Library, a transcription of which is available.

He sat in Parliament for rotten boroughs St. Germans in 1584, for Saltash in 1586, 1588, 1593, and for St. Germans in 1597 and 1601.

The honour of knighthood was conferred upon him at the Palace of Whitehall on 23 July 1603. According to John Chamberlain, "Mr Carew, a master in chancery" rode north to Edinburgh to meet James VI and I in March 1603 at the Union of the Crowns, in an unsuccessful attempt to gain an office. He rode to Scotland again in June 1603 to meet Anne of Denmark, but did not get his desired "special place about her".

He died of typhus on November 13, 1612, and was buried the next day at St Margaret's Church, Westminster.

== Family ==
He married Thomazine Carew, the daughter of Sir Francis Godolphin and his first wife Margaret Killigrew. They had two sons and three daughters, including:

- Francis Carew, son and heir.
- Louisa Carew, who married John Houston.
- Sophia Carew, a maid of honour at court who performed in the masque The Shepherd's Paradise. She married (1) Richard Neville, son of Christopher Neville of Newton St Loe, (2) Walter Stewart, a son of Walter Stewart, 1st Lord Blantyre. She was the mother of Frances Stewart, Duchess of Richmond.

=== Lady Carew at court ===
Thomazine, or Thomasine, Lady Carew, was a lady-in-waiting to Anne of Denmark. The queen gave her gifts of clothes she had worn, including in February 1610 at Whitehall Palace, a black satin gown in a plain bias cut, and another black gown with blue "galloons" or lace strips.

George Carew, 1st Earl of Totnes, a distant relation of her husband, was the queen's receiver-general and vice-chamberlain, which can be a source of confusion.

Lady Carew was influential by her proximity to Anne of Denmark, and was able to forward her husband's plans. Thomas Edmondes wrote in 1610 that she had attempted to have Carew replace him as Ambassador to France, but the Lord Treasurer Robert Cecil's decision had prevailed. She walked in the procession at Anne of Denmark's funeral in 1619 as a lady of the Privy Chamber.

== Writings ==
During the reign of James I he was employed in negotiations with Scotland and for several years was ambassador to the court of France. On his return, he wrote a Relation of the State of France, written in the classical style of the Elizabethan age and featuring sketches of the leading persons at the court of Henry IV. It appears as an appendix to Thomas Birch's Historical View of the Negotiations between the Courts of England, France and Brussels, from 1592 to 1617, 1749. (Note: Full title: An historical view of the negotiations between the courts of England, France, and Brussels, from the year 1592 to 1617: Extracted chiefly from the MS. State-Papers of Sir Thomas Edmondes, Knt. Ambassador in France, and at Brussels, and Treasurer of the Household to the Kings James I. and Charles I. and of Anthony Bacon, Esq; brother to the Lord Chancellor Bacon. To which is added, a relation of the state of France, with the characters of Henry IV. and the principal persons of the court, drawn up by Sir George Carew, upon his return from his Embassy there in 1609, and addressed to King James I. Never before printed. London: for A. Millar.) The work A Relation of the State of Polonia, produced between 1598 and 1603, used to be attributed to Carew, but in 2014 Sobecki definitively identified John Peyton as the author and the coronation of James VI and I in 1603 as the date of completion. Sobecki's identification is based on Peyton's letters about this work and the finding of a second copy of A Relation of the State of Polonia written in Peyton's hand and dated and signed by Peyton himself.
