= Sophia Bulkeley =

Scottish Jacobite courtier (1660–1718)

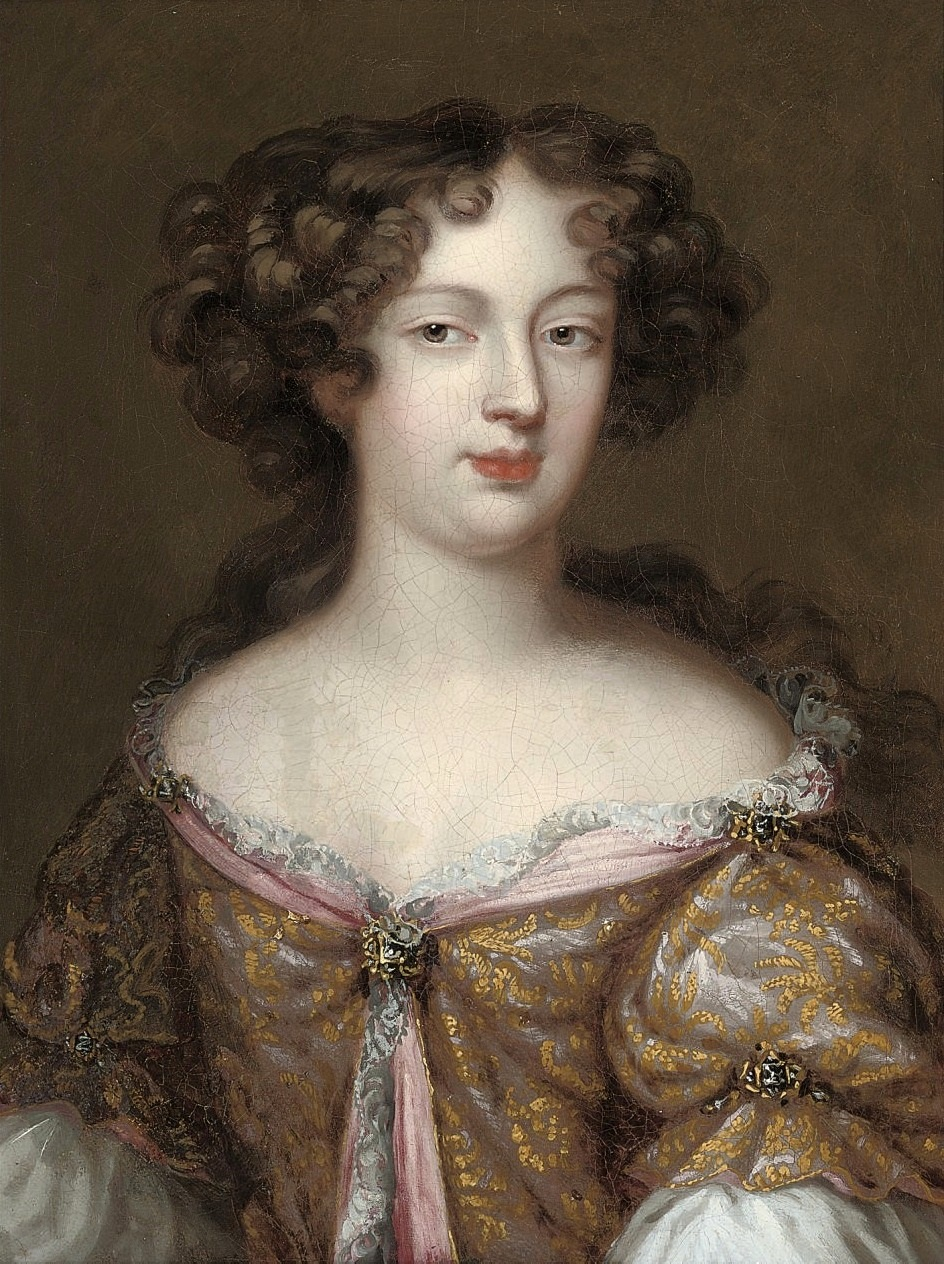
- Sophia Bulkeley, portrait by Henri Gascar.
- Born: Sophia Stuart c. 1648; Blantyre, Lanarkshire, Scotland
- Died: c. 1718; France
- Occupations: Maid of honour, courtier
- Political party: Jacobite
- Spouse: Henry Bulkeley
- Children: François de Bulkeley; Charlotte, Countess O'Mahony; Anne FitzJames, Duchess of Berwick
- Parent(s): Walter Stuart; Sophia Stuart
- Relatives: Frances Stewart, Duchess of Richmond (sister)

Sophia Bulkeley (née Stewart; fl. 1660 – 1718) was a Scottish Jacobite courtier in France.

== Early life ==
She was a younger daughter of Walter Stewart (or Stuart), the third son of Walter Stewart, 1st Lord Blantyre, M.P. for Monmouth, her elder sister being the court beauty Frances Stewart, Duchess of Richmond. The Stuarts were royalists, and were in exile in France under the Commonwealth.

== Court life ==
Sophia returned to England after the Restoration of 1660, and in 1671 became a maid of honour to Queen Catherine of Braganza. About three years later she married Hon. Henry Bulkeley, which placed Sophia in the inner court circles, and, in due course in 1685, she became Dame du Palais to Queen Mary of Modena.

About 1680 it was rumoured that Sidney Godolphin was enamoured of her. In October 1688 she was a witness with Queen Mary at the birth of her son, the young James, Prince of Wales. The Glorious Revolution saw her move with the Queen and Stuart court to France in December 1688.

Sophia remained a Jacobite loyalist, though she had personal reasons to return on occasion to England, something she managed in 1702. She tried to return again to England in 1713, on financial affairs, but was refused papers. She made a final attempt in 1718, which once more failed.

== Personal life ==
Around 1673, she married Hon. Henry Bulkeley, the fourth son of Thomas Bulkeley, 1st Viscount Bulkeley of Baron Hill, near Beaumaris, and brother of the royalist general Richard Bulkeley. Henry was master of the household successively to Charles II and James II. Henry and Sophia Bulkeley had six children, including:

- Anne Bulkeley (1673–1751), who married James FitzJames, 1st Duke of Berwick, illegitimate son of James II, with whom she had eight sons and five daughters.
- Charlotte Bulkeley (b. c. 1678), who married Charles O'Brien, 5th Viscount Clare. After his death, she married Count Daniel O'Mahony.
- François de Bulkeley (1686–1756), a Lieutenant-general; who married Marie-Anne O'Mahony, widow of Richard Cantillon and daughter of Count Daniel O'Mahony and Cecilia Weld.
