= Governor Stuart =

Governor Stuart may refer to:

- Edwin Sydney Stuart (1853–1937), 24th Governor of Pennsylvania
- Henry Carter Stuart (1855–1933), 47th Governor of Virginia
- James Stuart (British Army officer, born 1741) (1741–1815), 2nd Military Governor of British Ceylon from 1796 to 1797
- Patrick Stuart (British Army officer, born 1777) (1777–1855), Governor of Malta 1843–47

== See also ==
- Governor Stewart (disambiguation)
