= Boissard =

Boissard is a surname. Notable people with the surname include:

- Adéodat Boissard (1870–1938), French politician
- Jean-Jacques Boissard (1528–1602), French antiquary and poet
- José Miguel Boissard (born 1978), Dominican judoka

== See also ==
- Boisard
