= William Stuart (British Army officer) =

British Army officer

Lieutenant-General The Honourable William Stuart CB
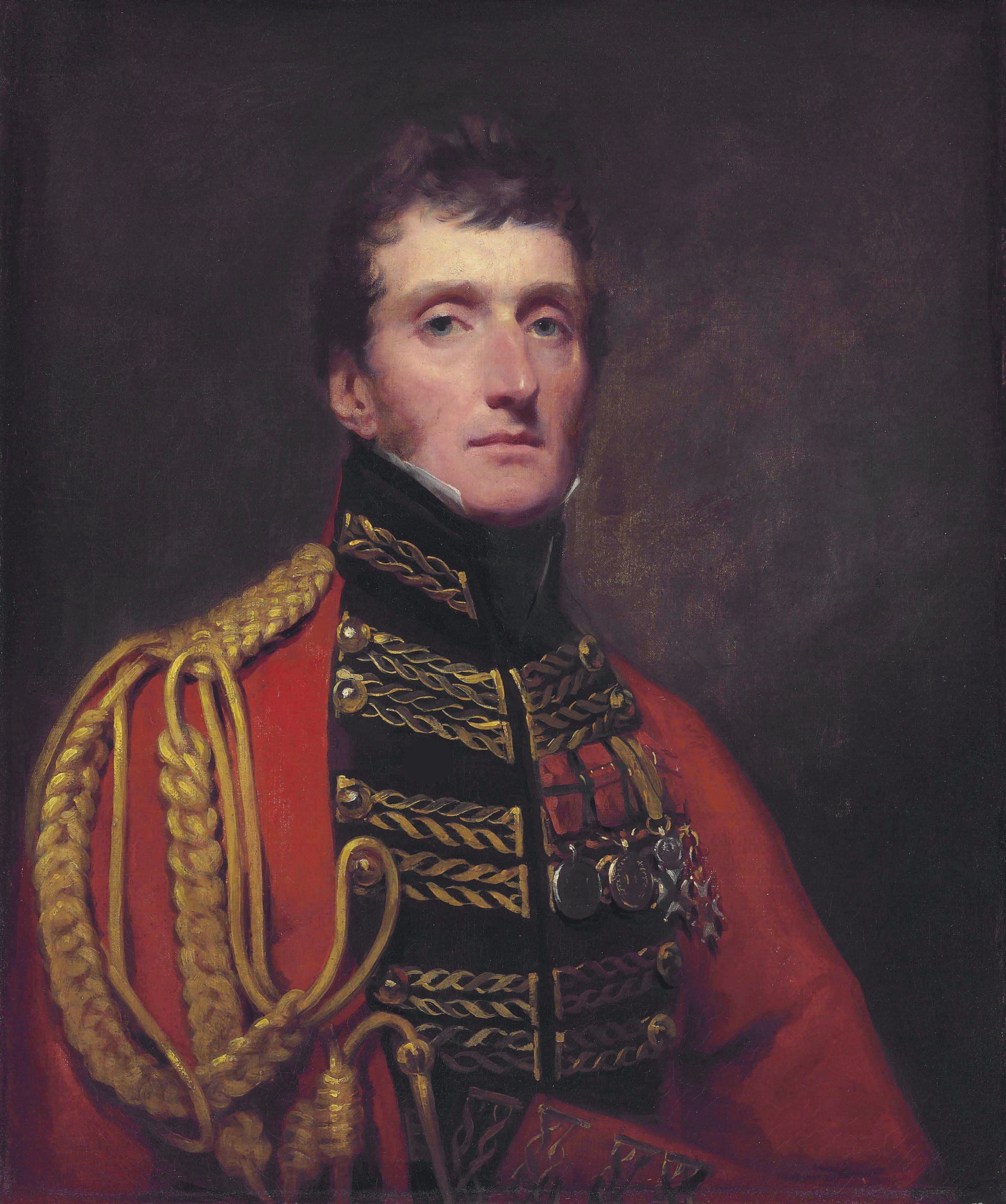
- Portrait by Sir Henry Raeburn
- Born: 20 August 1778; Erskine, Scotland
- Died: 15 February 1837 (aged 61); Erskine, Scotland
- Burial place: Erskine Churchyard
- Alma mater: Winchester College
- Relatives: Robert Stuart, 11th Lord Blantyre (brother); Sir Patrick Stuart (brother)
- Military career
- Allegiance: United Kingdom
- Branch: British Army
- Service years: 1794–1837
- Rank: Lieutenant-General
- Unit: 1st Foot Guards
- Conflicts: French Revolutionary Wars; Irish Rebellion of 1798; Anglo-Russian invasion of Holland; Walcheren Campaign; Napoleonic Wars; Peninsular War; Battle of the Pyrenees; Battle of the Bidassoa; Battle of Nivelle; Battle of the Nive; Passage of the Adour; Battle of Bayonne; Hundred Days; Battle of Quatre Bras (WIA)
- Memorials: Royal Military Chapel (destroyed 1944)

Lieutenant-General William Stuart, CB (1778–1837) was a British Army officer who fought in the Napoleonic Wars.

== Early life ==
The Hon. William Stuart was born in 1778 into Scottish nobility. He was the third son of Alexander Stuart, 10th Lord Blantyre and Catharine, eldest daughter and heiress of Patrick Lindsay of Eaglescairnie, Haddingtonshire. His elder brothers were the twins Robert Stuart, 11th Lord Blantyre and Sir Patrick Stuart. All three brothers achieved prominence in the British Army in their own right.

== Career ==
Stuart was appointed ensign in the 1st Guards in 1794, a lieutenant and captain in 1797. In 1798 he served in Ireland during the Rebellion with the 3rd battalion. In 1799 he accompanied the Battalion in the Anglo-Russian invasion of Holland, and was present in the actions of the 27 August, on 10, 19 September and 2 October. In July 1806 he went to Sicily, and returned in January 1808. In 1807 be attained the rank of Captain and Lieutenant-Colonel. In 1809 he served in the expedition to Walcheren.

Stuart afterwards served in the Peninsular War and received a medal for the Battle of the Nive. In 1814 he attained the rank of colonel in the army and was appointed third Major of the Grenadier Guards. He was commanding officer of the 3rd Battalion, 1st Regiment of Guards during the Waterloo Campaign. He fought at the battle of Quatre Bras where he was wounded, and may have lost his arm as a result of that wound, "although an old label on the reverse of the present painting suggests that he received that injury at Waterloo". He was promoted to Major-General on 19 July 1821, and Lieutenant-General some time after that.

== Personal life ==
Stuart died unmarried at Erskine House, Renfrewshire, aged 58 on 15 February 1837.
