= Governor Stewart =

Governor Stewart may refer to:

- Duncan Stewart (British diplomat) (1904–1949), 2nd Governor of Sarawak in 1949
- John Wolcott Stewart (1825–1915), 33rd Governor of Vermont
- Robert Marcellus Stewart (1815–1871), 14th Governor of Missouri
- Sam V. Stewart (1872–1939), 6th Governor of Montana

== See also ==
- Governor Stuart (disambiguation)
