= Patrick Stuart (British Army officer, born 1777) =

British Army officer (1777–1855)

General Sir Patrick Stuart GCMG
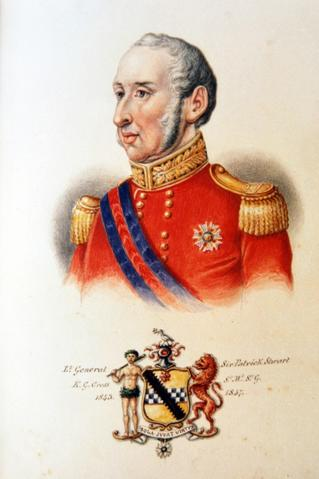
- Born: 10 June 1777; Edinburgh, Midlothian, Scotland
- Died: 7 February 1855 (aged 77); Haddington, East Lothian, Scotland
- Relatives: Robert Stuart, 11th Lord Blantyre (twin brother); William Stuart (brother)
- Military career
- Allegiance: United Kingdom
- Branch: British Army
- Rank: General
- Conflicts: Napoleonic Wars
- Awards: Knight Grand Cross of the Order of St Michael and St George

General Sir Patrick Stuart, GCMG (10 June 1777 – 7 February 1855) was a British Army officer who served as Governor of Malta between 1843 and 1847.

== Military career ==
Stuart, the second son of the 10th Lord Blantyre, was commissioned into the 2nd Regiment of Life Guards in 1794. He became a inspecting field officer of the militia in the Ionian Islands in 1816. He went on to be Commander-in-Chief, Scotland in 1830 (and from 1836, Governor of Edinburgh Castle) and Governor of Malta in 1843 before retiring in 1847.

He served as the Colonel of the 44th (East Essex) Regiment of Foot from 1843 until his death and was promoted to full general in 1851.

He married Catherine Rodney, a granddaughter of Admiral Lord Rodney.

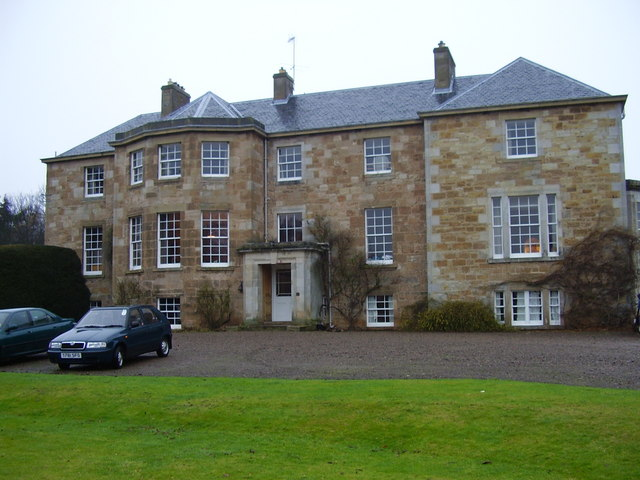
Eaglescairnie House, Haddingtonshire: home of Sir Patrick Stuart

He died at his home, Eaglescairnie House, near Haddington in East Lothian, on 7 February 1855. His will is in the National Archives.

Military offices
Preceded by Sir Robert O'Callaghan	Commander-in-Chief, Scotland; 1830–1837	Succeeded by Lord Greenock
Preceded by The Duke of Gordon	Governor of Edinburgh Castle; 1836–1837	Succeeded by Lord Greenock
Preceded by Gore Browne	Colonel of the 44th (East Essex) Regiment of Foot; 1843–1855	Succeeded by Sir Frederick Ashworth
Government offices
Preceded by Sir Henry Bouverie	Governor of Malta; 1843–1847	Succeeded by Richard More O'Ferrall
