= Charles Stuart, 12th Lord Blantyre =

Scottish landowner

Arms of Stuart, Lord Blantyre

Charles Stuart, 12th Lord Blantyre, DL (21 December 1818 – 15 December 1900), styled Master of Blantyre from birth until 1830, was a Scottish nobleman and landowner with 14,100 acres (57 km^{2}) of titled lands.

Born at Lennoxlove House, he was the second son of Maj.-Gen. Robert Stuart, 11th Lord Blantyre and his wife Frances Mary, the second daughter of the Hon. John Rodney, younger son of Admiral George Brydges Rodney, 1st Baron Rodney. In 1830 at the age of only twelve, he succeeded his father as Lord Blantyre. Stuart entered the British Army and was commissioned into the Grenadier Guards. He was appointed a Deputy Lieutenant of Renfrewshire in 1845 and was elected a Scottish representative peer in 1850.

On 4 October 1843 at Trentham, Staffordshire, Blantyre married Lady Evelyn, the second daughter of George Sutherland-Leveson-Gower, 2nd Duke of Sutherland, and had by her five daughters and a son, Walter, who predeceased him.

- Hon. Mary Stuart (15 September 1845 – 21 November 1910), unmarried.
- Hon. Ellen Stuart (31 August 1846 –19 April 1927), who married Sir David Baird, 3rd Baronet and together had six children. Their son inherited the Blantyre estates in 1900.
- Hon. Evelyn Stuart (24 June 1848 – 26 July 1888), who married Archibald Kennedy, 3rd Marquess of Ailsa. They had five children.
- Hon. Gertrude Stuart (11 November 1849 – 25 April 1935), married William Henry Gladstone MP, son of Prime Minister William Ewart Gladstone. They had two daughters, and one son, William Glynne Charles Gladstone.
- Capt. Hon. Walter Stuart, Master of Blantyre (17 July 1851 – 15 March 1895), unmarried. After expeditions in North America, he settled at Glenelg. A renowned figure in the Highlands, he predeceased his father without issue. A biography, The Master of Blantyre (1895) by Catherine Marsh, was published in his honour.
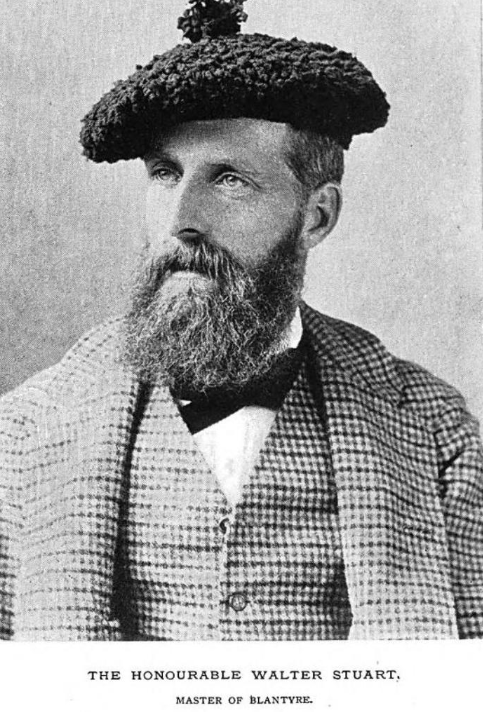
  Walter Stuart, Master of Blantyre

Lord Blantyre's wife died in Nice in 1869 and he survived her until 1900, dying aged 81 at Erskine House, which subsequently became Erskine Hospital (now a hotel, renamed Mar Hall). The Lordship of Blantyre became extinct on his death.

== See also ==
- Clan Stewart
- Lord Blantyre

Peerage of Scotland
Preceded by Robert Walter Stuart	Lord Blantyre; 1830–1900	Extinct
