= Prior of Blantyre =

The Prior of Blantyre (later Commendator of Blantyre) was the head of the medieval community of Augustinian canons based at Blantyre Priory (in modern South Lanarkshire). It was founded between 1239 and 1248, but the first prior is not known by name until 1296. Few of the priors are known thereafter until records become more extensive in the 16th century. The following is a list of known priors and commendators:

== List of priors ==
- William de Cokeburne, 1296–1304
- John de Eglinton, 1380–1381
- William Forfare, 1430
- William Fressell, 1451
- William Bassindene, 1451 - c. 1472
- John Cavers, 1472
- John Bassindene, 1472–1476
- John Turnbull, 1476
- William Busby, x 1489
- William Bell, 1489–1508
- John Aitkenhead, 1506
- Robert Cottis, 1508–1536
- John Cessford, 1509–1512
- William Cottis, 1536
- Robert Cottis junior, 1534–1536
- James Salmond, 1536–1545
- John Donaldi (mac Donald/Donaldson), 1538–1541
- John Moncreif, 1538–1547
- Thomas Hugonis, x 1543
- John Roull, 1547–1549
- John Hamilton, 1549–1552
- William Chrysyde (Chrinside), 1552–1567
- John Hamilton, 1567

== List of commendators ==
- Walter Stewart, 1577–1599

== Bibliography ==
- Cowan, Ian B. & Easson, David E., Medieval Religious Houses: Scotland With an Appendix on the Houses in the Isle of Man, Second Edition, (London, 1976), p. 89
- Watt, D.E.R. & Shead, N.F. (eds.), The Heads of Religious Houses in Scotland from the 12th to the 16th Centuries, The Scottish Records Society, New Series, Volume 24, (Edinburgh, 2001), pp. 21–4

== See also ==
- Blantyre Priory
- Lord Blantyre
