= Robert Stuart, 11th Lord Blantyre =

British Army officer (died 1830)

The Right Honourable The Lord Blantyre CB
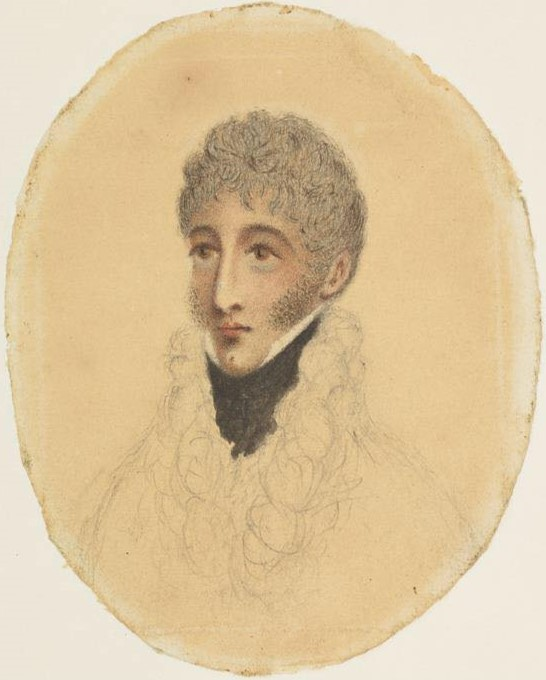
- Portrait by Ellen Sharples
- Born: 10 June 1777; Edinburgh
- Died: 23 September 1830 (aged 53); Brussels
- Alma mater: Eton College
- Spouse: Frances Rodney (m. 1813)
- Children: 11, including: Charles Stuart, 12th Lord Blantyre; Sir William Stuart; Caroline Stuart, Countess of Seafield
- Military career
- Allegiance: United Kingdom
- Branch: British Army
- Service years: 1795–1830
- Commands: 2nd Battalion, 42nd Regiment of Foot; 2nd Brigade, 1st Division
- Conflicts: French Revolutionary Wars; Anglo-Russian Invasion of Holland; Egypt campaign; Napoleonic Wars; Copenhagen campaign; Peninsular War; Battle of Bussaco; Battle of Fuentes de Oñoro; Siege of Ciudad Rodrigo
- Awards: Army Gold Medal; Military Order of the Tower and Sword (Portugal)

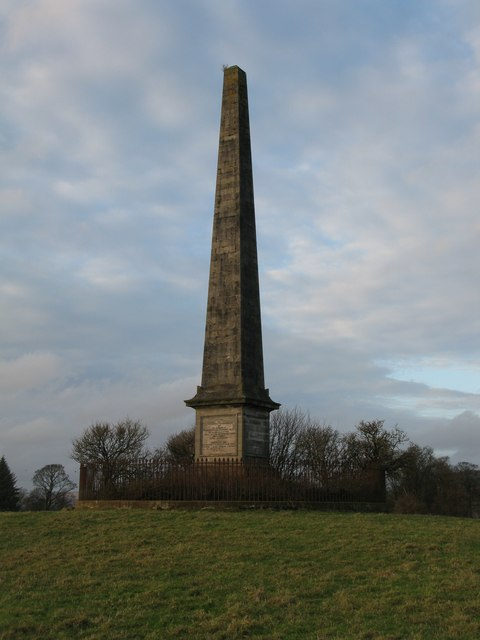
The Blantyre Monument at Erskine, commemorating General Lord Blantyre

Major-General Robert Walter Stuart, 11th Lord Blantyre CB (10 June 1777 – 23 September 1830) was a British Army officer who served throughout the French Revolutionary and Napoleonic Wars. He was Lord Lieutenant of Renfrewshire between 1820 and 1822, and was appointed a Scottish representative peer between 1806 and 1807.

== Biography ==
=== Early life ===
Robert Walter Stuart was born in Edinburgh in 1777, the son of Alexander Stuart, 10th Lord Blantyre and his wife the Catharine née Lindsay. His brothers were General Sir Patrick Stuart (twin), and Lieutenant-General William Stuart, both of whom also achieved success in the British Army. He succeeded his father as 11th Lord Blantyre, in the Peerage of Scotland, in 1783, aged 6. He was educated at Eton College.

In 1795, Lord Blantyre was commissioned as ensign in the 3rd Regiment of Foot (Scots Guards).

=== Military career ===
Blantyre fought with his regiment during the campaign in Holland in 1799. Transferred to the 31st Regiment of Foot, he was promoted to the rank of captain. He later transferred again, this time to the 7th Dragoons. He fought in the Egyptian campaign led by Lt.-Gen. Sir Ralph Abercromby. He fought in the Pomerania and Zealand campaign of 1807. He was promoted to Lieutenant Colonel in the 42nd Regiment of Foot. He was aide-de-camp to Lt.-Gen. Sir Charles Stuart.

Blantyre fought during the Peninsular war under the Duke of Wellington, and was noted for his bravery during the campaign. His records of that campaign are held in the National Archives.

He was appointed a Companion, Order of the Bath in 1815, and was promoted to the rank of Major General in 1819.

=== Death ===
Lord Blantyre was killed at Brussels on 23 September 1830 by a Belgian insurrectionist. He was shot by a musket ball when looking from the window of his hotel during the commotions at Brussels which comprised the Belgian Revolution. His death was deemed an accidental shooting. His will was proven by probate in January 1832, which bequeathed the Blantyre estates to his eldest son and successor, Charles.

== Family ==
Lord Blantyre married Frances Mary ('Fanny') Rodney (1791–1875), on 20 February 1813 at Edinburgh. She was the daughter of Captain John Rodney and Lady Catherine Nugent, and a granddaughter of Admiral George Brydges Rodney, 1st Baron Rodney. They had eleven children, of whom only seven survived infancy:

- Alexander Stuart, Master of Blantyre (1814–1814), died in infancy
- Catherine Stuart (1815–1872), married William Rashleigh, MP for East Cornwall
- Frances Mary Stuart (1816–1896)
- Charles Stuart, 12th Lord Blantyre (1818–1900), who succeeded, and married Lady Evelyn Sutherland-Leveson-Gower, daughter of the 2nd Duke of Sutherland
- Georgiana Elizabeth Stuart (1821–1904), married Sir Andrew Buchanan, 1st Baronet, without issue
- Sir William Stuart (1824–1896), diplomat
- Caroline Henrietta Stuart (1825–1825), died in infancy
- Walter Rodney Stuart (1826–1838), died in infancy
- Lieutenant-Colonel James Stuart (1827–1870), military officer
- Henry Stuart (1830–1842), twin, died in infancy
- Caroline Stuart (1830–1911), twin, married John Ogilvy-Grant, 7th Earl of Seafield, and was the mother of the 8th Earl of Seafield

== See also ==
- Clan Stewart
- Lord Blantyre

Honorary titles
Preceded by The Earl of Glasgow	Lord Lieutenant of Renfrewshire; 1820–1822	Succeeded by Sir Michael Shaw Stewart, Bt.
Peerage of Scotland
Preceded by Alexander Stuart	Lord Blantyre; 1783–1830	Charles Stuart
