= Marcel André Boisard =

Swiss diplomat (1939–2024)

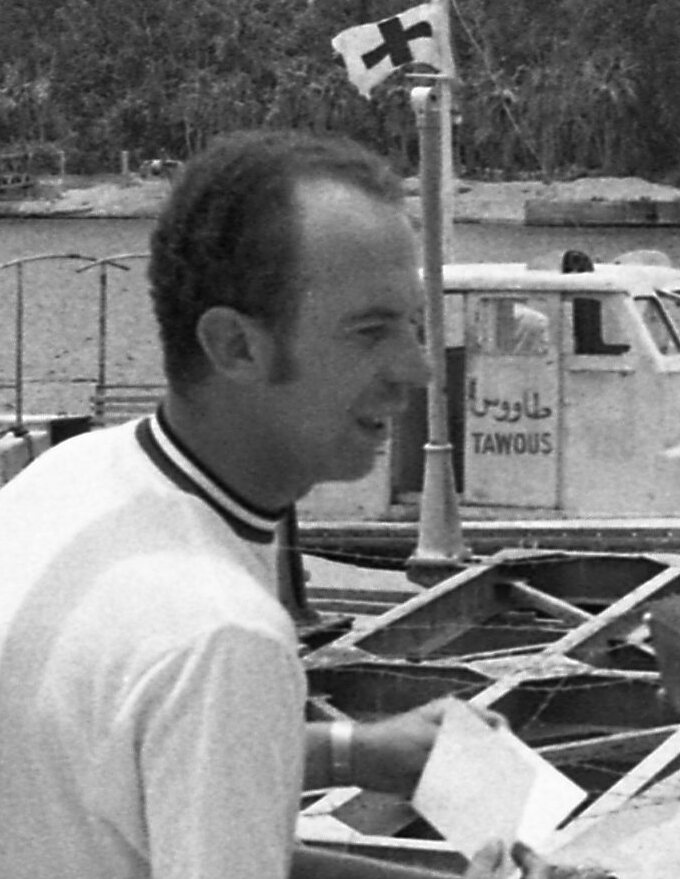
Marcel André Boisard, 1969

Marcel A. Boisard (14 July 1939 – 7 April 2024) was a Swiss intellectual and diplomat.

== Biography ==
Boisard completed his studies in Switzerland, Germany and the United States and obtained his PhD from the Graduate Institute of International Studies.

Boisard started his international career in early 1960s with the Swiss Federal Department of Foreign Affairs. He was recruited by the Government of Burundi for conducting negotiations with the European Economic Community, within the framework of Yaoundé Convention on Europe-Africa Association. Appointed Chairman of the African experts, he participated in numerous meetings. At different times of his career and at different levels of responsibilities, Boisard served the International Committee of the Red Cross (ICRC), exclusively as delegate in the field and during armed conflicts: Algeria, Yemen, the Arab Republic of Egypt, Syria, Jordan and Saudi Arabia. He was often called upon to cross the front lines between the belligerent parties and negotiate cease-fire and humanitarian truces. He had to watch over the application of the Geneva Conventions for the protection of wounded military, prisoners of war and civilian populations in armed conflicts of the Middle-East. He participated in the release of the royal family of Yemen and the repatriation of Egyptian prisoners in 1963, he organized the simultaneous repatriation of Israeli prisoners and agents and Egyptian prisoners of the Six-Day war, in 1968, and he negotiated, in September 1970, the liberation of Western hostages hijacked to Dawson’s Field airport in Jordan.

In 1975, he was appointed Research Fellow of the Graduate Institute of International Studies. Beside lecturing and conducting a research programme on East-West relations, Boisard published rather extensively: over 30 titles (books and articles), dealing mainly with cross-cultural relations, Muslim and Arab worlds, multilateral negotiations and inter-governmental organizations.

Quote from the Book review of Foreign Affairs of Fall 1979, on L’Humanisme de l’Islam : “Knowledge, understanding, and a broad view mark this work, which is both an exposition of the history and values of Islam and a plea for the extension of current concepts of international law and relations to reflect the diversity of the world’s cultures and religions”. The book has been the subject of a dissertation by Ms. Roberta Mendola, at the Faculty of Foreign Languages and Literature of the University of Genova, Italy, in 2008.

In 1980, he joined the United Nations. In 1992, he was appointed Executive Director of the United Nations Institute for Training and Research (UNITAR). In 2001, he became Assistant Secretary-General of the United Nations. UNITAR is one of the primary training providers in the field of multilateral diplomacy and economic and social development. Each year, the Institute was at the time organizing over 200 programmes for the benefit of some 30,000 persons. They benefited some 100 States, including some rather "closed" nations, such as the Democratic and Popular Republic of Korea, the Libyan Jamahiriya, Myanmar, etc... Boisard was known for advocating diplomacy in place of military solutions, and internal solutions in place of imposed external solutions, in conflict zones such as the Niger Delta. He relinquished his functions in February 2007.

After then, he published extensively in newspapers with large international audiences and in specialised reviews. His last book, entitled "Une si belle illusion; réécrire la Charte des Nations Unies", has been well received. Quote from the Review Choisir: "Far from being a severe manual, the book is pleasant to read and stimulates the intelligence and the sensitivity of the readers".

Marcel André Boisard was bestowed with the Order of Merit of the Arab Republic of Egypt, by late President Anwar Sadat.

Boisard died on 7 April 2024, at the age of 84.

== Selected works ==
- Marcel A. Boisard: L’Humanisme de l’Islam, Paris, 1979, 436 pages (« Prix franco-arabe »), four reprints. Translated into English (1988), Arabic (1981), German (1982), Persian (1979), Indonesian (1981, reprint 2003) and partly in Portuguese (1981).
- Marcel A. Boisard: L’Islam aujourd’hui, Paris, (UNESCO),1985, 279 pages. Translated into Arabic
- Marcel A. Boisard : De l’influence vraisemblable de la civilisation arabo-musulane sur les « fondateurs du droit international », Geneva 1985. Translated into Arabic and Turkish.
- Marcel A. Boisard : Guide pratique à l’attention des collaborateurs du CICR en terres d’Islam. Geneva 1989, 198 pages
- In Studia Diplomatica : Une politique européenne de la culture : l’art de l’impossible ? 1977. Translated in English.
- In Relations Internationales : Les accords de Camp David à l’épreuve de sionisme et du pan-arabisme, 1979
- In Der unbekannte Islam, Cologne 1982 : Die islamische Vorstellung vom Staat.
- In International Journal of Islam and Arabic Studies, Bloomington USA, 1984: Islam and the West: Towards a True Cultural Dialogue ?
- In Weltmach Islam, Munich 1988 : Eine Geschichte von globalem Ausmass.
- Boisard, M.A. and November, A.: Répertoire des principales institutions s’intéressant à l’Afrique noire. Genève 1964
- Contribution to Freymond, J. : Les hommes d’Etat célèbres de 1920 à nos jours, Paris 1977
- Boisard, M.A. and Chossudovsky, E.M.: The United Nations System at Geneva: Scope and Practices of Multilateral Diplomacy and Cooperation. Geneva 1992, 484 pages. Second revised edition by J.Lemoine. Geneva, 1998, 504 pages
- Boisard, M.A.: Une si belle illusion; Réécrire la Charte des Nations Unies, Paris, Editions du Panthéon, 2018, 466 pages
