= Adéodat Boissard =

French politician

- Born: 11 December 1870; Aix-en-Provence, Bouches-du-Rhône, France
- Died: 31 January 1938 (aged 67); Paris, France
- Occupation: Politician
- Spouse: Jeanne Royer
- Children: 6

Adéodat Boissard (1870–1938) was a French politician. He served as a member of the Chamber of Deputies from 1919 to 1924, representing Côte-d'Or.

== Biography ==
Born into a long line of magistrates from Dijon, Adéodat Emmanuel Joseph Jean Jacques Boissard was born on December 11, 1870, in Aix-en-Provence, where his father Henri Boissard served as attorney general at the court of appeals from 1867 to 1872. He was one of 14 out of 27 attorneys general who were transferred or dismissed in 1879.

Adéodat Boissard received his doctorate in law in 1896. He began his career as a professor at the Faculty of Law in Lille, then went on to teach at the Catholic University of Paris from 1906 to 1931. His main areas of interest were social law and labor legislation.

He was one of the founders and secretary general of the Semaines sociales in 1904.

The Académie Française awarded him the Fabien Prize in 1911 for his work Contrat de travail et salariat (Employment Contract and Wage Labor).

Mobilized in 1914 as a lieutenant in the territorial infantry, he was sent to the front at his own request, where his conduct earned him a commendation from his regiment in December 1915.

He was a member of parliament for Côte-d'Or from 1919 to 1924, registered with the Democratic and Republican Union group.

In 1893, he married Jeanne Royer (1871–1966), the third daughter of Édith Royer, in Quincy-le-Vicomte, with whom he had six children (including Adéodat Boissard, governor of Crédit Foncier de France and father of Janine Boissard).
