= Essay on the Nature of Trade in General =

1755 economics text by Richard Cantillon

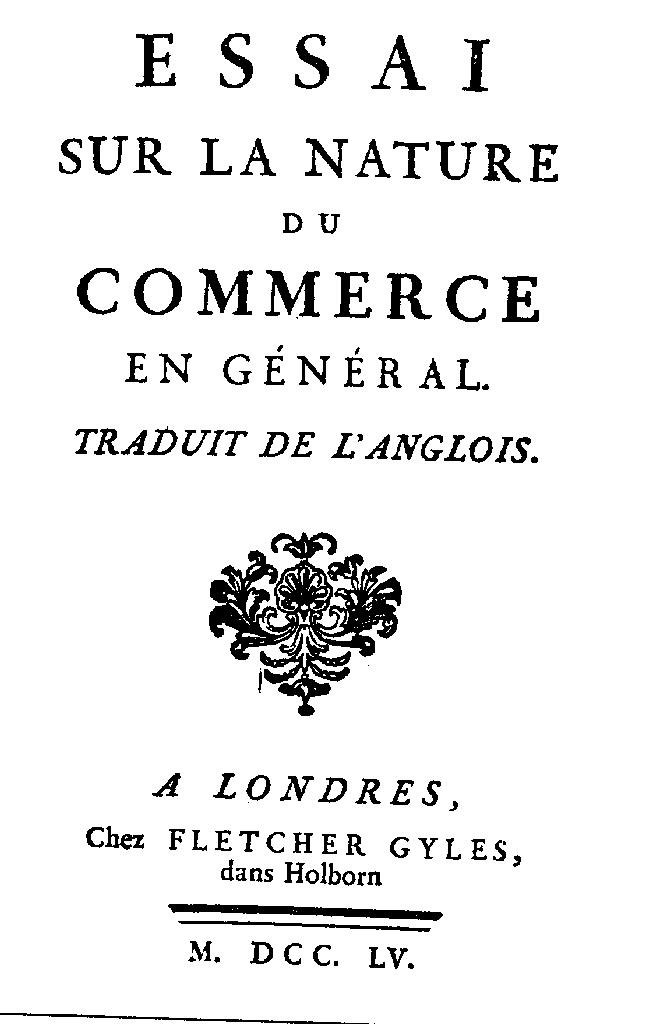
- French translation
- Author: Richard Cantillon
- Language: English
- Subject: Political economy
- Publisher: 1755
- Publication place: Ireland

Essay on the Nature of Trade in General is a book about economics by Richard Cantillon written around 1730, and published in French in 1755. This book was considered by William Stanley Jevons to be the "cradle of political economy".

== Composition and circulation ==
This work remains Cantillon's only surviving contribution to economics. It was written around 1730 and circulated widely in manuscript form, but was not published until 1755. His work was translated into Spanish by Gaspar Melchor de Jovellanos, probably in the late 1770s, and considered essential reading for political economy. Despite having much influence on the early development of the physiocrat and classical schools of thought, this work was largely forgotten until its rediscovery by Jevons in the late 19th century. Cantillon was influenced by his experiences as a banker, and especially by the speculative bubble of John Law's Mississippi Company. He was also heavily influenced by prior economists, especially William Petty.

== Impact ==
This work is considered the first complete treatise on economics, with numerous contributions to the science. These contributions include: his cause and effect methodology, monetary theories, his conception of the entrepreneur as a risk-bearer, and the development of spatial economics. Cantillon's work had significant influence on the early development of political economy, including the works of Adam Smith, Anne Turgot, Jean-Baptiste Say, Frédéric Bastiat and François Quesnay.
