= Janine Boissard =

French writer (1932–2026)

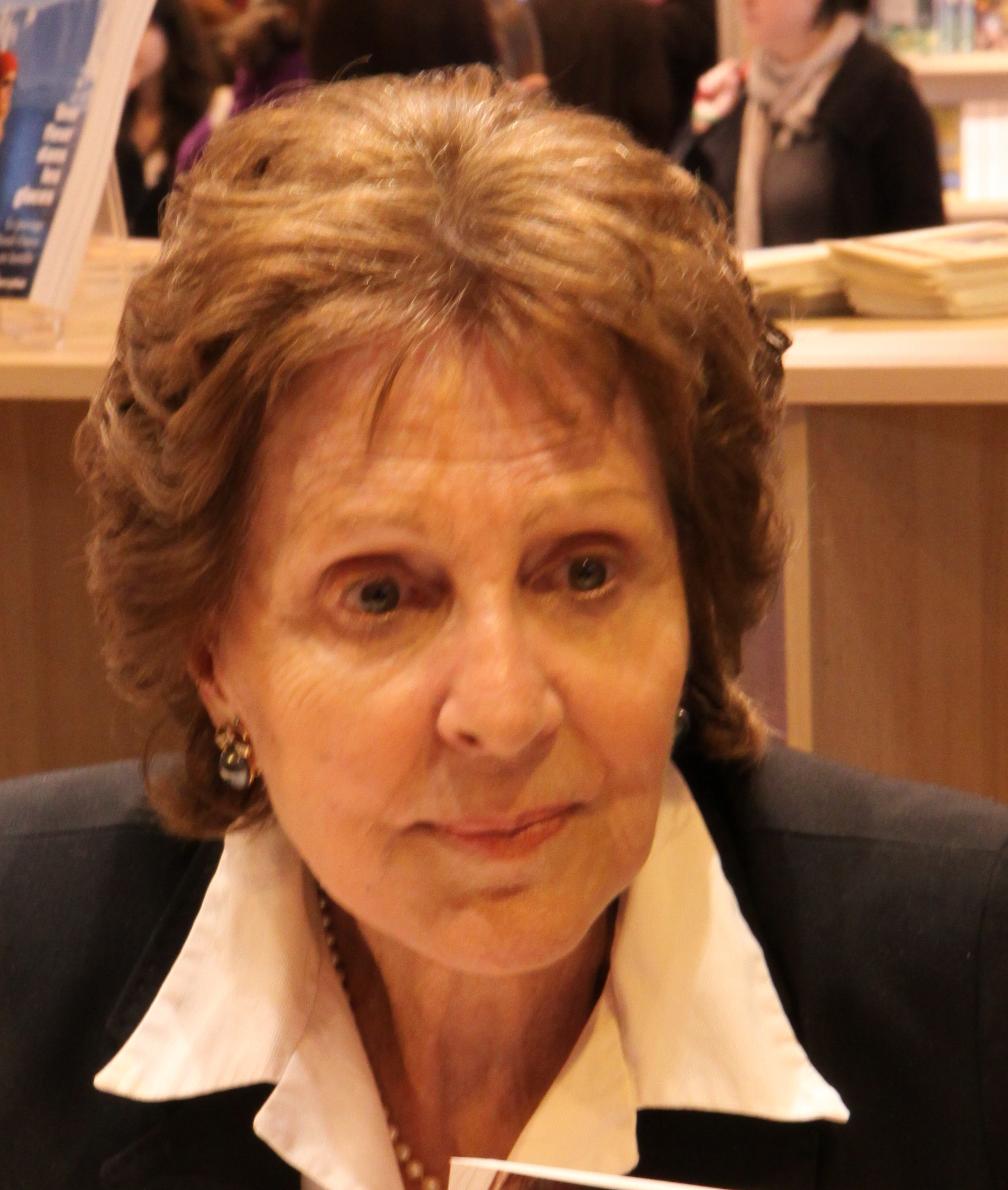
Janine Boissard

Janine Boissard (18 December 1932 – 26 September 2026) was a French writer, best known for her book series L’Esprit de famille (1979–1984), which was adapted into an eponymous French film in 1979 and an eponymous television series in 1982. Born in Paris in 1932, she died in September 2026, at the age of 93.
