= Walter Stewart (MP) =

The Honourable Walter Stewart (died c. 1657) was a Scottish courtier, physician, and politician who sat in the House of Commons from 1624 to 1625. He was the father of Frances Stewart, Duchess of Richmond, otherwise known as "La Belle Stuart".

== Life ==
He was the third son of Walter Stewart, 1st Lord Blantyre.

Stewart was admitted to Gray's Inn on 9 March 1620 when he was a Gentleman of the Privy Chamber to James I. In 1624, he was elected Member of Parliament for Monmouth Boroughs but was unseated on petition on 28 March 1624 on the objection that he was a "Scotchman" and not naturalised. However he was re-elected MP for Monmouth in 1625 without further question.

Stewart is also said to have been a qualified doctor. He left England in 1649 for France, where he was court physician to Queen Henrietta Maria. He died in or by 1657.

== Family ==
Stewart married a dresser to Queen Henrietta Maria, Sophia Carew, daughter of Sir George Carew and Thomazine Godolphin. Sophia Carew had been a maid of honour at court and performed in the masque The Shepherd's Paradise. She was the widow of Richard Neville.

Their children included Frances Stewart, Duchess of Richmond and Sophia Bulkeley.

Parliament of England
Preceded by Thomas Ravenscroft	Member of Parliament for Monmouth Boroughs; 1624–1625	Succeeded by William Fortune
