= Jean Boisard =

Jean Boisard (also Boizard) was a learned Frenchman, who died around 1725. His birth date is not known. He is considered to be one of founders, in the 17th century, of numismatics, the science or specialized knowledge and collection of medals and coins. He was Counsellor at the French royal “Cour des Monnaies”. In 1692, he published a short treatise on coins, entitled “Traité des Monnaies, de leurs circonstances et dépendances”. In his book (which was reprinted several times during the first quarter of the 18th century), very precise and accurate details were given on alloy and on manufacturing secrets. As a result, the government forbade its circulation, being afraid that it could be used as a guidebook for counterfeiters. There are still some rare copies available, which are consulted by contemporary specialists of numismatics.

== Works ==
- Traité des monoyes, de leurs circonstances et dépendances, 503 pp. Paris: Veuve de J. B. Coignard & J. B. Coignard, 1692, and later editions in 1711, 1714 and 1723.

== Sources ==
- Chaudon, Louis Mayeul: Nouveau Dictionnaire Historique-Portatif. Ouvrage dans lequel on expose sans flatterie et sans amertume, ce que les écrivains les plus impartiaux ont pensé sur le Génie, le Caractère et les Mœurs des Hommes célèbres dans tous les Genres. Amsterdam, 1770, Vol. I
- Hoefer, Ferdinand : Nouvelle biographie générale, depuis les temps les plus reculés, jusqu’à nos jours. Paris (Didot) 1862, Vol. VI.
- Nouveau dictionnaire historique, ou histoire abrégée de tous les hommes qui se sont fait un nom par des talens, des vertus, des forfaits, des erreurs, etc. depuis le commencement du monde jusqu’à nos jours. Lyon, 7ème édition, 1789, Vol. II
- La Grande Encyclopédie, inventaire raisonné des Sciences, des Lettres et des Arts. Paris, 1902, Vol. VII
- Encyclopédie universelle du XXe siècle, Lettres, Sciences, Arts. Paris, 1908, Tome II
