= Lord Blantyre =

Title for the Peerage of Scotland

- Blazon: Arms: Or, a fess chequy azure and argent, surmounted of a bend engrailed and in chief a rose gules; Crest: A dove holding an olive leaf in its beak proper
- Creation date: 1606
- Created by: James VI
- Peerage: Peerage of Scotland
- First holder: Walter Stewart, 1st Lord Blantyre
- Last holder: Charles Stuart, 12th Lord Blantyre
- Extinction date: 1900
- Former seats: Erskine House; Lennoxlove House
- Motto: Sola Juvat Virtus (Virtue alone delights)

Lord Blantyre was a title in the Peerage of Scotland. The Scottish feudal barony of Blantyre was first documented in the 13th century. In 1606, it was elevated into the Peerage of Scotland for the politician Walter Stewart, who was thus made a Lord of Parliament. The lordship was named for Blantyre Priory in Lanarkshire, where Walter Stewart had been commendator. The main residences associated with the Lords Blantyre were Erskine House (Renfrewshire) and Lennoxlove House (East Lothian).

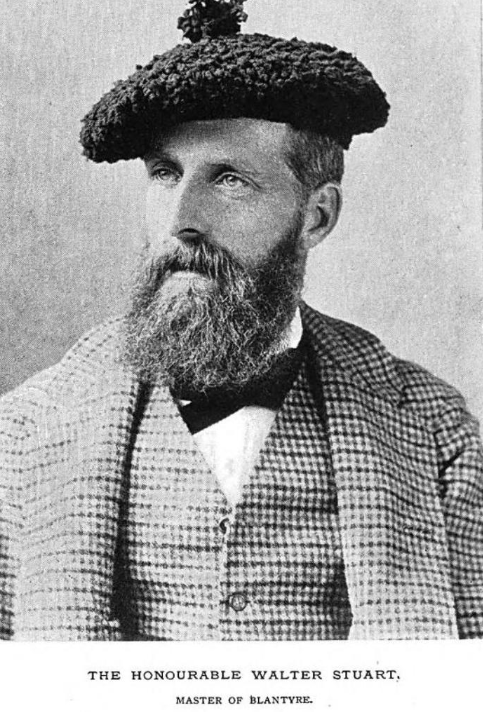

== Lords Blantyre (1606) ==
- Walter Stewart, 1st Lord Blantyre (died 8 March 1617), Scottish politician and courtier
- William Stewart, 2nd Lord Blantyre (died 29 November 1638)
- Walter Stewart, 3rd Lord Blantyre (died October 1641)
- Alexander Stewart, 4th Lord Blantyre (died c. 1670)
- Alexander Stuart, 5th Lord Blantyre (died 20 June 1704), Scottish soldier and politician
- Walter Stuart, 6th Lord Blantyre (1 February 1683 – 23 June 1713)
- Robert Stuart, 7th Lord Blantyre (died 17 November 1743)
- Walter Stuart, 8th Lord Blantyre (died 21 May 1751)
- William Stuart, 9th Lord Blantyre (died 16 January 1776), grandfather of Sir James Brooke, Rajah of Sarawak
- Alexander Stuart, 10th Lord Blantyre (died 5 November 1783)
- Robert Walter Stuart, 11th Lord Blantyre (10 June 1777 – 22 September 1830)
- Charles Stuart, 12th Lord Blantyre (21 December 1818 – 15 December 1900)
  - Walter Stuart, Master of Blantyre (17 July 1851 – 15 March 1895)

== References and further reading ==
- J. Debrett. (1820). Peerage of England, Scotland and Ireland (13th edn.). p. 861.
- Hesilrige, Arthur G. M. (1921). Debrett's Peerage and Titles of courtesy. London: London: Dean & son, limited. p. 121.
