= Walter Stewart, 1st Lord Blantyre =

Scottish courtier and politician

Arms of Stewart of Blantyre

Walter Stewart, 1st Lord Blantyre (1555–1617) was a Scottish courtier and politician. He was Keeper of the Privy Seal of Scotland from 1582 to 1596 and Treasurer of Scotland from 1596 to 1599.

== Early life ==
He was born c. 1555, the son of Sir John Stewart of Minto and Margaret Stewart, sister of James Stewart of Cardonald. His family descended from the Stewarts of Minto, a senior branch of the Clan Stewart headed by the Earl of Galloway. Walter Stewart was educated with King James VI under George Buchanan at Stirling Castle. He seems to have been a good rider, and excelled at mathematics, but did not share the king's wider intellectual interests.

In May 1580 twenty five gentlemen were appointed as "pensioners to attend the King's Majesty at all times on his riding and passing to the fields". The riding entourage included Stewart with, Captain James Stewart, Captain Crawford, the Master of Cathcart, Roger Aston, John Carmichael, James Anstruther, Patrick Hume of Polwarth, and John Stewart of Baldynneis. Stewart became a gentleman in the king's chamber.

== Career at court ==
Between 1587 and 1593 Walter Stewart held the barony of Glasgow, in place of the young Duke of Lennox, and so he appointed the magistrates and Provost of Glasgow.

Stewart was knight of Cardonald, Prior of Blantyre, Keeper of the Privy Seal of Scotland from 1582 to 1596, an Extraordinary Lord of Session from 1593, an Octavian from 1596, and Treasurer of Scotland from 1596 to 1599.

James VI sent John Carmichael and Blantyre to arrest Elizabeth's Irish rebel Brian O'Rourke and take him to England on 3 April 1591. This caused a riot in Glasgow, because the arrest was thought likely to damage the Irish trade, and Blantyre and Carmichael were cursed as "Queen Elizabeth's knights" and the king for taking "English angels", the annuity or subsidy received from Queen Elizabeth. Carmichael and Blantyre hoped Elizabeth might spare O'Rourke so the inhabitants of Glasgow would be reconciled to them, but he was executed.

In July 1593 he was appointed to a council to manage the estates and finances of Anne of Denmark. In December, he was appointed to a committee to audit the account of money spent by the Chancellor, John Maitland of Thirlestane, on the royal voyages. The funds in question came from the English subsidy and the dowry of Anne of Denmark. Stewart wrote letters jointly with Alexander Hay asking lairds to send for provisions for Henry's baptism in August 1594.

After the Kinmont Willie affair, on 8 July 1596 Blantyre wrote to David Foulis, the Scottish ambassador in London, that he should return if Elizabeth's attitude did not improve. He also discussed the case of a counterfeit coiner.

Blantyre was responsible for the prisoner, a son of Sorley Boy MacDonnell, and his wife and servants from August 1596. They were moved from Dumbarton Castle to a house in Dumbarton town, then to Blantyre's own Cardonald Castle, and then lodged in Glasgow.

Blantyre fell off his horse and broke his leg in Edinburgh in February 1597, and while he recovered Lord Ochiltree was treasurer. Roger Aston wrote in April 1597 that his health was weakening and it was feared that he was bewitched. In 1599 he was imprisoned and compelled to resign by James VI, influenced by a group of courtiers in king's bedchamber.

In July 1602 Blantyre joined a committee of "4 Stewarts" to arbitrate between the Marquess of Huntly and the Earl of Moray. The other Stewarts were Lord Ochiltree, Alexander Stewart of Garlies, and the Tutor of Rosyth.

He was a commissioner for union with England in 1604. He was created Lord Blantyre, in the Peerage of Scotland in 1606.

== Family ==
Walter Stewart married Nicola Somerville, daughter of Sir James Somerville of Cambusnethan and Katherine Murray, in December 1582. Their children included;

- Sir James Stewart, Master of Blantyre (died 1609), married Dorothy Hastings, but was killed on 8 November 1609 at Islington, in a duel with Sir George Wharton, who also died.
- William Stewart, 2nd Lord Blantyre (died 1638)
- Hon. Walter Stewart (died c. 1657), married (father of Frances Stewart, Duchess of Richmond and Lennox)
- Anne Stewart, who had a daughter Margaret Hamilton with James Hamilton, 2nd Marquess of Hamilton.

He was half-brother to Matthew Stewart of Minto, four times Lord Provost of Glasgow.

Political offices
Preceded by John Maitland	Keeper of the Privy Seal of Scotland; 1583–1595	Succeeded by Sir Richard Cockburn
Preceded by Sir Thomas Lyon	Treasurer of Scotland; 1596–1599	Succeeded by Alexander Elphinstone
Peerage of Scotland
New title	Lord Blantyre; 1606–1617	Succeeded by William Stewart
