= Frances Stewart, Duchess of Richmond =

Prominent member of the Restoration court

Her Grace The Duchess of Richmond and Lennox
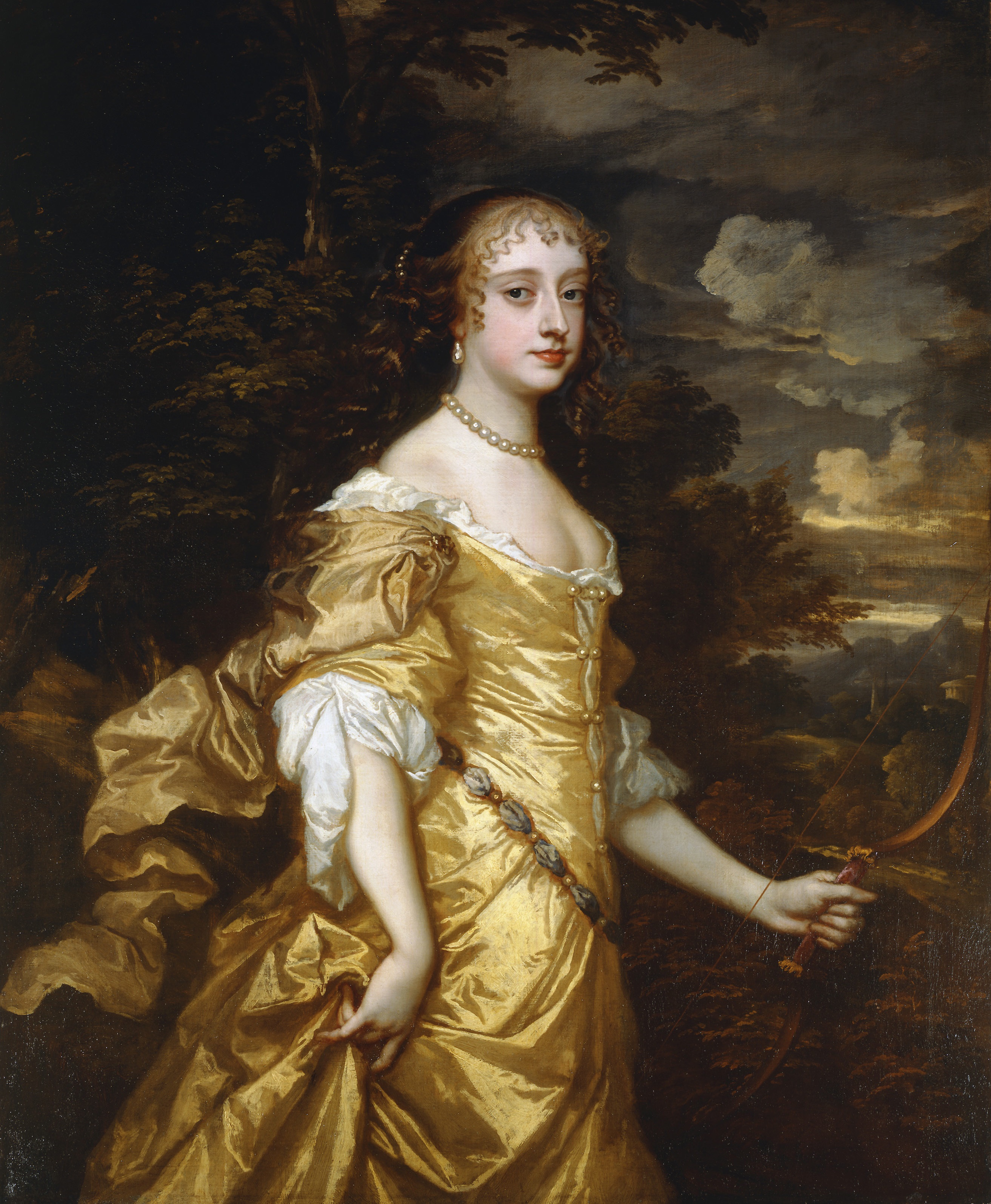
- Frances Teresa Stuart by Sir Peter Lely, c. 1662–65.
- Born: Frances Teresa Stewart; 8 July 1647; Paris, France
- Died: 15 October 1702 (aged 55); England
- Other name: La Belle Stuart
- Occupations: Lady-in-waiting, courtier
- Known for: One of the Windsor Beauties; Refused to be a mistress of Charles II of England
- Spouse: Charles Stewart, 3rd Duke of Richmond (m. 1667; died 1672)
- Parent(s): Walter Stewart; Sophia Carew
- Relatives: Sophia Bulkeley (sister)

Frances Teresa Stewart, Duchess of Richmond and Lennox (8 July 1647 – 15 October 1702) was a prominent member of the Court of the Restoration and famous for refusing to become a mistress of Charles II of England. For her great beauty she was known as La Belle Stuart and served as the model for an idealised, female Britannia. She is one of the Windsor Beauties painted by Sir Peter Lely.

== Biography ==
Frances was the daughter of Walter Stewart, a physician in Queen Henrietta Maria's court, and a distant relative of the royal family as the son of Lord Blantyre, and his wife, Sophia (née Carew). She was born on 8 July 1647 in exile in Paris, but was sent to England in 1663 after the restoration by Charles I's widow, Henrietta Maria, as maid of honour (a court appointment) and subsequently as lady-in-waiting to Charles II's new bride, Catherine of Braganza. The great diarist Samuel Pepys recorded that she was the greatest beauty he ever saw. She had numerous suitors, including the Duke of Buckingham and Francis Digby, son of the Earl of Bristol, whose unrequited love for her was celebrated by Dryden. Her beauty appeared to her contemporaries to be equaled only by her childish silliness; but her letters to her husband, preserved in the British Museum, are not devoid of good sense and feeling.

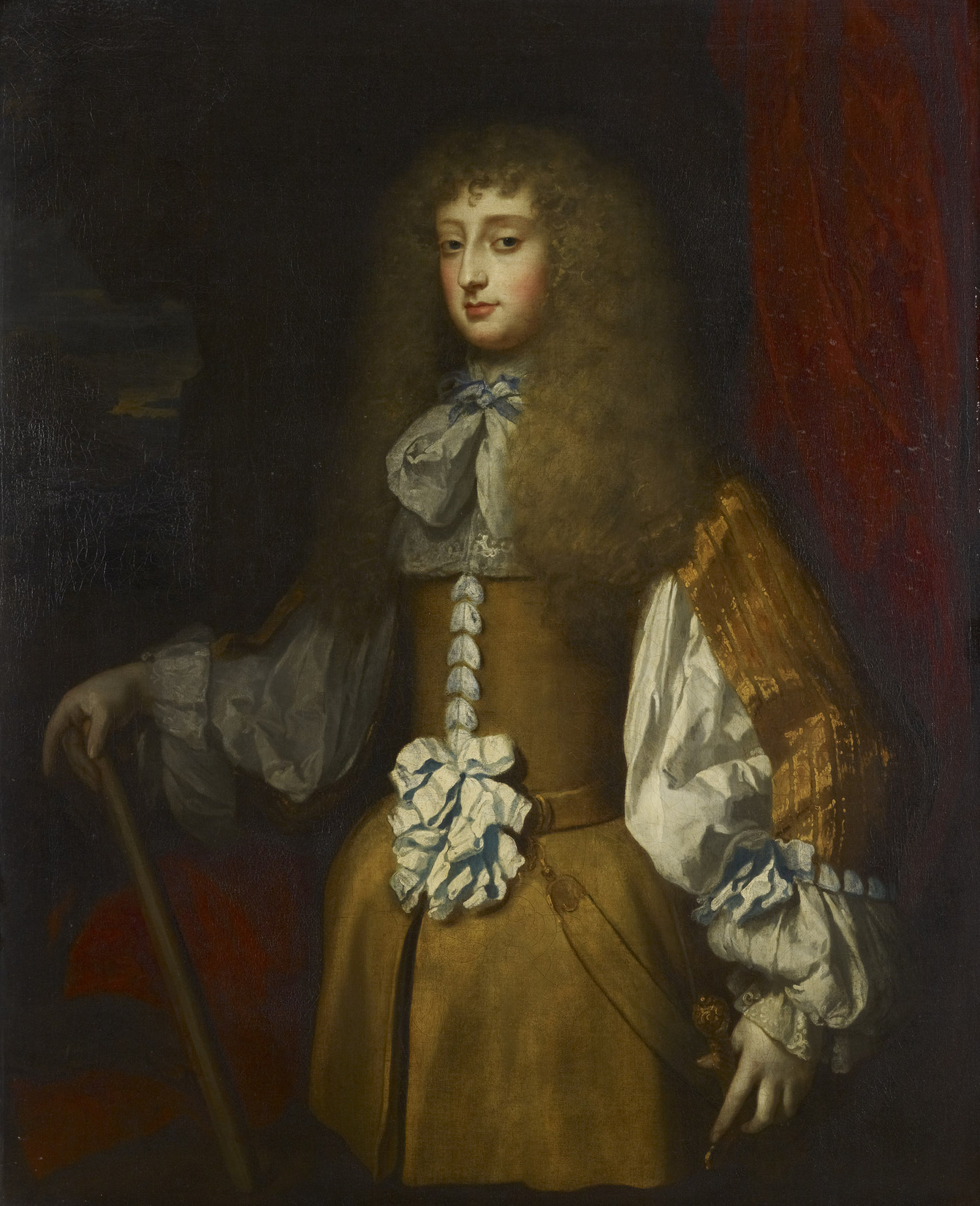
Frances Stewart wearing a buff coat by Jacob Huysmans

The Count de Gramont said of her that "it would be difficult to imagine less brain combined with more beauty."

While a member of the royal court, she caught the eye of Charles II, who fell in love with her. The king's infatuation was so great that when the queen's life was despaired of in 1663, it was reported that he intended to marry Stewart, and four years later he was considering the possibility of obtaining a divorce to enable him to make her his wife because she had refused to become his mistress.

Eventually, in March 1667, she married (as his third wife) Charles Stewart, 3rd Duke of Richmond, 6th Duke of Lennox (1639–1672), a fourth cousin of King Charles II, but produced no issue. It is possible she had to elope, after being discovered with him by Lady Castlemaine, a rival for the king's affections.

The now Duchess of Richmond, however, soon returned to court, where she remained for many years; and although she was disfigured by smallpox in 1669, she retained her hold on the king's affections. It is certain, at least, that Charles went on to post the Duke to Scotland and then to Denmark as ambassador, where he died in 1672. It is however speculated that the duchess and the King may have had an affair. Samuel Pepys recorded in May 1668:

(..)he is mighty hot upon the Duchess of Richmond; insomuch that, upon Sunday was seen, at night, after he had ordered his Guards and coach to be ready to carry him to the Park, he did, on a sudden, take a pair of oars or sculler, and all alone, or but one with him, go to Somersett House, and there, the garden-door not being open, himself clamber over the walls to make a visit to her, which is a horrid shame.

In an episode of the Dutch television series "Verborgen Verleden", it was suggested that she and Charles had an illegitimate daughter named Rebecca, who was kept hidden to preserve Frances' reputation

The duchess was present in 1688 at the birth of James Francis Edward Stuart ("The Old Pretender"), son of James II, and was one of those who signed the certificate before the council. She attended the coronation of Queen Anne in April 1702, before dying in October aged 55. She is buried in the Chantry Chapel of Abbot Islip within Westminster Abbey, alongside the Stuart monarchs. Much of her estate was left in trust to purchase a Scottish property that came to her relative Alexander Stuart, 5th Lord Blantyre; it was renamed from Lethington to Lennoxlove after her.

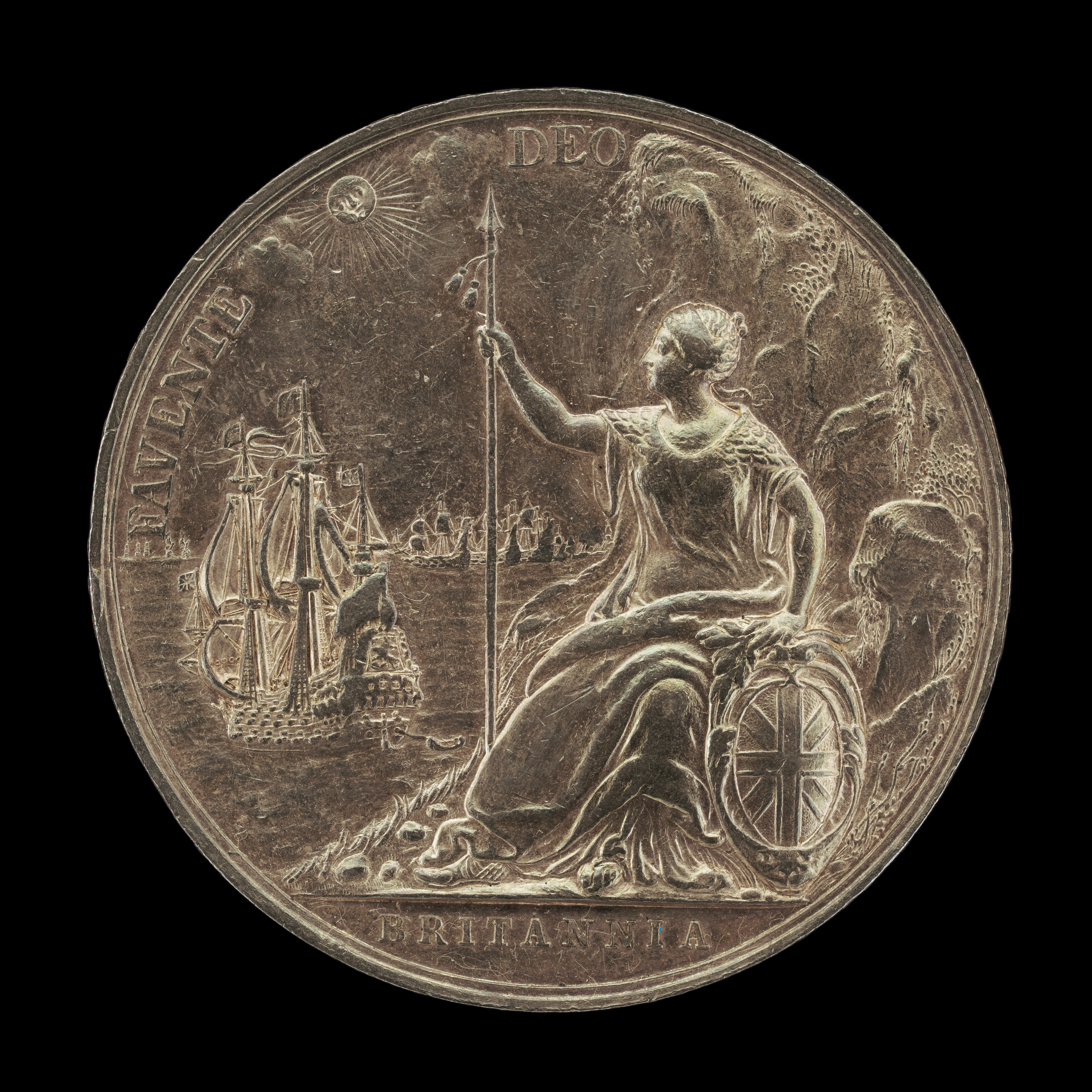
Reverse of a medal commissioned by Charles II from John Roettiers commemorating the 1667 end of the Second Anglo-Dutch War with the Peace of Breda, showing Britannia bareheaded with spear and Union Flag shield, marked: favente Deo ("with God favouring")

== Britannia ==
Following the Second Anglo-Dutch War, Charles had a commemorative medal cast celebrating the 1667 Peace of Breda. According to Samuel Pepys, it was her face that was used by the artist John Roettiers as a model for Britannia, and Roettiers adapted the image for reproduction on the reverse of the copper coins issued from 1672. This was the first time the national personification had appeared on coinage since Roman times and began an ongoing tradition of Britannia depicted on the coins of the pound sterling.

== In fiction ==
- Forever Amber Kathleen Winsor (1944)
- A Health Unto His Majesty (1956) Jean Plaidy
- The Lady on the Coin, by Margaret Campbell Barnes & Hebe Elsna, pub. 1963.
- The Sceptre and the Rose Doris Leslie (1967)
- The Painted Lady Maeve Haran (2011)
- Girl on the Golden Coin Marci Jefferson (2014)
- Dark Stars C.S. Quinn (2016)
- The Great Fire (miniseries) played by Antonia Clarke
