= Sir Richard Williams-Bulkeley, 10th Baronet =

Welsh Liberal politician (1801–1875)

Sir Richard Williams-Bulkeley Bt
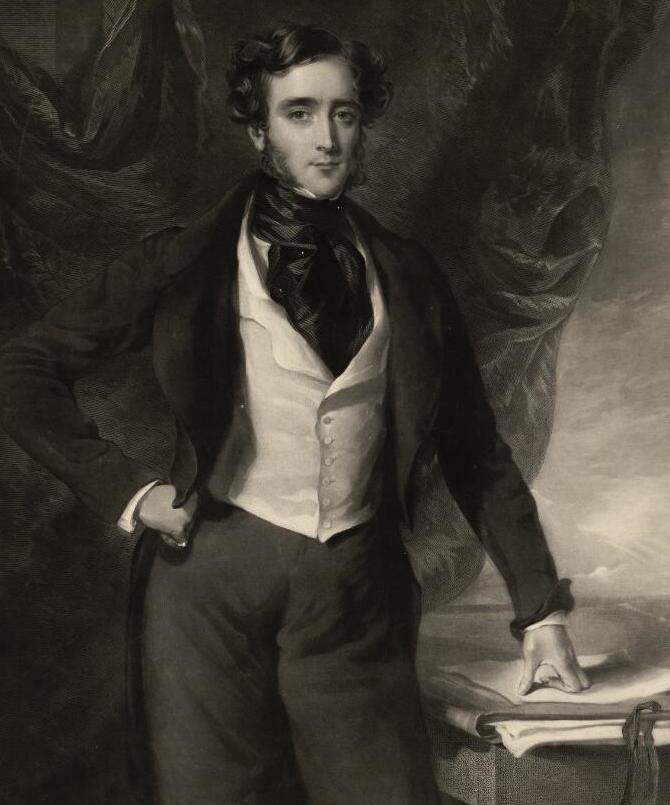
- Sir Richard Williams Bulkeley by Samuel William Reynolds, 1841

Member of Parliament for Anglesey
- In office 1847–1859
- Preceded by: Hon. William Stanley
- Succeeded by: Richard Davies
- In office 1832–1837
- Preceded by: The Earl of Uxbridge
- Succeeded by: Hon. William Stanley

Member of Parliament for Flint Boroughs
- In office 1841–1847
- Preceded by: Charles Dundas
- Succeeded by: Sir John Hanmer, Bt

Member of Parliament for Beaumaris
- In office 1831–1835
- Preceded by: Sir Robert Williams, Bt
- Succeeded by: Frederick Paget

Personal details
- Born: Richard Bulkeley Williams; 23 September 1801
- Died: 28 August 1875 (aged 73)
- Party: Whig; Liberal
- Spouses: Charlotte Mary Hughes (m. 1828; died 1829) Maria Frances Massey-Standley (m. 1830; died 1875)
- Parent(s): Sir Robert Williams, 9th Baronet; Anne Lewis
- Education: Westminster School
- Alma mater: Christ Church, Oxford

Sir Richard Bulkeley Williams-Bulkeley, 10th Baronet (23 September 1801 – 28 August 1875) was an English Whig and Liberal Party politician who sat in the House of Commons variously between 1831 and 1868.

== Early life ==
Richard Bulkeley Williams was born on 23 September 1801 as the eldest son of Sir Robert Williams, 9th Baronet and his wife Anne Lewis, a daughter of the Rev. Edward Hughes of Kinmel Park, Denb.

He was educated at the Westminster School from 1815 to 1819 before matriculating at Christ Church, Oxford in 1820. On 3 June 1822, he succeeded to the estates of uncle, Thomas James Bulkeley, 7th Viscount Bulkeley and 1st Baron Bulkeley. In 1827 he assumed by Royal licence the additional surname of Bulkeley on succeeding to the estates of his uncle. He owned the Caerau mansion at Cylch-y-Garn. He succeeded his father as 10th Baronet on 1 December 1830.

== Career ==
At the 1831 general election Williams-Bulkeley was elected Member of Parliament (MP) for Beaumaris. In the reformed parliament he was elected at the 1832 general election as MP for Anglesey, and held the seat until 1837. He was elected as MP for Flint Boroughs in 1841 and held the seat until 1847. He then stood again and was elected at Anglesey and held the seat until 1868.

He served as Lord Lieutenant of Caernarvonshire from 7 March 1851 to 14 September 1866.

== Personal life ==
On 27 May 1828, he married his cousin, Charlotte Mary Hughes, daughter of William Lewis Hughes. She died on 11 May 1829. On 30 August 1830, Williams-Bulkeley married Maria Frances Massey-Stanley (c. 1810–1889), a daughter of Sir Thomas Stanley-Massey-Stanley, 9th Baronet. Together, they were the parents of:

- Sir Richard Mostyn Lewis Williams-Bulkeley, 11th Baronet (1833–1884), who married Mary Emily Baring, a daughter of Maj. Henry Bingham Baring and Lady Augusta Brudenell (a daughter of Robert Brudenell, 6th Earl of Cardigan). They divorced in 1864 and, in 1866, he married Margaret Elizabeth Peers Williams, a daughter of Lt.-Col. Thomas Peers Williams.

Williams-Bulkeley died at the age of 73 on 28 August 1875. He was succeeded in the baronetcy by his son Richard.

Parliament of the United Kingdom
Preceded by Sir Robert Williams, Bt	Member of Parliament for Beaumaris; 1831–1832	Succeeded by Frederick Paget
Preceded by The Earl of Uxbridge	Member of Parliament for Anglesey; 1832–1837	Succeeded by Hon. William Stanley
Preceded by Charles Dundas	Member of Parliament for Flint Boroughs; 1841–1847	Succeeded by Sir John Hanmer, Bt
Preceded by Hon. William Stanley	Member of Parliament for Anglesey; 1847–1868	Succeeded by Richard Davies
Baronetage of England
Preceded by Robert Williams	Baronet (of Penrhyn); 1830–1875	Succeeded by Richard Williams-Bulkeley
