= Royal Anglesey Militia =

Auxiliary unit of the British Army

Anglesey Militia Royal Anglesey Fusiliers Royal Anglesey Light Infantry Royal Anglesey Royal Engineers
- Active: 1558–1 April 1953
- Country: England (1661–1707); Kingdom of Great Britain (1707–1800); United Kingdom (1801–1953)
- Branch: Militia/Special Reserve
- Role: Infantry; Field engineers
- Size: 1 Battalion
- Garrison/HQ: Beaumaris
- Engagements: Second English Civil War; Second Boer War; World War I; Second Battle of Ypres; Gallipoli campaign; Battle of the Somme; Senussi campaign; Sinai and Palestine campaign; Battle of Cambrai; German spring offensive; Hundred Days Offensive

The Royal Anglesey Militia, later the Royal Anglesey Royal Engineers (RARE) was an auxiliary (Note: It is incorrect to describe the British Militia as 'irregular': throughout their history they were equipped and trained exactly like the line regiments of the regular army, and once embodied in time of war they were fulltime professional soldiers for the duration of their enlistment.) regiment organised in the Welsh island county of Anglesey (Note: At different periods the island and unit title were often spelled 'Anglesea'.) during the 18th Century from earlier precursor units. Primarily intended for home defence, it served in Britain and Ireland through all Britain's major wars. In 1877 it became a unit of the Royal Engineers (REs) and in this role detachments saw active service during the Second Boer War. It served as a Special Reserve unit in World War I, supplying several siege, railway and field engineer companies to the fighting fronts as well as training men for the REs. After 1921 the militia had only a shadowy existence until its final abolition in 1953.

== Anglesey Trained Bands ==
The universal obligation to military service in the Shire levy was long established in England and was extended to Wales as counties were established there. King Henry VIII called a 'Great Muster' in 1539, which showed 1228 men available for service in the County of Anglesey, of whom 620 were armoured foot soldiers, while 114 had 'coats of fence' and the remainder were unarmoured.

The legal basis of the militia was updated by two Acts of 1557 covering musters and the maintenance of horses and armour. The county militia was now under the Lord Lieutenant, assisted by the Deputy Lieutenants and Justices of the Peace. The entry into force of these Acts in 1558 is seen as the starting date for the organised Militia of England and Wales. Although the militia obligation was universal, it was clearly impractical to train and equip every able-bodied man, so after 1572 the practice was to select a proportion of men for the Trained Bands (TBs), who were mustered for regular training. During the Armada crisis of 1588, Anglesey had 1108 able-bodied footmen and 17 light horse available.

In the 16th Century little distinction was made between the militia and the troops levied by the counties for overseas expeditions. However, the counties usually conscripted the unemployed and criminals rather than send the Trained Bandsmen. Between 1585 and 1602 Anglesey supplied 251 men for service in Ireland. The men were given three days' 'conduct money' to get to Chester, the main port of embarkation for Ireland. The Anglesey levies of 1601 were particularly well clothed, arousing envy from the men of other counties. Conduct money was recovered from the government, but replacing the weapons issued to the levies from the militia armouries was a heavy cost on the counties.

With the passing of the threat of invasion, the trained bands declined in the early 17th Century. Later, King Charles I attempted to reform them into a national force or 'Perfect Militia' answering to the king rather than local control. In 1637 the Anglesey Trained Bands consisted of 400 men, of whom 259 carried muskets and 141 were pikemen; there was also a Troop of 25 horse. Anglesey was ordered to send a TB contingent to join those of the northern counties of England for the Second Bishops' War of 1640. However, substitution was rife and many of those sent on this unpopular service would have been untrained replacements.

=== Civil Wars ===
Control of the militia was one of the areas of dispute between Charles I and Parliament that led to the English Civil War. When open war broke out between the King and Parliament, neither side made much use of the trained bands beyond securing the county armouries for their own full-time troops. Most of Wales was under Royalist control for much of the war, and was a recruiting ground for the King's armies. The Anglesey TBs probably garrisoned Beaumaris Castle under Thomas Bulkeley, 1st Viscount Bulkeley, but although there were fears of a seaborne attack by Parliamentary forces they saw no action. Bulkeley was ousted as governor by David Lloyd in October 1645. When the castle was summoned by Parliamentarian Major-General Thomas Mytton in 1646, Bulkeley's nephew Colonel Richard Bulkeley with his regiment of horse briefly seized the castle from Lloyd, but surrender terms were quickly agreed on 14 June and the whole island was handed over with little bloodshed. A small Parliamentarian force garrisoned Beaumaris thereafter.

In the Second English Civil War Sir John Owen raised North Wales for the king, and the Beaumaris garrison under Captain Thomas Symkis, together with the Anglesey TBs from the north of the island under Colonel John Robinson, declared for the Royalists. When Owen's small force of local levies ambushed Mytton at a skirmish at Glynllifon Park in Caernarfonshire, it probably included Anglesey TB men, because the Bulkeleys and Robinson were present. However, the Parliamentarians regrouped and Owen retreated towards Anglesey, being captured at the Battle of Y Dalar Hir on the foreshore on 5 June. On 1 October nine boatloads of Parliamentary troops crossed the Menai Strait to establish a bridgehead, and the Anglesey TBs failed to engage them. Marching on Beaumaris the Parliamentary force defeated the Royalists, including Bulkeley's TB, at Red Hill. On hearing the news Robinson's Northern TB appears to have dissolved. On 2 October Mytton threatened to hang the prisoners if Beaumaris did not surrender. It did so, and Bulkeley and Robinson fled overseas.

== Restoration Militia ==
After the Restoration of the Monarchy, the Militia was re-established by the Militia Act of 1661 under the control of the king's lords lieutenant, the men to be selected by ballot. This was popularly seen as the 'Constitutional Force' to counterbalance a 'Standing Army' tainted by association with the New Model Army that had supported Cromwell's military dictatorship.

The militia forces in the Welsh counties were small, and were grouped together under the command of the Lord President of the Council of Wales. As Lord President, the Duke of Beaufort carried out a tour of inspection of the Welsh militia in 1684, when the Anglesey Militia consisted of a troop of horse commanded by Captain Bulkeley and four companies of foot. In 1697 they consisted of 26 horse and 250 foot commanded by Colonel Arthur Owen.

Generally the militia declined during the long peace after the Treaty of Utrecht in 1713. Jacobites were numerous amongst the Welsh Militia, but they did not show their hands during the Risings of 1715 and 1745, and bloodshed was avoided in Wales.

== 1757 reforms ==
Under threat of French invasion during the Seven Years' War a series of Militia Acts from 1757 re-established county militia regiments, the men being conscripted by means of parish ballots (paid substitutes were permitted) to serve for three years. There was a property qualification for officers, who were commissioned by the lord lieutenant. An adjutant and drill sergeants were to be provided to each regiment from the Regular Army, and arms and accoutrements would be supplied when the county had secured 60 per cent of its quota of recruits.

Anglesey's quota was a company of just 80 men, but Maj-Gen the Earl of Cholmondeley, who was Lord Lieutenant of Anglesey and several other counties, found that he was unable to raise militia in any of his Welsh counties other than Flintshire. The problem was less with the other ranks raised by ballot than the shortage of men qualified to be officers, even after the property requirements were lowered for Welsh counties. Cholmondeley was replaced as lord lieutenant by the 1st Earl of Powis in 1761 and the Anglesey Militia was finally raised on 19 November 1762.

However, by now the war was drawing to a close. The arms having been issued on 19 November 1762, the men underwent a short training period and were then dismissed to their homes without being embodied for permanent service. Thereafter the unit would have been assembled for its annual peacetime training, and its numbers kept up by periodic enforcement of the ballot.

=== American War of Independence ===
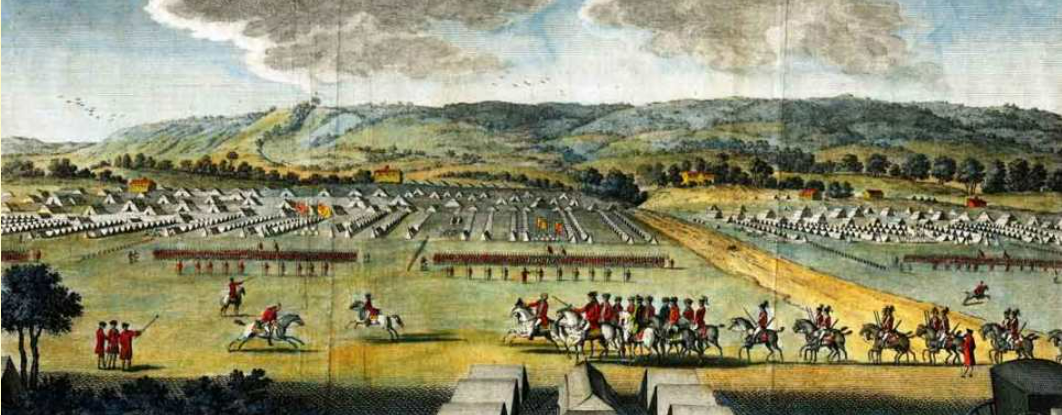
Coxheath Camp in 1778.

During the American War of Independence Britain was threatened with invasion by the Americans' allies, France and Spain. The militia were called out early in 1778, and the Anglesey unit was ordered to be embodied for the first time on 31 March. This took place at Llannerch-y-medd on 7 April. The company was inspected and issued with ammunition on 25 April, then left for garrison duty at Caernarfon.

The Anglesey company remained at Caernarfon until the spring of 1779, when it was marched to Kent to join Coxheath Camp near Maidstone. This was the army's largest training camp, where the militia were exercised as part of a division alongside regular troops while providing a reserve in case of French invasion of South East England. The understrength militia units from small counties (Anglesey, Carnarvon and Rutland) were attached to guard the artillery park of the division. After returning to Anglesey for the winter, the unit went back to Kent in 1780 to join the anti-invasion forces. It was at Coxheath Camp again in the summer of 1781. Desertion was a problem among militiamen, but the officers were not necessarily better behaved: in November 1779 Lieutenant Baillie of the Anglesey Militia was given leave, and simply disappeared.

In 1778 Parliament had sanctioned the augmentation of the balloted militia by voluntary enlistment, limited to one company per battalion. William Peacocke persuaded the Lord Lieutenant to allow him to form four such 'volunteer' companies to raise the Anglesey Militia to regimental status, for which Peacocke would be commissioned Lieutenant-Colonel Commandant. Peacocke gained his recruits mainly from Ireland through an unscrupulous agent in Dublin, who enlisted poor quality men, many from Workhouses and prisons, together with a smattering of militia deserters. The officers (contrary to regulations) had no connection with Anglesey, and neither they nor the non-commissioned officers (NCOs) had any experience. While these companies were stationed at Ellesmere, Shropshire, in August 1780 the Irish and Welsh soldiers quarrelled, and the soldiers 'abused and very ill-treated' their officers. The officers appealed to the Worcestershire Militia at Shrewsbury to help suppress the mutinous outbreak. Luckily the men had not yet received their weapons, and an armed sergeant's guard from Shrewsbury was sufficient to arrest the offenders. The regiment was moved to Oswestry, where the men terrified the inhabitants. Meanwhile, the two balloted companies of the Anglesey Militia, which had been serving in Kent under the command of Capt Herbert Jones, were ordered to Oswestry to join the regiment, where they tried to distance themselves from the Irish companies. Finding himself superseded by Peacocke (a frequent complaint concerning the way the volunteer companies were raised), Jones returned to Anglesey to try to put things right. Early in 1781 Peacocke led the regiment from Oswestry on a march to Bristol, but the Irish companies rioted at Kidderminster in March and 20 people were injured. The Welsh companies and Jones appealed to the House of Commons for redress and Peacocke was court-martialled in May 1782. He was found guilty on one charge and sentenced to be cashiered, but immediately pardoned. Meanwhile, the war was coming to an end. In February 1782 the balloted companies returned to Anglesey to be disembodied, while the Irish volunteer companies were moved to Winchester. The reinstated Peacocke was then ordered to march them to Holyhead to be paid off: he would have to bear the cost of the passage back to Dublin out of his own pocket. Herbert Jones remained in command of the disembodied militia until his retirement in 1793.

From 1784 to 1792 the militia were assembled for their 28 days' annual peacetime training, but to save money only two-thirds of the men were actually mustered each year.

=== French Revolutionary and Napoleonic Wars ===
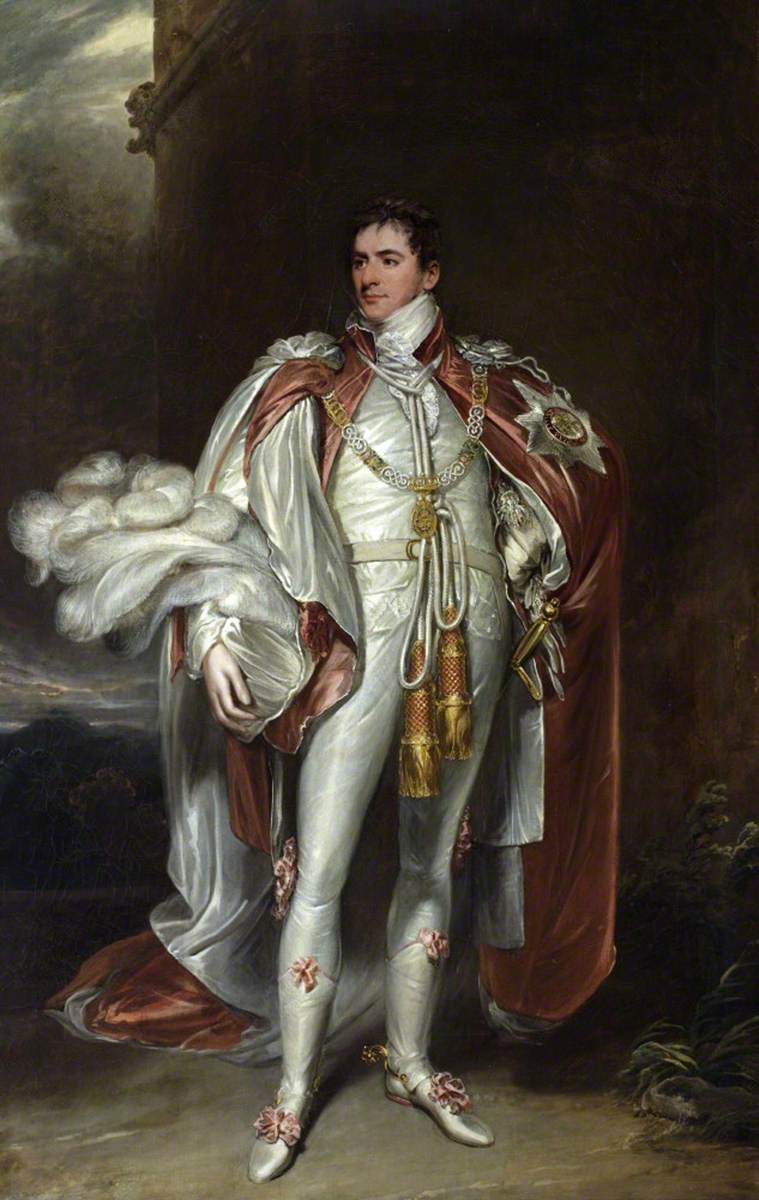
Arthur Paget, colonel of the Anglesey Militia from 1795 to 1798

The international situation deteriorated in 1792 and before the end of the year the government was preparing to call out the militia. The Anglesey unit was officially designated the Royal Anglesey Fusiliers, and it was embodied in 1793 as Revolutionary France declared war against Britain.

The French Revolutionary Wars saw a new phase for the English and Welsh militia: they were embodied for a whole generation, and became regiments of full-time professional soldiers (though restricted to service in the British Isles), which the regular army increasingly saw as a prime source of recruits. They served in coast defences, manned garrisons, guarded prisoners of war, and carried out internal security duties, while their traditional local defence role was taken over by the part-time Volunteers and mounted Yeomanry. Shortly after its embodiment the Royal Anglesey Fusiilers went to Hampshire, where it had detachments at Portsmouth and Forton Barracks, Gosport. Here the duties were mainly dockyard security and escorts for parties of prisoners of war. An Act of 1794 permitted the augmentation of the militia and the Angleseys added an extra company of 82 men.

In a fresh attempt to have as many men as possible under arms for home defence in order to release regulars, in 1796 the Government created the Supplementary Militia, a compulsory levy of men to be trained in their spare time, and to be incorporated in the Regular Militia in emergency. Anglesey's quota was fixed at 320 men in one regiment of 3 companies.

The regiment seems to have been based at Liverpool in 1798, possibly in connection with the Irish Rebellion. But the war with France was coming to an end: the Supplementary Militia were stood down and Anglesey's quota was reduced to 128 men. The Treaty of Amiens was signed in March 1802, and the Royal Anglesey Fusiliers were disembodied.

However, the Peace of Amiens was short-lived and the militia were embodied once more in 1803. The Angleseys under the command of Major William Lewis Hughes were marched towards the south coast of England, which was again threatened with invasion. The Volunteers were also reactivated: the Anglesey Loyal Volunteers raised in 1803 consisted of two battalions under the command of Col Thomas, 7th Viscount Bulkeley.

The Anglesey Militia's right to its 'Royal' prefix was confirmed in 1804. It continued to serve in South East England: in early May 1808 it marched out of winter quarters at Norwich en route for Chatham, Kent. In August that year, while stationed at Margate, the regiment volunteered for active service in the Peninsular War, though the offer was declined by the War Office (WO). However, a number of the men volunteered to transfer to the regular army, leaving the regiment short of its establishment that summer, when it was stationed at Ospringe Barracks, near Faversham, in July and Deal in August. It was given a deadline of October to recruit back to full strength. In 1810 the regiment's title was changed to Royal Anglesey Light Infantry (RALI). Early in 1811 it was stationed at Eastbourne in Sussex, moving out to Langney Point Barracks in June.

During the summer of 1805, when Napoleon was massing his 'Army of England' at Boulogne for a projected invasion, 2 companies (154 effectives) of the regiment under Lt-Col William Lewis Hughes were stationed at Newcastle upon Tyne as part of Maj-Gen Henry George Grey's brigade.

=== Anglesey Local Militia ===
While the Regular Militia were the mainstay of national defence during the Napoleonic Wars, they were supplemented from 1808 by the Local Militia, which were part-time and only to be used within their own districts. These were raised to counter the declining numbers of Volunteers, and if their ranks could not be filled voluntarily the militia ballot was employed.

The Anglesey Local Militia appears to have been formed in January 1809, commanded by Col Viscount Bulkeley, most of the officers and some at least of the men transferring with him from the Loyal Volunteer Infantry. The senior major was Sir Robert Williams, 9th Baronet, who held the same rank in the Loyal Volunteers and was formerly commander of the Loyal Snowdon Rangers, a Caernarfonshire volunteer unit, while the second major was John Bodychan Sparrow, transferred from the Royal Anglesey Fusiliers in which he had been a captain.

=== Ireland ===
In 1811 the RALI volunteered to serve in Ireland, and in the latter part of the year it embarked and was stationed at Omagh. It stayed in Ireland for over 15 months, until June 1813 when it marched from Downpatrick to Dublin and embarked for Liverpool. Later that month the regiment marched to Bristol, but in mid-July was sent to Nottingham, possibly in connection with the Luddite unrest. It stayed there until June 1814 when orders came for the regiment to be stood down. It marched back to Beaumaris and was disembodied in July. Unlike some militia units, the RALI was not embodied during the brief Waterloo campaign the following year.

=== Long peace ===
After Waterloo there was another long peace. Although officers continued to be commissioned into the militia and ballots were still held, the regiments were rarely assembled for training and the permanent staffs of sergeants and drummers (who were occasionally used to maintain public order) were progressively reduced. The ballot was suspended by the Militia Act 1829. In 1845–46 there was an effort to replace elderly members of the permanent staff and to appoint a few younger officers from the county gentry, though they had no duties to perform.

William Lewis Hughes of Lleiniog, later Lord Dinorben, remained in command as Major-Commandant, though he held the personal rank of colonel.

== 1852 Reforms ==
The Militia of the United Kingdom was revived by the Militia Act 1852, enacted during a renewed period of international tension. As before, units were raised and administered on a county basis, and filled by voluntary enlistment (although conscription by means of the Militia Ballot might be used if the counties failed to meet their quotas). Training was for 56 days on enlistment, then for 21–28 days per year, during which the men received full army pay. Under the Act, militia units could be embodied by Royal Proclamation for full-time home defence service in three circumstances:

1. 'Whenever a state of war exists between Her Majesty and any foreign power'.
2. 'In all cases of invasion or upon imminent danger thereof'.
3. 'In all cases of rebellion or insurrection'.

The Anglesey Militia was revived in 1852 as the 'Royal Anglesey Rifle Corps, but the following year reverted to its previous Light Infantry title. Annual training was resumed in 1853. Lord Dinorben died during 1852 and was succeeded as Lt-colonel commandant by Thomas Peers Williams of Craig-y-Don on 10 March 1853

=== Crimean War and after ===
War having broken out with Russia in 1854 and an expeditionary force sent to the Crimea, the militia began to be called out for home defence. The RALI was embodied in 1855, but spent the whole period at Beaumaris, where the men were quartered in inns and lodging houses while they trained. A number of men volunteered for the regulars. The regiment was disembodied on 31 May 1856.

The RALI consisted of only three companies, and on 28 July 1860, in line with its policy of amalgamating the militia regiments from the small Welsh counties, the WO ordered the regiment to merge with the Royal Carnarvon Rifles as the Royal Carnarvon and Anglesey Rifles. The two lieutenant-colonels continued as joint commandants, but unlike some of the other forced mergers, it appears that the Anglesey and Caernarfonshire contingents did actually train together at Caernarfon. In 1861 the combined regiment was re-equipped with the short pattern Enfield rifle in place of the 1853 pattern Enfield. In 1867 the WO rescinded the mergers of the Welsh militia regiments, and on 11 March the RALI regained its independence, including its previous title and uniform.

== Cardwell Reforms ==
Under the 'Localisation of the Forces' scheme introduced by the Cardwell Reforms of 1872, militia regiments were brigaded with their local regular and Volunteer battalions. The Anglesey, Carnarvon, Denbigh, Flint and Merioneth Militia were all assigned to Sub-District No 23 at Wrexham with the 23rd Foot (the Royal Welch Fusiliers). The militia now came under the WO rather than their county lords lieutenant. Around a third of the recruits and many young officers went on to join the regular army.

Following the Cardwell Reforms a mobilisation scheme began to appear in the Army List from December 1875. This assigned places in an order of battle to militia units serving alongside regular units in an 'Active Army' and a 'Garrison Army'. The RALI's assigned war station was with the Garrison Army in the Pembroke defences.

== Royal Anglesey Royal Engineers ==
Artillery Militia units had been created under the 1852 reforms; now the WO decided that it needed similar support for the Royal Engineers (REs), whose role was growing in scale and importance. Two existing militia infantry regiments were chosen for conversion in 1877: the Royal Monmouth and the Royal Anglesey. The latter became the Royal Anglesey Engineers Militia on 1 April 1877, designated the Royal Anglesey Royal Engineers (Militia) (RARE) from 1896. After basic infantry training the annual training of the RE militia emphasised the construction of fortifications, Sapping, mining and bridge-building. Later, railway maintenance was added to the tasks undertaken.

Although the Royal Monmouth (RMRE) already recruited large numbers of miners, quarrymen and artisans, who were prime recruits for the RE, it is not clear why Anglesey was chosen for the second unit. However, its recruiting area was widened to include other quarrying and industrial areas of North Wales: although the first two companies of the RARE continued to be based in Anglesey, the third was organised by 1890 as two Sub-Divisions from Carnarvon and Merioneth, and by the end of the 1890s two further Sub-Divisions had appeared, from Flint and Denbigh, the four together equating to three full companies.

=== Second Boer War ===
After the disasters of Black Week at the start of the Second Boer War in December 1899, most of the regular army was sent out and the auxiliary RE units (Militia and Volunteers) volunteered for service in South Africa. The RARE supplied a Special Service Section of 25 other ranks (ORs) for work on the Lines of Communication. This embarked on 6 March 1900 under the command of Capt J.L. Hampton-Lewis and on arrival was attached to 'A' Pontoon Troop, RE, at Ladysmith. It helped to repair the railway between Ladysmith and Standerton, including clearing the Laing's Nek tunnel. Afterwards it erected pontoon bridges for Lt-Gen French's Column in South-East Transvaal, and later served 'on trek' with columns under Maj-Gen Smith-Dorrien and Col Campbell. The whole of the RARE was embodied for home service on 7 May 1900, carrying out duties for the regulars who were absent in South Africa.

On 6 June 1900 the RARE sent a full company (three officers and 103 ORs) to South Africa under the command of Maj F.H. Rawlins. On arrival, 'A' Company was stationed at Kimberley, Naauwpoort and De Aar. A sergeant and 11 ORs were in the siege of Schweizer-Reneke from 19 August to 25 November 1900 and were commended for their work. The company was later engaged in construction work on the railways and in erecting blockhouses. The Special Service Section returned home in June 1901 and A Company on 16 October 1901 (the day the RARE was disembodied), having lost two sappers died of disease. The participants were awarded the Queen's South Africa Medal with the clasps for 'Cape Colony', 'Transvaal', 'Laings Nek' (Special Service Section only), 'Orange Free State' (A Co only) and '1901' (A Co only).

== Special Reserve ==
After the Boer War the RARE was reorganised in 1902 into one field company, two service companies, and one depot company. Under the Haldane reforms of 1908, the Militia became the Special Reserve (SR), with the primary duty of supplying reservists and training recruits for the regular army in time of war. In addition to the depot, the RARE (SR) was tasked with providing one (later two) siege company and one railway company (both branches that were being run down in the Regular RE). The retention of the Anglesey and Monmouth railway companies in the SR was never actually authorised, but they continued to carry out their annual training at the RE's Longmoor Military Railway.

== World War I ==
On the outbreak of World War I on 4 August 1914 the RARE was embodied at Beaumaris under the command of Col C.G. Matthews Donaldson with the following organisation:

- No 1 Siege Company
- No 2 Siege Company
- No 3 Railway Company
- Depot Company – redesignated Royal Anglesey Reserve Battalion January 1918

Nos 1–3 Companies joined the British Expeditionary Force (BEF) on the Western Front before the end of the year. As the RE rapidly grew to meet its wartime commitments the RARE was expanded from four to 10 companies, of which Nos 4 and 5 also served overseas. The depot was commanded by Col Matthews Donaldson. Company commanders at the Training Battalion, RE, (later 1st Reserve Battalion) preparing new RE officers and men at Chatham were provided by SR officers from the Anglesey and Monmouth RE for most of the war.

=== 1st Siege Company ===
No 1 Siege Co was initially sent to Belfast for duty, but embarked for France with 6 officers and 215 ORs aboard the Blackwell on 3 November 1914. Among the officers who embarked with the company was Captain Lord Norreys, heir of the Earl of Abingdon, who had previously served with the 3rd (Royal Berkshire Militia) Battalion, Royal Berkshire Regiment and in the Boer War with the Imperial Yeomanry before joining the RARE on 29 August 1907. On arrival the company joined 'Army Troops' with the BEF.

At the time of the company's arrival, the Western Front was solidifying into Trench warfare, with the BEF digging in between the Ypres Salient and the La Bassée Canal – exactly the 'siege' conditions for which the RARE had trained. By July 1915 the BEF had begun organising specific 'Army Troops' companies, RE, of which two were assigned to each Corps, intended particularly to work on water supply, road construction and repair, and erecting hutting. The large Anglesey and Monmouth Siege companies each counted as two AT companies.

At the end of September 1915 the company was working on the Riez–Bailleul defence line near La Gorgue, then in October it went to improve the support line and communication trenches near Locon and Givenchy. On 9 October Maj D.O. Springfield of the RARE arrived to take over command of the company, which moved to Vieille-Chapelle and worked for the rest of the year on various tasks such as road repairs, drainage and constructing huts and bath houses for rest camps. In April 1916 the company returned to work on the lines, including building machine gun emplacements (MGEs) and artillery observation posts (OPs). The sector was quiet while the great Somme offensive was fought further south. In the autumn the company resumed work on camps and billets. In December it was building MGEs when Maj R.K. McClymont of the RARE took over command. From February 1917 company was divided up into detachments across XI Corps' rear areas, with HQ at Saint-Saëns. Tasks included forestry work in the Forêt d'Eu and digging wells. In June 1917 The RE issued a new war establishment for the company, allowing it more skilled tradesmen, and next month it established a new HQ and workshops at Buchy. It was specially selected by the chief engineer of Fourth Army to build steel bridges, borrowing a number of tradesmen from the RE base. The Right Half company built the first bridge at Dunkirk, despite the sector being under shellfire. Left Half company built another at Saint-Omer, and then converted an old factory into a laundry for Fourth Army. In November the company erected machinery at a new RE yard at Dunkirk and worked on the water supply at Saint-Omer. December was spent on hutting and defence works.

==== German Spring Offensive ====
On 16 January 1918 the two half companies were taken by road to Ham in the Somme sector under Fifth Army. With the company concentrated for the first time since November 1916, it was reorganised into four 50-strong sections, two working on artillery positions for XVIII Corps, two in rear areas, and the HQ section working on supply dumps. The rear area tasks included building Nissen huts to house the Chinese Labour Corps and a Prisoner-of-war camp, and inspecting and repairing bridges. In February the company took over running XVIII Corps' workshops, and a detachment was attached to 4th Siege Company, RARE, to build a Corduroy road. The German spring offensive opened on 21 March and made rapid progress: at 06.00 1st Siege Company was ordered to man battle stations. It sent sent demolition teams off to destroy key bridges before they could fall into enemy hands, being given responsibility for demolishing those over the Somme at Ham.

No 2 Section had been working for 14th Brigade, Royal Garrison Artillery (RGA); it dug a line of trench at Aubigny and manned it (losing two men wounded) until infantry arrived to take over on 22 March. Next day Company HQ moved to Roye, where it was joined by all its detachments. On 24 March it dug a line of trench in front of Nesle, and then advanced in open order to reinforce the infantry. Major McClymont was evacuated to hospital on 25 March; he was later replaced by Maj D.A. MacDougall. As the 'Great Retreat' continued, the company prepared successive trench lines. On 30 March XVIII Corps HQ was relieved, and the company was sent to Blangy-Tronville to join XIX Corps. On 2 April it began digging rear defences between Blangy and Villers-Bretonneux, coming under III Corps. As the First Battle of Villers-Bretonneux raged, the company was told on 5 April that it was to become part of a fighting group under 172nd Tunnelling Company, RE. However, the German advance was halted in front of Villers-Bretonneux that day, and the fighting group was broken up on 15 April. 1st Siege Company resumed building rear defence lines, but on 17–18 and 24 April was again ordered to man these defences in case of a serious German attack. The attack on 24 April (the Second Battle of Villers-Bretonneux) was decisively broken, but shelling continued and the company suffered a few casualties on 26 April while working on the Bois Switch Line. On 5 May it was ordered to Baizieux where it worked with 180th Tunnelling Company, RE, on constructing deep dugouts and MGEs. On 9 May the billet of a six-man detachment guarding III Corps' RE dump was hit by a shell: four were killed or died of wounds and the other two wounded. From 14 May the company was employed in building a slab road with the assistance of 156th and later 713rd Labour Companies of the Labour Corps; the men were warned to rendezvous at the transport lines in case of a serious enemy attack. By 23 May, when the supply of slabs ran out, the company had laid 2600 yards of this road, and continued until the end of the month erecting brushwood screens for the roadway and improving the cross-country tracks.

==== Hundred Days Offensive ====
The Allies launched their counter-offensive (the Hundred Days Offensive) with the Battle of Amiens on 8 August. The German offensives had run their course by now, and there was a lull in the fighting. 1st Siege Co spent June digging and wiring the Lahoussoye defence line and the Vaden Switch while continuing work on cross-country tracks. For the Vaden Switch line the company was joined by 709th and 713th Labour Companies and C Company of 1st Battalion, 108th US Army Engineers. From 18 July the company was also engaged with other labour companies in building dugouts, OPs and road screens. Work on the Vaden line ended in early August, and parties from the company reconnoitred bridges they might be called on to demolish if the enemy attacked. However, the Allies launched their own offensive (the Hundred Days Offensive) with the Battle of Amiens on 8 August, in which III Corps was heavily engaged, and the company was switched to repairing roads for the advance. On 31 August the company, with HQ at Hardecourt joined a group of engineer and labour units to manage III Corps' water supply, and the road work was transferred to 4th Siege Co, RARE. On 23 September III Corps handed over to II US Corps for the forthcoming attack on the St Quentin Canal. The company continued its water supply work, following the advancing Fourth Army, with company HQ moving up to Landrecies on 8 November. Hostilities ended with when the Armistice with Germany came into force on 11 November 1918.

After the Armistice work continued in the liberated areas of France. On 13 November 1st Siege Co was taken off water supply and sent to work at the RE supply dump at Bohain. From 14 December it was involved in reconstruction work and building reception camps at Cambrai. Demobilisation began in January 1919, and by 25 June the company had been reduced to a cadre, which returned to the UK.

=== 2nd Siege Company ===
This company (which referred to itself as No 2 Siege (Holyhead) Company) was mobilised at Beaumaris on 1 September 1914 under Capt (later Maj) C.E. Wilson. On 18 November it entrained at Menai Bridge railway station and went to Brompton Barracks, Chatham, for advanced engineer training. On 13 December it embarked at Southampton and landed at Le Havre next day. It arrived by train at Saint-Omer on 26 December and marched to Tatinghem, where it was assigned as 'Army Troops'.

It began work on 5 January 1915 on the St Omer–Wizernes road and associated trenches, moving by motor bus on 20 January to Kemmelhof Farm at Caëstre to work on the roads around Westoutre. This continued until 17 March when the company was ordered to Dickebusch, south of Ypres, to join V Corps. Together with about 400 Belgian civilian labourers the company was set to work on the Kruisstraathoek–Voormezele road. This ran just behind the lines at St Eloi, where there had been a German attack on 14–17 March and the sector was still active: the company had to carry out its work under fire. Helped by infantry working parties it constructed and wired a subsidiary line and communication trenches behind the threatened sector, and on 25 March began work on a new 'GHQ line' laid out by the chief engineer of V Corps further back.

==== Second Ypres ====
During the first weeks in April V Corps took over more of the line from the French, including the north-east side of the Ypres Salient. Much work had to be done on the front line defences left by the French, and it was this weak sector at the junction of the French and British armies that the Germans selected for their next attack on 22 April, the Second Battle of Ypres, which was preceded by the first ever poison gas discharge. By 24 April the situation was critical and a gap in the line appeared at St Julien. 28th Division was called on to help two Canadian battalions on its left, which were still holding the east side of the gap. The only troops available were the 2nd Siege Co, RARE, and two half companies of 8th Battalion, Middlesex Regiment, which were engaged in digging a fallback position behind the Canadians.Together with other units called in from digging a proposed 'switch line', the Canadian line was shored up by the end of the day. Confused fighting continued to 4 May. By then Maj Wilson had been evacuated wounded, and 2nd Siege Co had been withdrawn to erect wire entanglements in front of Zonnebeke under shellfire and suffering more casualties. As the fighting died down the company worked on trenches and dugouts for the new defence line, doing much of the work under cover of darkness and resting during the day.

It then began work in mid-May on a line dug along the canal embankment north of Ypres, made more difficult by the hasty defences previously dug by French infantry, who had dangerously undercut the embankment. Helped by Belgian civilians, the company rebuilt the line, with communication trenches and dugouts. In mid-June it handed over to the RMRE and was put to work repairing the vital Ypres–Vlamertinge road, and then the trenches south of the city. The sappers salvaged some steel girders, and used them to build platforms over a marshy stream to allow 3rd Division to push its artillery further forward. It continued working in the Ypres Salient for the rest of the year, on positions round Zonnebeke and Zillebeke, and on the GHQ (reserve) line, as well as road and bridge repairs. In December it began working on steel and concrete shelters for RGA batteries. On 3 January 1916 it moved to Dickebusch where it took over huts from 4th Siege Co, RARE. It formed a specialist railway section to build a light railway to move ammunition for V Corps' heavy artillery. Early 1916 was spent on gun emplacements and OPs for the RGA and the very heavy guns of the Royal Marine Artillery. In March it returned to repairing trenches, along the Ypres–Comines Canal at 'The Bluff', where it suffered a number of casualties.

==== Somme ====
On 26 March the company left the Ypres Salient after 14 months and went by train and road to Coigneux in the Somme sector. Here preparations were under way for that summer's 'Big Push' (the Battle of the Somme). The company was divided among the divisional sectors of VIII Corps and began work on wells, pumping stations and pipelines to supply water for the troop concentration in the dry Somme countryside. As the time for the offensive approached, the company had a section engaged in fixing leaks in the pipelines caused by enemy shellfire. On the First day on the Somme (1 July) the company was standing by to extend its pipelines forward. Although there was little advance, the sappers were kept busy repairing the waterworks, and suffered several casualties. As the fighting continued through July sections were taken off waterworks for road repair, bridging and building MGEs. XIV Corps took over the sector at the end of July and the company was used to construct dugouts, OPs and trench mortar emplacements (TMEs) in the front line, leaving one section to maintain the waterworks. At the beginning of October 2 Siege Co was transferred to XIII Corps and moved a short distance to Courcelles, working on roads and railway sidings. On 28 December the company moved to Doullens and took over from 135th Army Troops Co, RE. This involved running sawmills, maintaining and repairing workshops and hospitals, and building hutted camps.

In March 1917 the company returned to the Somme sector with II Corps which was engaged in operations on the Ancre Heights. The work included roadmaking and water supply, and casualties were numerous. However, during the month the Germans began their withdrawal to the Hindenburg Line (Operation Alberich), and on 28 March the company moved forward to the liberated town of Bapaume. Here the RE was heavily involved in repairing roads, railways and bridges across the devastated zone left by the enemy. As II Corps closed up to the Hindenburg Line, 2nd Siege Co's working parties reached Havrincourt Wood, where they worked on bridging the Canal du Nord as well as road and water works. The company remained based at Bapaume until November, working under I ANZAC Corps and later IV Corps, preparing for the next offensive.

==== Cambrai ====
On 20 November Third Army. launched the Battle of Cambrai and 2nd Siege Co moved the day before to La Boucherie, where it stood by to build bridges over the Canal du Nord once the northward section had been secured. The company together with the wagons from No 3 Pontoon Park could only struggle a short way down the crowded road to Demicourt, where No 10 Bridge was to be built, but next day (21 November) it began unloading the material for No 14 Bridge and reconnoitring the approaches to No 13. However, it still could not begin work on the bridges, and on 23 November the company was diverted to the urgent work of clearing the Hermies–Graincourt road. It continued on this until 7 December, by which time a German counter-attack had wiped out most of the British gains of November, including Graincourt. The company was moved back from Hermies to Vitry, where it began building a new camp and was bombed (without casualties). It then built its own camp at Thilloy, near Bapaume, moving to nearby Beugnâtre, where it stayed through the winter.

By January the company was working on IV Corps' defence lines in the new system of defence in depth, and on heavy artillery emplacements. When the German Spring Offensive began on 21 March 2nd Siege Co stood by ready to move at short notice. Next day its camp was rendered untenable by heavy shellfire and it moved back 300 yards (270 m) and dug in. It had been digging saps in the 'Army Line' (Rear Zone defences) near Mory, and on the night of 22/23 March it went up to finish these in case the infantry needed to fall back to that line. On 23 March it was sent with its tools to Bucquoy, where the Chief Engineer (CE) of IV Corps ordered it to begin work with three labour companies on a new defence line behind Bapaume. It completed this work just before the enemy was reported in Bapaume. On 25 March the company was ordered back from Bucquoy to Serre, where 51st (Highland) Division tried to use it in the firing line, but IV Corps refused this and it continued to Mailly-Maillet. Next morning German troops were reported to be at nearby Colincamps and the company prepared for action, with the Lewis guns deployed. However, the company was ordered back to Raincheval where CE IV Corps put it to work. On 28 March it was billeted in Pas, where some 3000 labourers were working on a new Army Line.

The enemy breakthrough was effectively halted on Third Army's front by 31 March, and 2nd Siege Co remained at Pas until 8 April. It then moved to Beaumetz-lès-Loges, near Arras, still working on the Army Line under occasional shellfire. It remained there for the next few months. On 9 June Major W. Oates relinquished command of the company to take over 4th Siege Co, RARE, and Capt H. Darby-Dowman was promoted to succeed him. By mid-June 2 Siege Co was entirely responsible for constructing the Red Line defences in VI Corps' area, supervising eight labour companies and the three battalions of 4th Guards Brigade. The company's work included reinforced concrete artillery OPs, MGEs and pillboxes, while deep dugouts were excavated using explosives placed in holes drilled by piledrivers or the Australian 'Wombat' drill.

The success of the Battle of Amiens meant that these defences would not be required, and on 24 August 2nd Siege Co was transferred to XVII Corps. It moved to Blaireville and then Henin-le-Cojeul to build bridges in support of the Allied advance. There is no information on the actions of 2nd Siege (Holyhead) Company, RARE, for the rest of the war, but at the Armistice it was serving as Army Troops with Third Army.

=== 3rd Railway Company ===
No 3 Railway Co RARE mobilised at Longmoor, embarked for France on 10 November 1914 and disembarked at Le Havre the following day. The company was delayed by difficulty in unloading the heavy lorries. The men went by train to Saint-Omer, arriving on 16 November and at first were employed in digging entrenchments on the bank of the Aire Canal. They continued digging trenches or draining ground in preparation for new trenches in the area of Blaringhem and Béthune, and at the 'Tuning Fork' at Festubert while the enemy was attacking La Bassée. Only on 18 February 1915 did the company do any railway work, when a detachment repaired a line near Beuvry station that was used by an armoured train. From late February the company laid cinder tracks for an aerodrome and repaired bridges. Finally it was told that it was required for railway work and on 20 March it left its billets at Bellerive and went to unload railway materials from ships at Boulogne and to work at the storage yard at Audruicq. From the end of April it was carrying out a variety of railway construction tasks. It continued serving under BEF Lines of Communication until the Armistice.

=== 4th Siege Company ===
The RARE raised its 4th Siege Company in November and December 1915, enlisting 350 skilled tradesmen in five weeks, mainly from the area around Sunderland in North-East England. They were assembled at Beaumaris and Maj N. Parrington took over command on 1 March 1916. Training was held up by the winter weather, but on 26 May the company took the boat to Bangor where it entrained for Southampton Docks. Next day it boarded the SS Caesarea and landed at Le Havre on 27 May. In early June Right Half Company was sent to take over the RE workshops at Rouen and Left Half to those at Abbeville. The workshops at Rouen were responsible for the maintenance of some 30 base depots and hospitals, those at Abbeville were smaller with fewer facilities and at first the men were mainly employed on road repair. The company remained on these duties until the end of 1917.

On 30 January 1918 the company joined III Corps. By May it was stationed at Ailly-sur-Somme, with LH Company at Seux, working on the GHQ Line including breastworks across the Somme marshes. Major W. Oates from 2nd Siege Co assumed command of the company on 10 June. The company continued working here and in the Forest of Ailly through the summer, until the day before the Battle of Amiens, when it was switched to water supply work at Boves and Cayeux. From the opening of the Battle of Albert (21 August) the company followed the advancing troops of Fourth Army across the old Somme battlefield repairing roads and bridges behind them, moving up through Henencourt, Fricourt, Montauban, Rancourt, Fourques, Vermand and Pontruet. From 11 September the company came under CE IX Corps. By October the company was working on roads in the forward area around Fresnoy, some of which were mined, and suffering a few casualties. At the time of the Armistice the company was building a bridge over the Sambre–Oise Canal at Petit Cambrésis, still under Fourth Army.

On 17 November the company was attached to the column formed by 3rd Brigade of 1st Division for the march to the Rhine. After being billeted in Belgium, the company's march got under way on 1 December. 1st Division entered Germany on 18 December, 4th Siege Co at Malmedy, where it rested until the end of the year, while IX Corps continued on to Euskirchen. On 31 December the company entrained for Euskirchen where it began duties as part of the Occupation of the Rhineland. Demobilisation got under way, and in June Maj Oates was posted to command 461st (West Riding) Field Co, RE, the equipment was returned to store, remaining personnel transferred to 567th (Devon) Army Troops Co, RE, and 4th Siege Company RARE was disbanded on 20 June 1919.

=== 5th Siege Company ===
5th Siege Company RARE was raised in late 1914 and by June 1915 it was at Gallipoli, serving under IX Corps' HQ. After the evacuation of the troops from Gallipoli, the company was in Egypt by January 1916, where it was assigned to Line of Communication duties with the Egyptian Expeditionary Force (EEF). Later the company served under the Western Frontier Force operating against the Senussi. These operations ended in April 1917 when the Senussi signed an agreement with the British and withdrew from Egypt.

==== Sinai & Palestine ====
The company was then reorganised as 5th Royal Anglesey Field Company (Note: The designation given in the order of battle. The unit officially referred to itself as 'No 5 Field Company, RARE', but other HQs used '5th (Anglesey) Field Company'.) and assigned as divisional engineers to the 74th (Yeomanry) Division. The EEF was forming this division from dismounted Yeomanry Cavalry regiments and whatever supporting troops could be found in the theatre (one of the other field companies was 5th Royal Monmouth, similarly formed from the RMRE). The company joined the division at Deir al-Balah on 14 April 1917. 74th (Y) Division went into action three days later in the Second Battle of Gaza, before it was fully formed, but although the division took a few casualties from enemy shellfire and aircraft attacks it remained in reserve. The EEF dug in on its new positions and active operations shut down for several months during which the new division continued its organisation and training.

Sir Edmund Allenby took over command of the EEF in May and began thorough preparations before launching the next offensive (the Third Battle of Gaza) on 27 October. There was a great deal of work for the engineers during this period, repairing and establishing roads and water sources. Leaving its tents standing, 74th (Y) Division began its approach march towards Beersheba on the night of 25/26 October and after the preliminary attacks began against Gaza City 74th (Y) Division attacked early on 31 October. Beersheba and its vital wells fell to the Desert Mounted Corps during the day, and 74th (Y) Division bivouacked on the battlefield. The division then began an advance into the hills next day, and on 6 November it attacked the Sheria Position. After bitter fighting Sheria and its water supply were captured next day, after which 74th (Y) Division did not take part in the pursuit but stayed behind to clear the battlefield. It was also issued with winter clothing for the coming operations in the Judaean Hills.

On 23 November 74th (Y) Division was ordered back to Gaza to join the advance towards Junction Station and on to Latrun. Soon the road became too steep and rough for wheeled transport, and while the troops fought a number of engagements at Beit Ur el Foka and Nebi Samwil the engineers spent much time repairing and improving the rough tracks through the hills. For much of the operations the division depended on camel transport: the official allocation to an RE field company was 69 camels, and food supplies were short. By 7 December the division's infantry were close to Jerusalem, but the artillery had been unable to keep up through the hills; however Jerusalem was captured without a fight on 9 December. A further advance to increase the security of the city was ordered, but it took 10 days of hard work to prepare the roads and improve the water supplies. 74th (Y) Division remade the track from Qaryet el 'Inab to Biddu, which had been impassable for wheeled vehicles: it took three infantry battalions working for several nights under the engineers to convert it into a roughly metalled road. The 'almost indistinguishable bridle-path' from Biddu past Nebi Samwil to Beit Hanina was also made fit to carry wheels. Heavy made rain made these roads impassable again for several days. As the EEF began its delayed operation on 27 December the Turks counter-attacked towards Jerusalem but were defeated by 30 December and the EEF had made further gains.

74th (Y) Division was withdrawn into reserve at Biddu and there was another pause in operations while the EEF's engineers carried out a large amount of roadbuilding. Jericho was captured in late February and the EEF advanced to the escarpment overlooking the Jordan Valley. 74th (Y) Division was then brought up for the next operation, against Tell 'Asur. It advanced on 8 March, and after tough fighting across rough country the position was secured by 12 March. The divisional engineers had to cut ramps to allow pack animals and artillery to climb some of the hills, as well as filling craters left by the enemy in the Nablus road (with an entire infantry brigade as a labour force) and laying water pipelines.

==== Western Front ====
The German Spring Offensive on the Western Front left the BEF in urgent need of reinforcements, and troops were sent from the EEF. 74th (Y) Division was warned on 3 April of an impending move to France; between 7 and 9 April it was relieved in the front line and by 13 April it had gone back to Lydda to concentrate. It then returned to Egypt, arriving at Qantara on 20 April. On 29 April it began embarking at Alexandria and sailed for Marseille, 5th Anglesey Field Co under Maj A. Glen aboard HM Transport Canberra. The unit disembarked on 7 May and next day entrained for Noyelles-sur-Mer. By 18 May the division had concentrated in the Abbeville district, with 5th Anglesey Field Co billeted at Bernay-en-Ponthieu, later moving to Ambrines near Doullens and then Fosseux near Arras. 74th (Y) Division now embarked on training for the fighting conditions on the Western Front, principally anti-gas defence; the field company also learned the latest techniques for entrenchments and wire entanglements and for pontoon bridging, and also formed a Lewis gun team. The company was attached to 231st Brigade Group. On 31 May 74th (Y) Division became part of the GHQ Reserve. During June 5 Anglesey Field Co began work on the GHQ Line as well as continuing training. On 26 June 74th (Y) Division moved to the Norrent-Fontes area, where it was at 4 hours' notice to reinforce either XI Corps or XIII Corps. 5th Anglesey Field Co moved to new billets at Bourecq, and work continued on the rear defences.

On 8 July the division received warning orders to go into the line near Merville under XI Corps in Fifth Army. 5th Anglesey Field Co moved into billets and dugouts at St Venant. Here the marshy ground precluded trenches, and most of the defences consisted of breastworks; the company had a section from 196th Land Drainage Company attached to it. It was still working on defence systems and dugouts and preparing explosive charges to destroy bridges in the event of another German breakthrough. But the Allies were preparing a counter-offensive. The company began transporting large quantities of engineer stores up to the forward areas, and on the night of 7/8 August it was ordered to build two footbridges over the River Lys. Although Fifth Army's front was distant from the fighting when the Battle of Amiens launched the Hundred Days Offensive next morning, patrols from 74th (Y) Division found the enemy withdrawing from their frontline positions. 230th Brigade used these footbridges as it cautiously followed up, while 5th (Anglesey) Field Co began building more bridges for pack animals and wheeled vehicles, moving company HQ forward to the partially fortified buildings of 'White House Farm'. Over the following days the company reconnoitred roadways that would be needed if the advance continued, while Maj Glen acted as CRE of the division from 11 August. On 12 August White House Farm was bombarded, mainly with mustard gas shells, and a number of the sappers had to be evacuated to hospital. On 18 August the company handed over to 439th (2/1st Cheshire) Field Co and went into divisional reserve at St Venant, where it erected bath houses and dressing stations. Meanwhile, large fires could be seen as the Germans destroyed supplies they could not evacuate.

On 27 August the company went by motor lorries to St Quentin outside Aire-sur-la-Lys and on the evening of 28 August it entrained as 74th (Y) Division began moving south to enter the main Allied offensive. It joined III Corps of Fourth Army in time to participate in the final stages of the Second Battle of Bapaume (2–3 September). 5th (Anglesey) Field Co camped with 231st Bde Group near Maricourt, and then followed the advance towards the Hindenburg Line, preparing watering points for men and horses along the River Somme and erecting Nissen huts for Divisional HQ. On 17 September it was put on 30 minutes' notice to move as 74th (Y) Division prepared to attack next day (the Battle of Épehy). During the attack the company repaired captured dugouts for 231st Bde. Afterwards, 74th (Y) Division was relieved and on 24 September the company began a two-day march to Villers-Bretonneux where the division was to rejoin XI Corps in Fifth Army.

On 28 September the company went by train and road to La Vallée near Chocques where 74th (Y) Division went back into the line. The Allies were carrying out a series of coordinated attacks along the whole front, forcing the Germans to retreat, and although Fifth Army did not put in a major attack it was able to take part in the pursuit. 5th (Anglesey) Field Co followed up as far as La Cliqueterie Farm, west of Herlies, where it repaired roads and huts, and made use of abandoned German water pumps and engineering supplies. On 15 October it collected pontoons, cork floats and bridging material, and when the division forced the Haute Deûle Canal two days later the company immediately moved up to bridge it at Haubourdin. The pontoon wagons were brought up 'at the double' and the first bridge was complete 25 minutes after the first wagon arrived. The company laid further cork and pontoon bridges over the canal, and then was ordered to begin a heavy trestle bridge. This was completed at midnight on 18/19 October, the whole bridge made from captured German material. The company then moved up to Baisieux, where it filled cratered roads and secured captured material, including timber for a trestle bridge that would be required over the River Escaut when Tournai had been captured. It also prepared rafts and scaling ladders for the assault crossing of the river. Patrols of 231st Bde entered the western part of Tournai on 8 November, finding all the bridges destroyed as expected. By 09.00 next morning 5th (Anglesey) Field Co had thrown a cork bridge over the Escaut and 10th (Shropshire and Cheshire Yeomanry) Battalion, King's Shropshire Light Infantry, crossed it and entered the eastern half of the city. Preparations for the heavy trestle bridge began, but this was cancelled, and the company resumed its forward march, dealing with heavily cratered roads, until the Armistice came into force on 11 November.

On 15 November III Corps, including 74th (Y) DIvision, was ordered to join Second Army for the advance to Germany as part of the Occupation of the Rhineland, but this was cancelled on 21 November and the division remained in Belgium. It was employed repairing the Tournai–Leuze railway, with 5th (Anglesey) Field Co based at Verlaine to rebuild two of the bridges. In mid-December the division moved to the East Flanders area, with 231st Bde Group at Grammont, where 5th (Anglesey) Field Co worked on improving the billets. Demobilisation got under way in January 1919, and by the end of May the company had been reduced to a cadre of 1 officer and 36 ORs. 5th (Anglesey) Field Company, RARE, was disbanded on 28 June 1919.

== Postwar ==
The SR resumed its old title of Militia in 1921 but like most militia units the Royal Anglesey RE remained in abeyance after World War I, whereas the Royal Monmouth RE was reformed, becoming part of the Supplementary Reserve in 1924 and continuing to this day. The Militia was formally disbanded in April 1953.

== Commanders ==
The following served as commanding officer of the unit:

- Capt Herbert Jones of Llynon, 26 March 1778
- Lt-Col William Peacock, 28 February 1781
- Capt Herbert Jones reinstated 1782
- Capt William Evans of Glanalaw, 23 January 1793
- Maj Hon Arthur Paget, 20 February 1795 (Lt-Col from 10 March 1798)
- Maj William Lewis Hughes of Lleiniog, later Lord Dinorben, 18 April 1803
- Lt-Col Thomas Peers Williams of Craig-y-Don, 10 March 1853 (joint Lt-Col Commandant 1860–67)
- Lt-Col William H. Thomas (former Captain in the 49th Foot) 10 May 1876
- Lt-Col Thomas Hampton-Lewis of Henllys (former Captain in the 5th Dragoon Guards) 14 August 1878
- Lt-Col Sir Richard Williams-Bulkeley, 12th Baronet 10 February 1897
- Lt-Col Charles Matthews-Donaldson (retired Major) 19 October 1905

=== Honorary Colonels ===
The following served as Honorary Colonel of the regiment:

- Thomas Hampton-Lewis (former CO) appointed 17 October 1891
- Sir Richard Williams-Bulkeley, Bt (former CO) appointed 11 March 1912

== Heritage & ceremonial ==
=== Uniforms & insignia ===
Early trained bands were probably not clothed in uniforms, but the Anglesey levies for Ireland in 1601 were issued with caps, cassocks, doublets, breeches, netherstocks, shoes and shirts.

When the Duke of Beaufort inspected the Anglesey Militia in 1684, the Troop of Horse carried a standard of 'crimson flowered damask with gold silk fringe and tassels', while the Foot Companies carried blue colours except the Beaumaris Company whose colour was red.

From 1762 to 1860 the uniform was of the same pattern as the regulars, the red coat having blue facings. From 1860, when amalgamated with the Royal Carnarvon Rifles, the regiment wore a Rifle green uniform with red facings, but reverted to red with blue facings when it regained its independence as light infantry in 1867. The original Regimental colour from ca 1763 bore in the centre the Coat of arms of the Lord Lieutenant of the county (at the time Sir Nicholas Bayly, 2nd Baronet). However, when the colour was replaced in ca 1804 it had the Prince of Wales's feathers, coronet, and motto scroll Ich Dien, with the regimental title beneath. Colours were not carried 1860–67 when it was a Rifle regiment, nor after 1877 when it was part of the Royal Engineers.

The Anglesey Local Militia of 1809–16 also wore red jackets with blue facings. As an official organisation, unlike the earlier volunteers, the battalion was issued with a regimental colour. The shoulder belt plate bore the Prince of Wales's feathers, coronet and motto scroll inside an oval garter inscribed 'PRO ARIS ET FOCIS' ('For hearth and home'), surmounted by a crown and with the letters 'R.A.L.M.' beneath. This suggests that the unit referred to itself as the 'Royal Anglesey Local Militia', though there is no evidence that it was entitled to the 'Royal' prefix. As an extension of the Royal Anglesey Militia, the prefix may have been simply assumed; other Welsh local militia units did the same.

The RALI officers' Shako plate from 1844 (and probably earlier) and shoulder belt plate from 1854 used the device of the Prince of Wales's feathers, coronet and motto scroll inside a garter inscribed 'ROYAL ANGLESEY LIGHT INF.', with a crown above and light infantry bugle-horn suspended below; on the shako plate this badge within a laurel wreath was superimposed on a crowned cut star. The officers' waistbelt clasp and all ranks' buttons had the Prince of Wales's feathers, coronet, motto and suspended bugle horn surrounded by the full wording 'ROYAL ANGLESEY LIGHT INFANTRY'. The badge worn on the ORs' Glengarry cap until 1877 had a Druid's head, with a spray of oak leaves and acorns on either side, superimposed on a bugle horn.

Around 1880 the officers of the Royal Anglesey Engineers Militia wore a waistbelt clasp (and possibly an undress forage cap badge) comprising the Druid's head and oak sprays surmounted by the Prince of Wales's insignia, with scroll beneath inscribed 'M{O}N MAM CYMRU' ('Mona Mother of Wales'). The Home Service helmet carried the standard RE plate with the addition of the word 'MILITIA' to the scroll.

=== Precedence ===
During the War of American Independence the county militia regiments were given an order of precedence determined by ballot each year. However, units such as the Anglesey Militia that did not constitute a full battalion were not included. Having been increased to battalion strength by Peacocke's companies, Anglesey was included from 1781, when it was drawn as 4th. The following year it was 7th. The order balloted for at the start of the French Revolutionary War in 1793 remained in force throughout the war; Anglesey was again left out. Another ballot for precedence took place in 1803 at the start of the Napoleonic War and remained in force until 1833: Anglesey was 69th. In 1833 the King drew the lots for individual regiments and the resulting list continued in force with minor amendments until the end of the militia. The regiments raised before the peace of 1763 took the first 47 places but the Anglesey Militia raised in 1762 were included in the second group (1763–83), presumably because they were not actually embodied until 1778. They became 61st. When the Royal Anglesey amalgamated with the Royal Carnarvon in 1860, the combined unit inherited the latter's precedence of 56th. The RALI then reverted to 61st until it became Royal Engineers Militia, when the RARE ranked 2nd (out of two) after the Royal Monmouthshire.

== See also ==
- Trained Bands
- Militia (English)
- Militia (Great Britain)
- Militia (United Kingdom)
- Royal Engineers
- Royal Monmouthshire Royal Engineers
