= Anick =

Village in Northumberland, England

Coordinates: 54.98°N 02.07°W

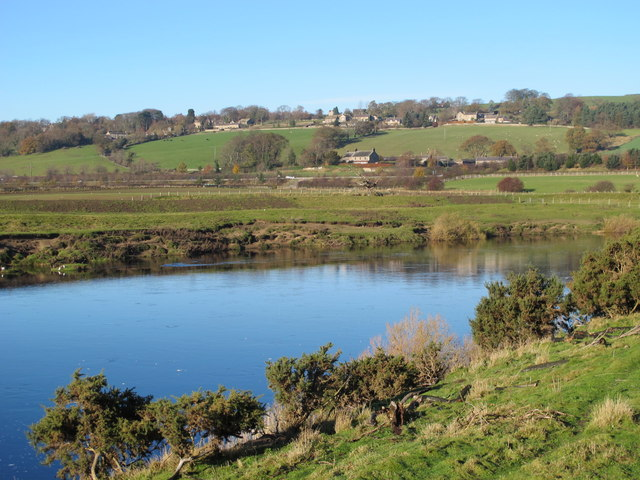
- View of Anick from across the River Tyne

- Location within Northumberland
- OS grid reference: NY955655
- Civil parish: Sandhoe
- Unitary authority: Northumberland
- Ceremonial county: Northumberland
- Region: North East
- Country: England
- Sovereign state: United Kingdom
- Post town: HEXHAM
- Postcode district: NE46
- Dialling code: 01434
- Police: Northumbria
- Fire: Northumberland
- Ambulance: North East
- UK Parliament: Hexham

Anick (/ˈeɪnɪk/ AY-nik) is a village and former civil parish, now in the parish of Sandhoe, in Northumberland, England, situated to the north of Hexham. In 1881 the parish had a population of 153.

Anick should not be confused with the much larger town of Alnwick (pronounced /ˈænɪk/), which is also in Northumberland, but some 35 miles (56 km) further north.

== Governance ==
Anick was formerly a township in St. John Lee parish. From 1866 Anick was a civil parish in its own right until it was abolished on 24 March 1887 and merged with Sandhoe.
