= Thomas Bulkeley, 7th Viscount Bulkeley =

British politician

The Right Honourable The Viscount Bulkeley
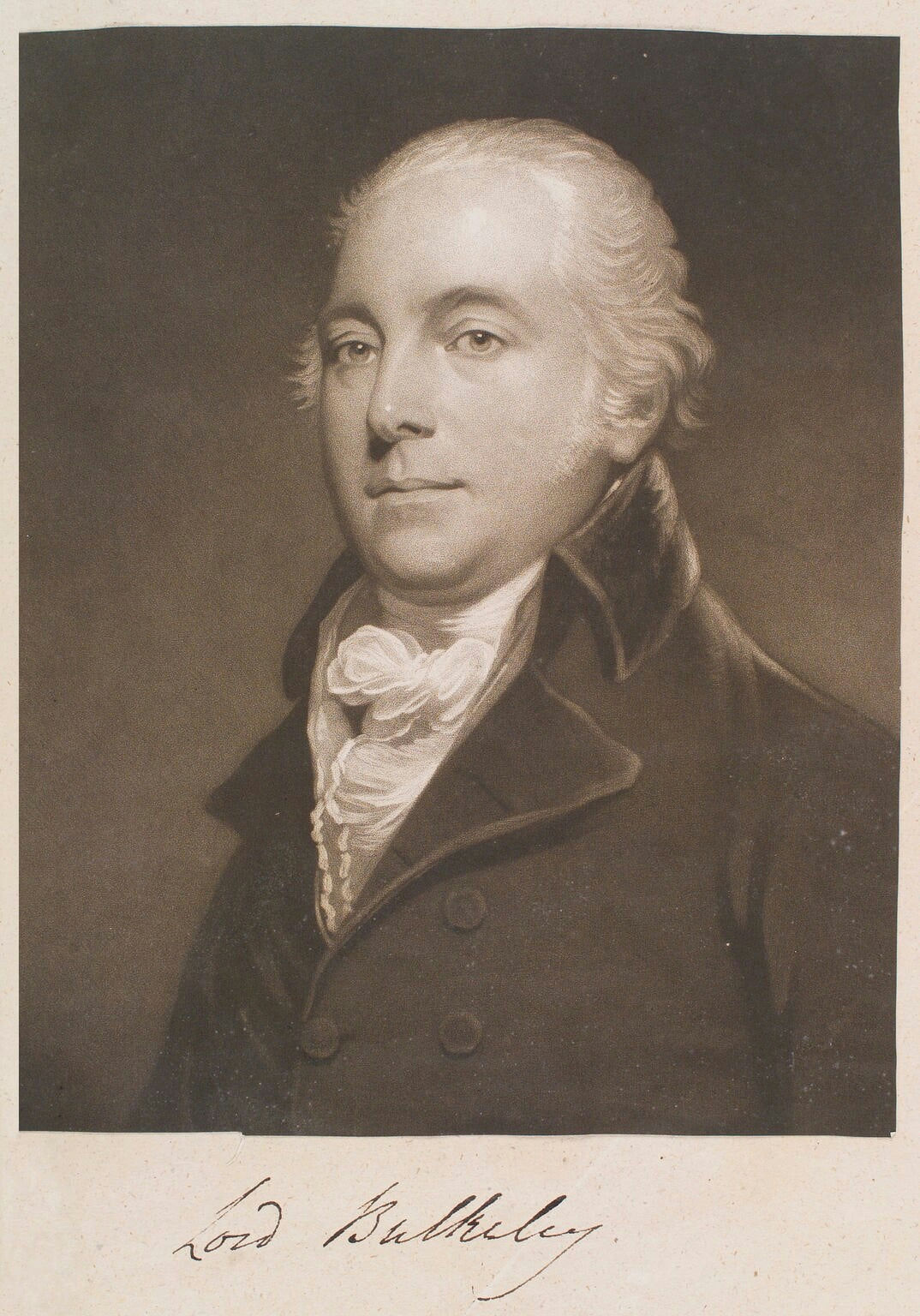

Lord Lieutenant of Caernarvonshire
- In office 1781–1822
- Preceded by: The Lord Newborough
- Succeeded by: Thomas Assheton Smith

Member of Parliament for Anglesey
- In office 1774–1784
- Preceded by: Sir Nicholas Bayly, Bt
- Succeeded by: Nicholas Bayly

Personal details
- Born: Thomas James Bulkeley; 12 December 1752
- Died: 3 June 1822 (aged 69)
- Spouse: Elizabeth Harriet Warren (m. 1777; died 1822)
- Relations: Sir Robert Williams, 9th Baronet (half-brother)
- Parent: James Bulkeley, 6th Viscount Bulkeley
- Education: Jesus College, Oxford

Thomas James Bulkeley, 7th Viscount Bulkeley, later Warren-Bulkeley, (12 December 1752 – 3 June 1822) was a Welsh aristocrat and politician who sat in the House of Commons from 1774 to 1784 when he was raised to the peerage.

== Early life ==
Thomas James Bulkeley was the posthumous son and heir to James Bulkeley, 6th Viscount Bulkeley, who died aged 35 in 1752, and Emma Rowlands, daughter and heiress of Thomas Rowlands of Caerau, Caernarvonshire. In 1760, his mother married Sir Hugh Williams, 8th Baronet, MP for Beaumaris from 1768 to 1780 and from 1785 to 1794. From his mother's second marriage, he had two half-sisters and two half-brothers, including Sir Robert Williams, 9th Baronet.

He was educated as fellow commoner at Jesus College, Oxford, before making the Grand Tour with the Marquess of Buckingham; he gave a copy of Guido Reni's St Michael subduing the Devil, acquired in Rome, to Jesus College chapel.

== Career ==
Like several of his ancestors, Bulkeley became member of parliament for the county of Anglesey, returned in 1774 and 1780. Though he voted against Fox's East India Bill in 1783, he attended a 1784 meeting of the St. Alban's Tavern group of MPs interested in uniting Fox and Pitt. In May 1784 he was created an English peer, Baron Bulkeley, of Beaumaris and had to vacate his seat in the House of Commons.

Bulkeley supported Pitt on the regency question in 1788. He spoke in the Lords on the election treating act in 1796. He opposed the 'Adultery bill' in 1800. In the 1806 impeachment trial of Viscount Melville, Bulkeley voted Melville guilty on the sixth and seventh charges.

During the French Revolutionary War he raised the 'Loyal Anglesea (sic) Volunteers' of four companies in 1797 and commanded them as Major-Commandant until they was stood down after the Peace of Amiens in 1802. When the peace broke down in 1803 he re-raised the unit as the Anglesey Loyal Volunteers of two battalions and commanded them with the rank of Colonel. When the volunteers declined after the crisis was over, Bulkeley and most of his officers transferred to the Anglesey Local Militia in 1809.

=== Beaumaris Castle ===
Lord Bulkeley bought Beaumaris Castle from the Crown in 1807 for £735, incorporating it into the park that surrounded his local residence, Baron Hill. Some of the castle's stones may have been reused in 1829 to build the nearby Beaumaris Gaol.

== Personal life ==
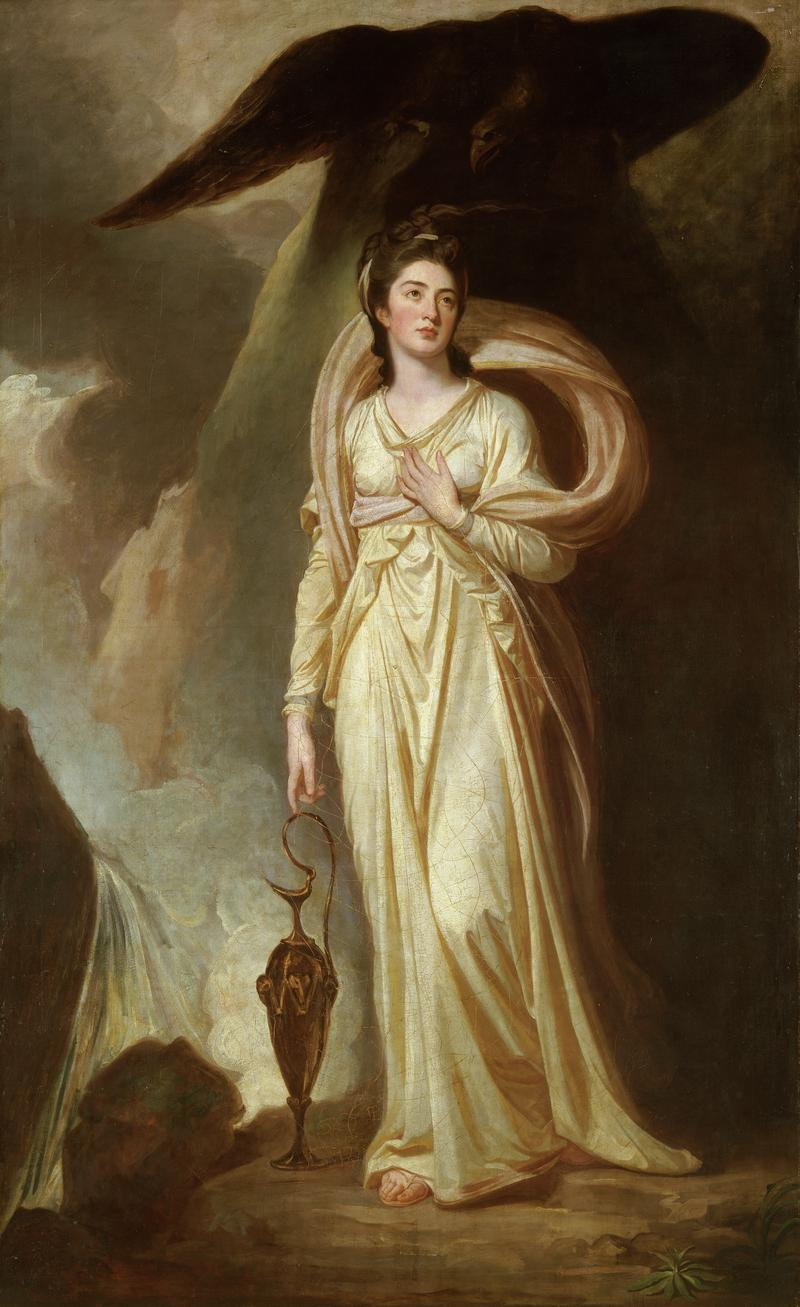
Painting of his wife, Viscountess Bulkeley, as Hebe, by George Romney, c. 1776

On 26 April 1777 he married Elizabeth Harriet Warren, only daughter and heir of Sir George Warren. In 1802 Bulkeley legally changed his name by Royal Licence to Thomas James Warren-Bulkeley.

He died without issue in 1822 in Englefield Green. His estate was inherited by his nephew, Sir Richard Williams, 10th Baronet (the son of his half-brother), who assumed the additional surname of Bulkeley, by Royal licence. His wife died in 1832; her will left property to a relation George Fleming Leicester, under the condition he change his surname to Warren.

=== Legacy ===
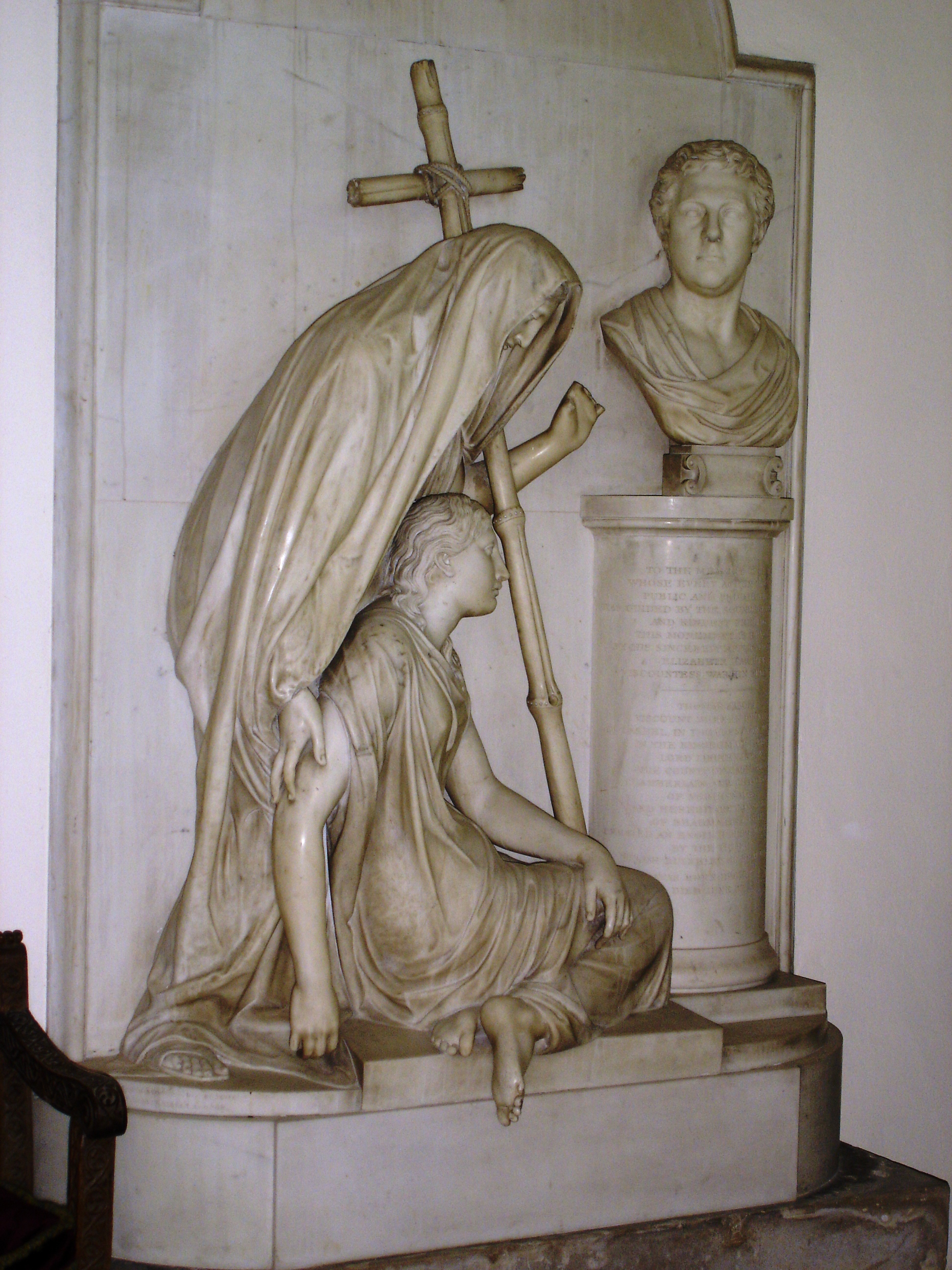
Bulkeley's memorial in St Mary's, Beaumaris

The chancel north wall of St Mary's and St Nicholas's Church, Beaumaris contains a medieval brass plaque and a monument to Bulkeley.

== Sources ==
- Taylor, Arnold (2004) [1980], Beaumaris Castle (5th ed.), Cardiff, UK: Cadw, ISBN 1-85760-208-0

Parliament of Great Britain
Preceded by Sir Nicholas Bayly, Bt	Member of Parliament for Anglesey; 1774–1784	Succeeded by Nicholas Bayly
Honorary titles
Preceded by The Lord Newborough	Lord Lieutenant of Caernarvonshire; 1781–1822	Succeeded by Thomas Assheton Smith
Peerage of Ireland
Preceded by James Bulkeley	Viscount Bulkeley; 1752–1822	Extinct
Peerage of Great Britain
New creation	Baron Bulkeley; 1784–1822	Extinct
