= Sir Hugh Williams, 8th Baronet =

Welsh soldier and Member of Parliament (1718 - 1794)

Lieutenant-Colonel Sir Hugh Williams Bt

Member of Parliament for Beaumaris
- In office 1785–1794
- Preceded by: Hon. Hugh Fortescue
- Succeeded by: Sir Watkin Williams-Wynn
- In office 1768–1780
- Preceded by: Richard Thelwall Price
- Succeeded by: Sir George Warren

Personal details
- Born: Hugh Williams; 1718
- Died: 19 August 1794 (aged 75–76)
- Spouse(s): Emma née Rowlands, Viscountess Bulkeley (m. 1760; died 1770)
- Relations: Viscount Bulkeley
- Children: Sir Robert Williams
- Parent(s): Colonel Griffith Williams; Mary née Williams

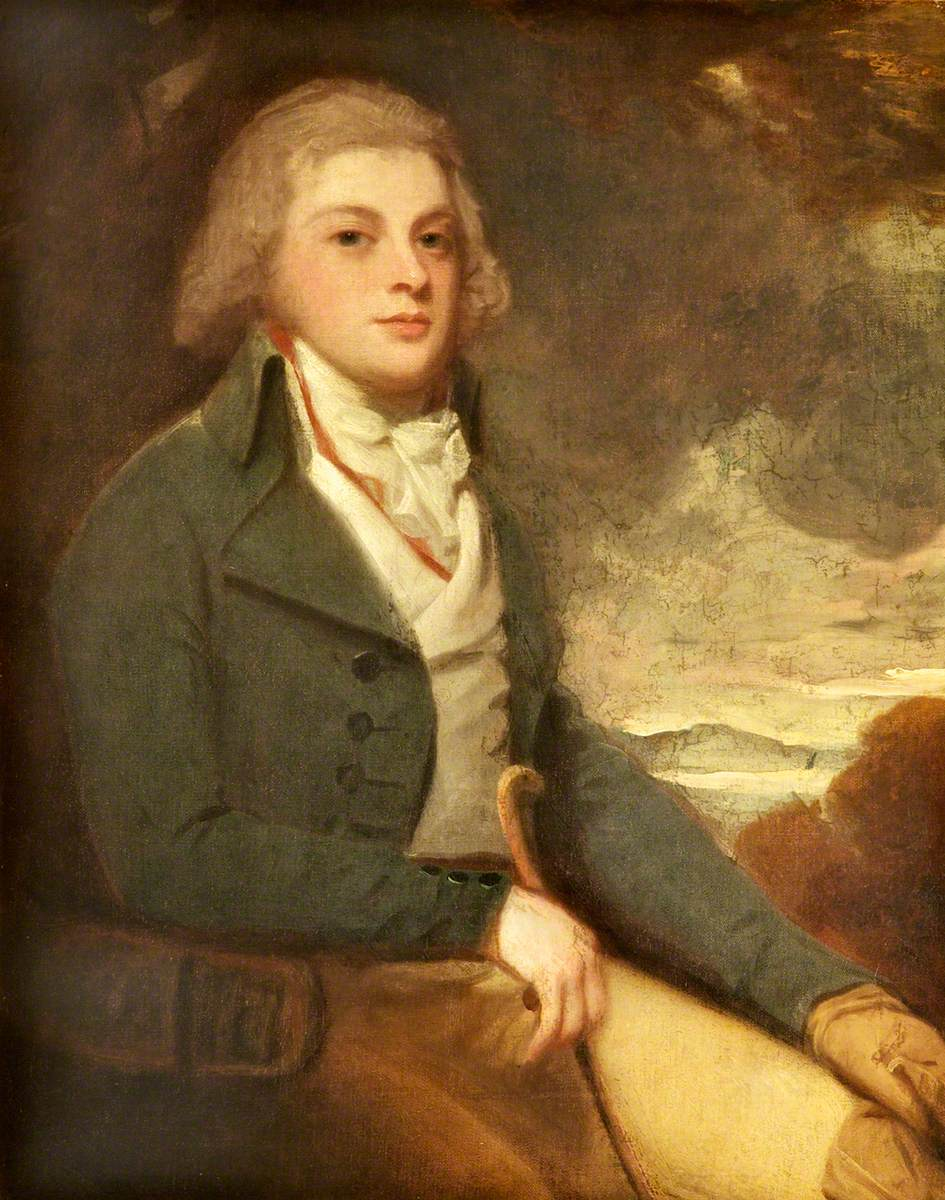

Sir Hugh Williams, 8th Baronet (1718 – 19 August 1794), was a British Army officer and landowner in Wales, who sat in the House of Commons between 1768 and 1794.

== Early life ==
Born in 1718, the son of Colonel Griffith Williams of Arianws, near Llangelynnin, Caernarvonshire and, his wife, Mary, daughter of Robert Williams, he was commissioned into the British Army in 1739.

Promoted Captain in the 34th Foot in 1744, he succeeded to the baronetcy on the death of his cousin Sir Robert Williams, 7th Baronet, in November 1745.

== Career ==
In 1756 Sir Hugh was a Major in the 6th Foot at Menorca when the garrison was attacked in that year. In 1759 Williams was serving in a Volunteer Battalion of the 85th Foot.

Correspondence indicates that Sir Hugh was becoming involved in politics in Beaumaris, partly in the interest of his stepson Thomas Bulkeley, but was hindered by the secrecy of his marriage (due to his father-in-law's disapproval of Williams).

In the course of these dealings, he was promoted Lieutenant Colonel of the 53rd Foot in 1761 and appointed Constable of Beaumaris Castle in July 1761. However, his regiment being stationed at Gibraltar, Williams was ordered to return to military duties on the European continent. Williams disliked the climate and requested to be transferred to a regiment at home. As this was refused Sir Hugh retired from the Army on half-pay in December 1764 to take care of affairs at Beaumaris.

=== Political career ===
In 1768 Williams was elected Member of Parliament for Beaumaris but made little contribution. His stepson Thomas Bulkeley joined him in Parliament in 1774 and was encouraging him to take a greater interest. However he found parliamentary business tiresome and stood down in 1780.

Returned as MP for Beaumaris at a by-election in 1785 Williams retained the seat until his death on 19 August 1794.

== Personal life ==
Sir Hugh married Emma Bridget (née Rowlands), dowager Viscountess Bulkeley, widow of James Bulkeley, 6th Viscount Bulkeley on 28 June 1760. She was the only daughter and heiress of Thomas Rowlands of Caerau, Anglesey, but as her father disapproved of Williams, the marriage was kept secret.

Sir Hugh and Lady Williams (aka Bulkeley) had two sons and two daughters, including:

- Sir Robert Williams, 9th Baronet (1764–1830), who married Anne (died 1837), daughter of the Rev. Edward Lewis Hughes, in 1799.

Sir Hugh died on 19 August 1794, being succeeded in the baronetcy by his eldest son Robert.

== Sources ==
- Leigh Rayment's list of baronets

Parliament of Great Britain
Preceded by Richard Thelwall Price	Member of Parliament for Beaumaris; 1768–1780	Succeeded by Sir George Warren
Preceded by Hon. Hugh Fortescue	Member of Parliament for Beaumaris; 1785-1794	Succeeded by Sir Watkin Williams-Wynn
Baronetage of England
Preceded by Robert Williams	Baronet (of Penrhyn); 1745–1794	Succeeded by Robert Williams
