= Errington baronets =

Set index for Errington baronets

There have been two baronetcies for the surname Errington, both in the Baronetage of the United Kingdom. As of 2026 one is extant.

- Errington baronets of Lackham Manor (1885): see Sir George Errington, 1st Baronet (1839–1920)
- Errington baronets of Ness (1963)

== See also ==
- Stanley baronets of Hooton (1661), later Stanley-Massey-Stanley, later Errington baronets
