= Sir Robert Williams, 9th Baronet =

British politician

Sir Robert Williams
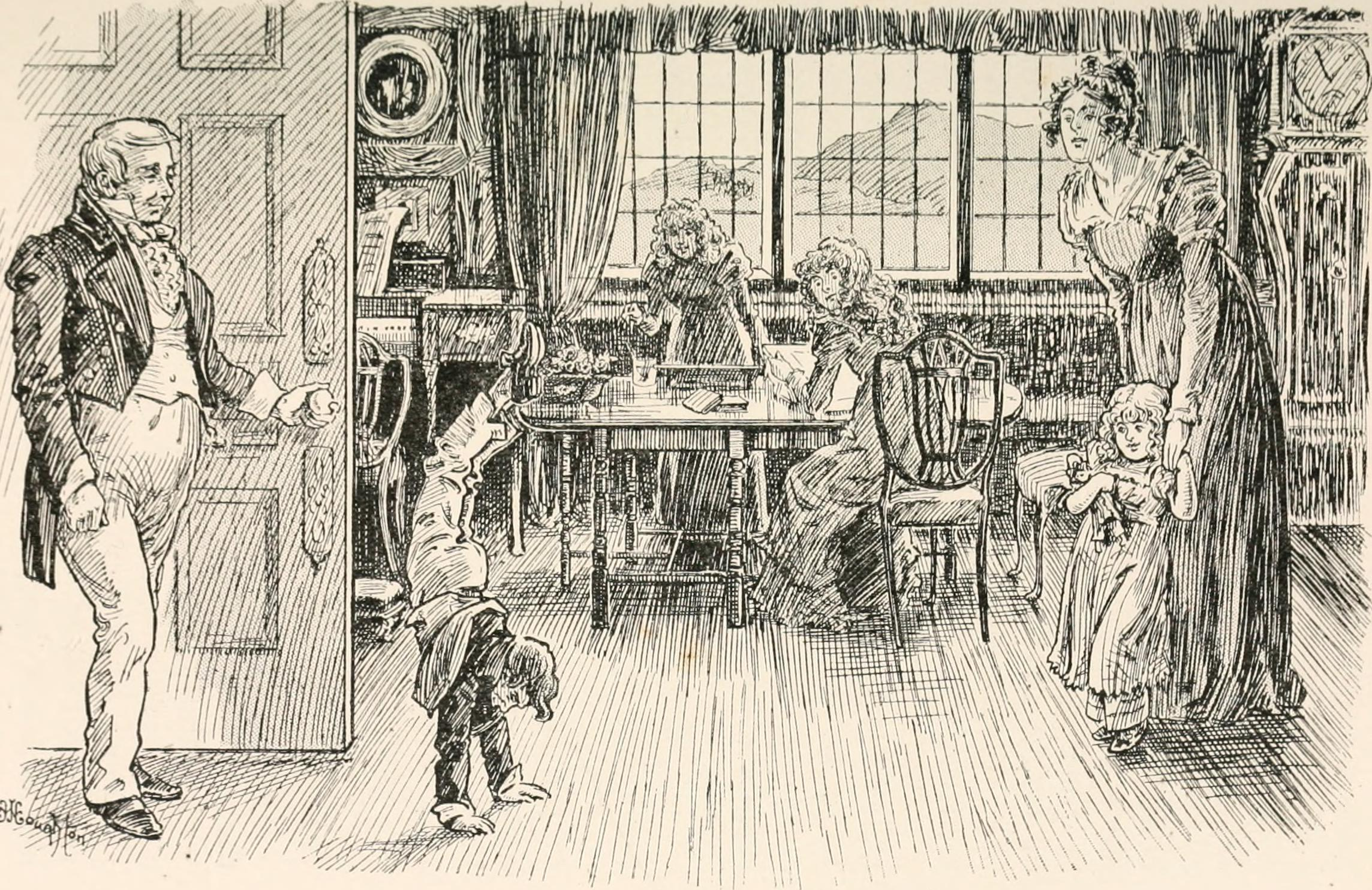
- Sir Robert and Lady Williams at Fryars. A visiting child Henry Keppel entertains them with a handstand.

Member of Parliament for Beaumaris
- In office 1826–1831

Member of Parliament for Caernarvonshire
- In office 1790–1826

Personal details
- Born: 20 July 1764
- Died: 1 December 1830 (aged 66) Nice, France
- Spouse: Anne Lewis (m. 1799)
- Children: 2+, including Richard
- Parent: Sir Hugh Williams (father)
- Relatives: John Eardley-Wilmot (son-in-law)

Sir Robert Williams, 9th Baronet (20 July 1764 – 1 December 1830) was a British politician who sat in the House of Commons from 1790 to 1830.

== Biography ==
Williams was the son of Sir Hugh Williams, 8th Baronet and his wife Emma Rowland.

Williams was elected Member of Parliament for Caernarvonshire in 1790 and held the seat until 1826. He was then elected MP for Beaumaris and held the seat until his death in 1830.

During the invasion crisis of 1803 he raised and commanded the 'Loyal Snowden (sic) Riflemen' in Caernarfonshire as a Captain and was also a Major in the Anglesey Loyal Volunteers under Colonel Viscount Bulkeley. When the volunteers declined he followed Bulkeley and most of the other Loyal Volunteer officers in transferring to the Anglesey Local Militia in 1809.

Williams died at Nice, France at the age of 66.

Williams married Anne Lewis, daughter of Reverend Edward Hughes and Mary Lewis, on 11 June 1799. Their son Richard succeeded to the baronetcy, whilst their daughter Eliza Martha married Sir John Eardley-Wilmot, 2nd Baronet.

Parliament of Great Britain
Preceded by John Parry	Member of Parliament for Caernarvonshire; 1790–1800	Succeeded by Parliament of the United Kingdom
Parliament of the United Kingdom
Preceded by Parliament of Great Britain	Member of Parliament for Caernarvonshire; 1801–1826	Succeeded by Sir Thomas John Wynn, Bt
Preceded by Thomas Frankland Lewis	Member of Parliament for Beaumaris; 1826–1831	Succeeded by Sir Richard Williams-Bulkeley, Bt
Baronetage of England
Preceded by Hugh Williams	Baronet (of Penrhyn); 1794–1830	Succeeded by Richard Williams-Bulkeley
