= Stanley baronets of Hooton (1661) =

The Stanley, later Stanley-Massey-Stanley, later Errington baronetcy, of Hooton in the County of Chester, was created in the Baronetage of England on 17 June 1661 for William Stanley, the great-grandson of Sir William Stanley, of Hooton and Stourton, a member of the Stanley family headed by the Earl of Derby. He had married in 1651 Mary Molyneux, daughter of Richard Molyneux, 1st Viscount Molyneux. The 6th Baronet assumed the surname Stanley-Massey-Stanley.

The 9th Baronet married Mary Haggerston, great-niece and heiress of Henry Errington of Sandhoe House, Northumberland. Their eldest son, the 10th Baronet, represented Pontefract in Parliament from 1837 to 1841. Their second son, Rowland Stanley, the 11th Baronet, inherited the Errington estate in Northumberland and changed his name and arms to Errington. The title became extinct on the death of the 12th Baronet in 1893.

== Stanley, later Stanley-Massey-Stanley, later Errington baronets, of Hooton (1661) ==
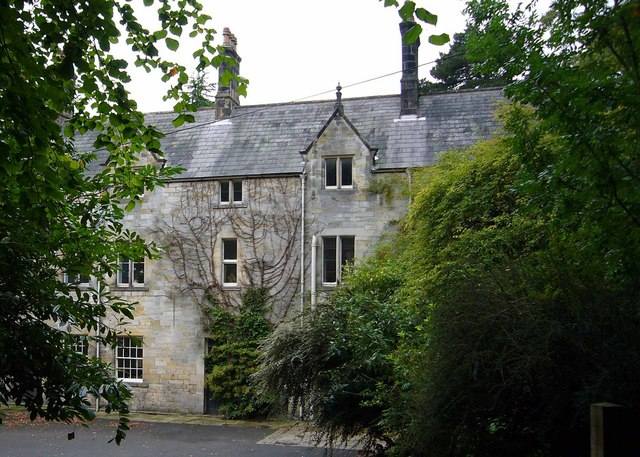
Sandhoe Hall, Northumberland, built in 1850 by Sir Rowland Errington, 11th Baronet

- Sir William Stanley, 1st Baronet (1628–1673)
- Sir Rowland Stanley, 2nd Baronet (1653–1737)
- Sir William Stanley, 3rd Baronet (1679–1740)
- Sir Rowland Stanley, 4th Baronet (1707–1771)
- Sir William Stanley, 5th Baronet (c.1753–1792)
- Sir John Stanley-Massey-Stanley, 6th Baronet (1711–1794)
- Sir Thomas Stanley-Massey-Stanley, 7th Baronet (c.1755–1795)
- Sir William Stanley-Massey-Stanley, 8th Baronet (c.1780–1800)
- Sir Thomas Stanley-Massey-Stanley, 9th Baronet (1782–1841)
- Sir William Thomas Stanley-Massey-Stanley, 10th Baronet (1806–1863)
- Sir Rowland Errington, 11th Baronet (1809–1875)
- Sir John Errington, 12th Baronet (1810–1893)

Coat of arms of Stanley, later Stanley-Massey-Stanley, later Errington of Hooton
Crest a unicorn's head erased argent armed and maned or. Escutcheon Argent, two bars azure, in chief three escallops of the last.
