= Sandhoe Hall =

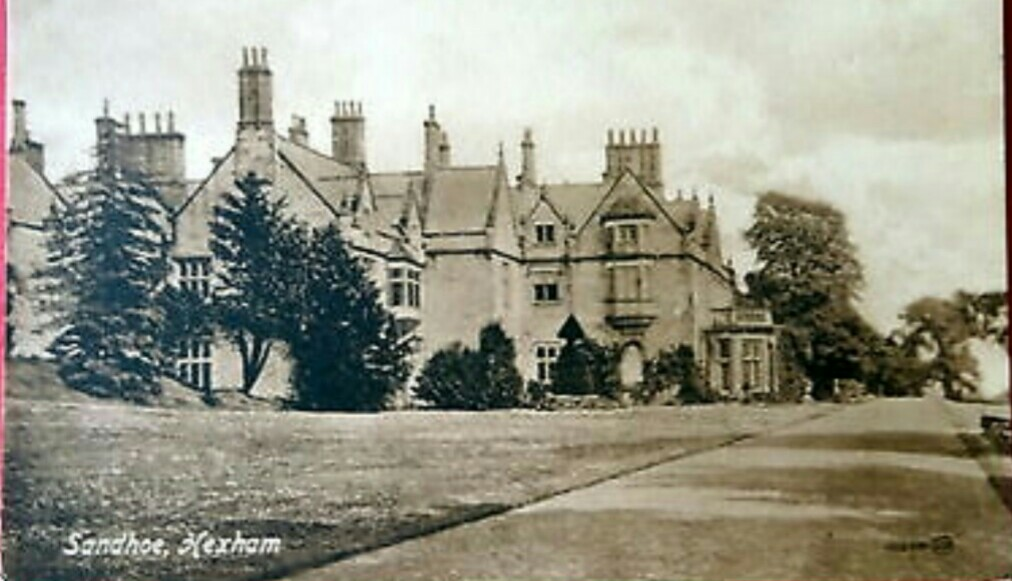
- A picture of Sandhoe Hall

- Location in Northumberland

General information
- Location: Northumberland, England, UK
- Coordinates: 54.990°N 2.049°W
- OS grid: NY963659

Sandhoe Hall, also once known as Sandhoe House, is a 19th-century country house situated at Sandhoe, Northumberland. It is a Grade II listed building.

The Sandhoe estate was owned by the Errington family of nearby Beaufront, but when Henry Errington died childless in 1819, it passed to his great-grandnephew Rowland Stanley of Puddington Hall, Cheshire, son of Sir Thomas Stanley Bt (see Errington baronets). Stanley changed his name to Errington. He was High Sheriff of Northumberland in 1855 and became the 11th Errington Baronet in 1863.

In 1850 he commissioned architect John Dobson to rebuild the old house. The south and east fronts are four-bayed with two storeys and alternately gabled attics. The northwest service wing incorporates some of the fabric of the original house. The house had another wing in the 19th century on the left when viewed from the front ( see old photo below ) its outline can be traced on the northwest service wing. It now forms part of a courtyard and stable house.

Typically Victorian, its front is offset with a utilitarian design and layout to the northwest servants wing. The original house is described as being in the Elizabethan style with Dobson building chimneys with an Elizabethan height to them but in a Victorian style. It would be interesting to know what the original house looked like.

The main entrance gate, built later than the house around 1870, is in a heavy rusticated style with fleur-de-lys cast-iron door furniture and ashlar dressings with Gothic touches- a motto "virtue" appears above the main gate, with pedestrian access gates adjacent. The grounds contain a monument in the form of a cross approximately four metres high. Points of interest in the house include heraldic stained-glass windows and drainpipes with stone carved lions heads above them. The grounds have terraced gardens on the slope the house is situated on, with a large fountain, a tennis court and an ice house.
