= Sandhoe =

Hamlet in Northumberland, England

Coordinates: 54°59′29″N 2°02′54″W

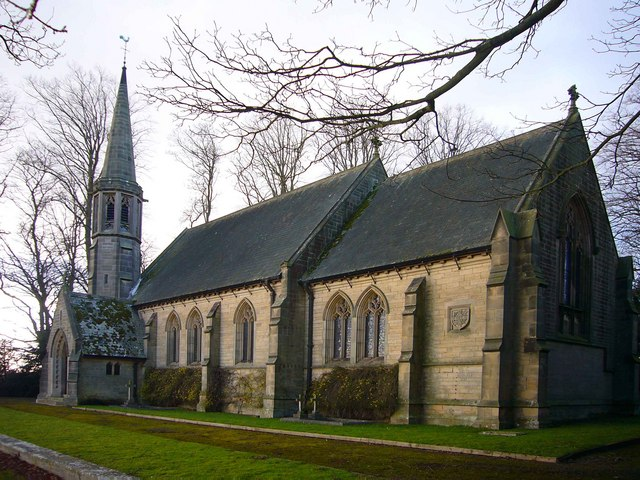
- St Aidan's Chapel

- Location within Northumberland
- Population: 519 (2011)
- OS grid reference: NY975665
- Unitary authority: Northumberland
- Ceremonial county: Northumberland
- Region: North East
- Country: England
- Sovereign state: United Kingdom
- Post town: HEXHAM
- Postcode district: NE46
- Police: Northumbria
- Fire: Northumberland
- Ambulance: North East
- UK Parliament: Hexham

Sandhoe is a hamlet and civil parish in Northumberland, England. It lies about 3 kilometres (2 mi) northwest of Corbridge and 3 kilometres south of Hadrian's Wall. The parish touches Acomb, Corbridge, Hexham and Wall.

== History ==
The name "Sandhoe" means 'Sandy hill-spur'. Sandhoe is a deserted medieval village, the village was first recorded in the 13th century but by 1769 it had completely disappeared and is now covered by modern housing. Sandhoe was formerly a township in the parish of St. John-Lee, in 1866 Sandhoe became a civil parish in its own right.

== Landmarks ==
Listed buildings in the township include Beaufront Castle and Sandhoe Hall.
