= Errington baronets of Ness (1963) =

Errington baronets
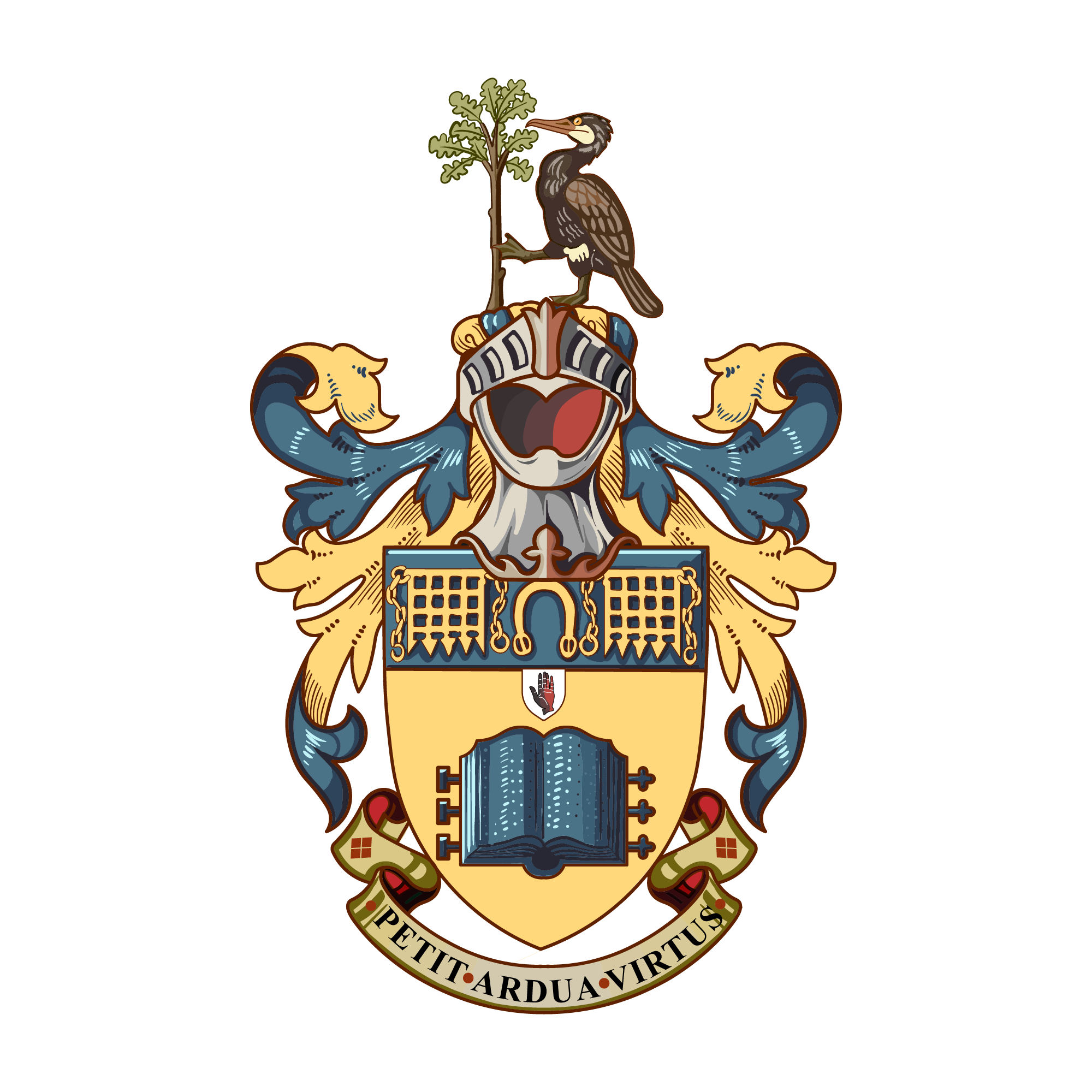
- Arms of the Errington baronets of Ness
- Creation date: 1963
- Creation: England, United Kingdom
- Created by: Elizabeth II, Queen of England
- First holder: Sir Eric Errington, 1st Baronet of Ness
- Present holder: Sir Robin Davenport Errington, 3rd Baronet of Ness
- Heir apparent: Oliver Marcus Errington
- Motto: Petit Ardua Virtus (valour seeks the arduous)
- Arms: Or an open book clasped on a chief Azure a spur rowel upwards between two portcullises chained Or
- Crest: A liver bird supporting with the dexter claw an oak sapling Proper.

The Errington baronetcy, of Ness in the County Palatine of Chester, was created in the Baronetage of the United Kingdom on 26 June 1963 for Sir Eric Errington. Errington was a barrister, Royal Air Force officer and politician who served as a Member of Parliament for Bootle from 1935 to 1945, and for Aldershot from 1954 to 1970. He was chairman of the executive committee of the National Union of Conservative and Unionist Associations and was knighted in 1952.

His eldest son, the 2nd Baronet, inherited the title in 1973. He was Colonel of The King's Regiment between 1975 and 1986. He was elected a Fellow of the Royal Society of Arts in 1994, and was appointed to the Order of the British Empire in 1998.

== Errington baronets, of Ness (1963) ==
- Sir Eric Errington, 1st Baronet of Ness (1900–1973)
- Sir Geoffrey Frederick Errington, 2nd Baronet of Ness (1926–2015)
- Sir Robin Davenport Errington, 3rd Baronet of Ness (born 1957)

The heir apparent to the baronetcy is the current holder's son, Oliver Marcus Errington (born 2001).

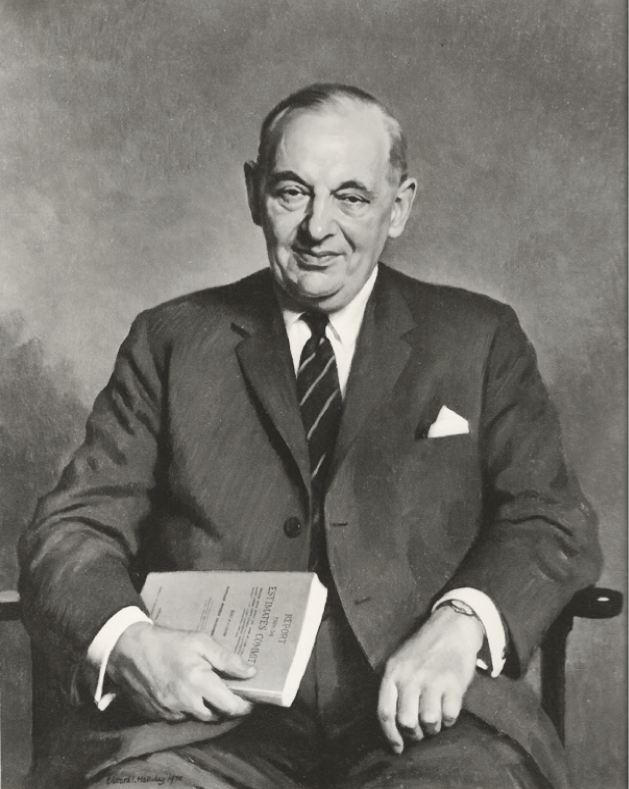
Portrait of Sir Eric Errington, Bt

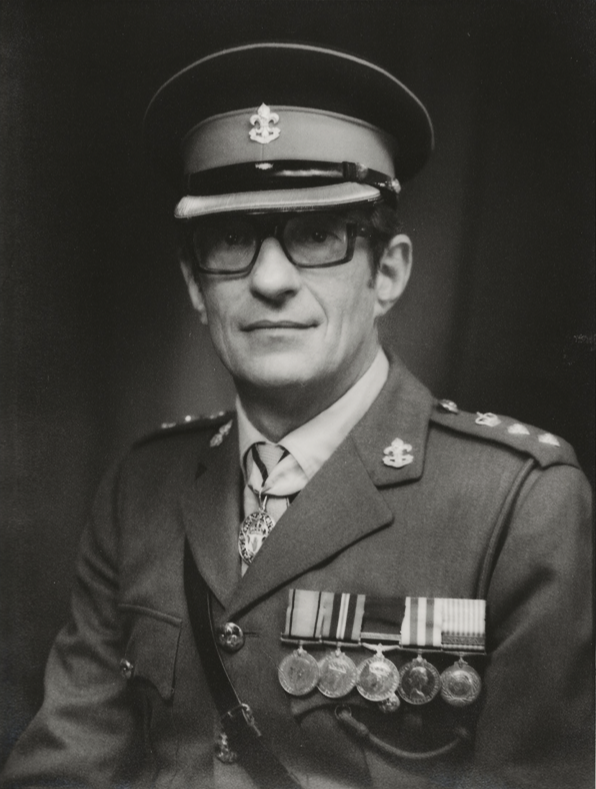
Portrait of Colonel Sir Geoffrey Frederick Errington, Bt OBE

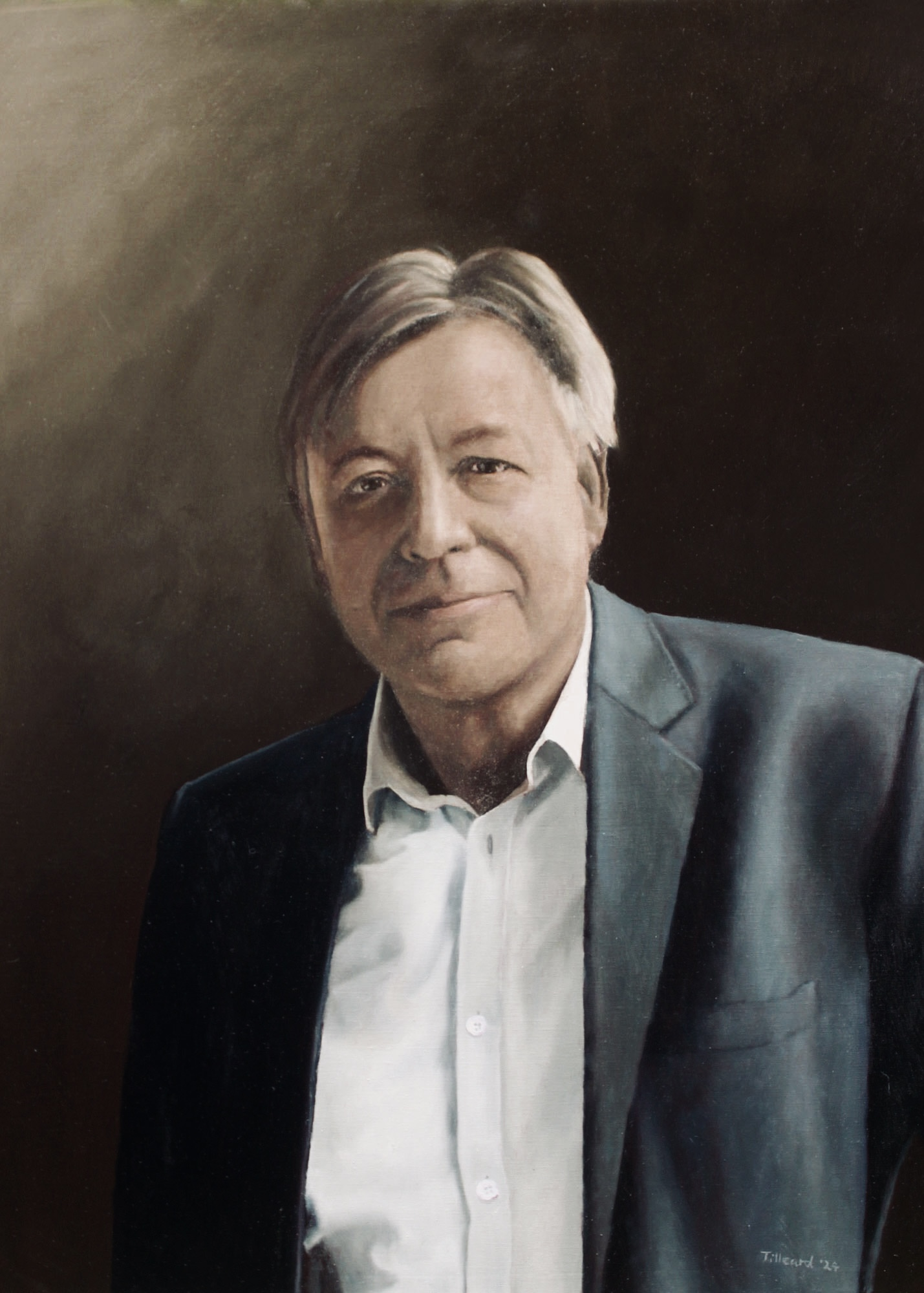
Portrait of Sir Robin Davenport Errington, Bt

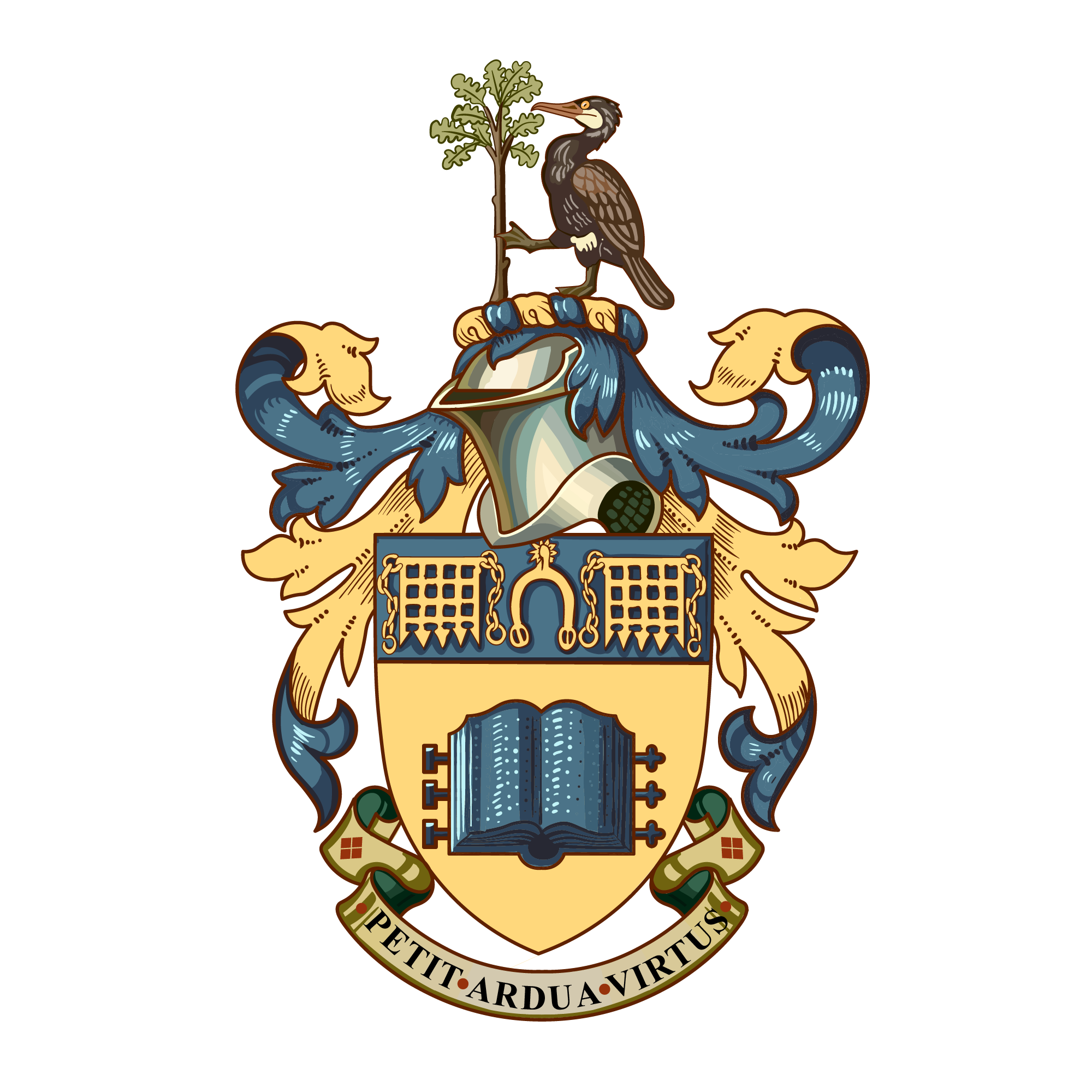
Arms of Errington, prior to the creation of the baronetcy of Ness
