= Williams-Bulkeley baronets =

Title in the Baronetage of England

The Williams, later Williams-Bulkeley Baronetcy, of Penrhyn in the County of Caernarvon, is a title in the Baronetage of England. It was created on 17 June 1661 for Griffith Williams. He had already been granted a baronetcy by Oliver Cromwell in 1658. The second Baronet represented both Caernarvonshire and Caernarvon in the House of Commons. The eighth Baronet sat as Member of Parliament for Beaumaris while the ninth Baronet represented Caernarvonshire and Beaumaris. The tenth Baronet was Member of Parliament for Beaumaris, Anglesey and Flint Boroughs and served as Lord Lieutenant of Caernarvonshire. In 1826 he assumed by Royal licence the additional surname of Bulkeley on succeeding to the estates of Thomas James Bulkeley, 7th Viscount Bulkeley. The twelfth and thirteenth Baronets were both Lord Lieutenant of Anglesey while the latter was also Lord Lieutenant of Gwynedd. The family seat is Baron Hill, Anglesey. Arms of Williams of Penrhyn: Gules, a chevron ermine between three Saxon's heads in profile couped proper.

== Williams, later Williams-Bulkeley baronets, of Penrhyn (1661) ==
- Sir Griffith Williams, 1st Baronet (died 1663)
- Sir Robert Williams, 2nd Baronet (c. 1627–1678)
- Sir John Williams, 3rd Baronet (died c. 1682)
- Sir Griffith Williams, 4th Baronet (died c. 1685)
- Sir Hugh Williams, 5th Baronet (died c. 1706)
- Sir Griffith Williams, 6th Baronet (died 1734)
- Sir Robert Williams, 7th Baronet (died 1745)
- Sir Hugh Williams, 8th Baronet (1718–1794)
- Sir Robert Williams, 9th Baronet (1764–1830)
- Sir Richard Bulkeley Williams-Bulkeley, 10th Baronet (1801–1875)
- Sir Richard Mostyn Lewis Williams-Bulkeley, 11th Baronet (1833–1884)
- Sir Richard Henry Williams-Bulkeley, 12th Baronet (1862–1942)
  - Major Richard Gerard Wellesley Williams-Bulkeley (1887–1918), killed in action in World War I
- Sir Richard Harry David Williams-Bulkeley, 13th Baronet (1911–1992)
- Sir Richard Thomas Williams-Bulkeley, 14th Baronet (1939–2026)
- Sir Richard Hugh Williams-Bulkeley, 15th Baronet (born 1968)

The heir apparent is the present baronet's elder son, Richard David Harry Williams-Bulkeley (born 1996).

== See also ==
- Viscount Bulkeley
- Williams baronets

== Source ==
- Kidd, Charles, ed. (1903). Debrett's peerage, baronetage, knightage, and companionage. London: Dean and son. p. 1110.
- Leigh Rayment's list of baronets
