= Caerau, Anglesey =

Coordinates: 53°23′44″N 4°31′41″W

Caerau
- Location within Anglesey
- OS grid reference: SH 3200 9172
  - Cardiff: 144 mi (232 km)
  - London: 226 mi (364 km)
- Community: Cylch-y-Garn
- Principal area: Anglesey
- Preserved county: Gwynedd
- Country: Wales
- Sovereign state: United Kingdom
- Post town: Holyhead
- Police: North Wales
- Fire: North Wales
- Ambulance: Welsh
- UK Parliament: Ynys Môn
- Senedd Cymru – Welsh Parliament: Ynys Môn

Caerau, Cylch-y-Garn is an area in the community of Cylch-y-Garn, Isle of Anglesey, Wales.

== Caerau Mansion ==
There is a group of buildings at Caerau which form a mansion and outbuildings, the mansion became Grade II* listed in 1970. The original house was built in the late 1600s, then an almost-separate large extension was added in 1730, in the form of another building with a wing to attach the two. A separate stable block, latrine block and gateway have their own heritage listings.

As of 2020, the mansion had been reported to have been unoccupied for many years and was in need of major reconstruction.

== See also ==
- List of localities in Wales by population
