= Nannau Hall =

Grade II* listed building in Gwynedd, Wales

Plas Nannau Hall
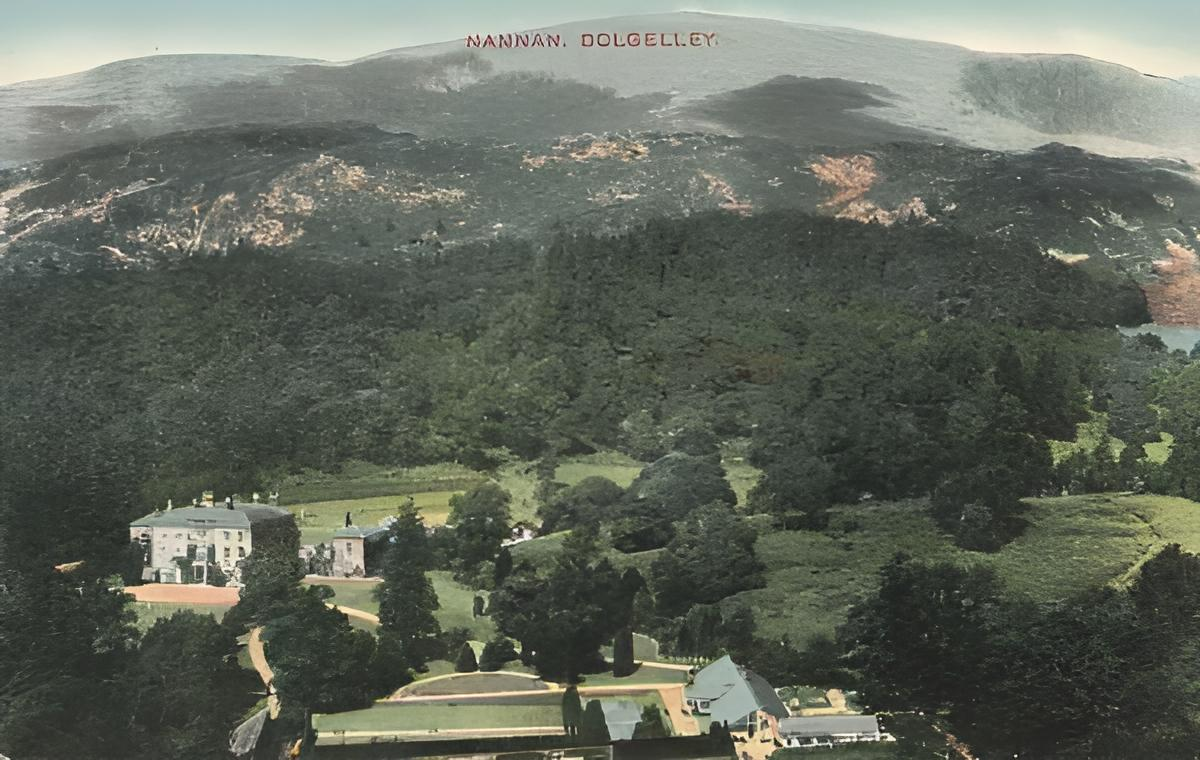
- "The highest situation of any gentleman’s house in Great Britain"

- Location within Gwynedd
- 52.7703°N 3.8645°W
- Type: House
- Location: Llanfachreth, Wales

History
- Built: 1795–1805 & 1808

Site notes
- Area: North Wales
- Architect(s): Sir Robert Vaughan, 2nd Baronet & Joseph Bromfield
- Architectural style: Neoclassical

Listed Building – Grade II*
- Official name: Nannau
- Designated: 14 June 1952
- Reference no.: 4710

Nannau (Welsh for 'the place of streams'') refers to both an ancient estate and its current Georgian mansion near the village of Llanfachreth, Gwynedd, North Wales. The mansion was initially inhabited by the Welsh family named Nanney (Nannau), and was in the possession of this one family for over 900 years. At its largest Nannau was 12,000 acres.

Nannau is a Grade II* listed building and its parkland is listed, also at Grade II*, on the Cadw/ICOMOS Register of Parks and Gardens of Special Historic Interest in Wales. The family dynasty was founded by Cadwgan of Nannau, identified with Cadwgan ap Bleddyn of the Lleision, a family associated with the Kingdom of Powys. The Lord of Nannau title continued for four centuries, until the division of the cadet branches. The estate was then passed on to an heiress, Janet, who married into the Vaughan family of Hengwrt in 1719. In 1795, their descendants, the Vaughan baronets, replaced the then 17th-century mansion with a new house co-designed by Joseph Bromfield, which still stands today.

The head of the family represented the local county as Sheriff of Merionethshire and held the position nine times in 400 years between the 16th and 20th centuries. In 1911, as recorded by Encyclopædia Britannica, the families of county rank in the neighbourhood of Dolgellau included those of Nannau, Hengwrt (the famous Hengwrt Welsh MSS), Caerynwch, Fronwnion, Bron-y-gadair, Brynygwin, Brynadda, Abergwynnant, Garthangharad.

By the mid-20th century, the estate was "wrecked", and a succession of short-term owners saw much of the land sold off, the demolition of some of the 18th-century mansion, and failed attempts to establish a hotel at the hall. By 2020, the lead from the roof had been stolen, and the house was "deteriorating rapidly". Nannau is considered in the top at risk buildings by multiple organizations, including SAVE Britains Heritage and The Georgian Group. Despite acknowledgement years ago by Snowdonia Park Authority and Cadw of the critical need for intervention no action has yet been taken and the roof continues to be uncovered.

== Nannau family history ==
Cadwgan ap Bleddyn Coat of Arms for Nannau

=== 11 – 15th centuries ===
The Nanney family of Dolgellau claimed descent from the Lleision through Cadwgan of Nannau, identified with Cadwgan ap Bleddyn, the second son of Bleddyn ap Cynfyn. Cadwgan's elder brother Maredudd ap Bleddyn had reestablished the Kingdom of Powys by his death in 1132. Cadwgan's son Madog ap Cadwgan became the 1st Lord of Nannau. The 2nd Lord was Cadwgan ap Madog, his uncle Owain was knighted by King Henry I of England in the Duchy of Normandy about 1112, but died in 1116. (Note: However, the genealogies in surviving medieval sources record too few generations between Cadwgan and his supposed children, and so Peter Bartrum argued that the identification of Cadwgan of Nannau with Cadwgan ap Bleddyn is incorrect.) The title of Lord was passed on from father to son until the early 16th century. Following the creation of the title Lord of Nannau, a prominent member of the family who became the 5th Lord was known as Ynyr Hen ("old Ynyr"). His son Ynyr Fychan ("Little Ynyr") sided with the English crown during the Conquest of Wales by Edward I and was rewarded for the capture of Madog ap Llywelyn (1295) during the revolt against the new administration. King Edward I also rewarded those who pledged allegiance by allowing them to keep their land. This marked the beginning of the Nannau estate dynasty. The effigy of the 7th Lord, Meurig ap Ynyr Fychan (c. 14th century) is on display at St. Mary's Church, Dolgellau. Another son of Ynyr Fychan, Einion, later became the Bishop of St. Asaph.

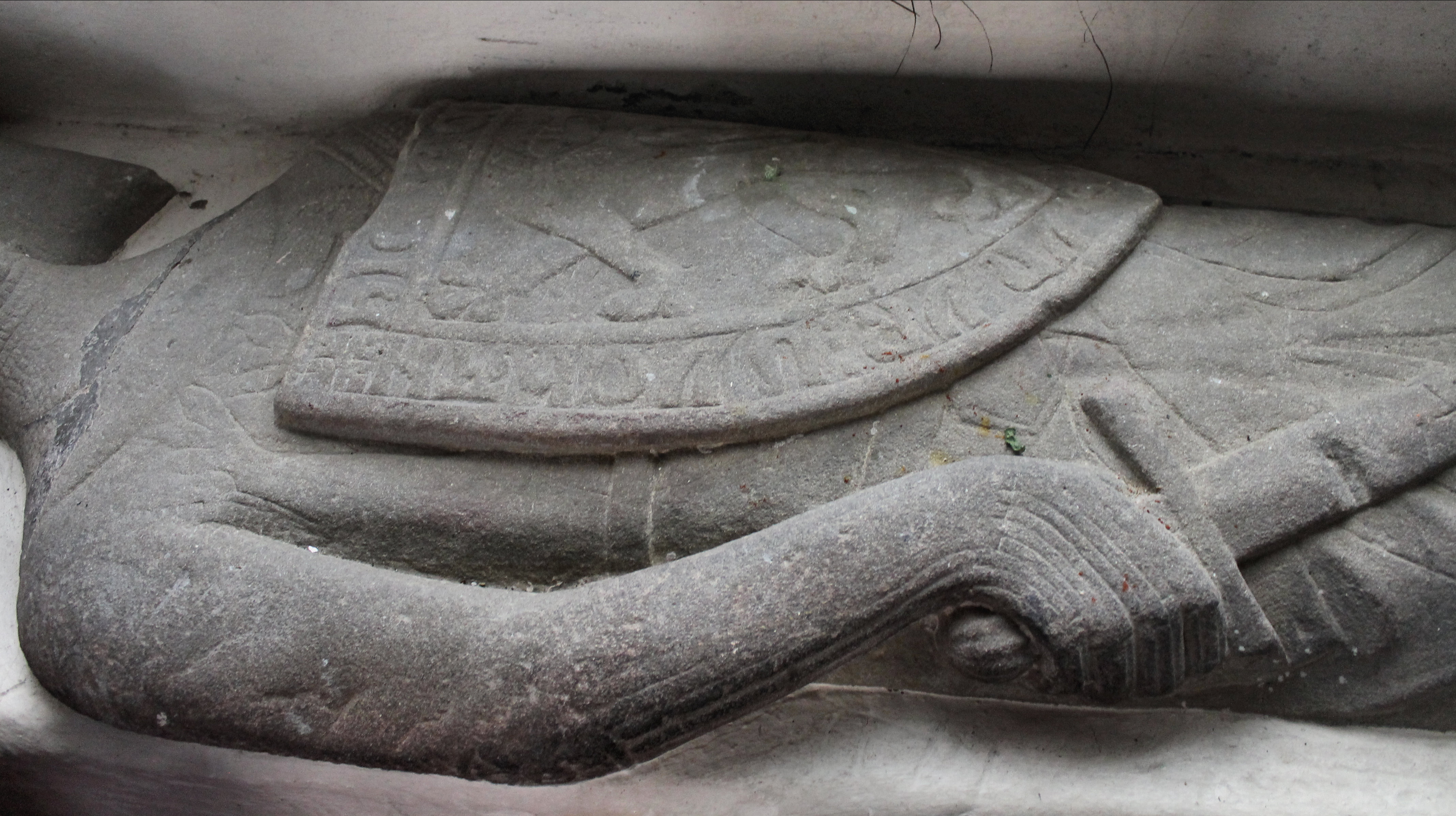
Meurig ap Ynyr Fychan effigy, St. Marys church, Dolgellau

The Lordship of Nannau was passed on to Hywel Sele (9th Lord of Nannau, d. 1402), probably the most famous Nannau owner, who was noted for his attempted assassination of Owain Glyndŵr on the Nannau estate, before Owain set the Nannau house ablaze. (Note: Tradition suggests that having invited him to a hunting party to effect a reconciliation, Sele attempted to shoot Glyndŵr but was himself killed and had his body hidden in an oak tree on the estate.) Following this incident, the house was rebuilt. This would be one of at least five reconstructions during the Nannau family's tenure of the estate.

=== 15 – 20th centuries ===
The Nannau family established a new dynasty through marriage which connected it to Tal-y-bont, Dyffryn Ardudwy, and enabled it to extend its reach throughout Wales and beyond. Lands were bought in the areas of Brithdir, Dyffryndan, and Cefnyrywen, and Dolgleder, Garthgynfor and Garthmaelan in the surrounding areas. The family established many cadet branches, beginning with Sele's brother. At the end of the 16th century, the families of Caerynwch and Cefndeuddwr emerged, and later on the family of Maes-y-Pandy. There was also an alliance with the Dolau-gwyn family.

Between 1400 and 1600, the Nannau farmlands were vastly expanded, and successive Nannau lords held government posts in and around Dolgellau. A cousin of the 10th Lord sided with the House of Tudor during the Wars of the Roses (1455–1487) and was the commander of Harlech Castle during its siege. He also fought in the Hundred Years' War in the Kingdom of France. The family helped establish Cymer Abbey, Llanelltyd, Dolgellau, and other churches in North Wales that still stand today. An heiress of the Nannau Estate was Alice, who married a descendant of Hywel Coetmor in the 15th century. She was the sole heiress of Hywel ap Meurig of Nannau. The Lord of Nannau title endured until the 13th Lord, who was the last to hold the royal title after 400 years of father/son inheritance. This period marked the beginning of surnames in Wales, and the Nanney family name emerged in the early 16th century. This coincided with a new era of Welsh Hall Houses: the Snowdonia type, in particular.

For centuries, the Nanney family controlled the estate and the surrounding region. Together with the Vaughan family who claimed descent from Rhodri Fawr (c. 9th century), King of Wales, these two families established a dynasty around the town of Dolgellau, as well as Merionethshire and other parts of Caernarfonshire. The 17th century brought a new era for the Nannau family. Huw Nanney Hen's (1542–1623) mother was a descendant of Henry IV of England and the House of Lancaster, he was a Sheriff of Merionethshire in 1587. Nanney Hen built a new residence at Nannau c. 1615, but it lasted only a generation before being burnt to the ground around 1645 during the English Civil War. The family had to move to their more traditional second home, Dolrhyd, near the town of Dolgellau, an adjacent estate since the 16th century (now a residential care home).

It was only in 1697 that a permanent residence was established at Nannau. Nannau remained a family home until the eventual sale of the mansion in 1965. The need to move around due to civil strife was evident when Vaughan, 2nd Baronet, inherited the title in 1792. He also acquired six estates: Nannau, Dolrhyd (Doluwcheogrhyd), Rhug, Hengwrt, Meillionydd, and Ystum Colwyn. It was Vaughan who personally designed Nannau's Georgian mansion and the cottages and lodges which are still in use today.

=== Family poets ===
The Nannau family had been patrons of several famous Welsh poets of the period, and the mansion is mentioned in several poems from the 14th century onwards. Examples were, Llywelyn Goch ap Meurig Hen (c. 1350–1390), he was a famous poet and cousin to an owner of Nannau. He wrote the famous poem Lament for Lleucu Llwyd. Another Nannau family bard, Sion Dafydd Lâs (d. 1694), was considered to be one of the last of the traditional live-in family poets in Wales.

=== Cadet branches ===
The Lord of Nannau title was passed on directly through the male line of families for centuries until the direct line ceased in the 16th century with the 12th Lord, Howel Nanney (1470–1580) who was esquire to Henry VIII. From Howel, the first cadet branch was established by the Nanneys of Cefndeuddwr who later became the Ellis-Nanney baronets of Gwynfryn and Cefndeuddwr (c. 1900). The other cadet branches descended from Huw Nanney Hen who would have become the 14th Lord if the title had continued, followed by his fifth son, Edward Nanney (b. 1578), from whom four more houses were descended as estates in Gwynedd: the Nanneys of Maes-Y-Pandy, Llanfihangel-y-Pennant; the Nanneys of Llanfendigaid, Tywyn; the Nanney-Wynns of Maes-y-neuadd, Llandecwyn, Talsarnau, and the Nanneys of Llwyn, Dolgellau.

The establishment of the family's cadet branches marked the end of the Nannau family's direct male heir ownership. After almost 600 years, the male line ended with the tenure of Colonel Huw Nanney IV when he married Catherine Vaughan from Corsygedol & Talhenbont Hall. They had four daughters. He died in 1701. Then began the transition of Nannau to the Vaughan family and eventually the Vaughan baronets. Huw Nanney IV built a new mansion between 1693 and 1697. The home was sketched by artist Moses Griffith around 1797. Vaughan oversaw the design of another reconstruction of the Nannau mansion which still stands today.

=== Royal visits ===
The son of John Vaughan (1830–1900) welcomed dignitaries on the occasion of Queen Victoria's fourth tour of Wales. He also welcomed royal couple Princess Beatrice of the United Kingdom and her husband Prince Henry of Battenberg when Princess Beatrice laid the foundation stone of St John's Church, Barmouth on 27 August 1889. In April 1949 John's son Major-General John Vaughan who inherited Nannau, received another royal couple to the area of the new Nannau estate: Elizabeth II and Prince Philip, Duke of Edinburgh, with their newborn son Charles, now King of England. The royal couple stayed at 'Glyn' with Baron Harlech and visited Nannau for lunch on 29 April 1949.

== Nannau estate ==
=== The Nannau bucket hoard ===
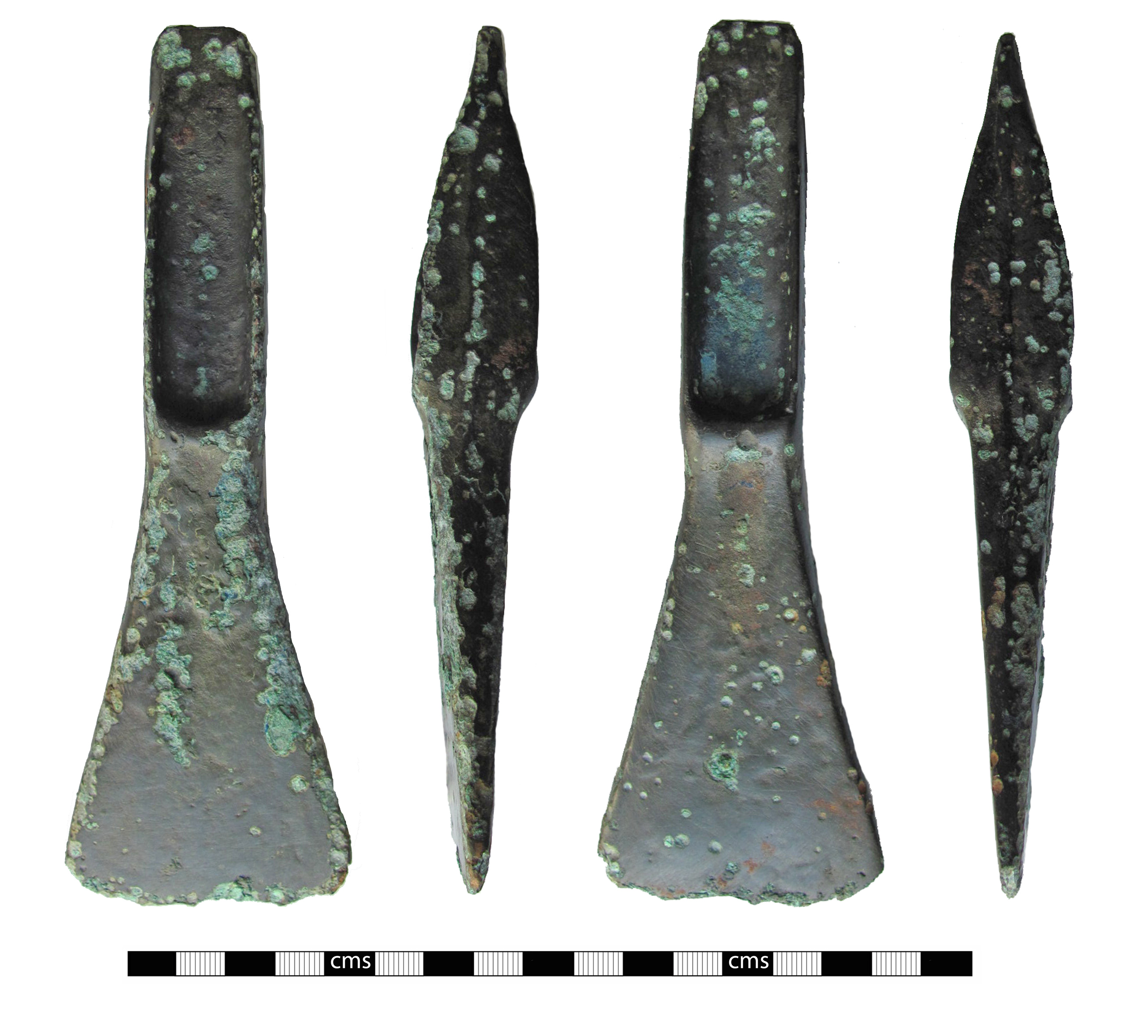
Palstave from the Middle Bronze Age Acton Park II period c. 1500–1400 BC, part of an example of the Arthog hoard

It is believed that Vaughan, 2nd Baronet, had shown great interest in antiquities and had brought a bucket covered in inches of peat bog from nearby Arthog, near the Mawddach estuary, in 1826. The bucket turned out to be an urn from the Bronze Age, possibly from East-Central Europe. An identical urn was found in Hungary. The bucket was left unattended for 60 years near the Hywel Sele lodge before it was discovered by John Vaughan's girls in 1881. It was used as a cigar ashtray and a waste paper bin until 1951 when Major-General Vaughan revealed the urn to guests. The urn was later dated by Professor Christopher Hawkes as about 2,700 years old and sent to the British Museum the following year. Another similar discovery named the Dowris Hoard was found in the 1820s in Dowris, County Offaly, Ireland. A late Bronze Age cauldron was discovered with a hoard of weapons; the discovery was from the same period as the Nannau bucket at Arthog. Some of the items buried in the Snowdonia bog were later found to be from 1,100 BC.

=== Nannau Deer Park ===
Nannau's medieval deer park is surrounded by fencing and is near the site of one of Nannau's much older houses. The deer park was heavily landscaped in the late 18th and early 18th centuries. The forest in the deer park used to be much larger. The deer park is also home the site of the mythological haunted oak, ruins of lookout towers, ancient oak trees, late-medieval rabbit pillow mounds, two gatehouses (Hywel Sele and Lower Lodges), and a Tudor stone arch. The deer escaped during a snow storm in 1963, but can still be seen in the area. There are the remains of two fish ponds in the deer park.

==== Stone Towers ====
There are two ruinous folly towers near Hywel Sele Lodge, thought to have been used as lookout towers to alert the estate when the guests were returning. It is possible another folly nearby, the Nannau 'Summer House', located just outside the deer park, was also used as a lookout point in conjunction with the towers.

==== Rabbit Mounds ====
There are the remains of four medieval pillow mounds for rabbit breeding on the hill directly past Hywel Sele Lodge, on the left. The rabbits were originally cared for by monks of the nearby Cymer Abbey.

=== Iron age hillforts ===
Nannau is home to at least three Iron Age Celtic hillforts. There are two hillforts on Moel Offrwm, a smaller hillfort on the side and a larger one at the summit. Another is the hillfort on Foel Faner, overlooking Llyn Cynwch.

=== Nannau Park walks ===
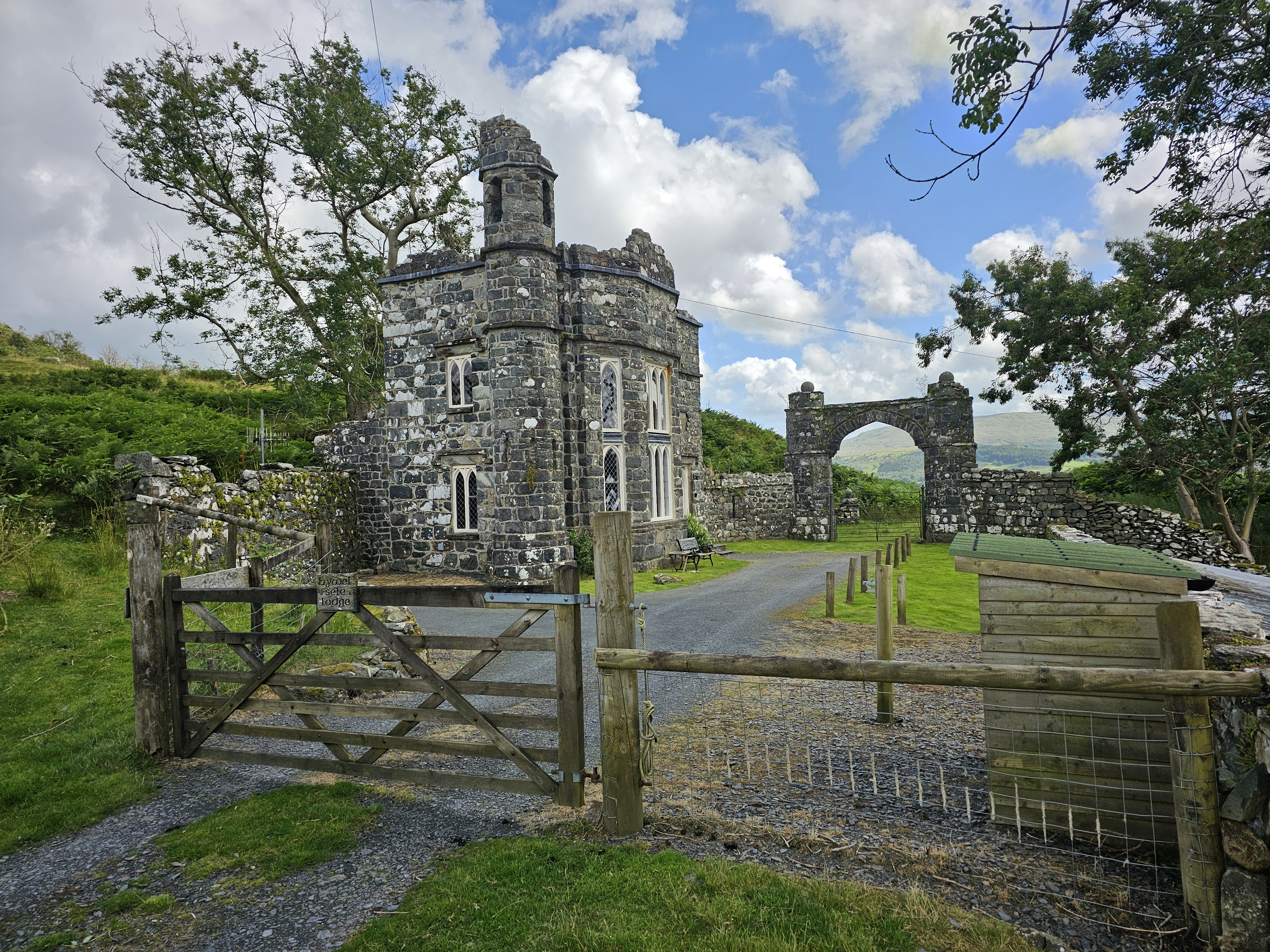
Hywel Sele Lodge and Arch

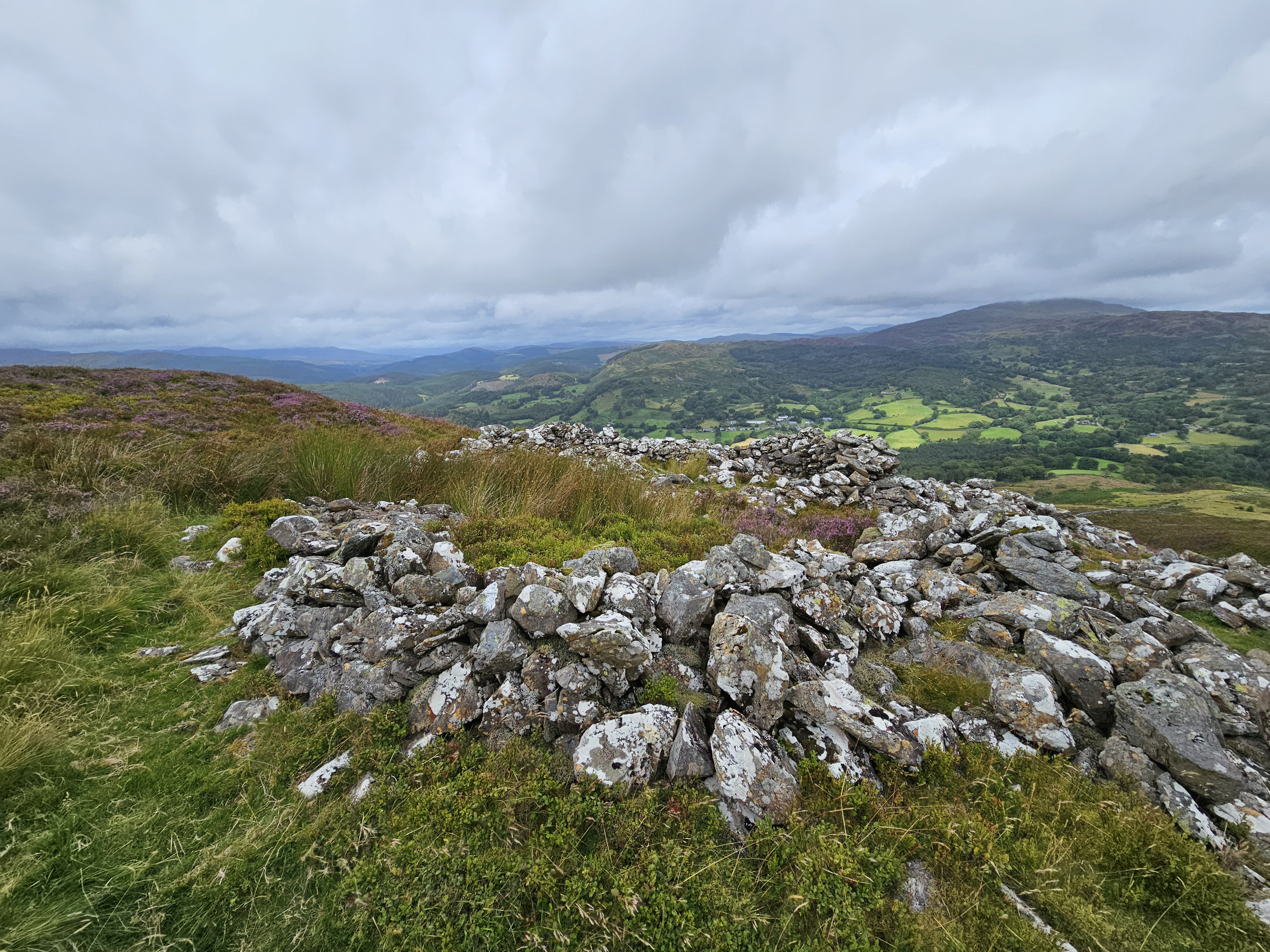
Ruins of Foel Offrwm Hillfort

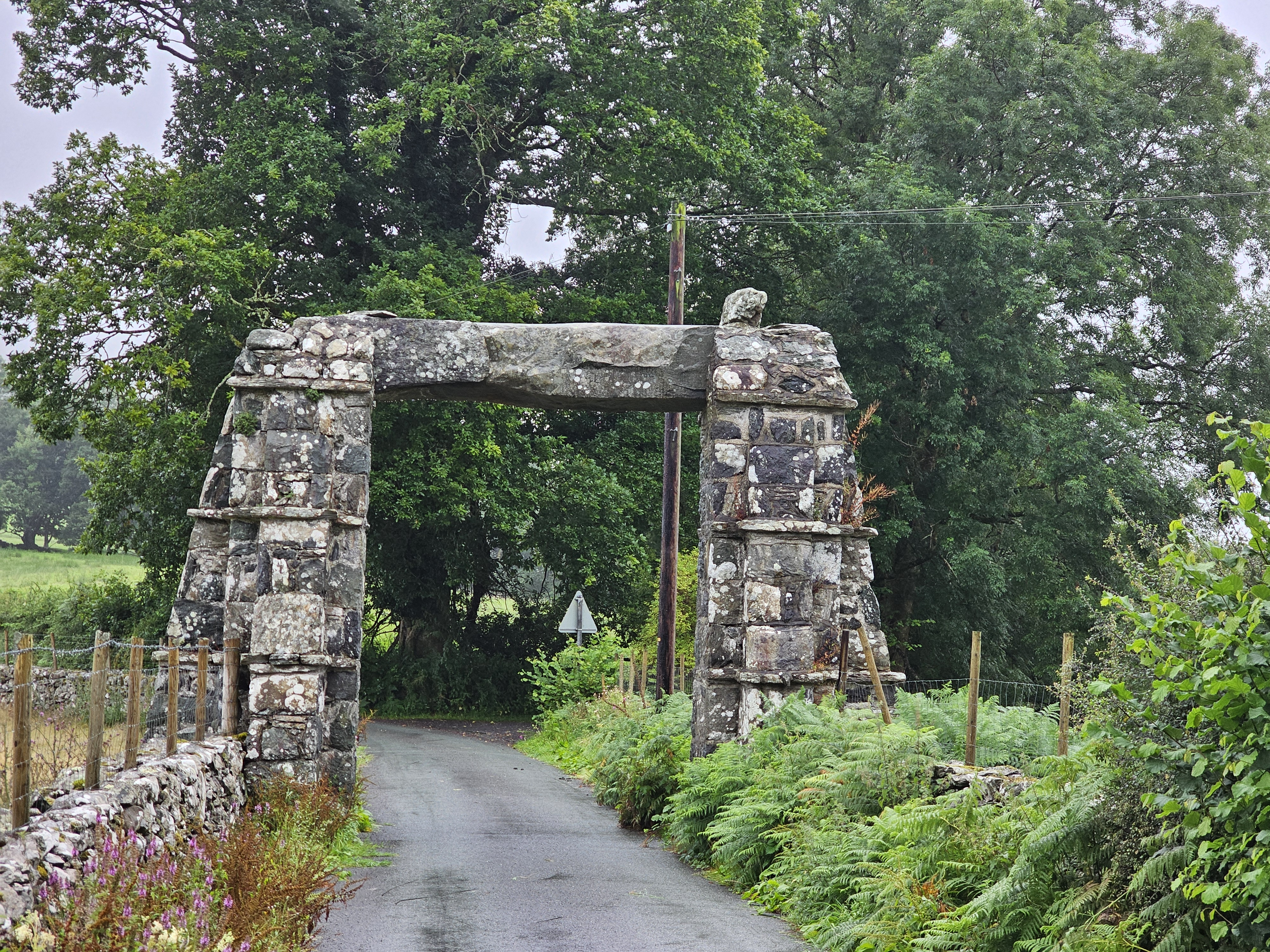
Y Garreg Fawr "The Great Stone"

- Precipice Walk
- Summit Walk of Foel Offrwm
- Foel Offrwm Walk
- Nannau Deer Park Walk
- Pandy Bach Walk

=== Gatehouse and stone arches ===
Nannau has at least three gatehouses and four stone arches, with overlap.

==== Hywel Sele Lodge ====
Hywel Sele Lodge is a two-storey semi-ruinous Tudor-Gothic style mini-castle folly that was the North gatehouse to the estates deer park. There is a Tudor arch attached to the lodge via a stone wall.

==== Lower Lodge ====
Lower Lodge was the South deer park gatehouse. The two-storey stone lodge is notable for its slate siding. It has an iron gate with stone piers.

==== Coed y Moch Lodge ====
Coed y Moch Lodge was gatehouse to the main entrance to Nannau from the South. It had iron gates with the Pegasus Badge emblem of the Airborne Forces and was made for Brigadier Charles Hilary Pritchard Vaughan by his old regiment of Parachute Brigade Engineers. The gate has been removed since the 1970s.

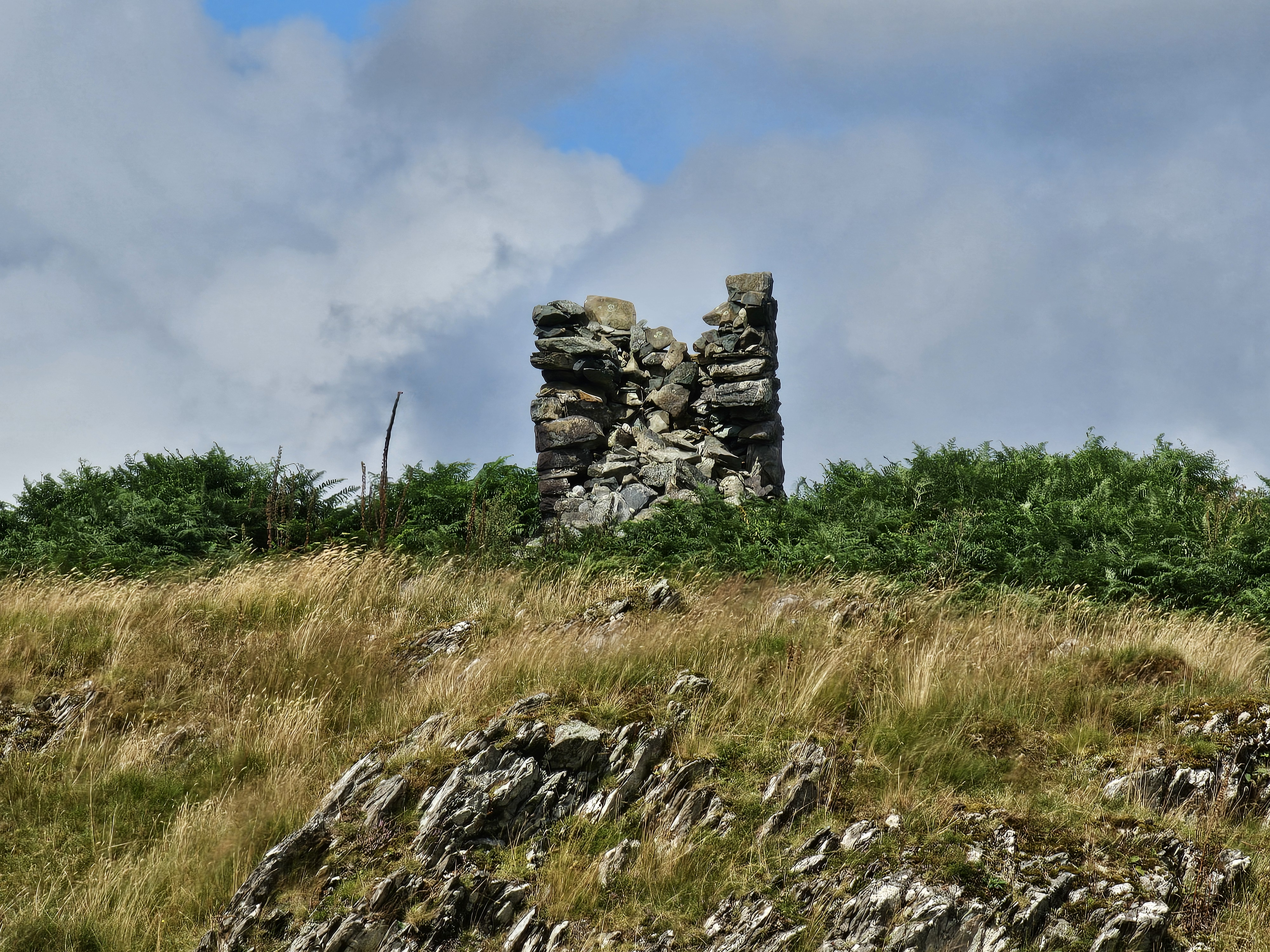
Ruins of a watch tower in the ancient Nannau Deer Park

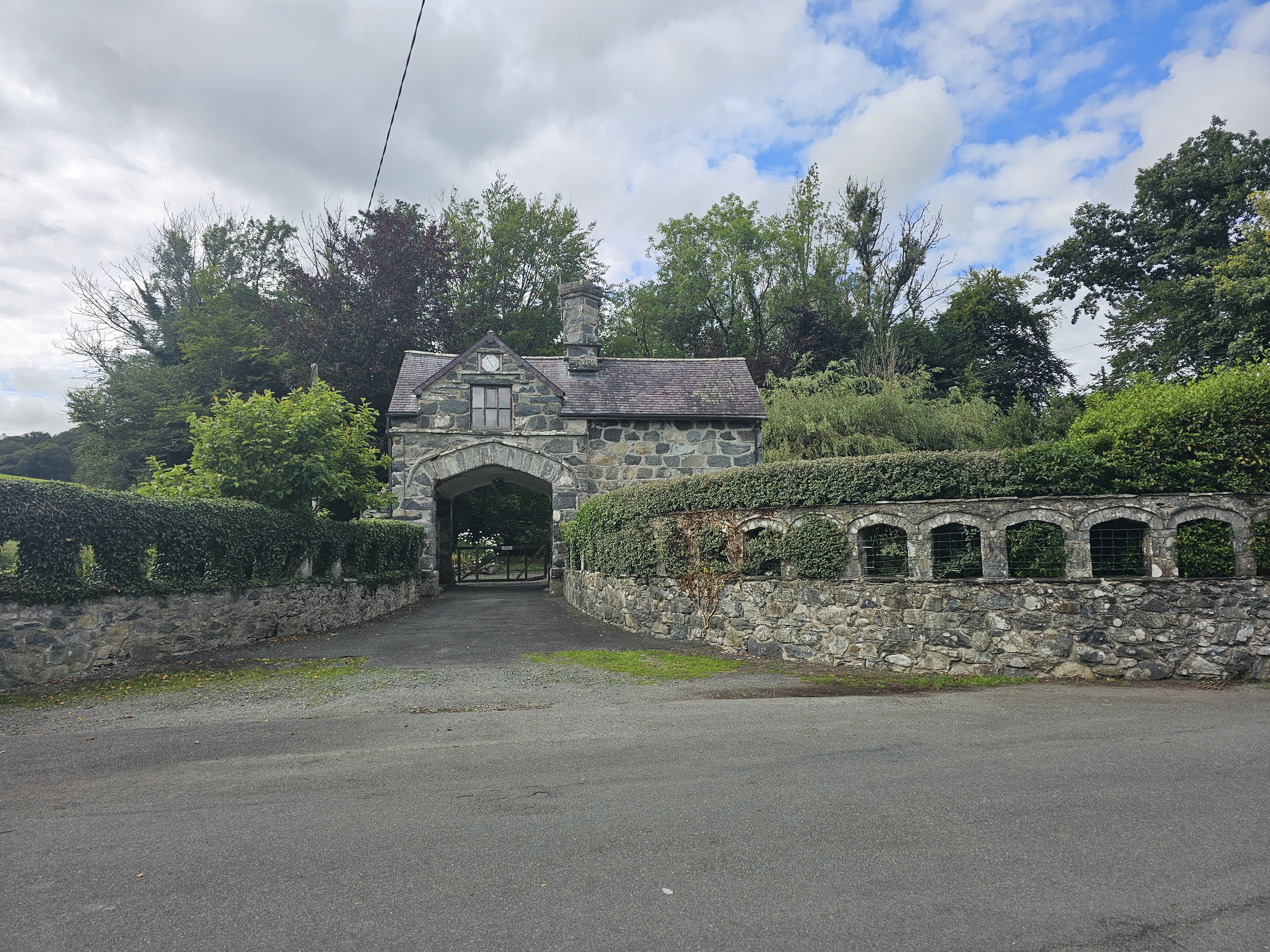
Coed Y Moch Lodge.

==== Y Garreg Fawr ====
Y Garreg Fawr ("The Great Stone") is a stone arch that marked the driveway to Nannau from Lllanfachreth. The top stone weighs 18-tons and was reportedly transported from the Roman Steps by four tenants of Sir Robert Vaughan who were late with their rent.

==== Arch at Yr Hen Ardd ====
This stone arch from 1828 marks a secondary driveway of Nannau in the deer park, near Yr Hen Ardd ("The Old Garden").

==== Arch at Maes-y-Bryner ====
The Tudor stone arch at Maes-y-Bryner was built by Sir Robert Williames Vaughan of Nannau and commemorates the 1820 coronation of King George IV. It was Grade II Listed in 1995. It is on a road leading to Maes-y-Bryner Isaf, a farmhouse house of Nannau.

== Current house ==
=== Architecture and description ===
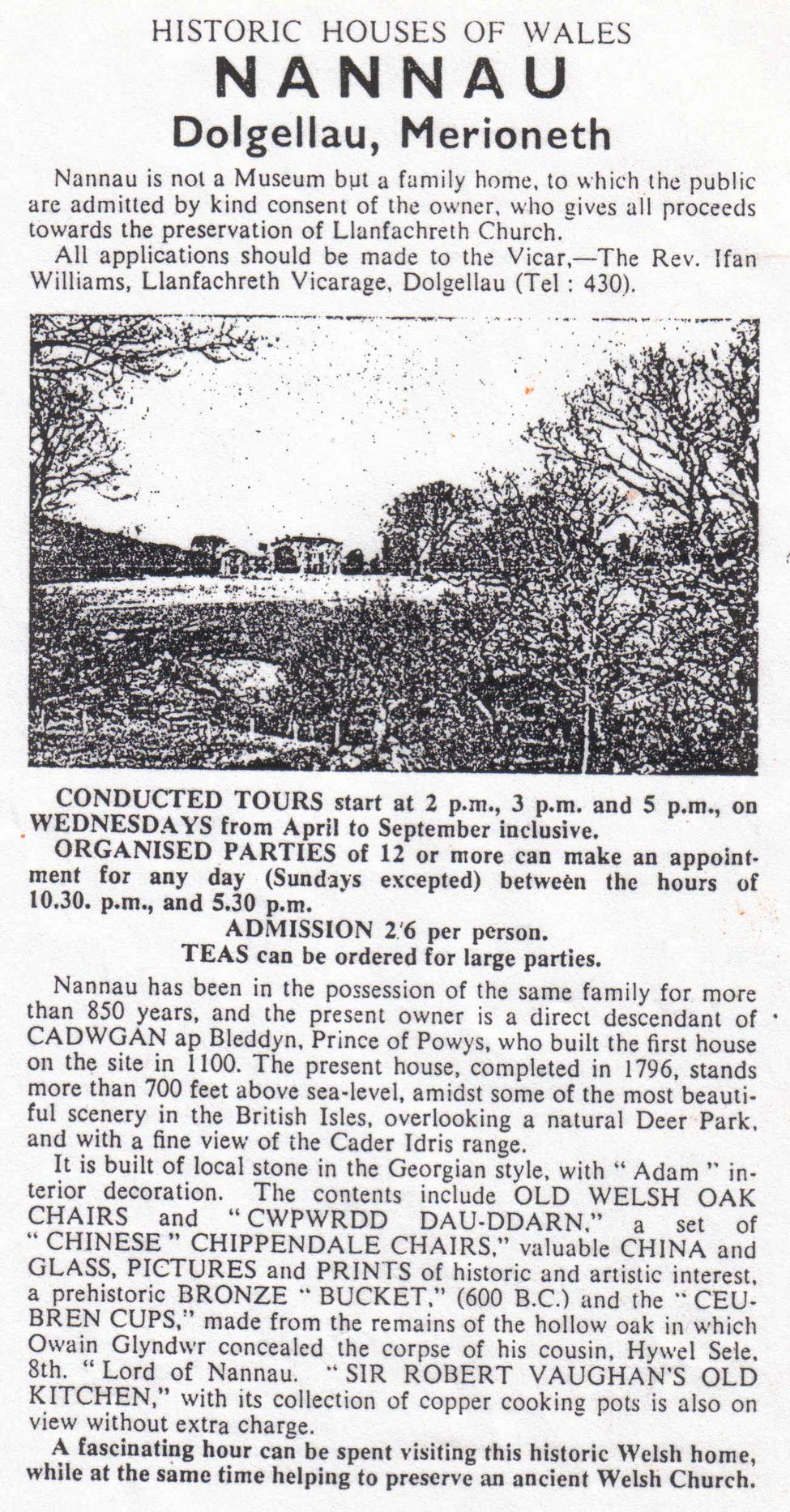
Nannau estate, Wales, advertising, estate in the same family for 850 years

A Grade II* listed structure, the authors of the Gwynedd Pevsner, call the site "extraordinary" at 700 ft above sea level. In 1784 Thomas Pennant described Nannau as "perhaps the highest situation of any gentleman’s house in Great Britain". The neoclassical house was built between about 1788 and 1805. The Georgian building was the idea of Robert Hywel Vaughan, 1st Baronet (1723–1792) and his son Robert Willames Vaughan (1768–1843) who, by 1795, completed the design process by adapting designs from a book by the architect P. F. Robinson and adding his own subtle variations and Tudor elements. The architect Joseph Bromfield was engaged by the Vaughans to help design the flanking pavilions constructed c.1805. Pevsner suggests that the whole building is likely to be attributable to him, but Cadw is less certain. The Nannau records imply that Bromfield was responsible for the wings and most of the internal decorations. However a fire in 1808 destroyed part of the building, only for Bromfield to design the rebuilding of stairs and banisters in coordination with the 2nd Baronet.

The following quotation is from Nannau – A Rich Tapestry of Welsh History by Philip Nanney Williams on the construction of the mansion: "it was left to the 2nd Baronet to complete the design process, which he accomplished in 1795 ... In 1805 Sir Robert, 2nd Baronet, added the perfectly proportioned pavilion wings ... Sir Robert had shrewdly employed the Shrewsbury architect Joseph Bromfield to design and oversee the 1805 project. He was responsible for the wings and many of the internal decorative features."

It was during this golden age of Nannau that not only the home was rebuilt, but also the vicinity of Nannau expanded between 1805 and 1830, 55 miles of walling around Llanfachreth surrounded the 10,164-acre estate, and carriage driveways, arches, home farms, fishpond, a deer park, and afterward lodges to complete the Georgian estate.

The house is of three storeys and five bays, built in slate to a square plan and with a hipped roof. The entrance front has a porch with Ionic columns and a moulded entablature above. The house is a Grade II* listed building. The park, now separated from the house, is listed at Grade II* on the Cadw/ICOMOS Register of Parks and Gardens of Special Historic Interest in Wales.

The Nannau estate merged with the Vaughan family of Hengwrt at the beginning of the 18th century. Janet, mother of 1st Baronet Vaughan and granddaughter of Huw Nanney III married Robert Vaughan of Hengwrt in 1719. He was the great-grandson of the antiquarian Robert Vaughan. After the disastrous tenure of Hugh Vaughan (the 1st Baronet's brother) who "made a total shipwreck of his fortunes by his ill-regulated life and his utter incapacity for estate management", the family established themselves as members of parliament, obtained a baronetcy, made considerable improvements to the estate, and built a new house, the current mansion completed in 1808 with surrounding estate and parks completed in 1830. (Note: Sir Robert Willames Vaughan, 2nd Baronet, was famed for his generous hospitality and prodigious appetite. The cleric and wit Sydney Smith wrote that" "He sees from his windows Cadair Idris and Snowdon, both of them inferior to himself in height and bulk.") (Note: To celebrate the coming of age of his son in 1824, Vaughan slaughtered and roasted the White Ox of Nannau, the last of an ancient herd of such oxen bred on the estate.) The reigns of Robert Hywel Vaughan and of his son, Sir Robert Vaughan, 2nd Baronet in the late 18th and 19th centuries were considered the "golden age of Nannau". On the death of the childless 3rd baronet in 1859, the estate was inherited by Thomas Pryce Lloyd, a cousin from Pengwern, Flintshire. Lloyd became a life tenant on the condition that the estate was precluded from selling land or property. The Nannau property once again changed hands in 1874 to a distant relation, John Vaughan (d. 1900), of Chilton Grove, Shropshire. Vaughan had owned the Rhug estate and was well known to the Nannau baronets, in particular the 2nd baronet, with whom he shared a common ancestor, the antiquarian Robert Vaughan.

=== 20th century onwards ===
The estate was sold in the mid-20th century and subsequently had a succession of short-term owners. During this period, most of the land and some of the estate buildings were sold off, as well as the fishing rights, which were given to the Hengwrt estate. In 1935, Hilary Vaughan Pritchard, son of a 3rd cousin of 2nd generation Nannau owner Major-General John Vaughan, married Mary, the daughter of Charles Stanley Monck. John Vaughan and Vaughan Pritchard were both descendants of Robert Vaughan, the antiquarian from Hengwrt, b.1592.

Vaughan Pritchard had acquired ownership of the Nannau estate after the Major's death in 1956. Nannau Hall was the venue for another lavish wedding when Vaughan Pritchard's daughter Susan married David Muirhead on 14 December 1957. In 1958 a schedule of contents was made of all the possessions in the Hall. The estate's running costs would have been high. Repairs alone would have cost £8,000 (equivalent to £200,000 in 2025).

Following centuries of the Vaughan family ownership of the Nannau Hall, it was put up for sale with 10 acres (4 hectares) of land and sold for just £8,000 in 1965 to Mr Edward Morrison who was in the Royal Air Force. The remainder of the surrounding Nannau estate and Dolrhyd (also owned by Vaughan), a total of 3,578 acres (about 1400 hectares), was sold in 1975 to Vaughan Gaskell from Warrington. From 1965, an American, Edward Alexander Morrison III attempted to operate the house as a hotel with his wife, but were unsuccessful, they lived there until 1979. In 1991 the mansion was bought by a former policeman from Dolgellau, Dafydd Maslen Jones, he attempted to open a bed and breakfast but did not have enough funding to meet the planning authority. In 1995 the estate was sold to Huw Eaves from London, England. The estate was again sold to the current owner, Jason Cawood, who bought the Nannau mansion for £240,000 in 2001. The home was just a shell and hasn't been renovated since; there have also been issues such as break-ins and thefts.

=== Current state ===
The 18th-century flanking pavilions were demolished, and the building's fabric deteriorated. As of 2017, the renovation cost was believed to be around £500,000. By 2019, the theft of lead from the roof saw the house "deteriorating rapidly". In 2021, Cadw estimated the new temporary roof renovation at a cost of £100,000.

By 2021, efforts to address the condition of the building were being undertaken by the Snowdonia National Park Authority, they were supported by the Society for the Protection of Ancient Buildings. As of 2025, the home and most of the estate including lodges and forests were put up for sale for £15,000,000 for 2,837 acres (3/4 of estate), with the rest of the estate available to purchase in March 2027.

== Myths and legends ==
=== Gwiber Coed Y Moch ===
The area around Nannau's original pig grazing forest and its front gate, Coed Y Moch is said to have been home to a large serpent that was venomous and could enchant you with its gaze. The serpent was said to have been slain by a shepherd by the shores of Llyn Cynwch.

=== Haunted Oak of Nannau (Ceubren Yr Ellyll) ===
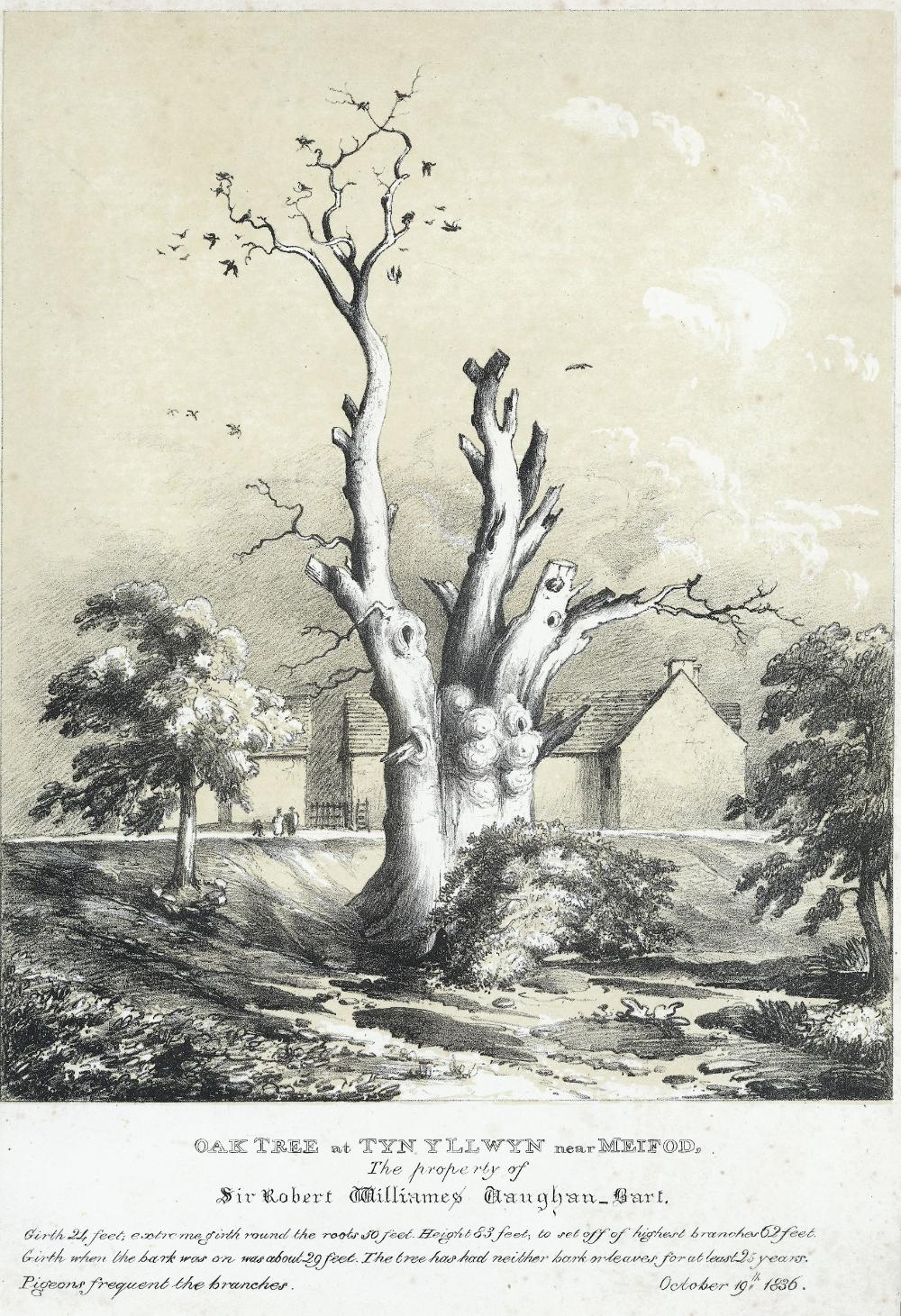
Nannau Oak tree.

The famous Nannau oak trees have grown in the estate's gardens since time immemorial, and have a lifespan of some 300–400 years. The most famous oak on the Nannau estate was aptly named Derwen Ceubren yr Ellyll (Welsh: ' the hollow oak of the demon'), this enormous oak tree had a circumference of 27 feet 6 inches (8.4 metres). The tree was felled by lightning on 27 July 1813; that day it was painted by Sir Richard Hoare, 2nd Baronet. The tree was also the deathbed of Hywel Sele, who was placed there by his cousin Glyndŵr and left unattended for 40 years before being found. The tree was made even more famous by Walter Scott and his 1808 work Marmion; "the spirit's Blasted Tree".

Thomas Pennant, in the book Tours of Wales, visits Nannau in 1784 for his third volume. He describes the Oak as:

How often has not warm fancy seen the fairy tribe revel round its trunk! Or may not the visionary eye have seen the Hamadryad burst from the bark of its coeval tree?

For some coming-of-age festivities in 1824, some of the oak was used to make a commemorative set, including a now-famous stirrup cup. This oak set, named "The Ceubren Cups", was auctioned in 2008 after being listed as contents of Nannau since 1958, as well as a silver mounted oak cup with the Vaughan Welsh language motto inscribed, ASGRE LÂN, DIOGEL EI PHERCHEN (English: A pure breast [is] a safeguard to its possessor).

The 2022 children's book Cadi & the Cursed Oak by Kara Gebhart Uhl features the story of the haunted oak.

=== Fairies of Llyn Cynwch ===
Llyn Cynwch, the largest lake of Nannau, is said to have been home to the King of fairies, with a marble palace at the bottom. The legend states a man fell into Llyn Cynwch and was transported to a beautiful palace, where the king of the fairies escorted him to an exit that ends at the hearthstone of Dol-y-clochydd, a farmhouse of Nannau.

=== Siwsi Dôl y Clochydd ===
Siwsi Dôl y Clochydd was a legendary witch who lived at Dôl-y-Clochyd of Nannau. In the story, one of Siwsi's cats is killed by the dogs of a Lord of Nannau. Siwsi gets revenge by turning into an animal, a doe or a hare, and luring the dogs to leap over a ravine, causing the dogs to leaps to their deaths. A 2003 book titled Gwrach y Gwyllt by Bethan Gwanas is based on this legend.

=== Moel Offrwm (Hill of Sacrifice) ===
The mountain at which Nannau Hall currently sits at the base of, Moel Offrwm, is known as the 'Hill of Sacrifice' due to legends of human sacrifice by druids. The mountain was also said to be home to a giant called Ophrom Gawr in ancient times. It is home to two ancient Iron Age hillforts, one at the summit and another further down the hill.

== In popular culture ==
- Cuebren Yr Ellyll, the haunted oak of Nannau, was featured in the Children's book Cadi & the Cursed Oak by Kara Gebhart Uhl in 2022.
- A 2003 book titled Gwrach y Gwyllt by Bethan Gwanas is based on the legend of Siwsw Dôl-y-Clochyd.
- The story and art of Gwiber Coed Y Moch was featured on a Churchman's cigarette card as part of the Legends of Britain series in 1936. This version depicts the beast as a wyvern, rather than a serpent.

== Gallery ==
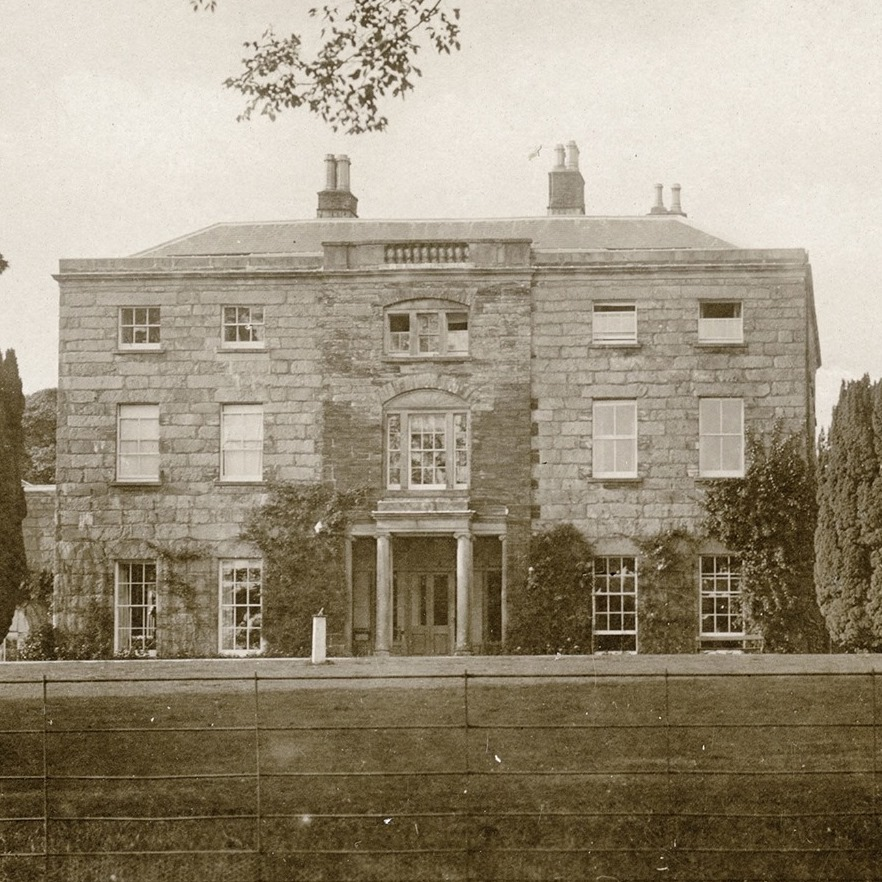
Nannau estate frontage

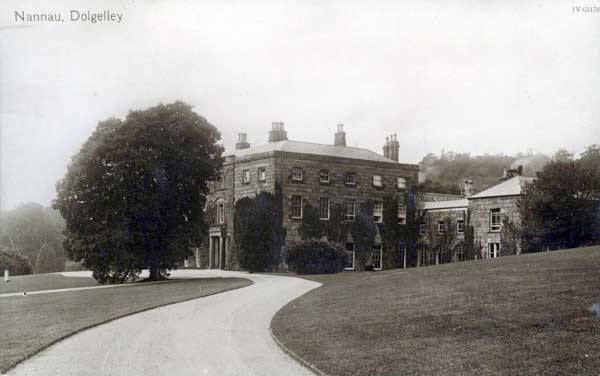
The road toward the main house

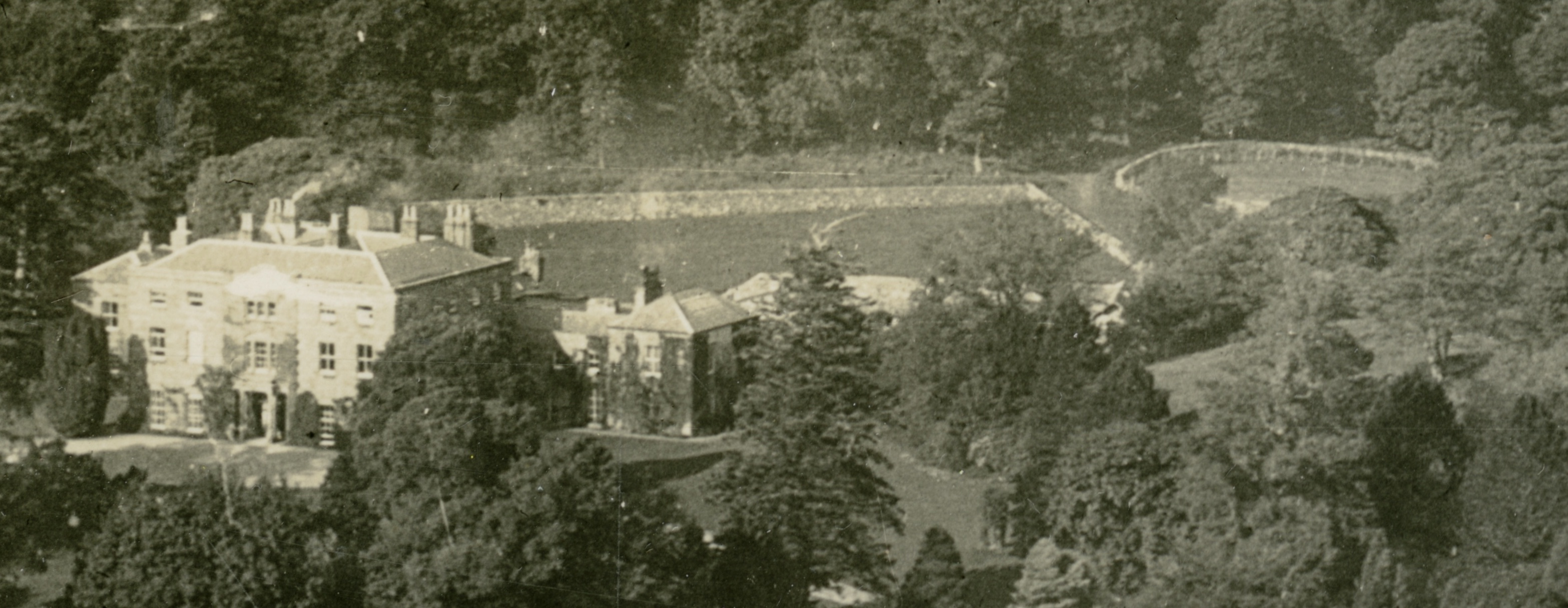
Aerial view of the property before the demolition of the wings

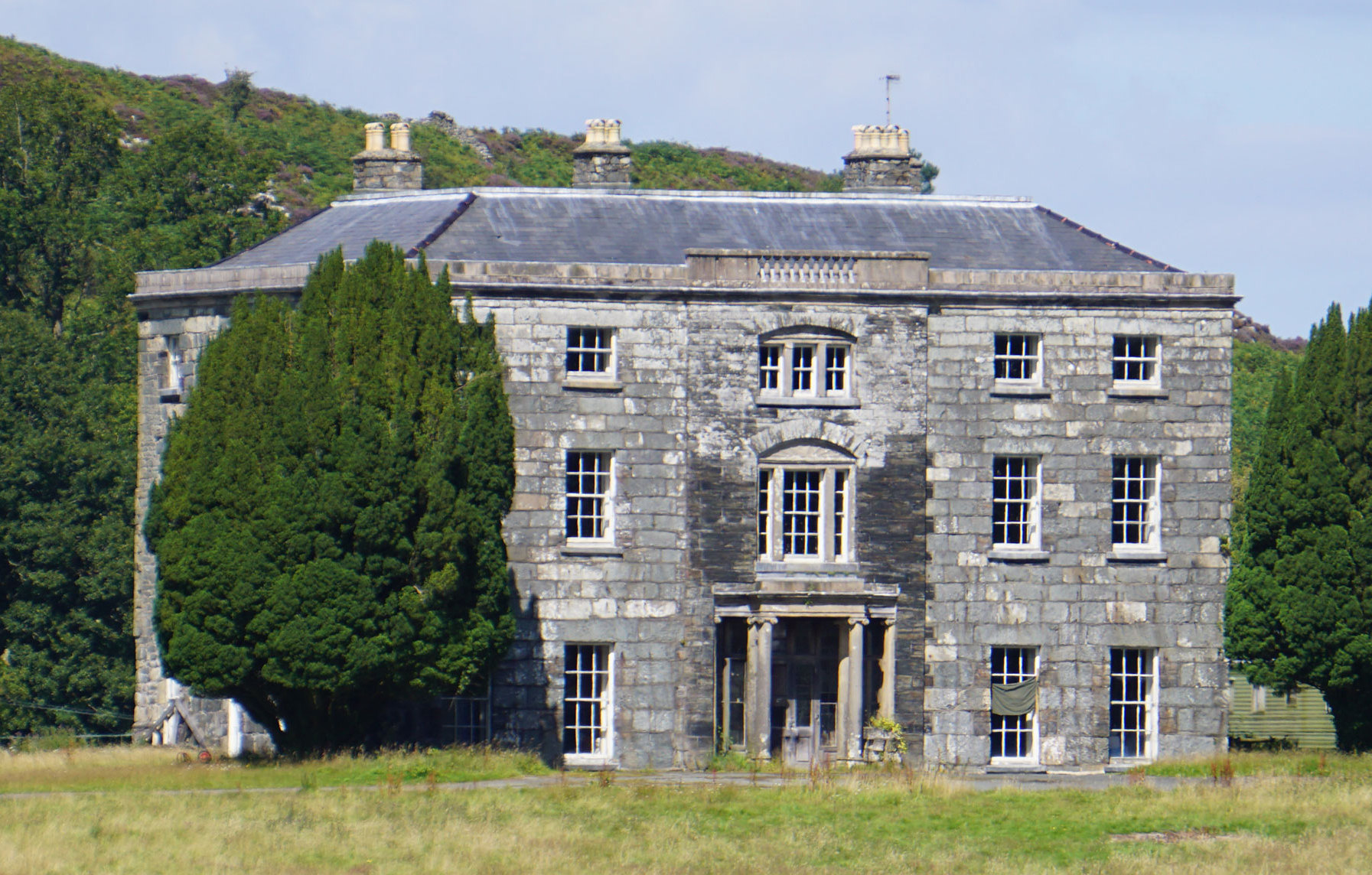
Main hall today

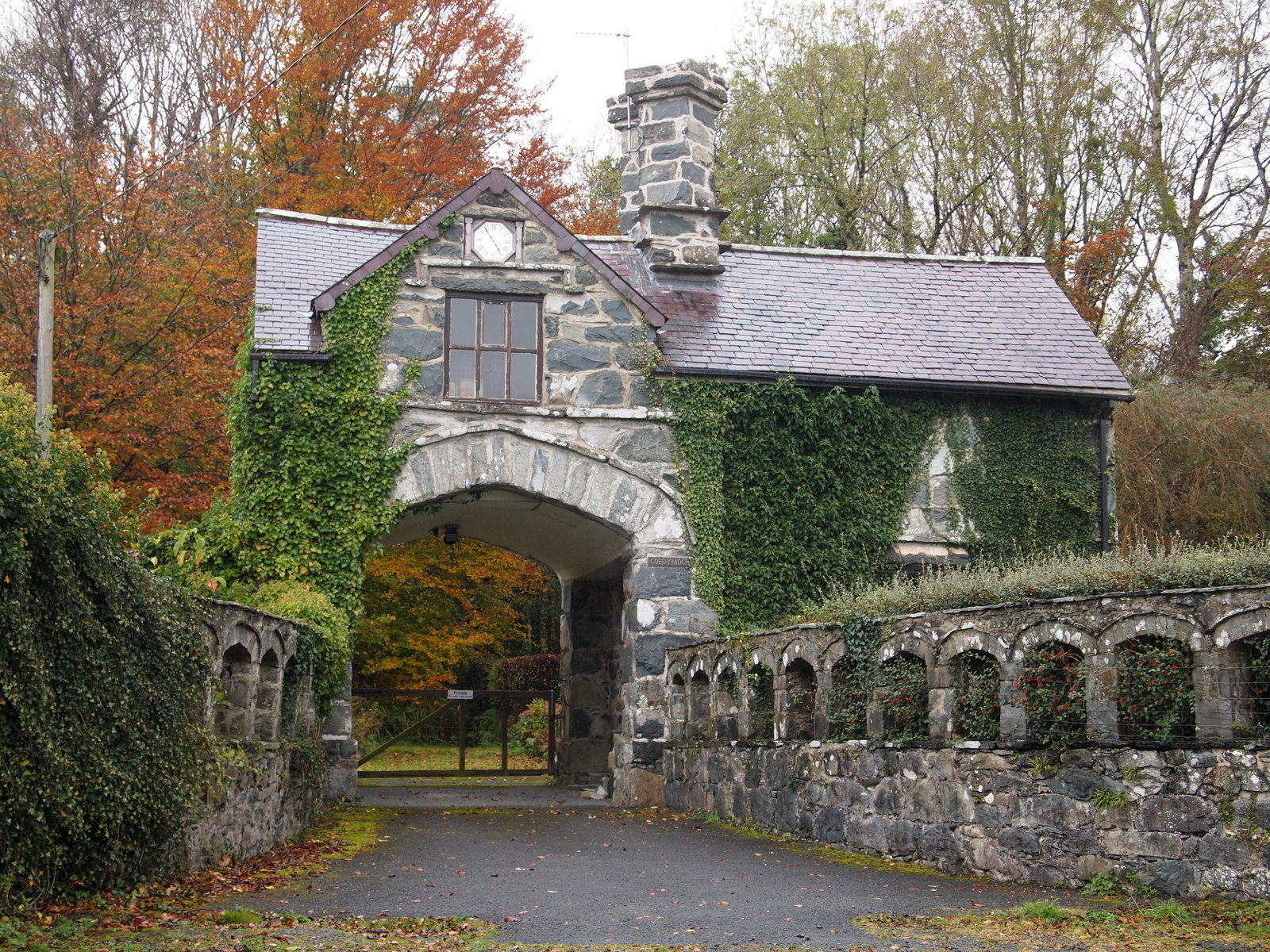
The gatehouse

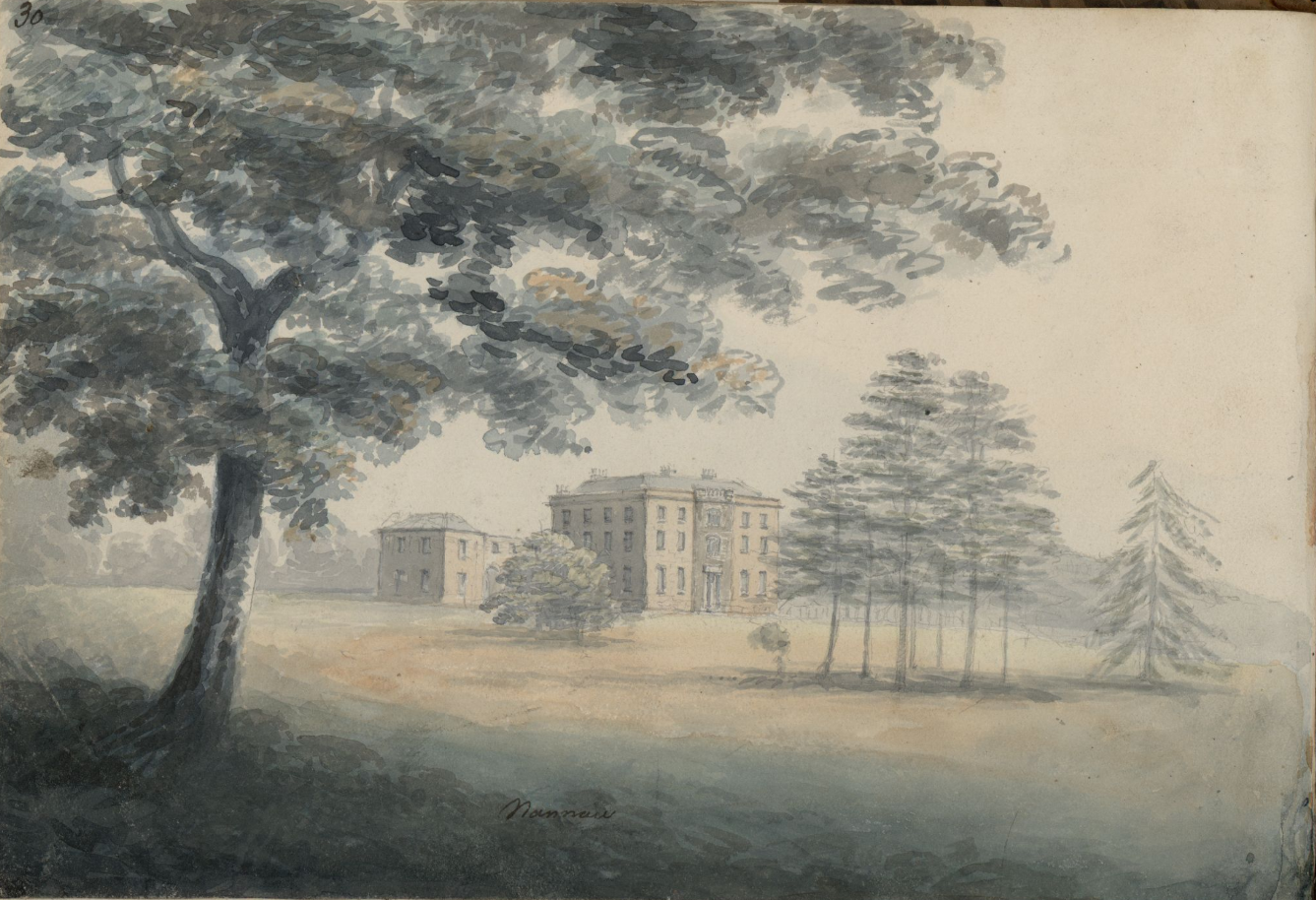
Nannau painted by Moses Griffith c. 1808.

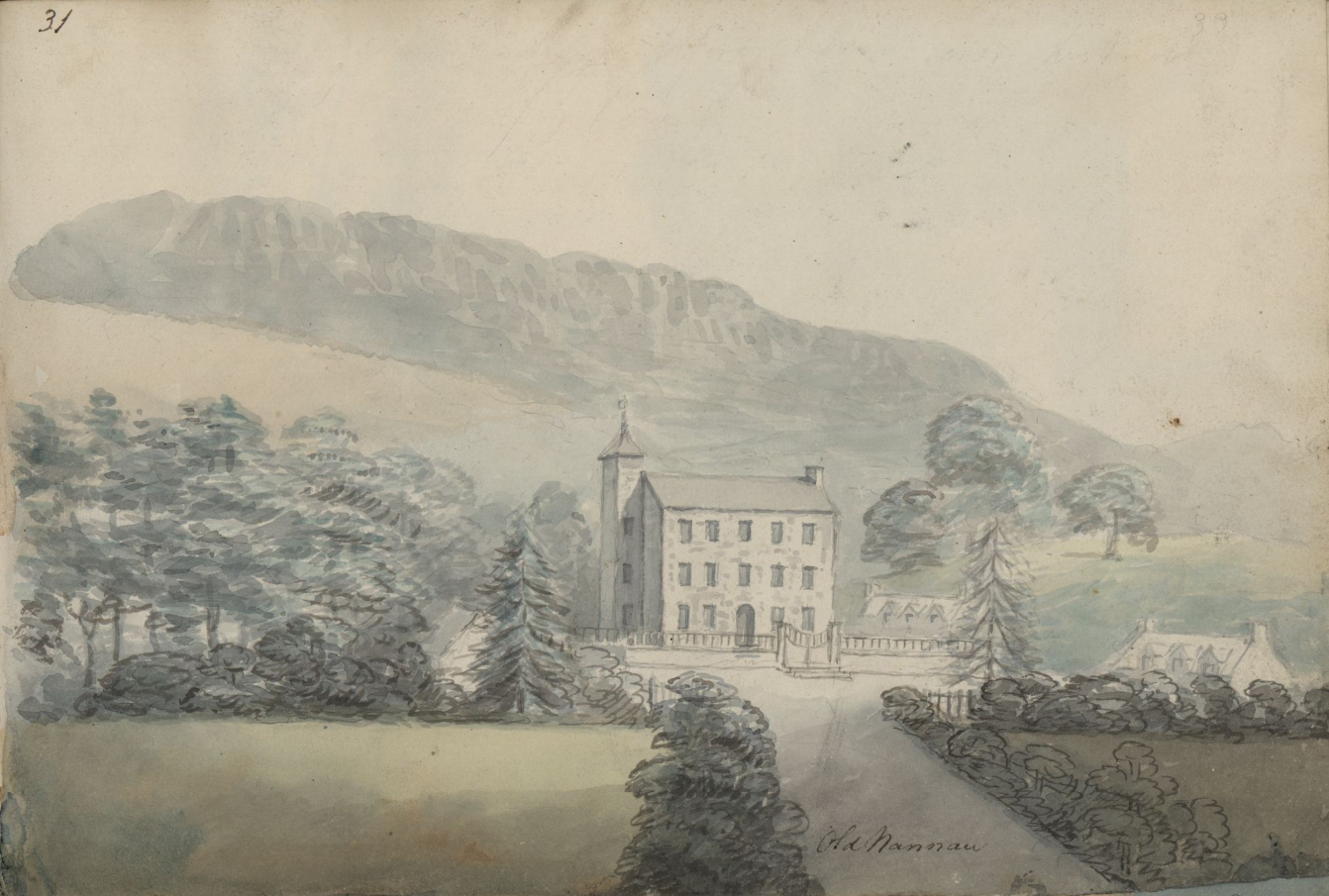
Old Nannau sketch by Moses Griffith 1797, built by Huw Nanney, circa 1697.

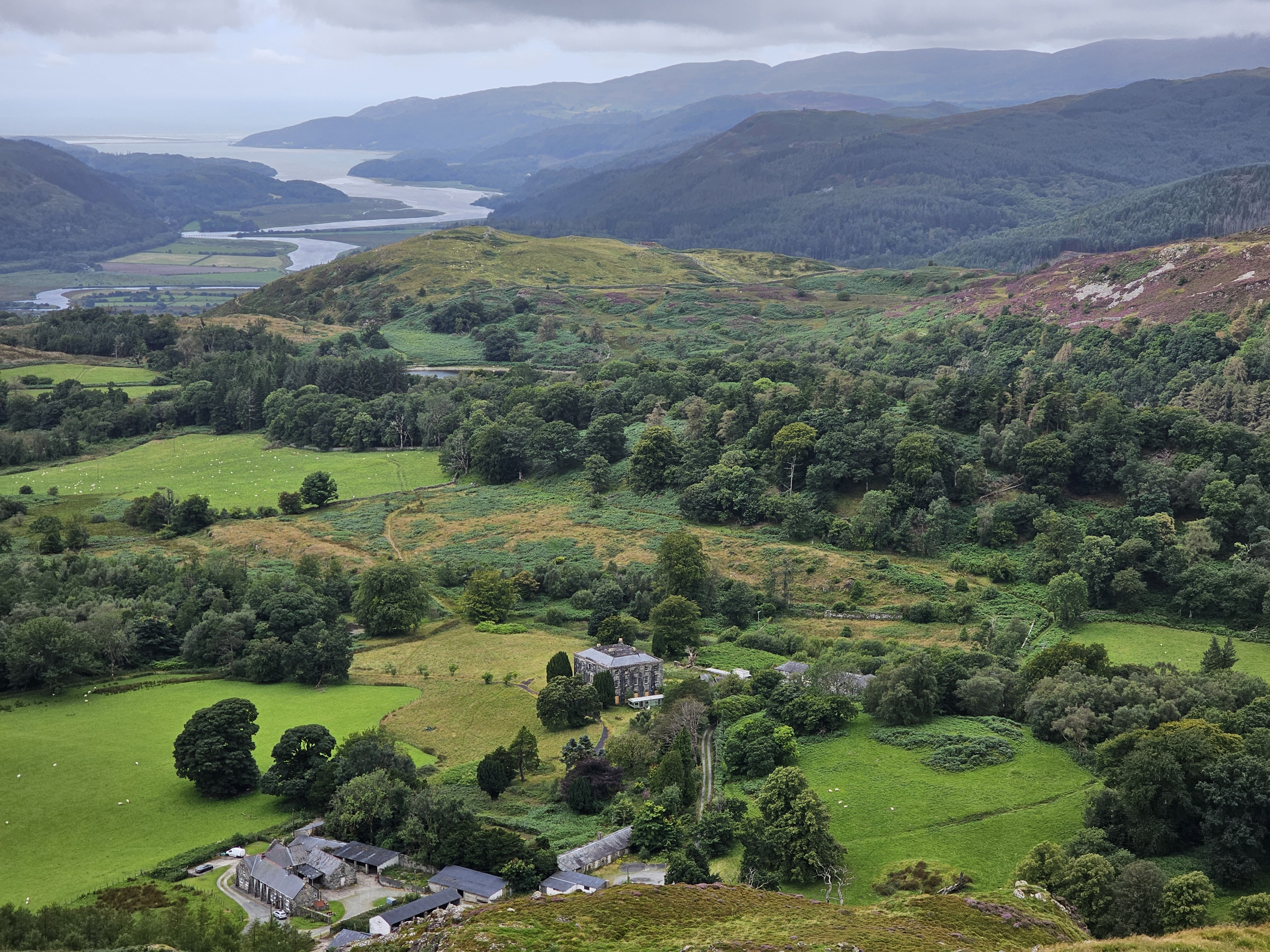
The ancient Nannau estate seen from the summit of Moel Offrwm

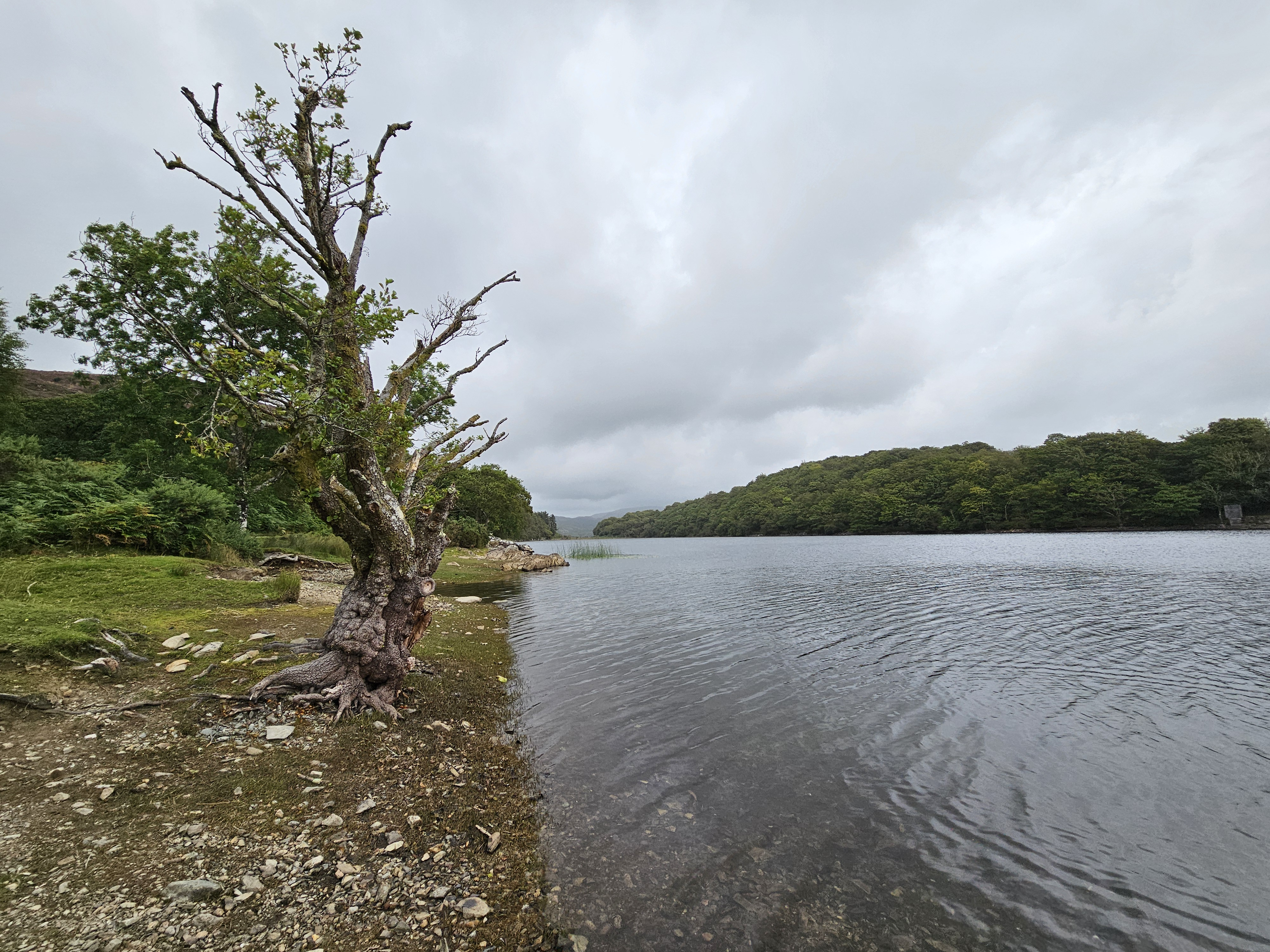
Llyn Cynwch, a natural ancient lake of Nannau

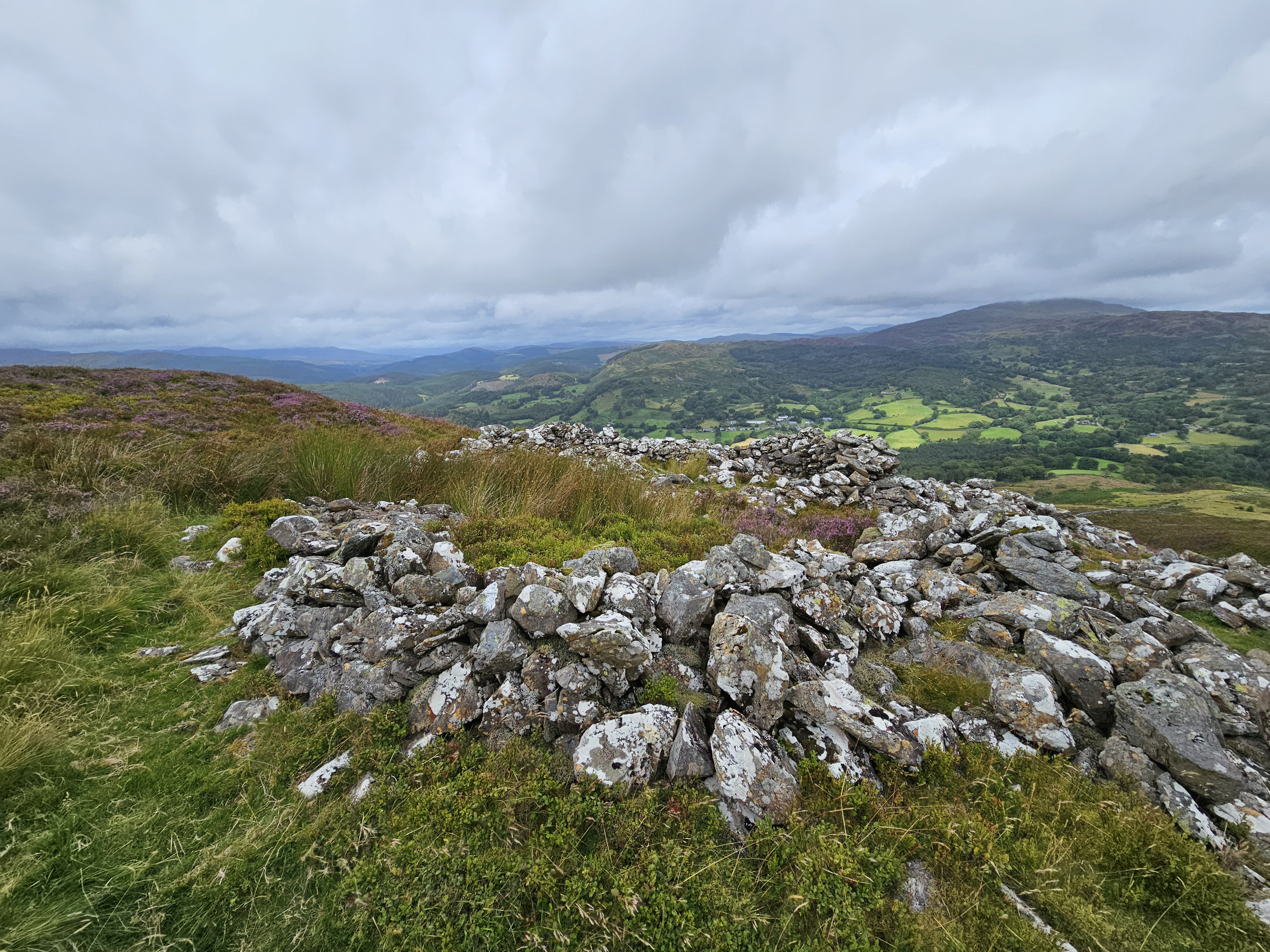
A Celtic hillfort on the summit of Moel Offrwm, part of the ancient Nannau estate

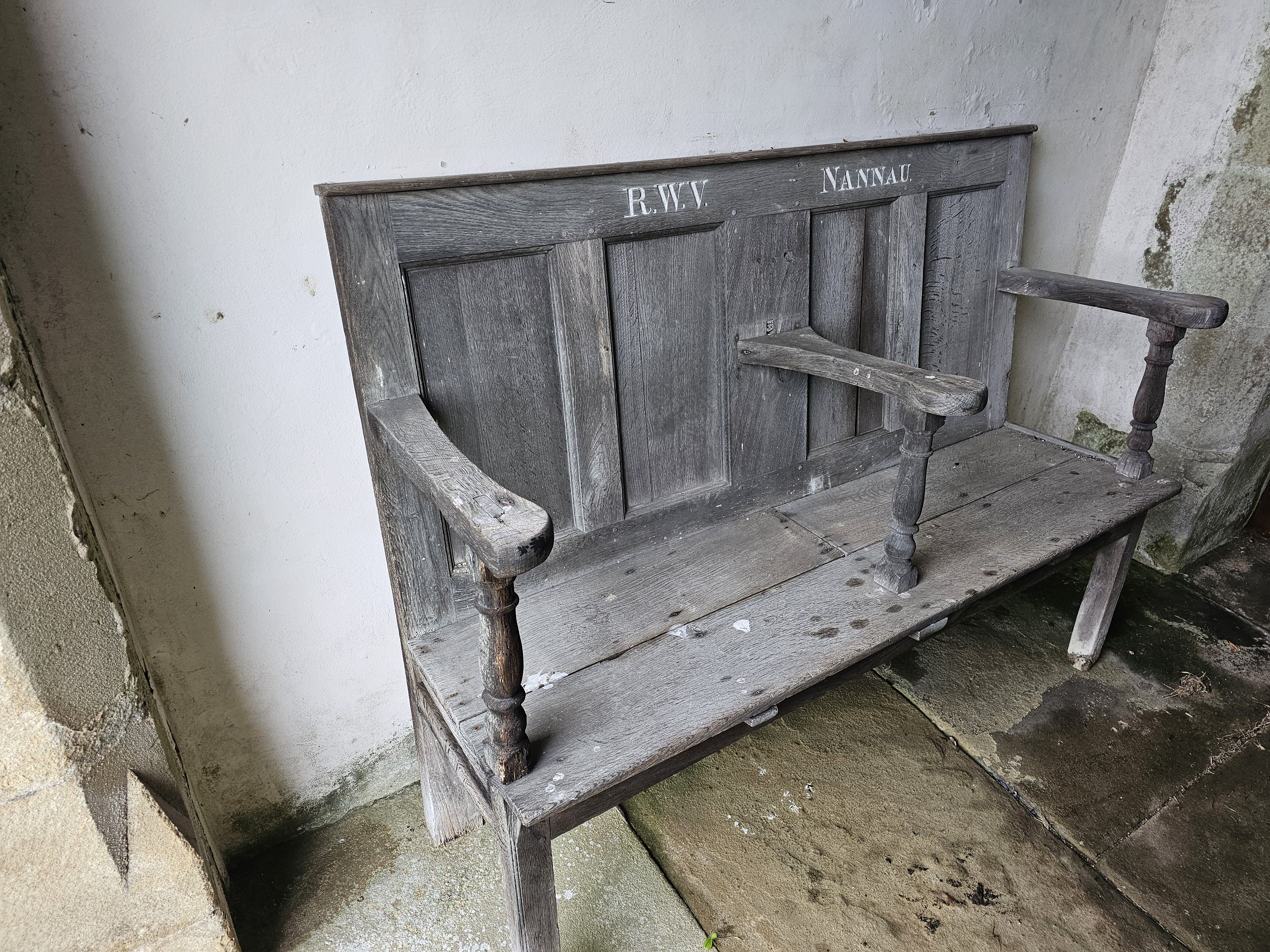
An original bench from Nannau Hall, now located at St Machreths Church in Llanfachreth

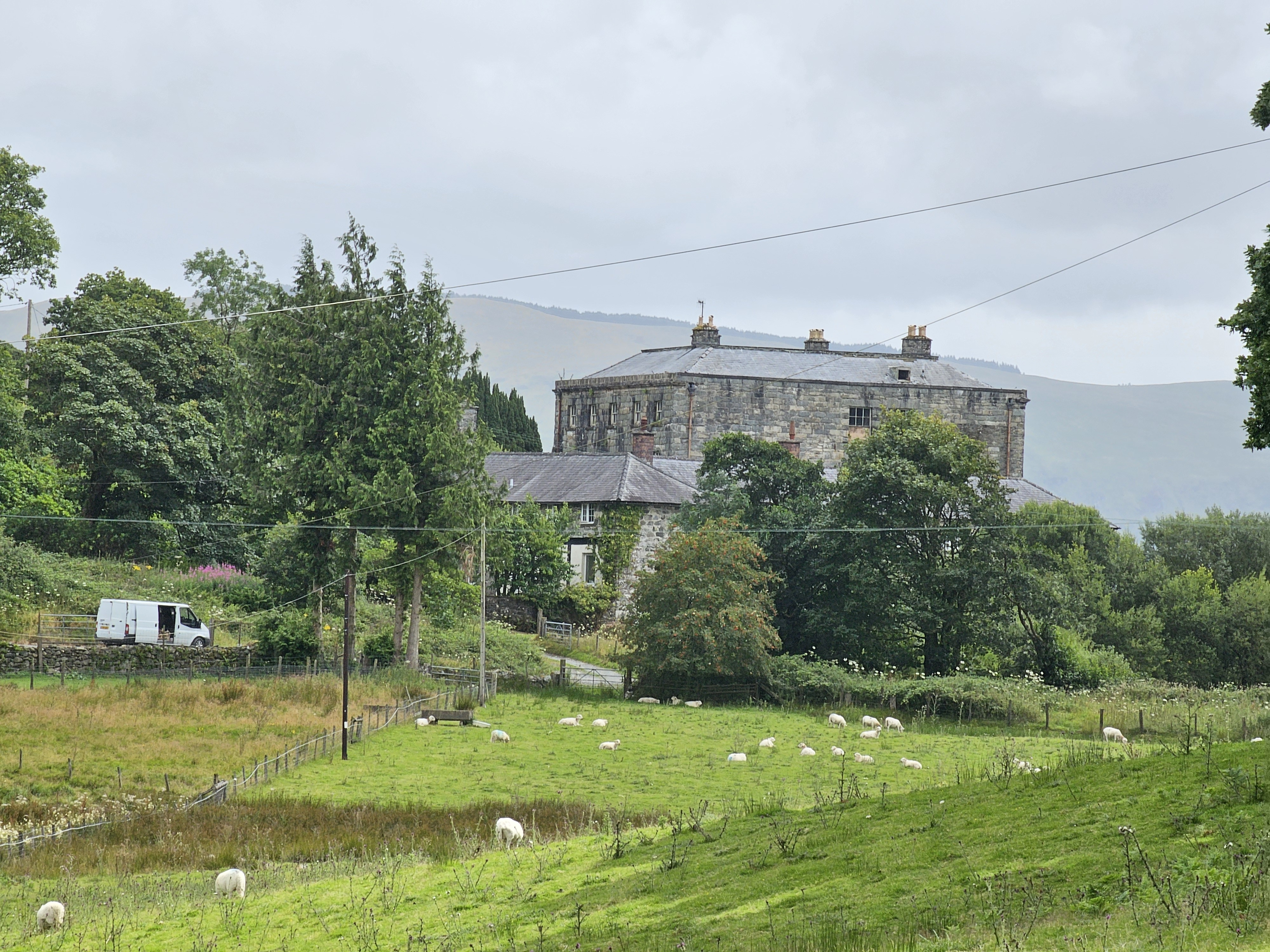
Nannau Hall from the start of Precipice Walk

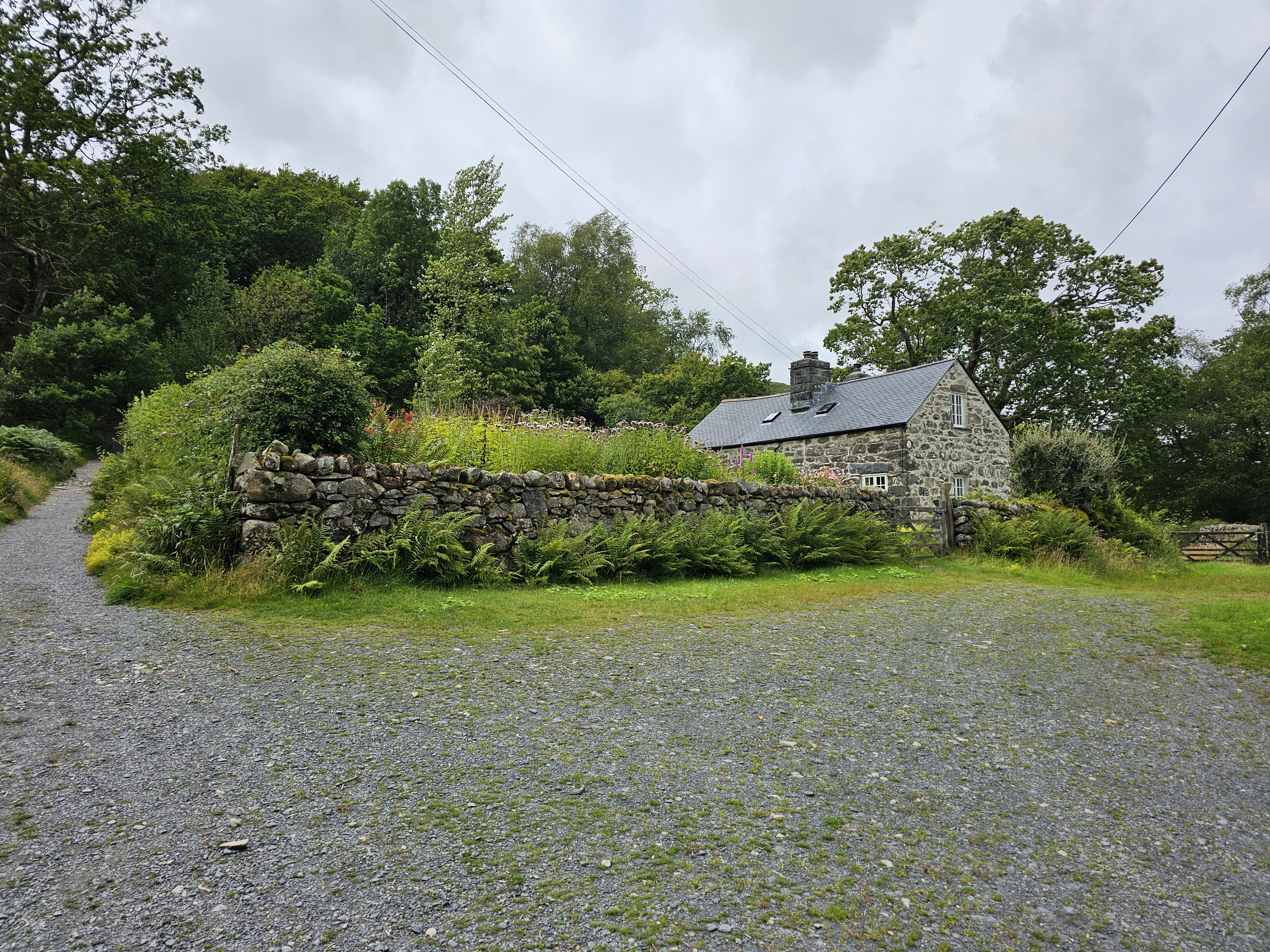
Gwernoffeiriad Cottage of the old Nannau estate

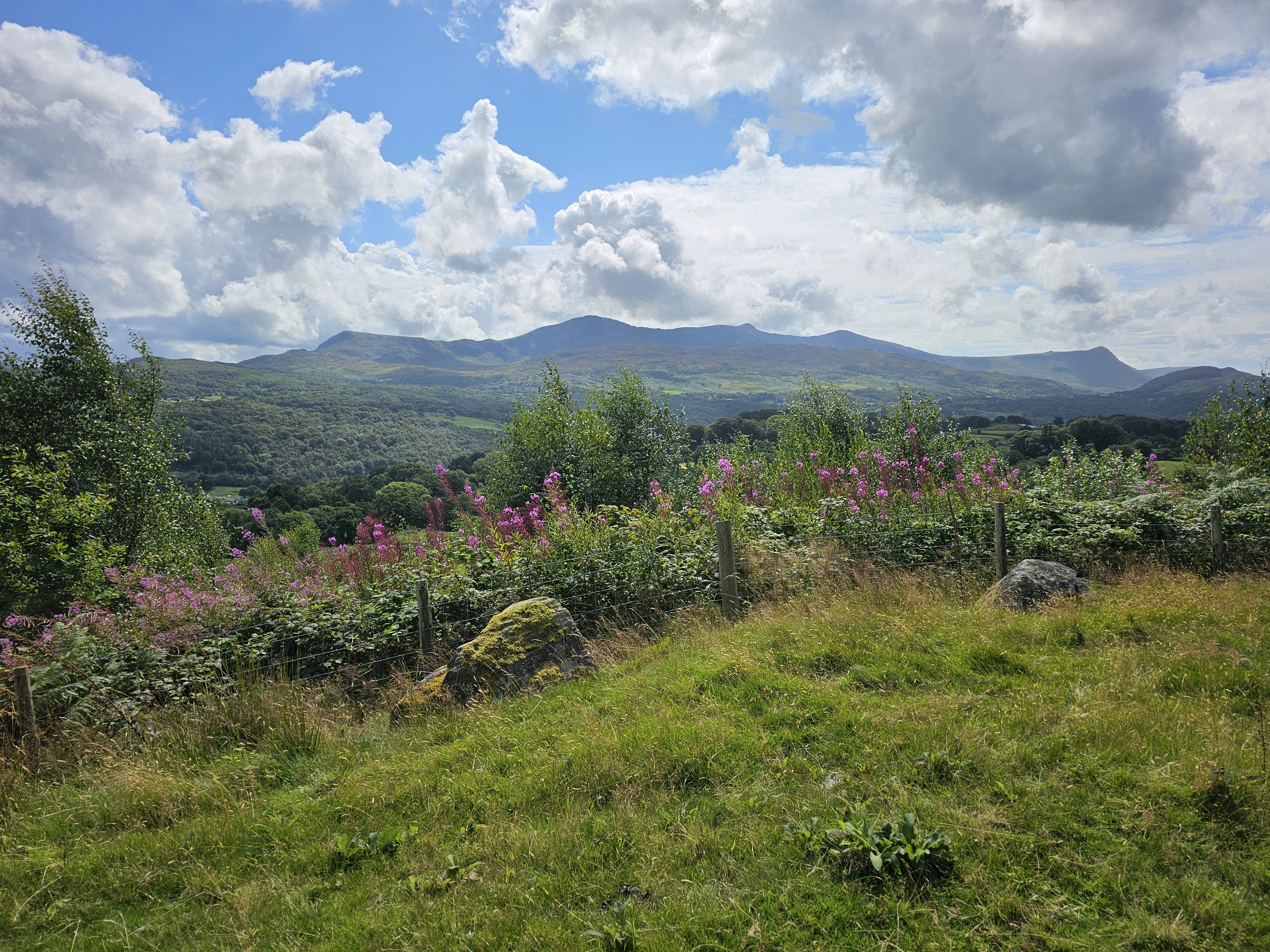
Cader Idris mountain from the ancient Nannau Deer Park

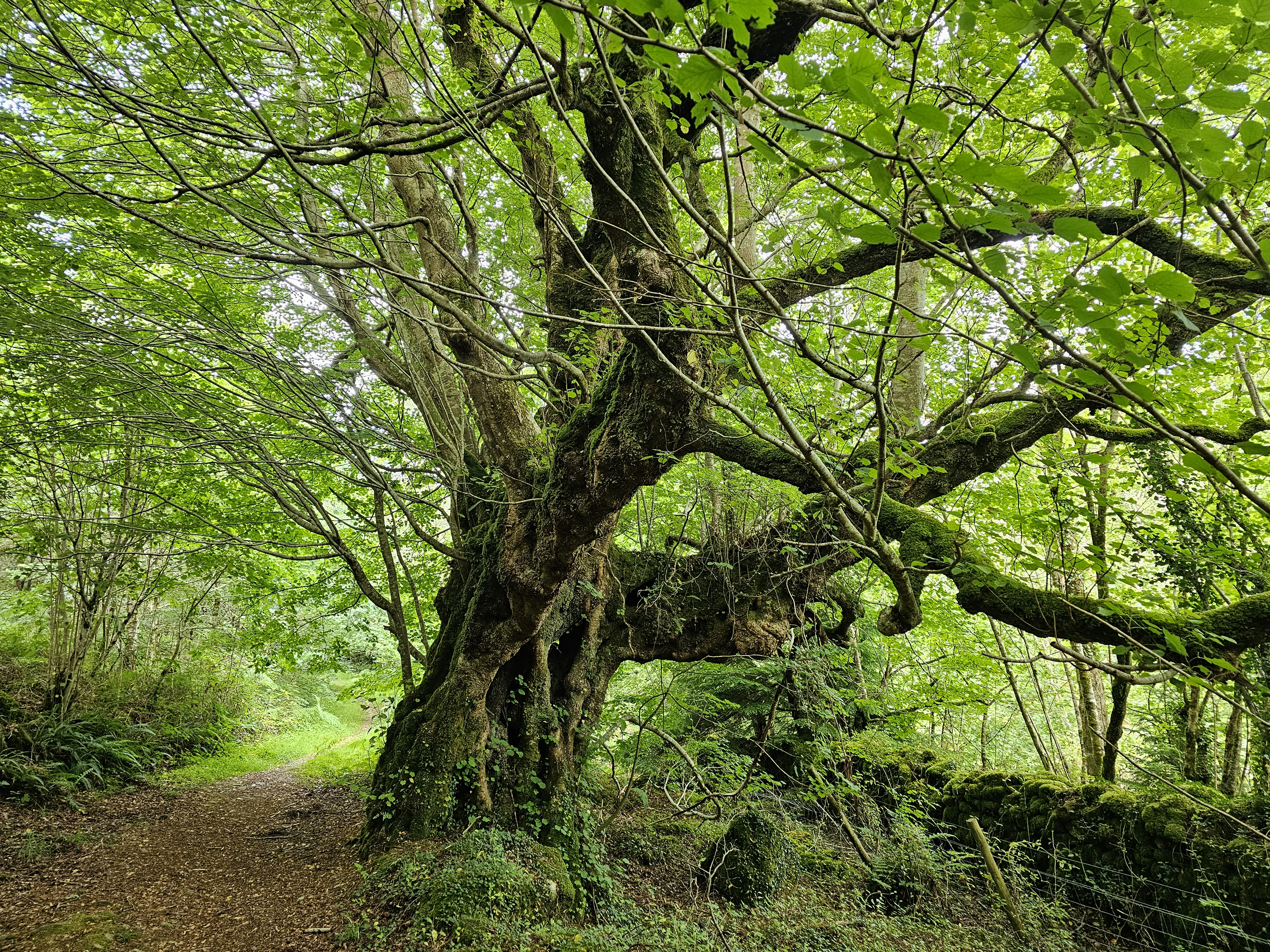
An ancient oak tree on an old winter carriage road of Nannau

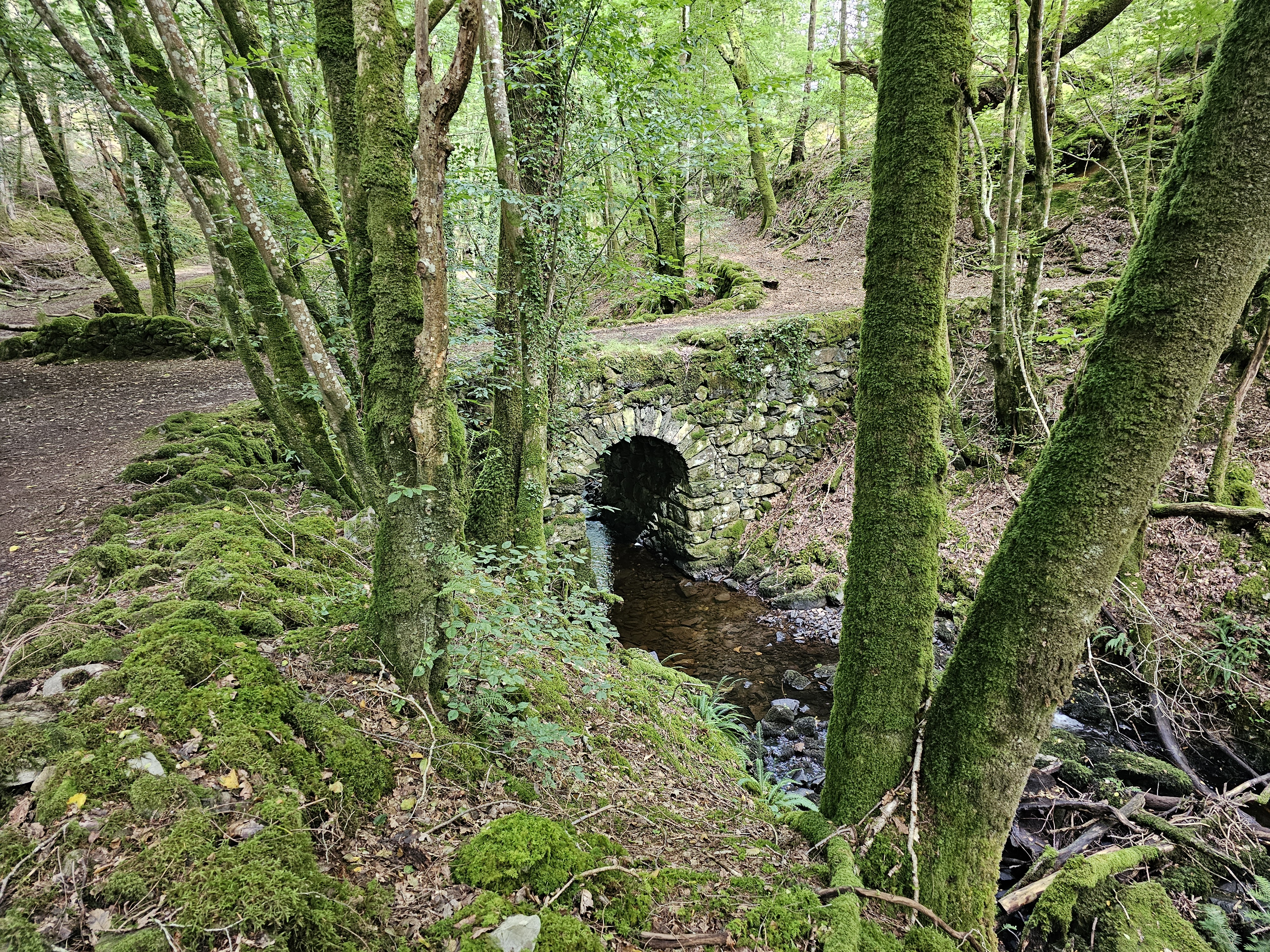
Bont y Llew, Lion Bridge, on an old winter driveway of Nannau

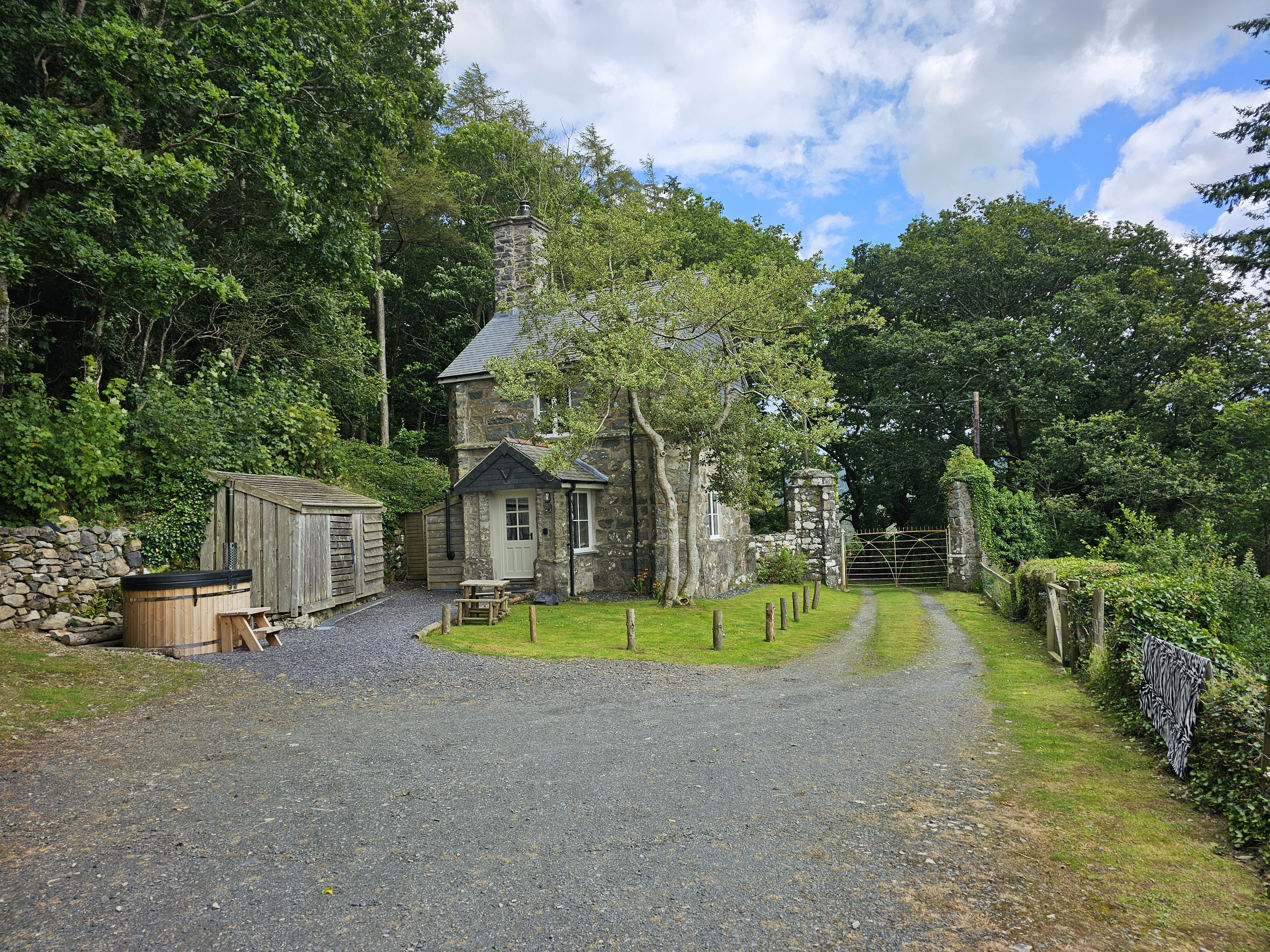
The South Deer Park Lodge of Nannau, or Lower Lodge, is a gatehouse to the Nannau Deer Park

== See also ==
- Grade II* listed buildings in Wales
- Kinmel Hall
- Penrhyn Castle

== Sources ==
- Bartrum, P. C., ed. (1974). Welsh Genealogies: AD 300-1400. Cardiff: University of Wales Press. doi:10.20391/40837b6f-1887-4afd-9c6e-9b7e3a122693. ISBN 070830561X. Archived from the original on 6 June 2023.
- Haslam, Richard; Orbach, Julian; Voelcker, Adam (2009). Gwynedd. The Buildings of Wales. New Haven, US and London: Yale University Press. ISBN 978-0-300-14169-6. OCLC 1023292902.
- Stephenson, David (2016). Medieval Powys: Kingdom, Principality and Lordships, 1132-1293. Studies in Celtic History. Boydell & Brewer. ISBN 9781783271405.
- Williams, Philip Nanney (2016). Nannau - A Rich Tapestry of Welsh History. Llwyn Estates Publications. ISBN 978-0-9955337-0-7.
- E. D. Jones, 'The family of Nannau of Nannau' (Cylchgrawn Cymdeithas Hanes Sir Feirionnyd, 1933)
- Pennant, Thomas (1784). A Tour in Wales. Vol. 3. p. 96. "Thomas Francis Roberts, 1883"
- One or more of the preceding sentences incorporates text from a publication now in the public domain: Chisholm, Hugh, ed. (1911). "Dolgelley". Encyclopædia Britannica. Vol. 8 (11th ed.). Cambridge University Press. "Dolgellau"
