= Sir Robert Vaughan, 2nd Baronet =

Welsh landowner, baronet and politician

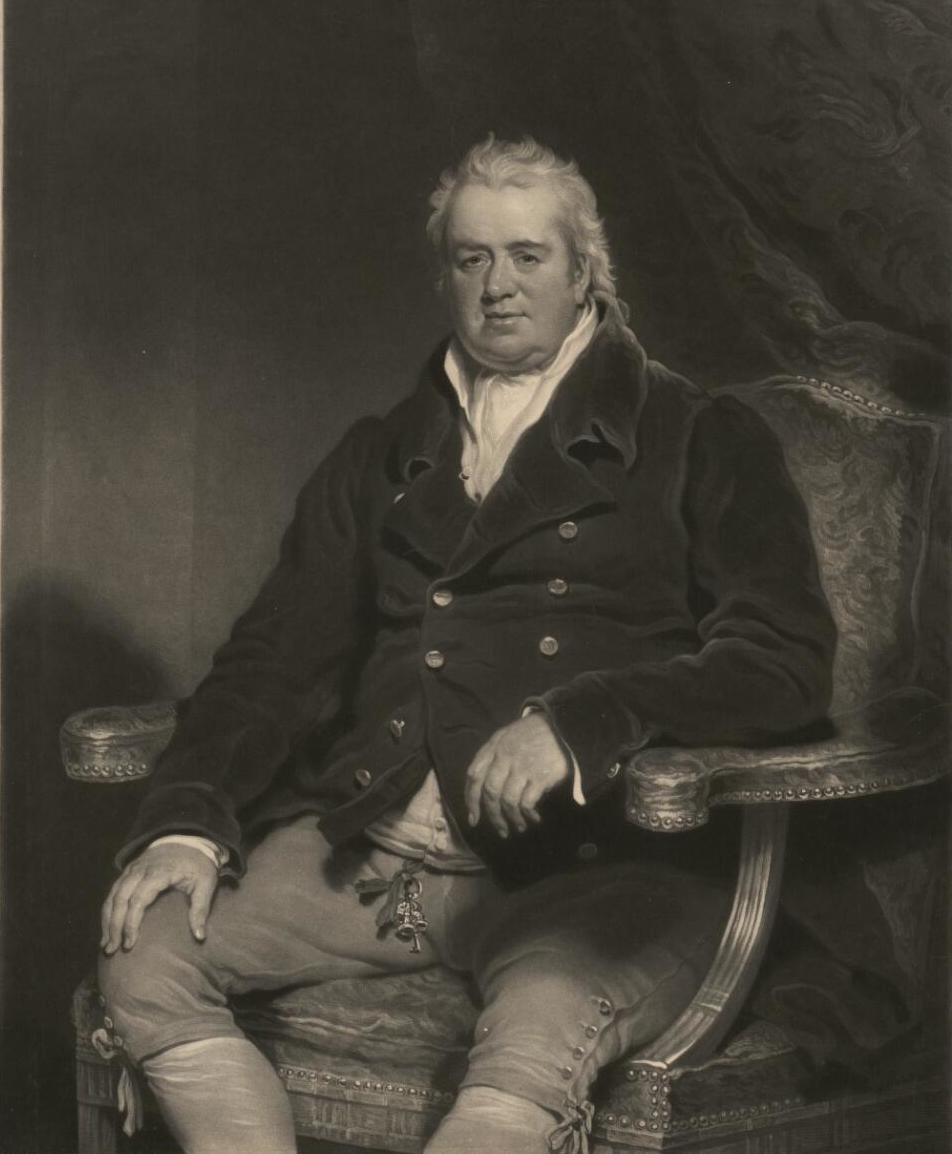
Mezzotint engraving of Sir Robert Vaughan by Charles Turner; 1833

Sir Robert Williames Vaughan, 2nd Baronet (29 March 1768 – 22 April 1843), was a Welsh landowner and Tory politician who sat in the House of Commons for 40 years from 1792 to 1836.

== Nannau house ==
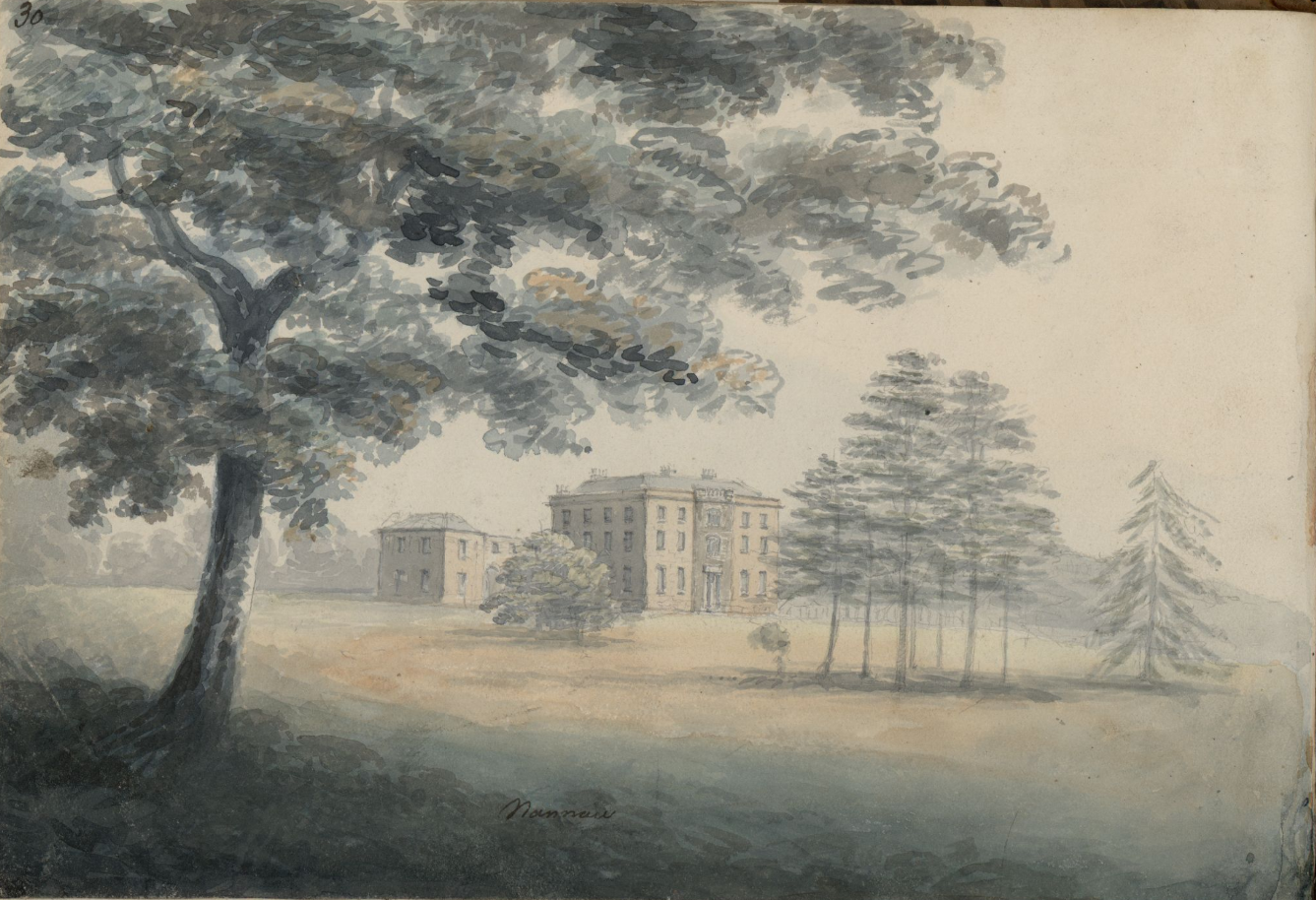
Nannau estate painted in 1808, by Moses Griffith (artist)

In 1800, Vaughan embarked on a life long journey to redesign his home and neighbouring areas. He lavishly rebuilt the Georgian home of Nannau, and designed the surrounding estate; he completed the job with the help from Joseph Bromfield, who created a pavilion wing and some internal features after a fire in 1808. He took inspiration from an architectural book written by Peter Frederick Robinson, but added subtle alterations to the designs inspired by Tudor architecture.

=== Estate ===
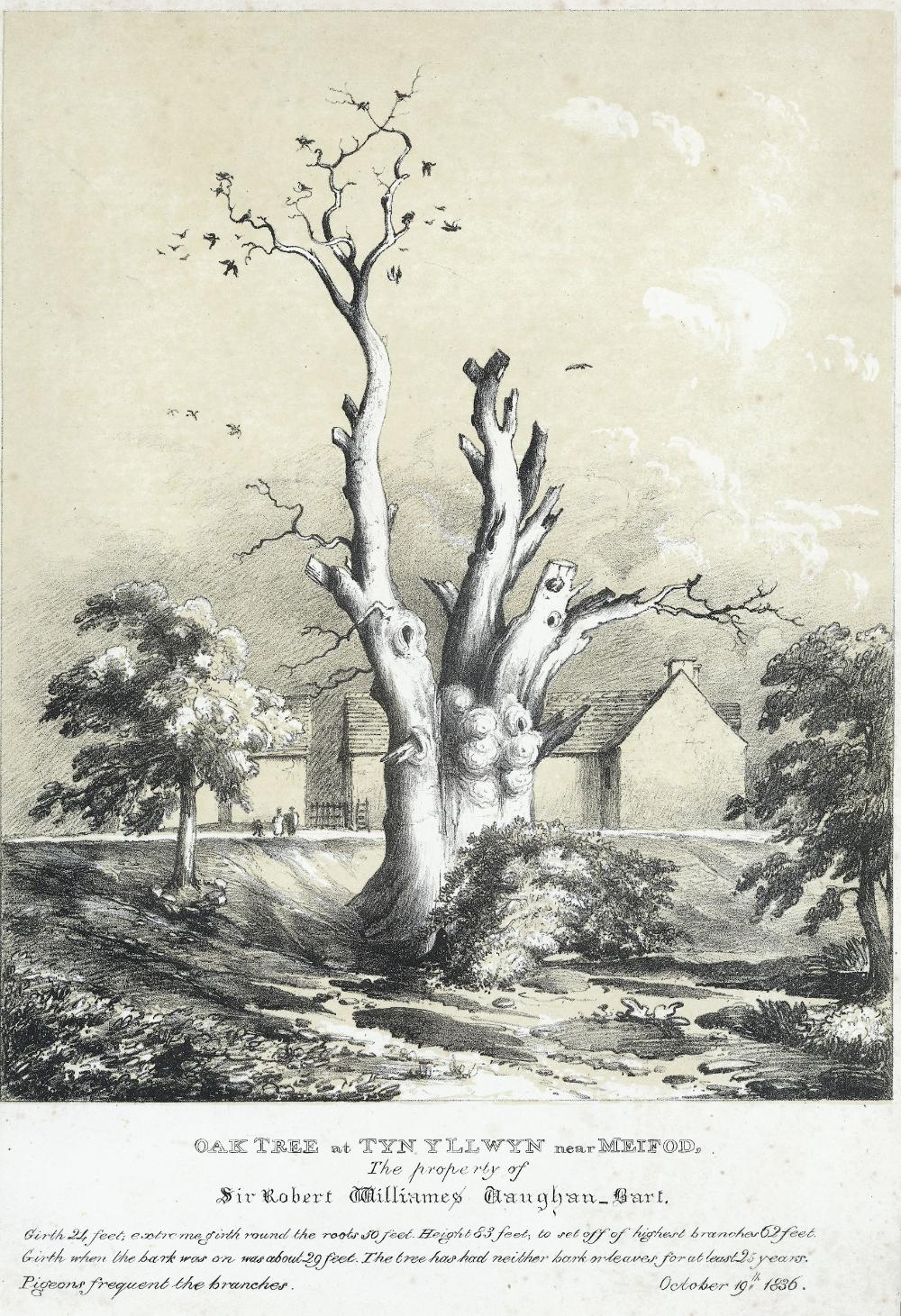
Nannau Oak the day it felled in 1813 by Sir Richard Hoare

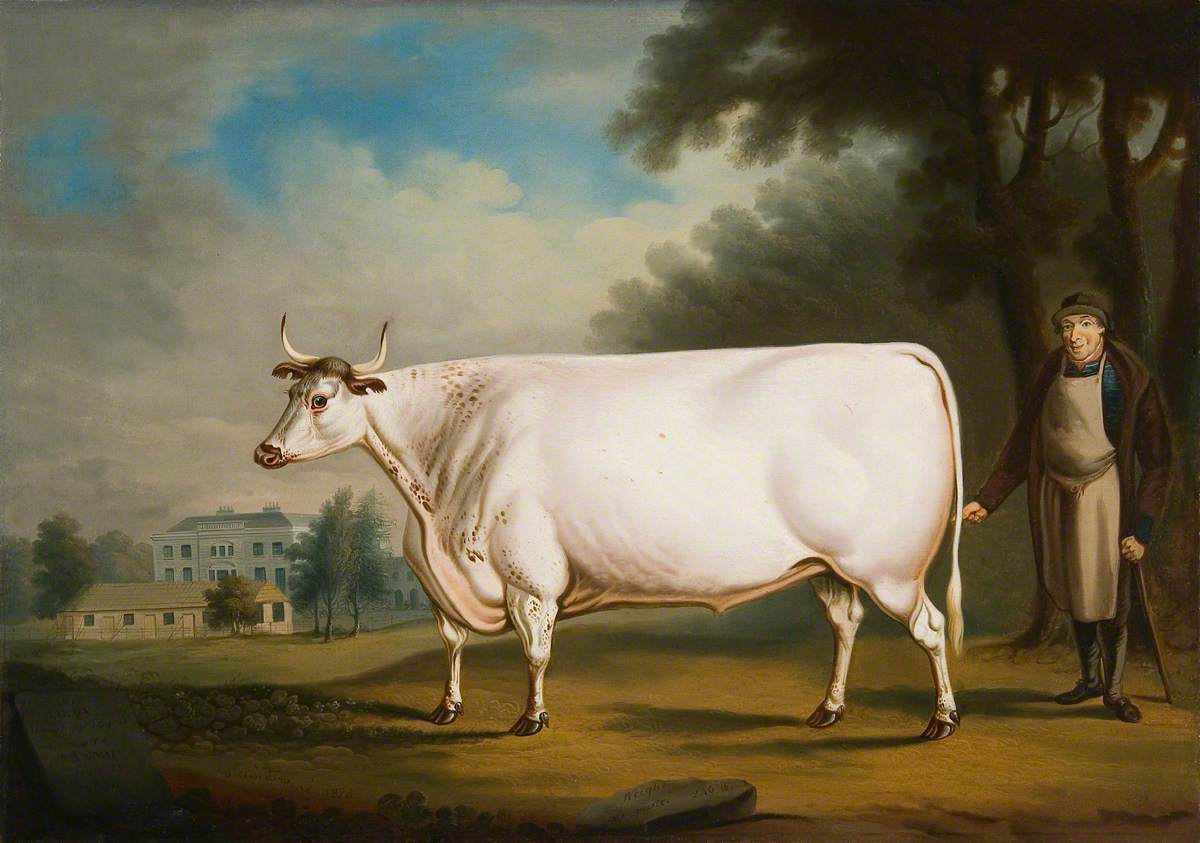
'The White Ox of Nannau' painted by Daniel Clowes (1774-1829)

All around the 10,164 acre estate and Llanfachreth village, 55 miles of walling was built, for such a task, he kept 18 horses and mules, with 9 men operating carts (carters). Two farms and ten cottages were built on the estate. Then five arches and one lodge were constructed between 1820–30, and another lodge named after his ancestor Hywel Sele, and a deer park, miles more of carriage driveways and a fishing pond too. He also turned his attention to Dolgellau by rebuilding the town centre.

On the estate of Nannau were several famous things including one placed there by Sir Robert Vaughan, the 'Nannau bucket' a late Bronze Age urn discovered in nearby Arthog. Vaughan had an interest in antiquarianism and collected such items. Also on the estate was the Nannau Oak which was felled in a summer lightning storm in 1813, the tree famous for being the deathbed of his ancestor Hywel Sele, named 'Derwen Ceubren yr Ellyll' (English: 'the hollow oak of the demon'). The oak was subsequently used for various things such as a stirrup cup during his only son's 21st birthday, which is still considered one of Wales' grandest birthdays. In 1824, the famous white Nannau Ox, the last of its herd, was slaughtered for the coming-of-age celebrations at Nannau.

== Politician ==
Vaughan was elected MP for Merioneth in 1792, holding the seat continuously through 14 Parliaments until he was forced to retire in 1836. He also continued to work with Oxford university, he chaired a meeting for gentlemen in Wales who studied at Jesus college like he had, until at least 1819. He was appointed High Sheriff of Merionethshire for 1837–38.

== Family and personal life ==
Vaughan was the eldest son of Sir Robert Howell Vaughan, 1st Baronet, of Hengwrt, Merionethshire who died a year after being created baronet; Robert Vaughan 2nd baronet was educated at Jesus College, Oxford (1787). He succeeded his father on 13 October 1792, his father was buried at St Illtyd's Church, Llanelltyd. Sir Robert inherited the 12,000 acre Nannau estate and farms, as well as Ystum Colwyn, Meillionydd; and the Hengwrt estate, whilst his brother who changed his name to Edward Salesbury inherited the Rhug estate. His brother Edward pursued a career in the military, rising to Colonel of the 1st Regiment of Foot Guards, before his death in battle in 1807, therefore his younger brother Griffith inherited Rhug.

He married Anna Maria, the daughter of Sir Roger Mostyn, 5th Baronet, of Mostyn, Flintshire and Gloddaeth, Caernarvonshire on 23 September 1802.

Before he died he had to settle the family finances, there was the lavish expense amounted from his son's coming of age party, but worse so were his brother's debts which he had to take care of after his death, these in 1842 amounted to £250,000 (equivalent to £29,700,000 in 2023). Sir Robert Williames Vaughan died in April, 1843. He left his estates at Nannau, Hengwrt, Meillionydd and Ystumcolwyn to his son, the 3rd and final of the Vaughan baronets, this was the last time they would be in the common ownership of one person.

Parliament of Great Britain
Preceded by Evan Lloyd Vaughan	Member of Parliament for Merioneth; 1792—1800	Succeeded by Parliament of the United Kingdom
Parliament of the United Kingdom
Preceded by Parliament of Great Britain	Member of Parliament for Merioneth; 1801—1836	Succeeded by Richard Richards
Baronetage of Great Britain
Preceded by Robert Howell Vaughan	Baronet (of Nannau); 1792–1843	Succeeded by Robert Williames Vaughan
