= Vaughan baronets =

Welsh nobles, titular baronets of Nannau

Escutcheon of the Vaughan baronets of Nannau

The Vaughan Baronetcy, of Nannau in the County of Merioneth, was a title in the Baronetage of Great Britain. It was created on 28 July 1791, at the end of his life, for Robert Howell Vaughan, a Merionethshire landowner. He was a descendant of Robert Vaughan, the antiquarian.

The 2nd Baronet was Member of Parliament for Merioneth for over 40 years, from 1792 to 1836, during seven parliaments. The title became extinct on the death of the 3rd Baronet in 1859.

== Vaughan baronets, of Nannau (1791) ==
- Sir Robert Howell Vaughan, 1st Baronet (c. 1738–1792)
- Sir Robert Williames Vaughan, 2nd Baronet (c. 1768–1843)
- Sir Robert Williames Vaughan, 3rd Baronet (1803–1859)

Baronetage of Great Britain
Preceded by Pole baronets	Vaughan baronets of Nannau; 28 July 1791	Succeeded by Rich baronets
