= John Davies (bard) =

John Davies (died 1694), also known by his bardic name of Siôn Dafydd Las, was a Welsh bard active in the late 17th century. He is thought to have been from the Llanuwchllyn area of North Wales, and he may have lived in the Tyn-y-ffridd area for a while.

He and his contemporaries were some of the last of the group of bards patronized by wealthy Welsh families, and is believed to have been the last "household bard" retained in Merionethshire. He is known to have sung his poetry to the families of Doluwcheogryd, Dolau-gwyn, Bodysgallen, Corsygedol, Gloddaeth, Glyncywarch, Nannau, Maes-y-neuadd, Cefnamwlch, Maesypandy, and Tan-y-bwlch. Transcripts of his work were made by Edward Edwards in the early 20th century.

His works are believed to include the air now known as "Pant Corlan yr Wyn" ("Lamb's Fold Valley"), formerly known as "Dafydd y Garreg Las" ("David of the Blue Rock"). He also wrote an elegy on the death of King Charles II of England (died 1685), and elegies on the deaths of two brother poets - Edward Morris of Perthillwydion (died 1689) and Morris Parry, parson of Llanelian (died 1683).

His nephew, David Jones of Trefriw, became a poet, a collector of manuscripts and a publisher and printer.
