= Hywel Sele =

Welsh nobleman

- The discovery of the body of Hywel Sele in the Nannau Oak
- Died: 1402; Nannau Estate, Wales

Hywel Sele (died c. 1402) was a Welsh nobleman. A cousin of Owain Glyndŵr, Prince of Wales, he was a friend of Henry IV of England and opposed his cousin's 1400–1415 uprising. Sele was captured by Glyndŵr but is said to have accepted an invitation to hunt with his cousin on the Nannau Estate. Sele attempted to kill Glyndŵr but failed and was himself killed, his body being hidden within the hollow of an oak tree. The oak is subsequently said to have been haunted and was named Derwen Ceubren yr Ellyl ("The Hollow Oak of the Devils") or Ceubren yr Ellyll ("The Hollow Tree of the Ghost").

== Biography ==
Hywel Sele was a distant cousin of Owain Glyndŵr (c. 1359 – c. 1415), the last native Prince of Wales. Sele was a friend of the English King Henry IV and due to this was opposed to the Glyndŵr Rising. According to Richard Vaughan of Nannau (c. 1650), Sele sided against Glyndŵr, was captured and an attempt to free him was defeated in a battle at Beddau’r Gwŷr. The abbot of Cymer Abbey brokered a reconciliation between the two men and they later went hunting together in the Nannau Estate.

It is said that during the hunt Sele drew his bow to shoot Glyndŵr. However Glyndŵr anticipated this and struck Sele with his sword before he could release the arrow. Fearing repercussions from the abbot, Glyndŵr hid Sele's body in a hollow in an ancient oak tree. This subsequently became known as Derwen Ceubren yr Ellyl ("The Hollow Oak of the Devils"). Glyndŵr burnt down Sele's estate, leaving Sele's 2-year-old son to be brought up by an uncle. A cousin of Sele, Gruffydd ap Gwyn of Ardudwy heard of the burning of the estate and set out to rescue his kinsman. But Glyndŵr ambushed Gruffydd's 200-strong force at Llanelltyd Bridge and killed sixty men before razing Gruffydd's own estates.

== Different accounts ==
There are significant differences in other accounts of Sele's life. In T. P. Ellis' 19th-century writings the sequence of events is reversed. Glyndŵr is said to have captured Sele and carried him to Llanelltud, where Gruffydd unsuccessfully attempted to release him. After Glyndŵr's victory the abbot attempted his reconciliation, and the fateful hunting expedition was carried out. In Ellis' version Glyndŵr, suspicious of Sele, survived by wearing a coat of mail beneath his clothes.

In William Wynne's History of Wales, the attempted killing of Glyndŵr takes place after Glyndŵr asked Sele to prove his skill with a bow and Gruffydd is said to have demolished the bridge at Llanelltud to prevent Glyndŵr's passage; his subsequent defeat taking place at Rhyd Cadwallon (a nearby ford) and in the surrounding countryside. John Humffreys Parry (1786–1825) relates another account in which the meeting came about by accident while Glyndŵr was hunting on Sele's land and a confrontation turned violent.

The story is regarded as a legend by Elissa R. Henken, who states that the story was at some point muddled and Sele's name sometime rendered as Huw Selef. She notes that some local people still regard the site of the tree as haunted. The story was also ascribed to legend by D. Helen Allday. Breverton states that there is some uncertainty over the date of the killing with 1402 given most credence, though some sources state 1404 or 1406. The story was well known among the inhabitants of Dolgellau.

== Nannau Oak ==
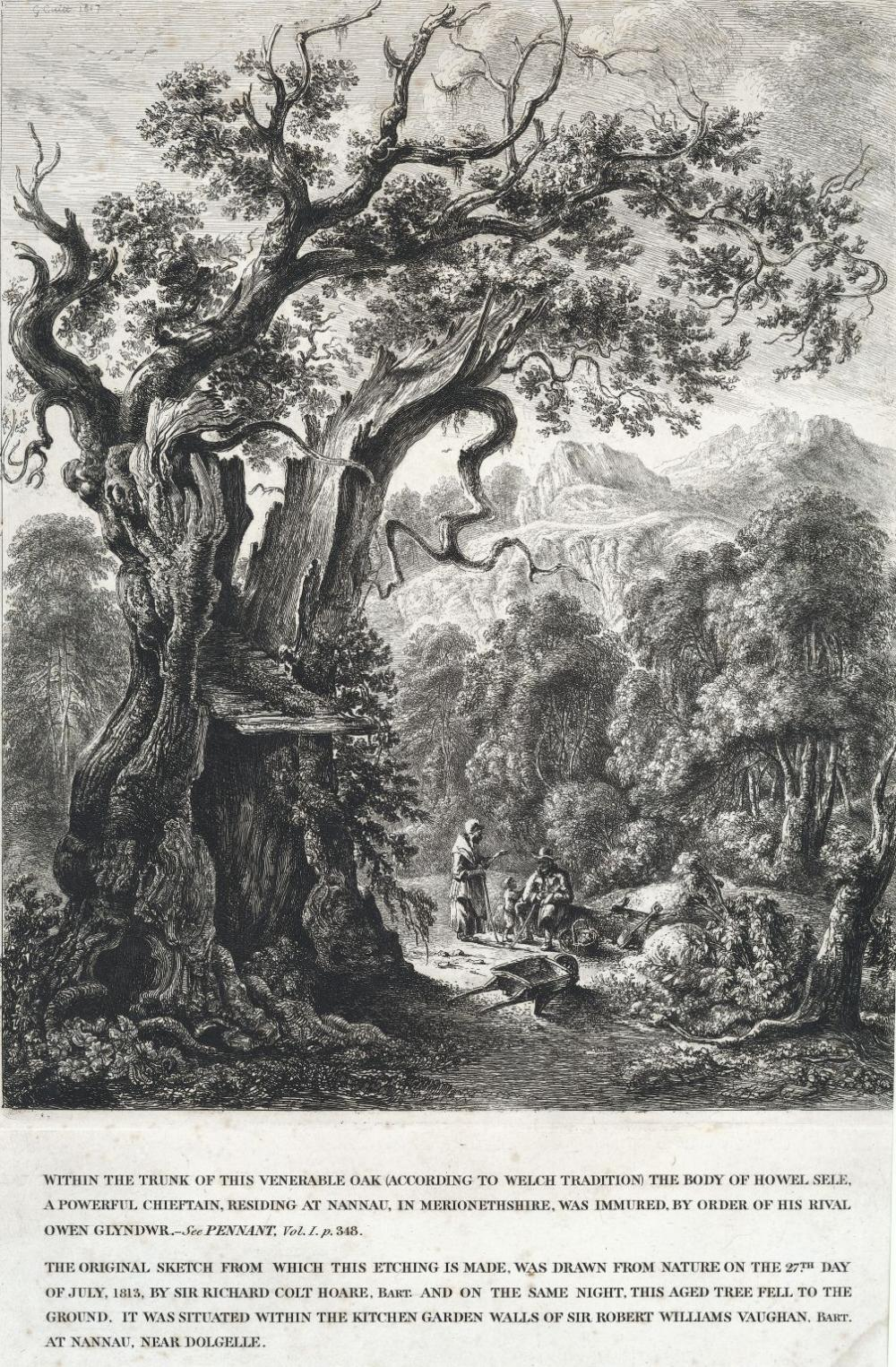
An engraving made from Hoare's 1813 drawing of the oak

The tree that supposedly entombed Sele subsequently became known as the Nannau Oak. Thomas Pennant inspected the oak in 1778 and noted that it was 27 feet 6 inches (8.38 m) in girth but that it was in an advanced state of decay. The tree was said to have resembled the shape of a gothic arch. The tree fell on 13 July 1813 and it was said that the body of Sele fell from within it and was laid to rest at Cymer Abbey. Sir Richard Colt Hoare was present at the time it fell and had completed a drawing of the tree that very morning. The drawing shows the tree in its decrepit state and damaged by lightning.

As with the rest of the story there are different versions of events. T. P. Ellis states that Sele's body lay within the tree only for forty years. He further notes that the oak was also known as Ceubren yr Ellyll ("The Hollow Tree of the Ghost") and was regarded as haunted, with people afraid to approach it at night.

The site of the tree was marked on the day it fell by a sundial and brass plate with a sketch of the tree. The landowner, a baronet, is said to have had the wood of the tree made into various utensils. It is also said that many houses in Dolgellau contained an engraving of the tree with a frame made from its wood. The tree was immortalised by Walter Scott in his 1808 work Marmion as "the spirit's Blasted Tree".
