= Nanney =

Nanney is a surname of Welsh origin Nannau, who were descendants of the princes of Powys, and their country estate at Dolgellau, North Wales.

- Griffith Nanney, member of the Parliament of England
- Hugh Nanney (c. 1669–1701), Welsh Member of Parliament and Vice-Admiral of North Wales
- Hugh Ellis-Nanney (1845–1920), British landowner, magistrate and Conservative politician
- Kevin "PPMD" Nanney (born 1990), professional Super Smash Bros. Melee player
- Owen Jones Ellis Nanney (1790–1870), Welsh politician
- Richard Nanney (1691–1767), 18th-century evangelical priest in north Wales
- Wendy Nanney (born 1965), Republican member of the South Carolina House of Representatives
