= John Yale (cleric) =

Clergyman from Wales

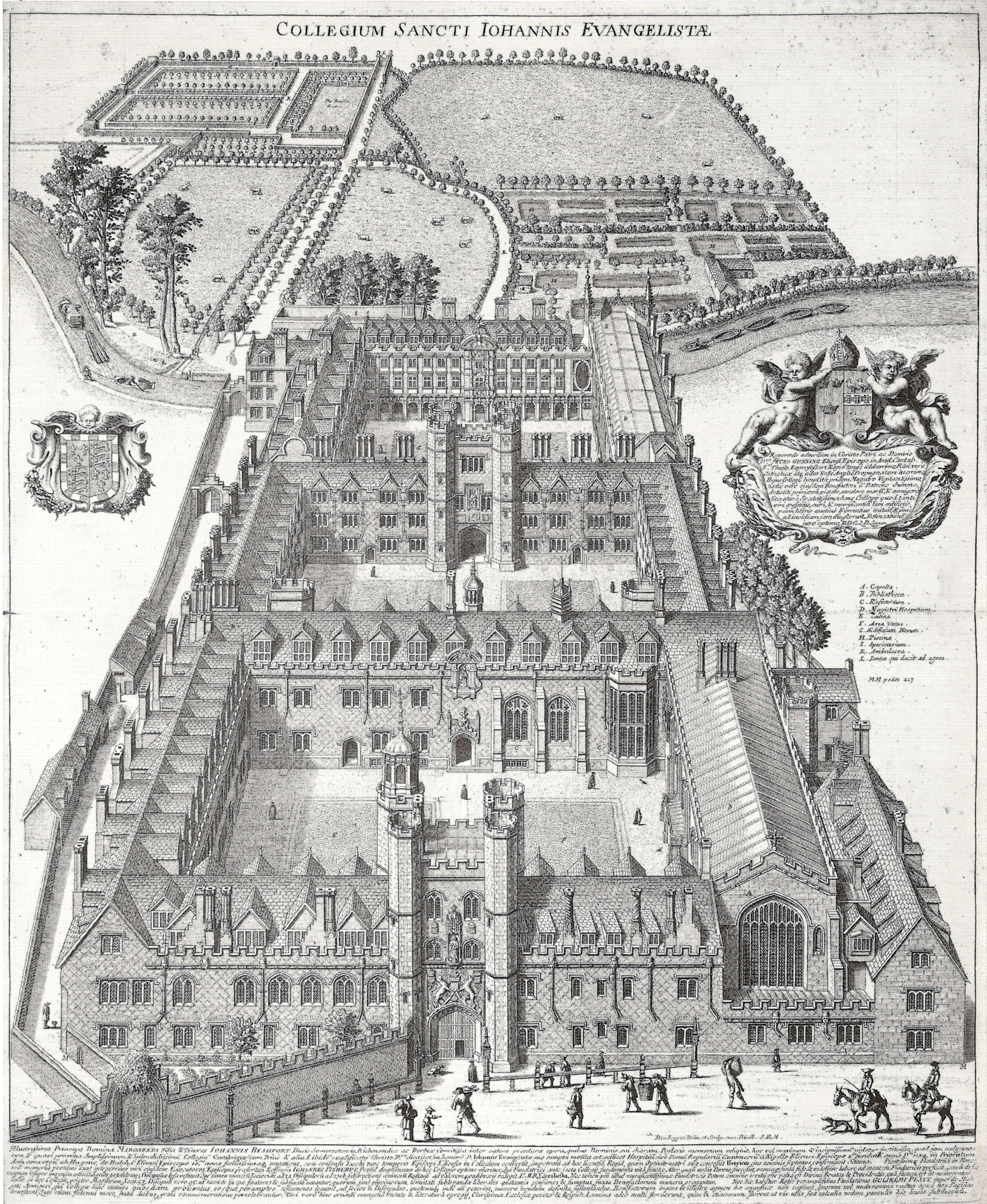
St John's College, Cambridge, by artist David Loggan, c. 1685

Reverend John Yale (c. 1736–1800) was a British cleric and Rector of Lawford in Essex. He was made Steward and Chaplain of Horningsea in the city of Cambridge, and later, became Deacon and Fellow of the University of Cambridge. Notably, he was the heir to the Plas-yn-Yale estate in Wales of the Yale family, which was succeeded by his sister Sarah Yale, last of the direct male line. After her death, her cousin Lt. Col. William Parry Yale succeeded to the estate.

== Early life ==
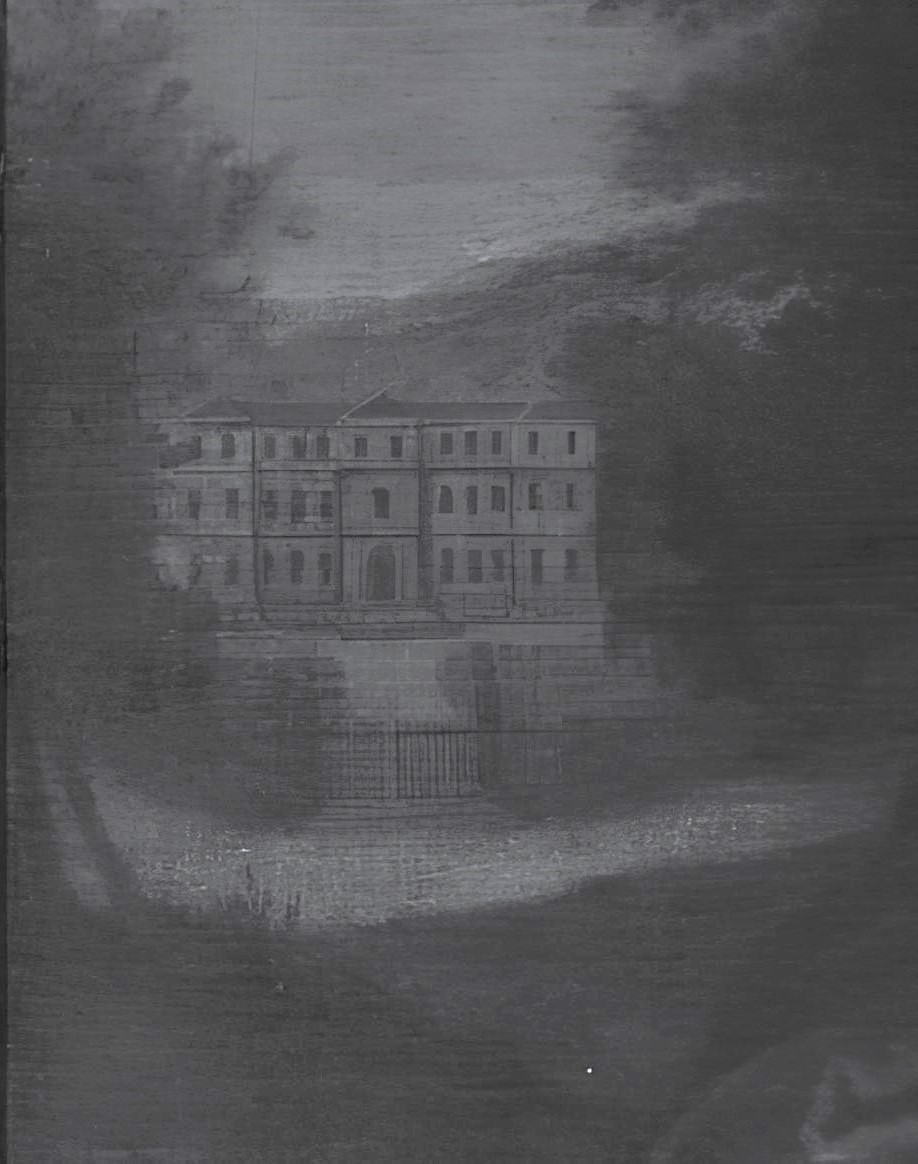
London Manor of Rev. Yale's cousin, Elihu Yale, on Queen Square, probably painted by artist Michael Dahl

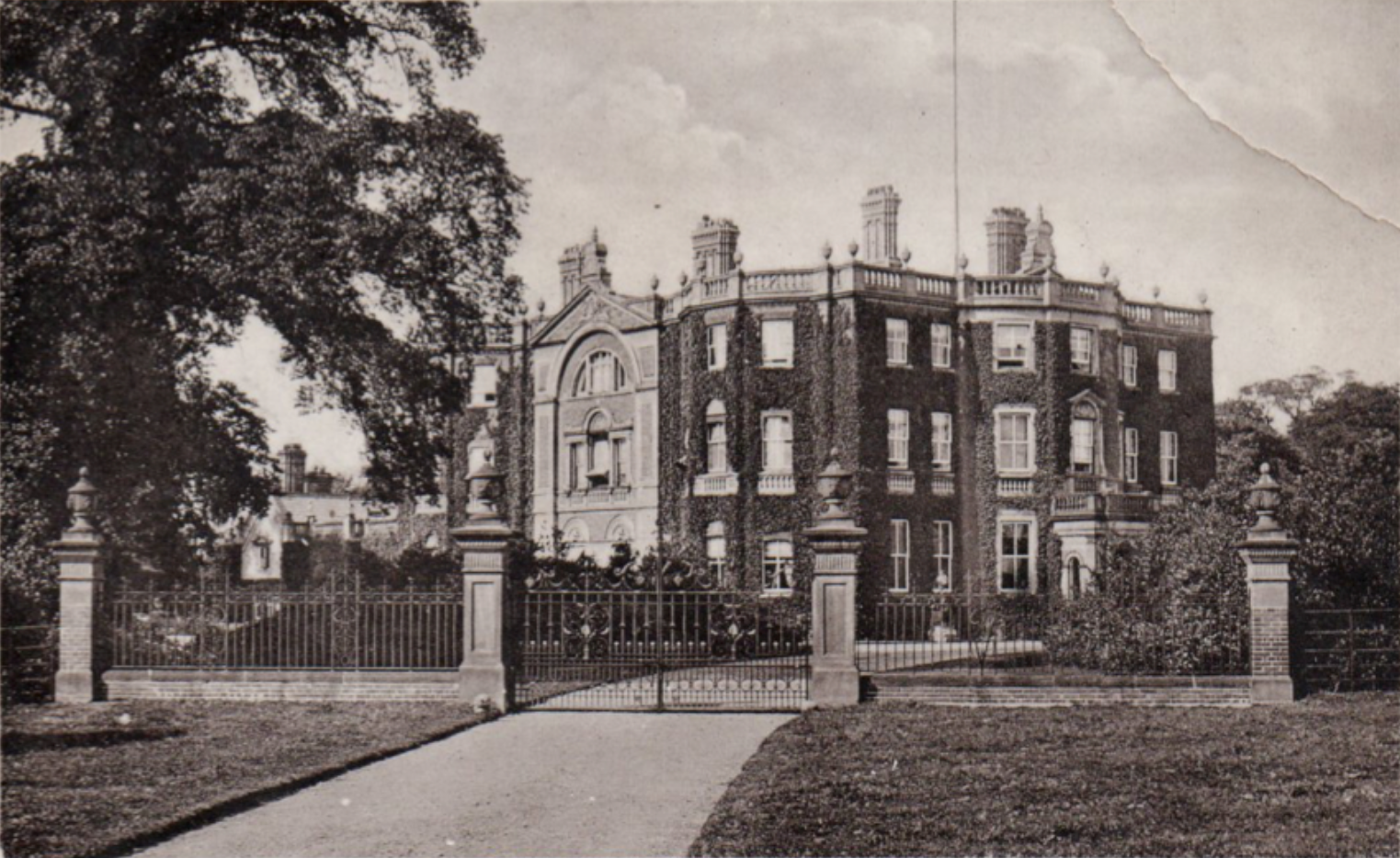
Bostock Hall, property of Rev. Yale's family through Lancelot Bostock, father of Dorethy Bostock

Rev. John Yale was the son of Reverend John Yale Sr. of Plas-yn-Yale, who succeeded in the male line to the Yale family's ancestral estate. Rev. Yale Sr. was the great-grandson of Capt. Thomas Yale, son of Thomas Yale, who married Dorethy Bostock of Bostock Hall. Thomas Yale was the grandson of John Wynn Yale of Plas-yn-Yale, brother of Chancellor David Yale, and a grandnephew of Dr. Thomas Yale (d. 1577), who served his distant cousin, Queen Elizabeth Tudor, as an ambassador and Chancellor to the Archbishop of Canterbury, head of the Church of England.

Capt. Yale (d. 1682), fought as a commanding officer in the army of King Charles I of England, member of the House of Stuart, successors to the Tudors. His father-in-law was Hugh Hughes of Gwerclas, Baron of Cymmer-yn-Edeirnion and High Sheriff of Merioneth, who was from the other cadet branch of the Royal House of Mathrafal, acting as royal co-representatives with the Yales. Through this line came the Plas-yn-Yale estate into Rev. Yale's hand.

== Career ==
Rev. Yale was born in Wrexham, Wales, and bred at Ruthin, Denbighshire. He was admitted pensioner, tutor and surety by Mr. Abbot, on 27 September 1762. He became Rector of Stradishall in Suffolk. It is possible that he was the John Yale that was made Rector of Llandegla in 1760, but more likely, it was his cousin John Yale, a graduate of Jesus College at the University of Oxford.

Between 1762 and 1763, Rev. Yale was admitted to St John's College, at the University of Cambridge. He admitted Robert Eyton, son of merchant Thomas Eyton, to Cambridge University, along with Ambrose Thelwall Lewis. Yale also recommended Mr. Hughes Ruthin and the son of merchant Thomas Williams to the college.

On 7 April 1767 Rev. Yale was appointed a Fellow of St John's College, Cambridge, becoming a member of its governing body after the death of Dr. Ogden. On 29 May 1768 Yale was ordained Deacon by John Green, Bishop of Lincoln Cathedral, and Priest on 11 March 1770. Bishop Greene was the past Chaplain of Charles Seymour, 6th Duke of Somerset of Petworth House, and the past Vice-Chancellor of Cambridge University. In 1770, Yale obtained his Master of Arts from the same institution.

On 15 March 1777 Yale was appointed Chaplain of Horningsea, in the city of Cambridge, in Cambridgeshire, until 1779, after which he was appointed Steward of Horningsea. On 1 July 1777, Rev. Yale obtained his degree of Bachelor of Divinity, along with Rev. John Chevalier, who became Master of St John's College and Vice-Chancellor of Cambridge University, and Rev. Nevil Maskelyne, who became Astronomer Royal, and the first person to measure scientifically the Mass of planet Earth.

On 26 October 1779 he was presented to the rectory of Lawford in Essex by Cambridge University, and was appointed its Rector on 5 November, an office he held until his death. In 1781, he was made once more a Fellow of the college at Cambridge. In 1795, Yale received a game certificate for Denbighshire, along with MP John Wynne Griffith, MP Richard Myddelton of Chirk Castle, also steward of the Lordship of Bromfield and Yale, and Sir Watkin Williams-Wynn of Wynnstay Hall.

== Death ==
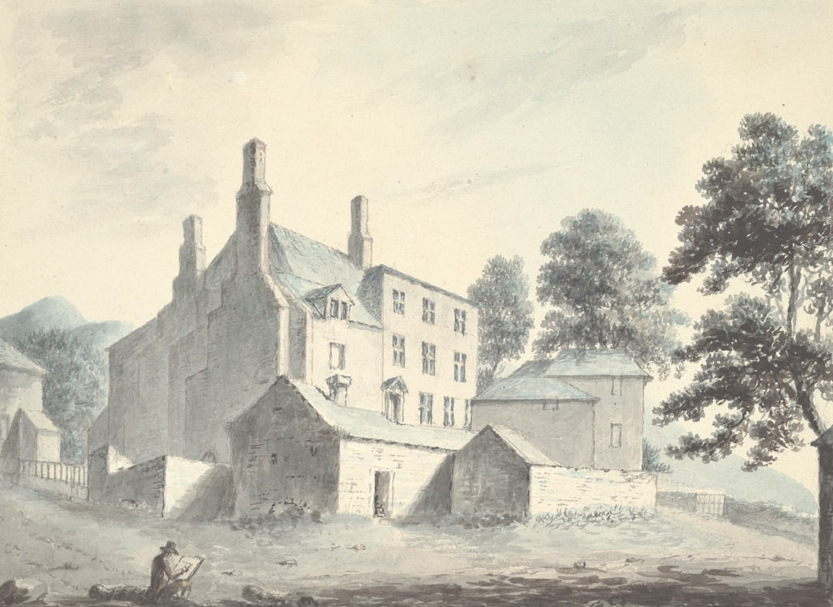
Plas yn Yale, seat of the Yale's, c.1795

Yale died unmarried on 26 April 1800. He was buried at the Yale Chapel in Denbighshire, Wales, erected in 1575 by Chancellor Thomas Yale during the reign of Queen Elizabeth Tudor, whom he was closely associated with. Rev. Yale had been the curate of Bryneglwys from 1760 to 1789. His brother was an apothecary and surgeon on Catherine Street, in the City of Westminster, London. Based on his fellows at Cambridge, his only ambition in life was to be worth £50,000.

Following Rev. Yale's death, proprietor of Plas-yn-Yale, his sister Sarah Yale became the successor to the estate, and the last of the direct male line of this branch of the Yale family.

She died without children, and as a heraldic heiress, had the Plas-yn-Yale estate and coat of arms entailed in her will to her cousin, Lt. Col. William Parry-Jones, brother of Gen. Loves Jones-Parry, making him the new head and heir general of the House of Yale, and exchanged by Royal licence 1867, his name and arms for those of Yale, becoming Lt. Col. William Parry Yale.

Col. Yale's successor was his nephew, Oxford barrister William Corbet Yale of Madryn Castle, father of Col. James Corbet Yale of Widcombe Manor, grandfather of Lt. Col. John Corbet Yale, and great-grandfather of Queen's Counsel David Yale (d. 2021).
