= Love Jones-Parry =

Love Jones-Parry may refer to:

- Love Jones-Parry (British Army officer) (1781–1853), Welsh soldier and MP
- Sir Love Jones-Parry, 1st Baronet (1832–1891), Welsh MP, son of the above
