= William Parry Yale =

Lieutenant Colonel and High Sheriff from Denbighshire, Wales

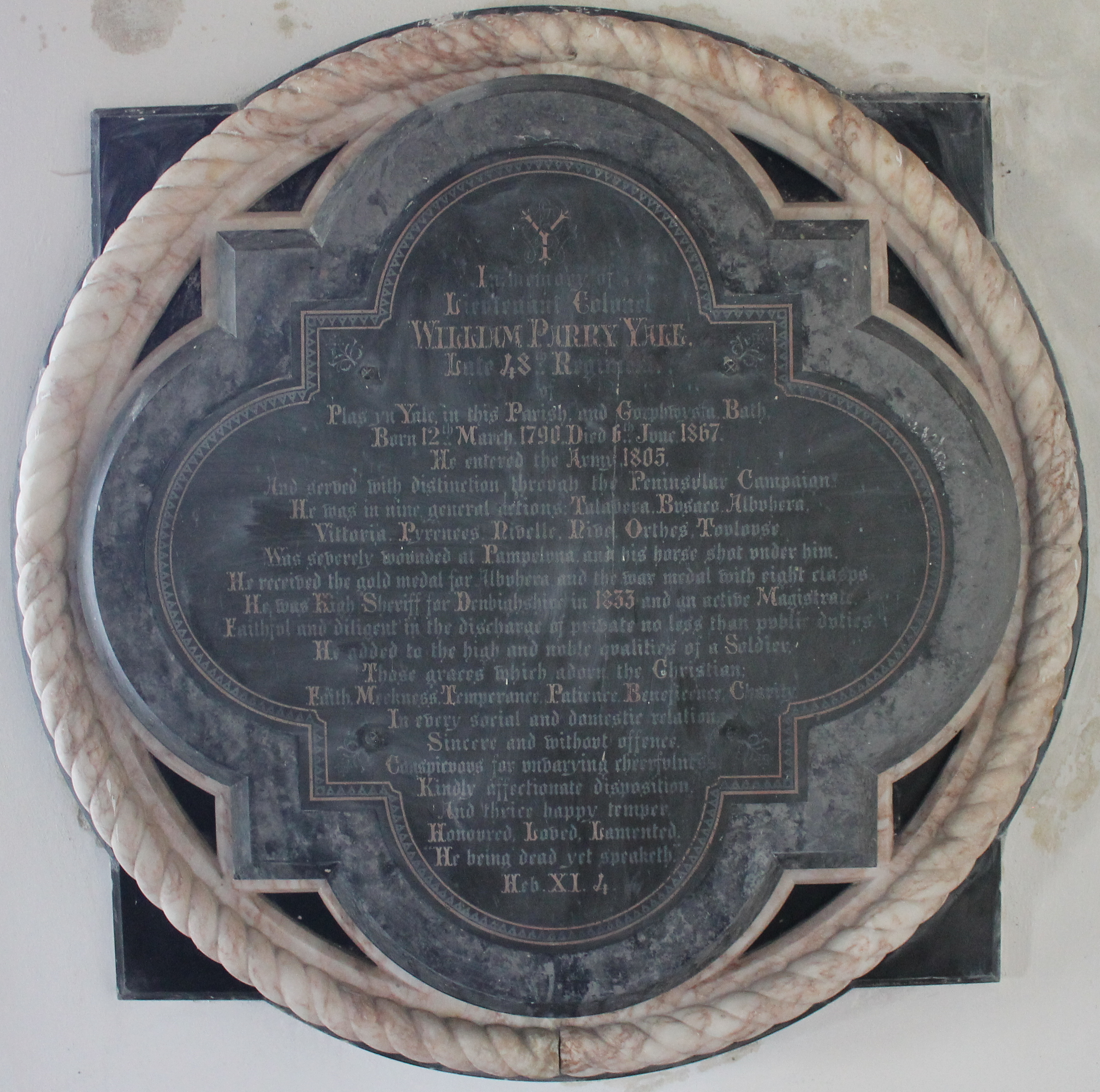
The memorial on Lt. Col. Yale at the "Yale Chapel", built by Dr. Thomas Yale during the Tudor period

Lieutenant Colonel William Parry Yale (1790 – 1867) was a military officer, magistrate and High Sheriff of Denbighshire. He became Justice of the Peace and a veteran of the Peninsular War during the Napoleonic Wars, serving under the Duke of Wellington. He was also severely wounded at the Siege of Pamplona, and was awarded the Peninsular Gold Medal after his campaign.

== Biography ==
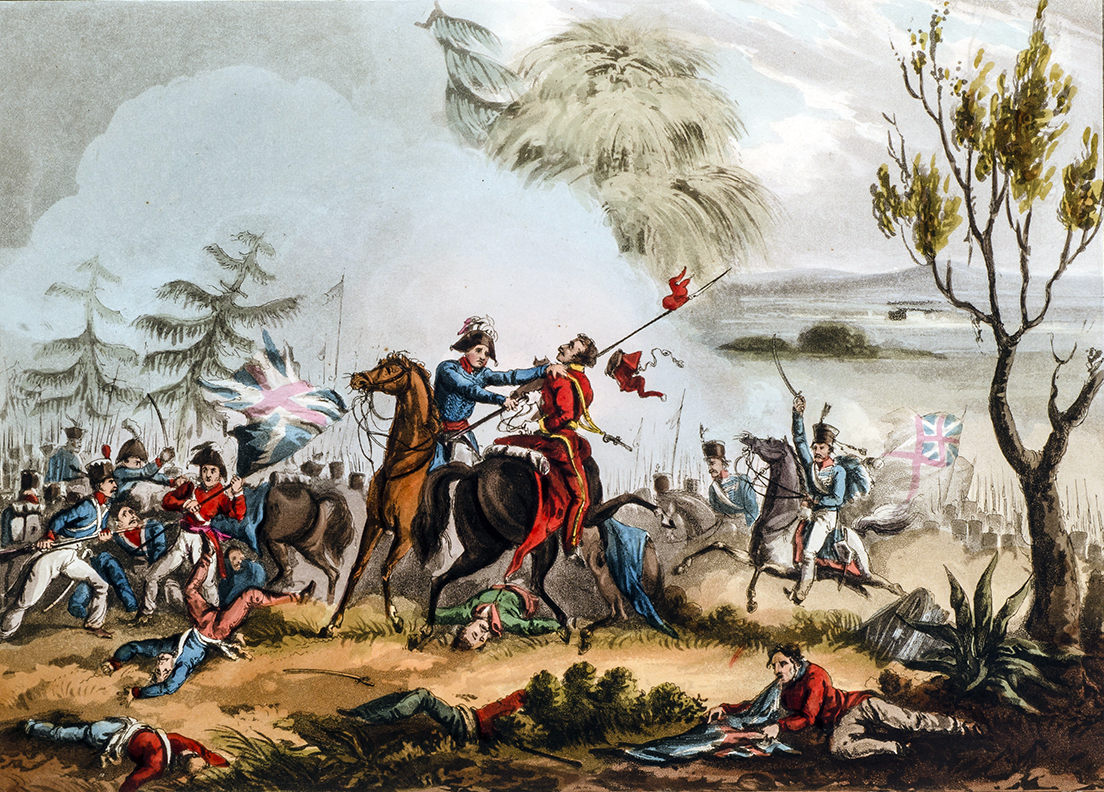
Battle of Albuera during the Napoleonic Wars, where Capt. Yale was in command of the 48th Regiment of Foot

William Parry Yale, née Parry Jones, was born on March 12, 1790, to Thomas Parry Jones of Denbighshire. His father was a captain of the 23rd Royal Welch Fusiliers during the Great Siege of Gibraltar, defending the fortress under Gen. George A. Eliott. He had married his cousin Margaret Parry, co-heiress of Love Parry, esquire, and had his name changed to Parry Jones Parry. Love Parry owned the estates of Madryn Castle, Penarth, Cefn Llanfair and Wernfawr. One of Yale's cousin was Cambridge reverend John Yale of Plas-yn-Yale, who married with the Bostock family of Bostock Hall.

Yale's brother, Lt. Gen. Sir Love Jones-Parry, was an Oxford graduate and member of Parliament, who served during the War of 1812 against America. His other brother, Capt. Thomas Parry Jones-Parry, became Deputy Lieutenant and High Sheriff of Caernarvonshire, while his sister-in-law, Margaret, was the daughter of Vice-Admiral Robert Lloyd. Other brothers-in-law included Lt. Col. Robert Browne Macgregor, of the 88th Regiment of Foot during the Napoleonic Wars, and Major-General William Clapham of Widcombe Manor. Yale's uncle was Col. Gwyllym Lloyd Wardle, member of Parliament and opponent of Prince Frederick, Duke of York.

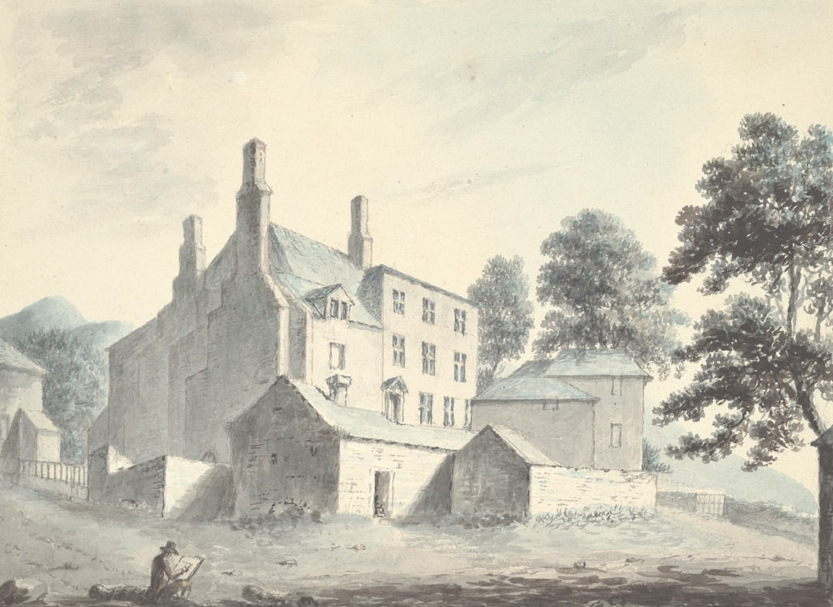
Plas yn Yale, seat of the Yales, c. 1795

Yale was educated at Westminster School, and then attended and graduated from the Royal Military College. He entered the British army in 1805, and became Lieutenant in 1806, Captain in 1808, Major in 1825, and Lieutenant Colonel in 1838. Yale spent most of his military career in the Peninsular War during the Napoleonic Wars, under the Duke of Wellington. He fought as Captain of the 48th Regiment of Foot during the Battle of Albuera, and thereafter, engaged at the Battle of Talavera along with Spain and the Duke of Wellington, facing the army of king Joseph Bonaparte.

Yale then engaged at the Battle of Bussaco, along with the Portuguese army, facing Marshal André Masséna, Prince of Essling. He fought at the Battle of Vitoria and the Battle of the Pyrenees, facing Marshals Jean-Baptiste Jourdan, 1st Count Jourdan, and Jean-de-Dieu Soult, 1st Duke of Dalmatia. Yale was severely wounded at the Siege of Pamplona in 1813, and narrowly escaped death, as his horse was shot under him.

He then engaged at the Battles of Nivelle, Nive and Orthez. His last conflict was the Battle of Toulouse in 1814, which was one of the last battles against Napoleon's army. For his service, he received the Peninsular Gold Medal and the Silver Medal. Following the end of the war, he became a magistrate for Denbighshire and other counties, including Justice of the Peace, and was elected High Sheriff of Denbighshire in 1833.

He served under Lord Lieutenant Robert Myddelton Biddulph, proprietor of Chirk Castle and aide-de-camp to Queen Victoria. Yale inherited the estate of Plas-yn-Yale from his cousin Sarah Yale, sister of Rev. John Yale, through the line of Osborne Fitzgerald, member of the Fitzgerald dynasty, and changed his name to William Parry Yale in agreement with the will. Lt. Col. Yale and Sarah Yale were both members of the Yale family.

William Parry Yale died on June 6, 1867, in Bath, England, aged 77 years old. Yale was married to Eliza Flora, daughter of J. Saunderson, by whom he had no surviving children. Following his death, his nephew, Deputy Lieutenant William Corbet Yale, inherited his estates.
