= Bryneglwys =

Village in Denbighshire, Wales

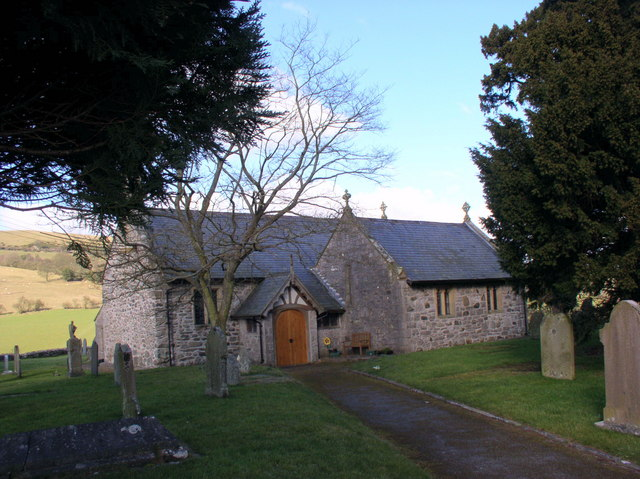
- St. Tysilio's Church

- Location within Denbighshire
- Area: 9.45 sq mi (24.5 km^{2})
- Population: 369 (2011)
  - Density: 39/sq mi (15/km^{2})
- OS grid reference: SJ145472
- Community: Bryneglwys
- Principal area: Denbighshire
- Country: Wales
- Sovereign state: United Kingdom
- Post town: CORWEN
- Postcode district: LL21
- Dialling code: 01490
- Police: North Wales
- Fire: North Wales
- Ambulance: Welsh
- UK Parliament: Clwyd East
- Senedd Cymru – Welsh Parliament: Clwyd West
- List of places UK Wales Denbighshire 53°00′54″N 3°16′26″W Map of the community

Bryneglwys is a village and community in Denbighshire, Wales. The village lies to the northeast of Corwen on a hill above a small river, Afon Morwynion, and is situated in the ancient commote of Iâl (Yale). The community covers an area of 9.45 square miles (24.5 km^{2}) and extends to the top of Llantysilio Mountain. It had a population of 369 at the time of the 2011 census, an increase from 344 during the 2001 census.

The 2011 census showed 36.0% of the population could speak Welsh, a fall from 50.3% in 2001. The name of the village means "church hill" in English and was first recorded in 1284 with the spelling "Breneglus".

The village church is dedicated to Saint Tysilio, a Welsh Prince and Bishop, son Brochwel Ysgithrog, a King of Powys of the House of Gwertherion. There has been a church on the site since the early 7th century, but the current building dates from the 15th century and was restored around 1570 and again in 1875.

The nearest primary school is Ysgol Dyffryn Iâl in the village of Llandegla. It is a bilingual school under the control of the Church in Wales.

The 16th-century historian David Powel came from the village.

== Yale Chapel ==
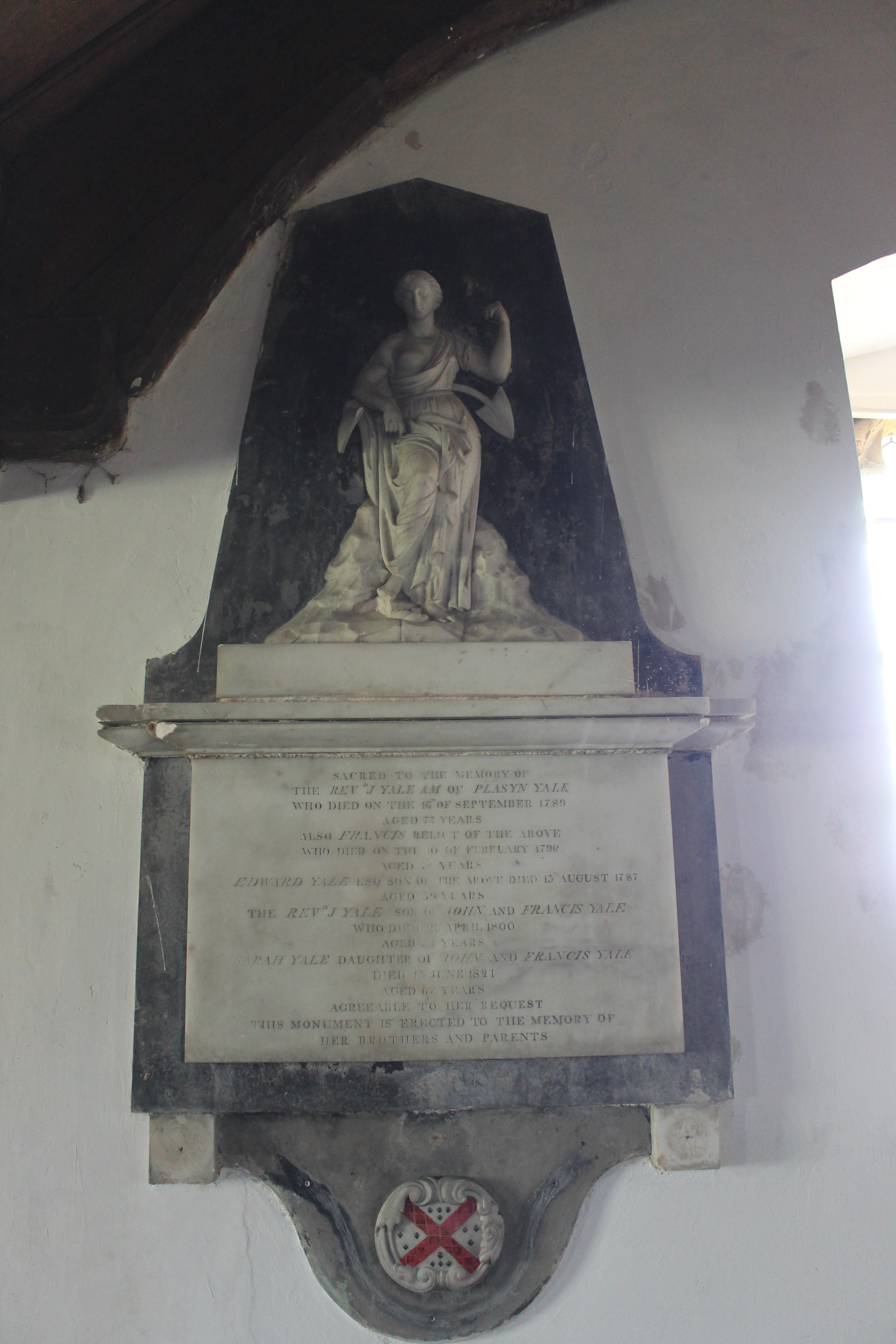
Memorial plate to Rev. J. Yale of Plas yn Yale, featuring the coat of arms

The Yale Chapel was added to the church around 1575, during the reign of Queen Elizabeth Tudor, by Chancellor Thomas Yale, part of her "privy counsel" and member of the Yale family. His grandfather, Baron Ellis ap Griffith, founded the House of Yale. The Yales were cousins of the Tudors, dating back to the Welsh Revolt and the Tudors of Penmynydd.

The Yale Chapel overlies the Yale family burial vault and is less than five miles away from the ancestral religious center of the Lordship of Yale, Valle Crucis Abbey, of which Bryneglwys village historically belonged to before dissolution. The abbey was founded by the Prince of Powys Fadog, Madog ap Gruffydd Maelor, Lord of Yale and Dinas Bran.

It features Gothic memorials to a number of Yale family members such as Lt. Col. William Parry Yale (died 1867), brother of Lt. Gen. Sir Love Jones-Parry, Eliza Yale (1882), Dep. Lt. William Corbet Yale (died 1909), and others.

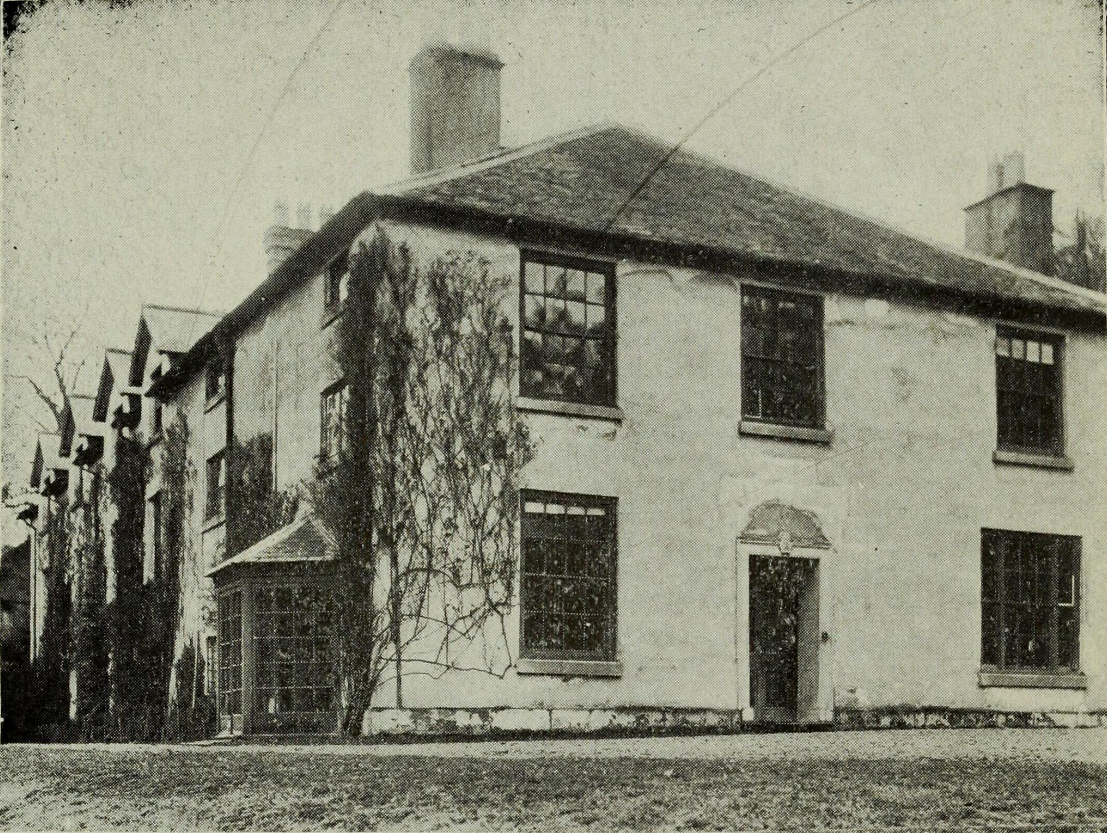
The present structure at Plas yn Iâl, the ancestral home was demolished

To the northeast of the village stands Plas yn Iâl, the ancestral home of the Yale family which included Gov. Elihu Yale, benefactor of Yale University in the USA.

He is buried in nearby Wrexham, at St Giles' Church, of which Yale University made a monumental Tower to replicate his burial site at Saybrook College on Yale's campus.

Another family member, Chancellor David Yale, of Erddig Park, is buried at Chester Cathedral, in the city of Chester. He was the son-in-law of Admiralty judge John Lloyd, and the father of Thomas Yale.

Thomas's widow, Ann Lloyd, daughter of Bishop George Lloyd, was the mother of the Yales of emigrated to America with their stepfather, Gov. Theophilus Eaton.

== Gallery ==
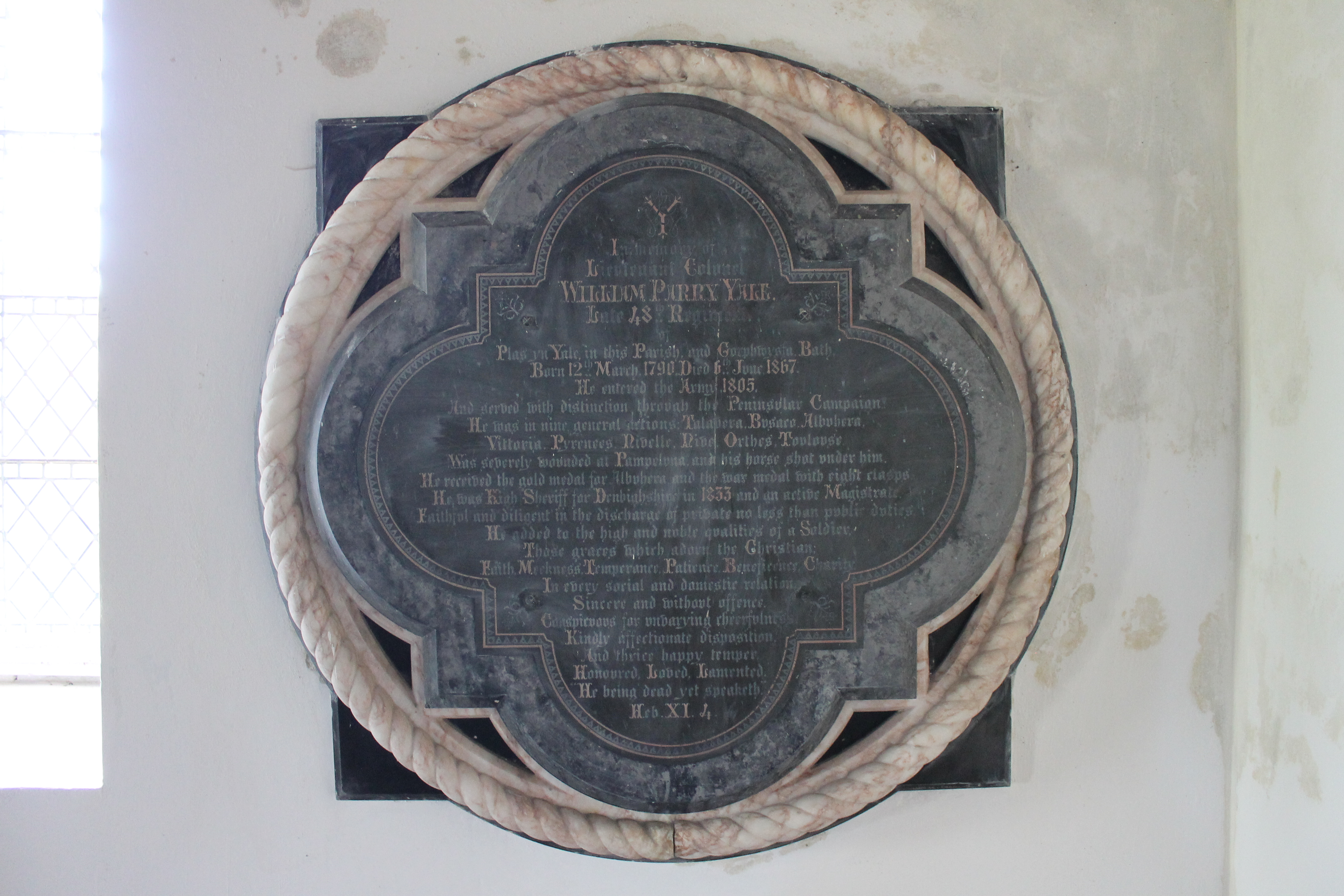

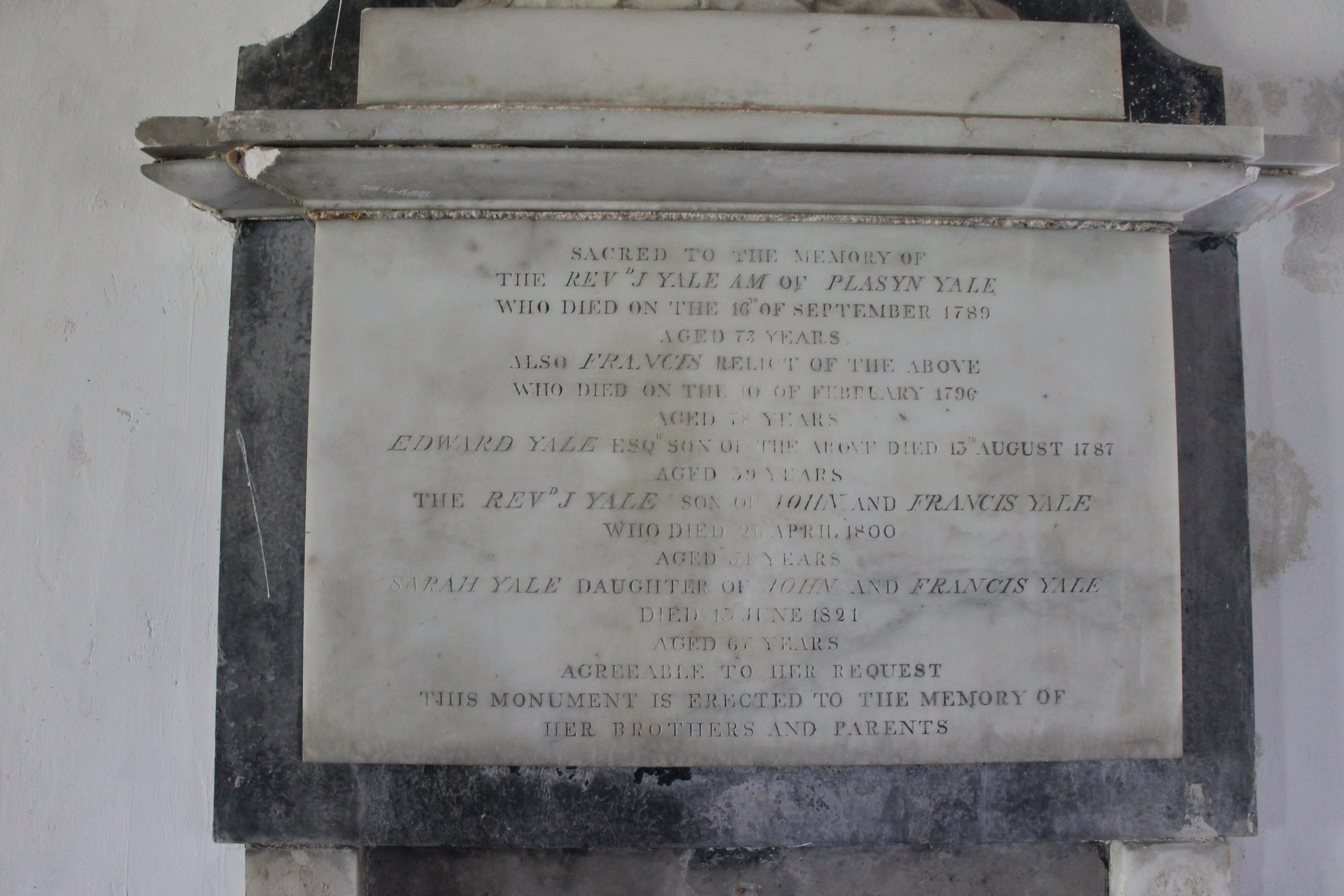

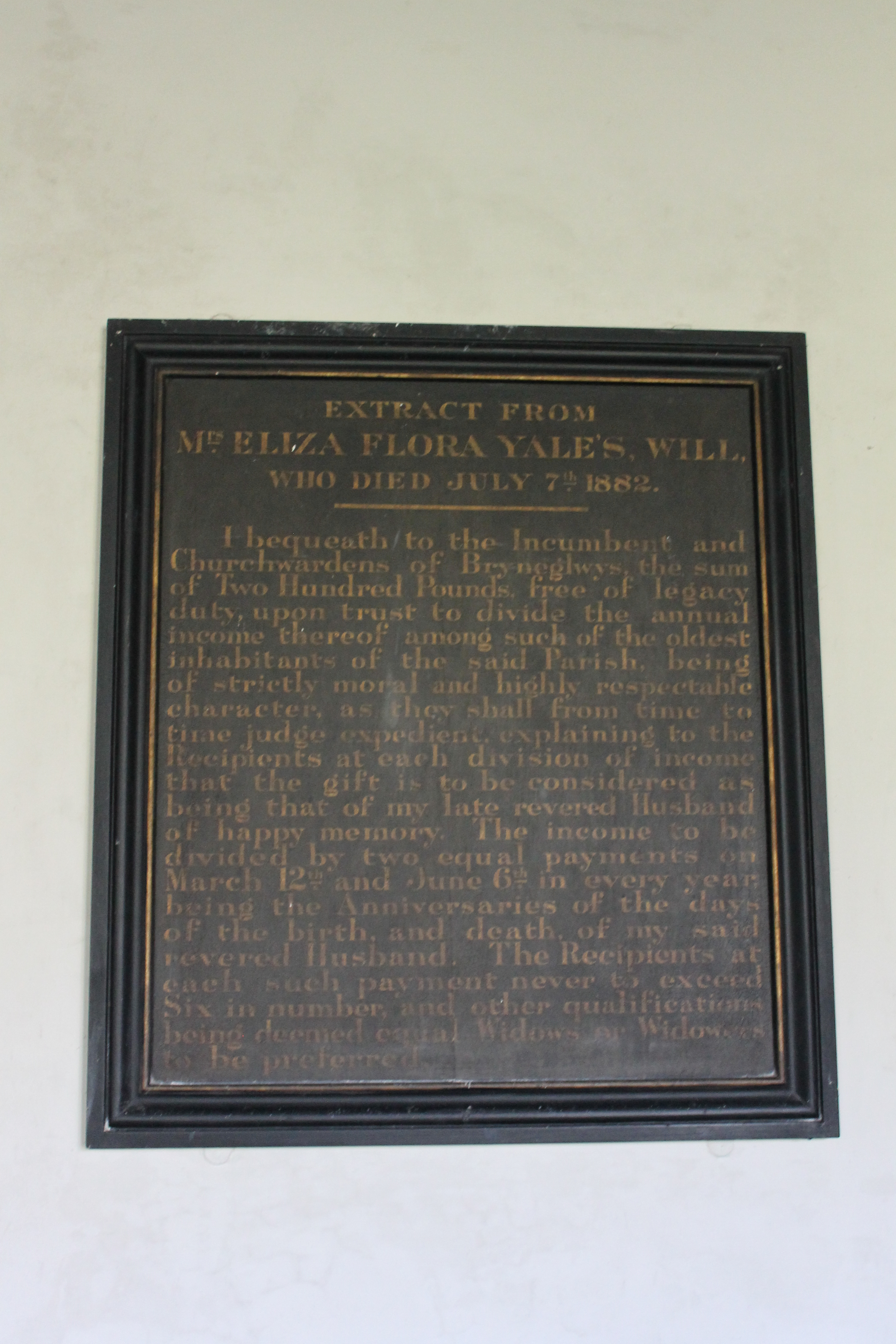

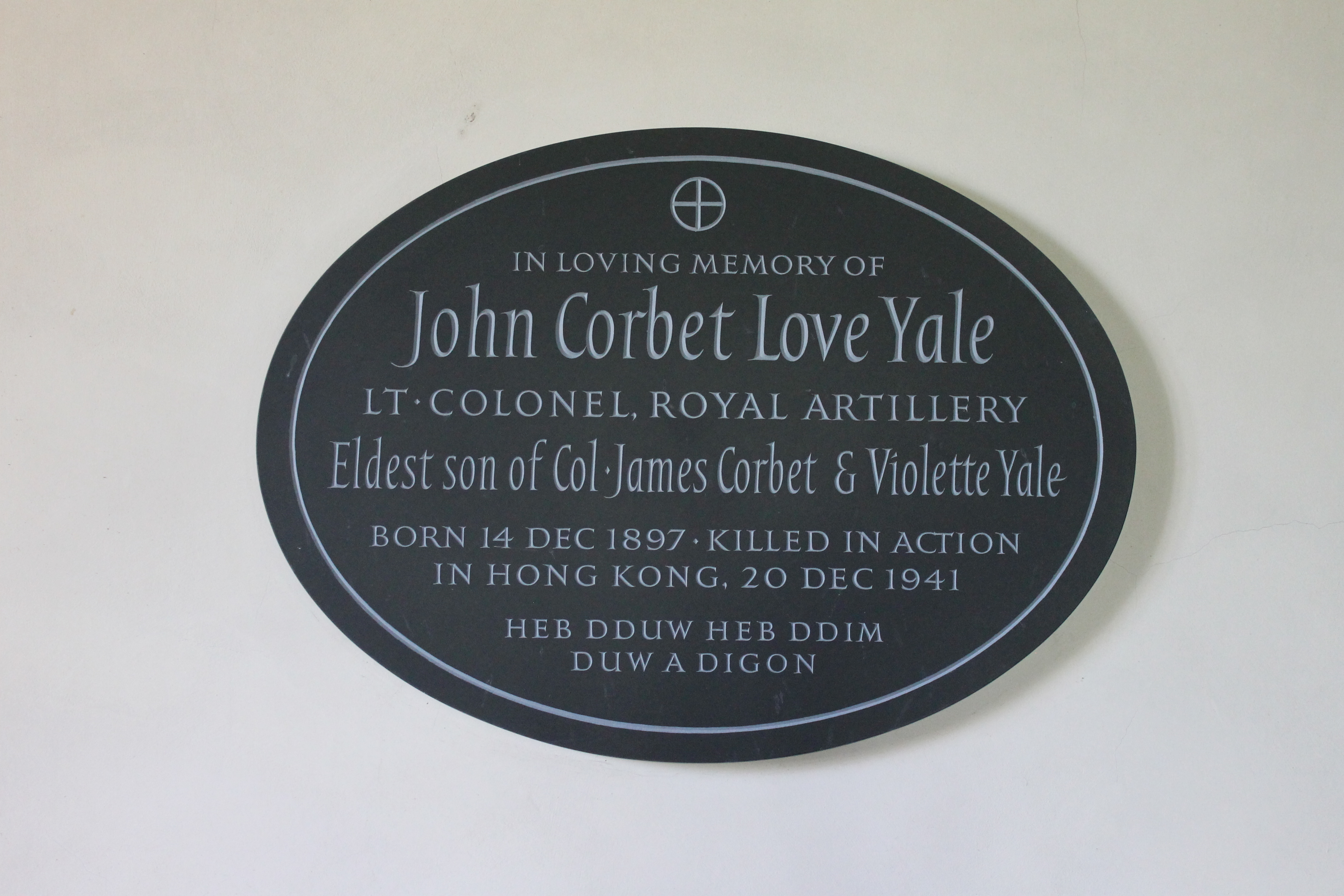
