= John Yale =

John Yale may refer to:

- John B. Yale (1845–1904), American telegraph and railroad entrepreneur
- John Yale (aviation artist) (1925–1998), Canadian British artist and painter
- John Yale (cleric) (c. 1736–1800), British cleric and rector
- John R. Yale (1855–1925), American businessman and politician
- John Wesley Yale (1832–1900), American paper merchant and military officer
