= Sir Love Jones-Parry, 1st Baronet =

British landowner and politician

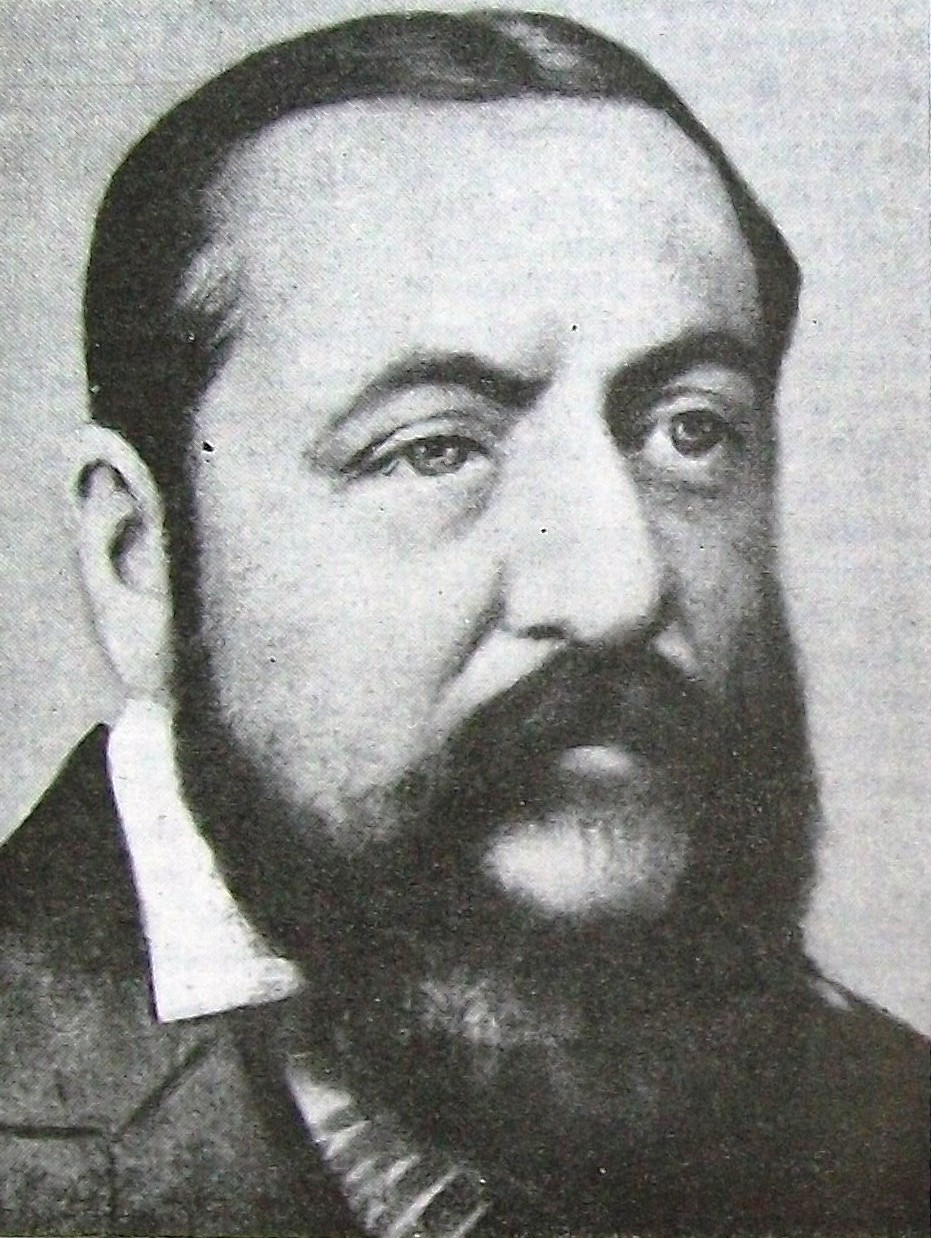
Sir Love Jones-Parry

Sir Thomas Duncombe Love Jones-Parry, 1st Baronet (5 January 1832 – 18 December 1891) was a Welsh landowner and Liberal politician. He was one of the founders of the Y Wladfa settlement in Patagonia, South America.

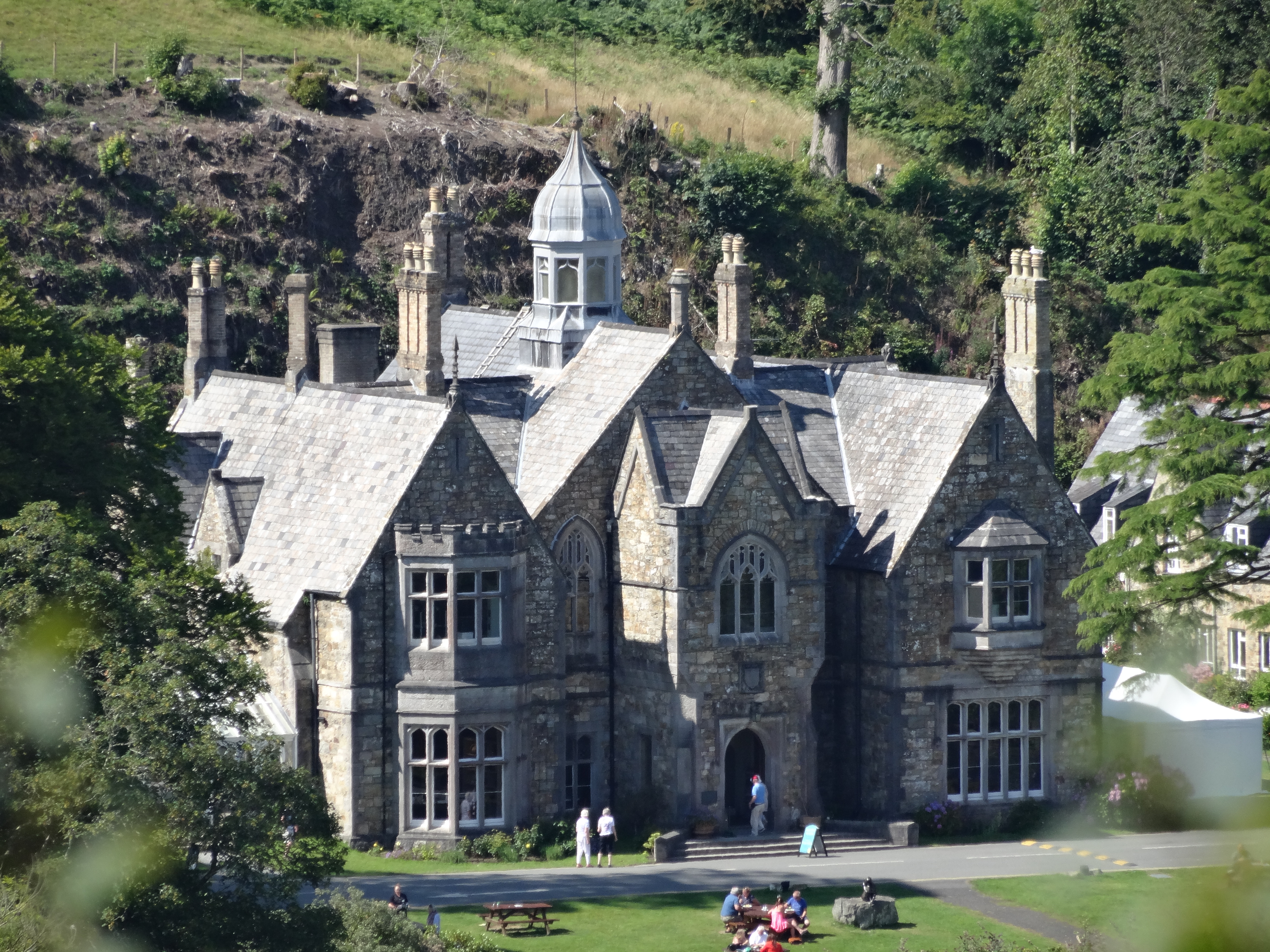
Plas Glyn y Weddw, Llanbedrog, built by Lady Elizabeth Love Jones-Parry c. 1857, later sold to Solomon Andrews

Love Jones-Parry inherited Madryn Castle and its estate from his father, Gen. Sir Love Jones-Parry. He owned about 7,222 acres of land in Wales. He was educated at Rugby School and Christ Church, Oxford, later becoming a high sheriff in 1854. He was a prominent figure in eisteddfodic circles, where he had the bardic name "Elphin". His uncle was Col. William Parry Yale, born Jones-Parry, heir of Plas-yn-Yale, and his cousin was Dept. Lt. William Corbet Yale.

Jones-Parry rose to prominence in politics when he won the Caernarvonshire seat in the 1868 election, defeating the Tory candidate, George Douglas-Pennant (later Lord Penrhyn). The five year old David Lloyd George carried the Liberal banner at the head of the victory parade in Llanystumdwy.

He lost this seat at the next election, but won the Caernarvon Boroughs seat at a by-election in 1882 and held it until 1886. He was made a baronet by Gladstone for his services to the Liberal Party, on 30 August 1886.

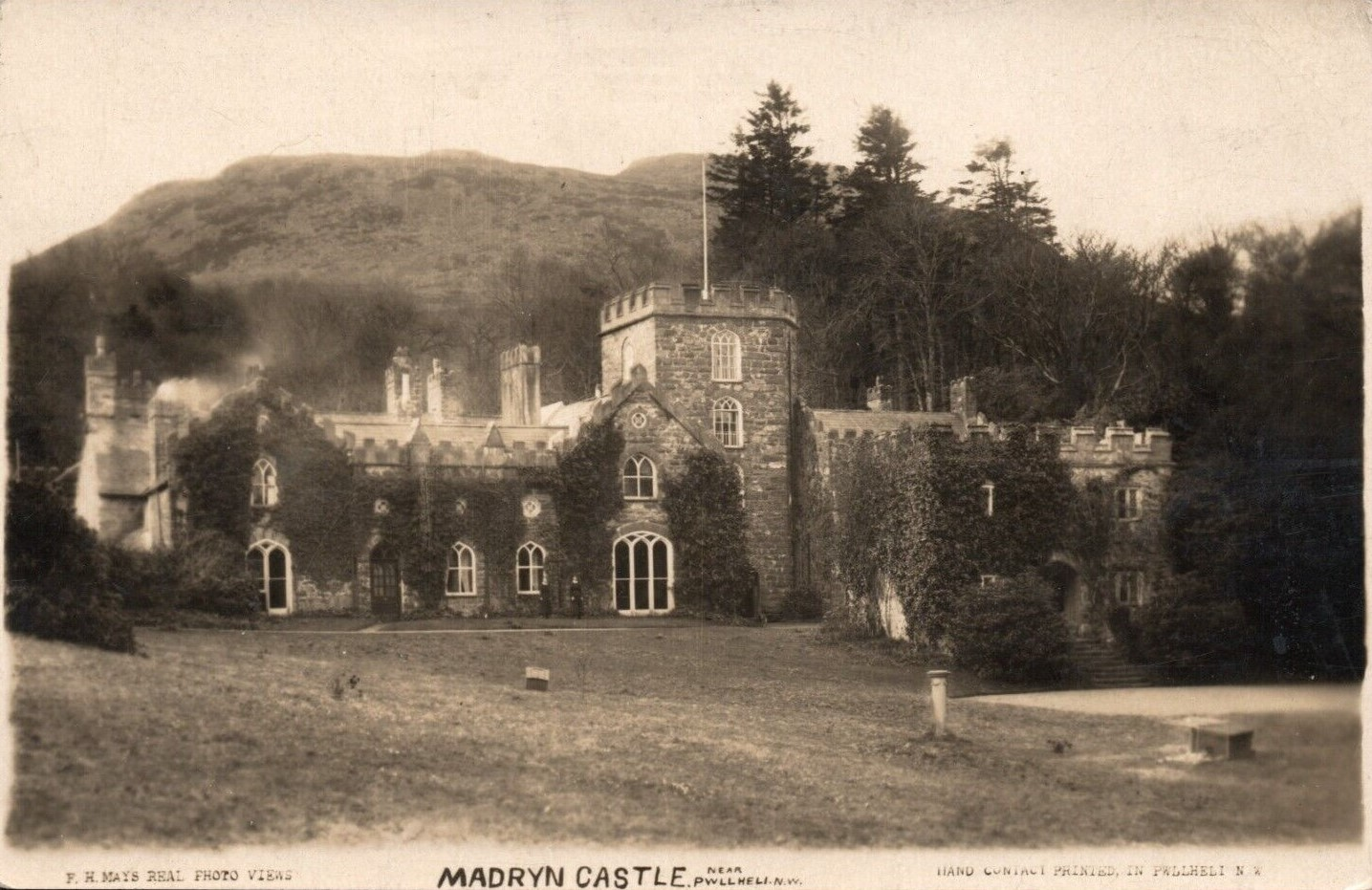
Seat of Sir Love-Jones, Madryn Castle, Wales

Towards the end of 1862 Captain Love Jones-Parry, accompanied by Lewis Jones, left for Patagonia to decide whether it was a suitable area for Welsh emigrants. The trip was largely financed by Jones-Parry, who paid at least £750 from his own pocket. They first visited Buenos Aires where they held discussions with the Interior Minister Guillermo Rawson then, having come to an agreement, they headed south.

They reached Patagonia in a small ship named the Candelaria, and were driven by a storm into a bay which they named "Porth Madryn" after Jones-Parry's estate in Wales. The town which grew near the spot where they landed is now named Puerto Madryn .

Following a favourable report from Jones-Parry and Lewis Jones, a group of 162 Welsh emigrants departed for Patagonia in the ship Mimosa in 1865. Later there was criticism that the report had given too favourable an impression of the area, though the criticism was directed at Lewis Jones rather than Love Jones-Parry.

Sir Love-Jones-Parry's mother, Lady Elizabeth, built the gothic Plas Glyn-y-Weddw manor house in Llanbedrog 1857, now the oldest art gallery in Wales.

Parliament of the United Kingdom
Preceded by Hon. George Douglas-Pennant	Member of Parliament for Carnarvonshire; 1868–1874	Succeeded by Hon. George Douglas-Pennant
Preceded by William Bulkeley Hughes	Member of Parliament for Carnarvon Boroughs; 1882–1886	Succeeded by Edmund Swetenham
Baronetage of the United Kingdom
New creation	Baronet (of Madryn Castle); 1886–1891	Extinct
Preceded by Kitson baronets	Jones-Parry baronets of Madryn Castle; 30 August 1886	Succeeded by Clark baronets
