= William Corbet Yale =

Deputy Lieutenant from Denbighshire, Wales

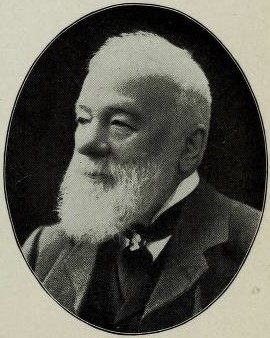
Portrait of Deputy Lieutenant William Corbet Yale

William Corbet Yale-Jones-Parry (1825 – 1909) was a barrister-at-law, magistrate and Justice of the Peace from Denbighshire, Wales. He graduated from Oxford and served as Deputy Lieutenant under Lord Lieutenant William Cornwallis-West, a family member of Prince Hans Heinrich XV von Hochberg. His family seats were at Plas-yn-Yale, Madryn Castle and Widcombe Manor House in the city of Bath, England.

== Biography ==
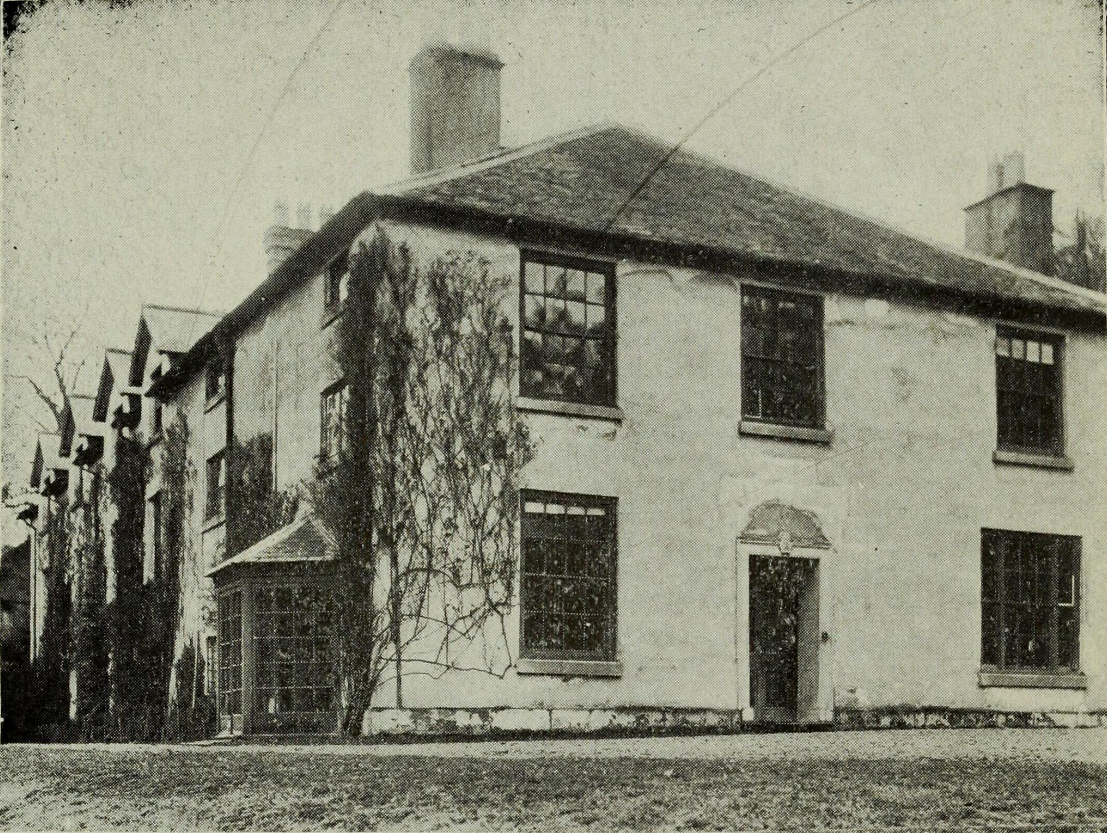
Plas yn Yale (Plas yn Ial), Wales, the modern structure, the ancestral manor was demolished

William Corbet Yale-Jones-Parry, née Jones Parry, was born on April 23, 1825, to Rev. John Parry Jones Parry and Margaret McIver, daughter of Rev. William McIver. He was a member of the Yale family of Yale University, one of the most ancient families in Wales. His uncles were Lt. Col. William Parry Yale and Lt. Gen. Sir Love Jones-Parry. His cousin was Baronet Sir Love Jones-Parry of Glyn y Weddw Manor.

He inherited the Plas-yn-Yale estate from his uncle, which came from the line of Rev. John Yale, all the way to John Wynn Yale, father of Chancellor David Yale, and brother of Chancellor Thomas Yale. His father was rector of Edern, Gwynedd. His Corbet middle name came from his great-great-grandmother, Rachel Corbet, member of the House of Corbet.

Yale was educated at King Edward VI College in Stourbridge, England, and went thereafter to Worcester College, Oxford, where he graduated. He studied a Lincoln's Inn in 1846, went to the Inner Temple, and was called to the bar in 1851.

Yale became Deputy Lieutenant and Justice of the Peace for the county of Denbighshire, and Justice of the Peace for the counties of Merioneth and Caernarfonshire. He served as Deputy Lieutenant and Justice of the Peace under Lord Lieutenant William Cornwallis-West of Newlands Manor, who was the grandnephew of the General Cornwallis who fought in the American War of Independence.

Lord Lt. Cornwallis was also the father-in-law of Prince Hans Heinrich XV von Hochberg of Książ Castle, of Lady Randolph Churchill of Blenheim Palace, mother of Winston Churchill, and of Hugh Grosvenor, 2nd Duke of Westminster of Eaton Hall, who was among the wealthiest individuals in the world at the time.

Yale stayed as a barrister, magistrate and Deputy Lieutenant for over 40 years. He attended the session of Merionethshire in North Wales for the election of the county treasurer and new magistrates, chaired by George Vane-Tempest, 5th Marquess of Londonderry. He was accompanied by Sir Watkin Williams-Wynn of Wynnstay Hall, Lord Herbert Vane-Tempest of Wynyard Hall, Sir Osmond Williams of Castell Deudraeth, and others.

== Later life ==
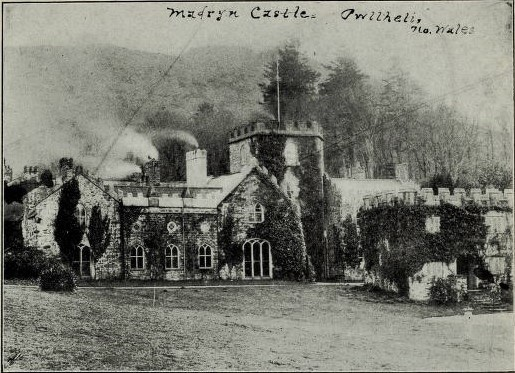
Madryn Castle, seat of Deputy Lt. Yale

In 1869, he attended the sessions in Llangollen in relation to its college, with Lt. Col. Charles George Tottenham and MP George Hammond Whalley. In the same year, he attended the Welsh Liberal Banquet in London, with MP Henry Hanbury-Tracy of Toddington Manor, Sir John Walsham, 2nd Baronet of Knill Court, MP Morgan Lloyd, and a few others.

Yale was married to Isabella Clow, daughter of Rev. James Clow of the East India Company. They had several children, the older of which was Oxford lawyer John Edward Ivor Yale, who married a member of William Debonaire Haggard's family, the Haggards, who were admirals and bankers in the City of London. Another son, James Corbet Yale, succeeded to the Plas-yn-Yale estate and became a Colonel, while George Frederick Cunningham Yale married to Eleanor Lewis, a daughter of Sir Henry Lewis of Belmont, and granddaughter of minister Roger Edwards and MP Thomas Lewis.

He assumed the name of Yale on succeeding to the Plas-yn-Yale estate, and added the names of Jones-Parry when he succeeded to the Madryn Castle estates. The Yales descended from Brochwel Ysgithrog, prince of Powys, who started his reign around 540. Yale also inherited Widcombe Manor House from his cousin Sir Love Jones-Parry in the city of Bath, England, which would be transmitted to his son, Col. James Corbet Yale. He was also one of the shareholders of the Welsh National Newspaper Company, along with UK Prime Minister David Lloyd George, 1st Earl Lloyd-George of Dwyfor, and others.

William Corbet Yale died on February 6, 1909, aged 83 years old, in Rhyl, Wales, and left 3 manors and an estate of about 80,000 pounds, or about 100 million dollars in 2024 money in relation to GDP. Madryn Castle was sold at auction after his death, along with its art collection, which included paintings by Anthony van Dyck, John Hoppner, Hans Holbein and Thomas Gainsborough, with some acquired by the Royal Collection at Windsor Castle. His son, Col. James Corbet Yale, became the grandfather of Cambridge scholar David Yale, who taught at Yale Law School in the United States. Another son, Thomas Parry Osborne Yale, went to Marlborough College, and became a magistrate for Denbighshire, Merionethshire and Caernarfonshire.
