= Carn Fadryn =

Iron Age hillfort in Wales

Coordinates: 52.88571°N 4.56077°W

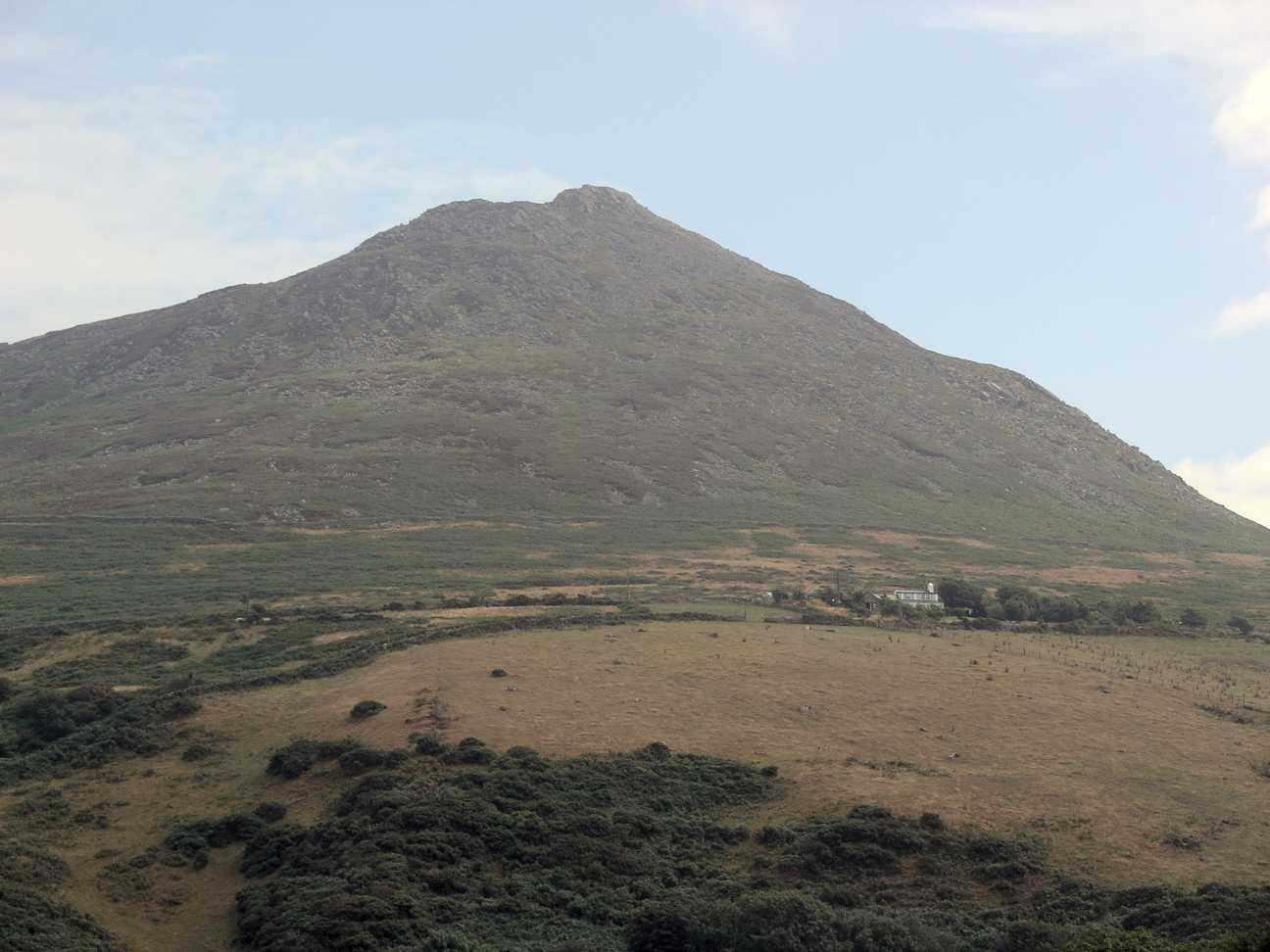
- Garn Fadryn from the south

Highest point
- Elevation: 371 m (1,217 ft)
- Prominence: 343 m (1,125 ft)
- Parent peak: Yr Eifl
- Listing: Marilyn

Geography
- Location within Wales
- Location: Llŷn Peninsula, Wales
- OS grid: SH278351

Carn Fadryn, sometimes Carn Fadrun or Garn Fadryn, is a five-hectare Iron Age hillfort and is the name of the mountain on which the fort is situated. It lies in the centre of the Llŷn Peninsula, Gwynedd, and overlooks the village of Garnfadryn, Wales.

There seems to be two phases of ancient hillfort building on Carn Fadryn, followed by a medieval fortification of the summit. The first period of fortification at Garn Fadryn dates from about 300 BC, when the summit and an area of some 12 acres (49,000 m^{2}) were enclosed.

These were re-fortified during a second period and a wider area towards the north of a total of about 26 acres (110,000 m^{2}) was enclosed. This second period of reinforcement dates from about 100 BC.

The third fort which strengthens the natural crag near the summit is thought to be "the castle of the sons of Owain", mentioned in 1188 as being newly built. (Giraldi Cambrensis Opera (Rolls series, 1868), VI, p123 'dua castra lapidea de nova sita fuerunt; unum...Deutrait; alterum...in capite Lhein, quod erat filium Oenei, cui nomen Karnmadrun.')

The medieval castle was built on the highest part of the summit, and was one of the earliest Welsh castles, symbolising power following the death of Prince Owain Gwynedd and the division of his land between his sons.

On a clear day, the view from Garn Fadryn takes in Anglesey, Snowdonia, most of Cardigan Bay and even the Wicklow Mountains in Ireland.

== See also ==
- List of hillforts in Wales
