= Madryn Castle =

Demolished castle in Wales

Coordinates: 52.8955°N 4.5507°W

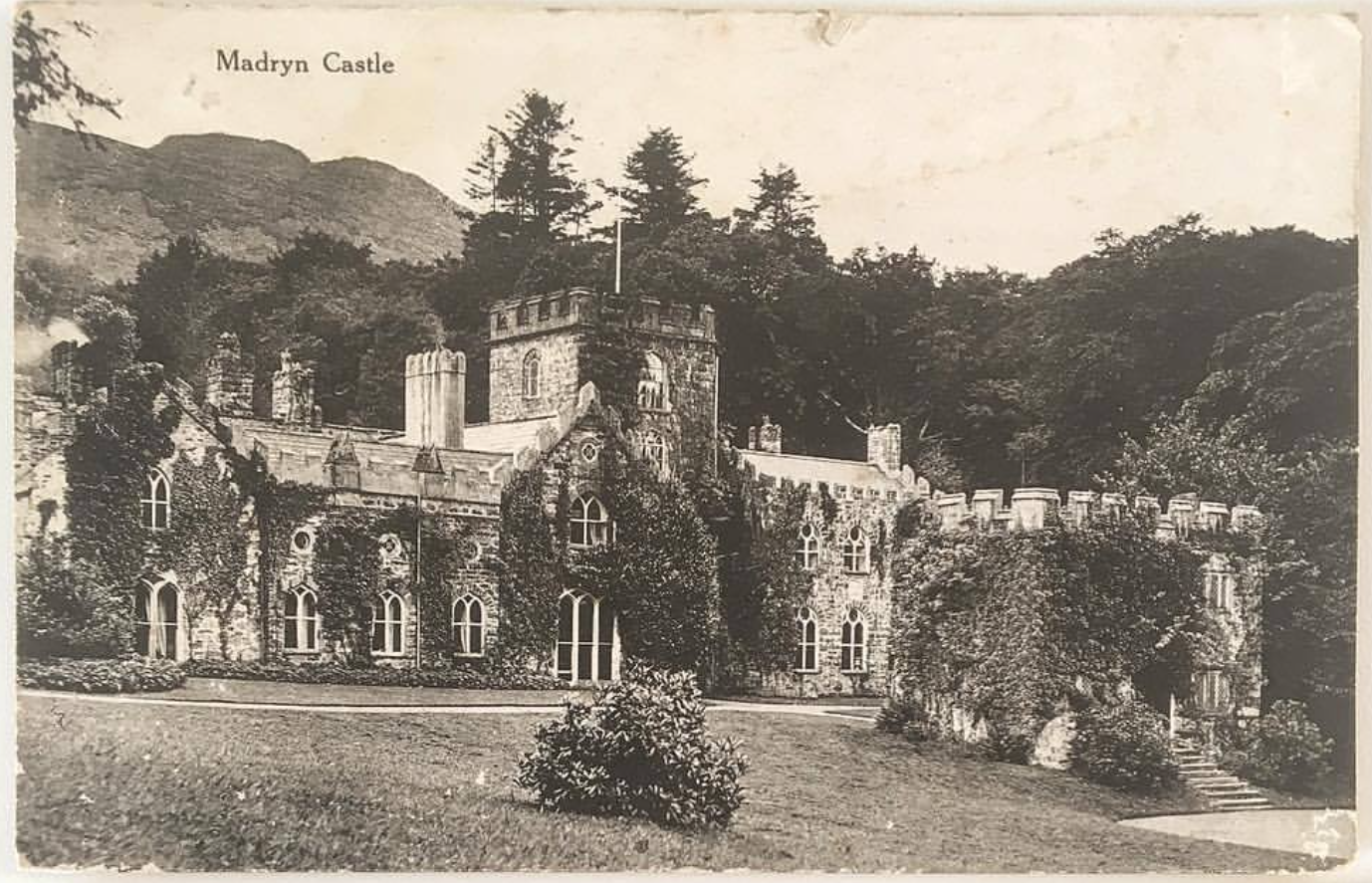
Madryn Castle Postcard around 1911, Wales, was later demolished in the 1960s

Madryn Castle (Welsh: Castell Madryn) was a Welsh Gothic castle located south of the Llŷn Peninsula and north of Carn Fadryn in Buan, in the county of Gwynedd. It was owned by the same family for about 200 years until the death of Deputy Lieutenant William Corbet Yale in 1909.

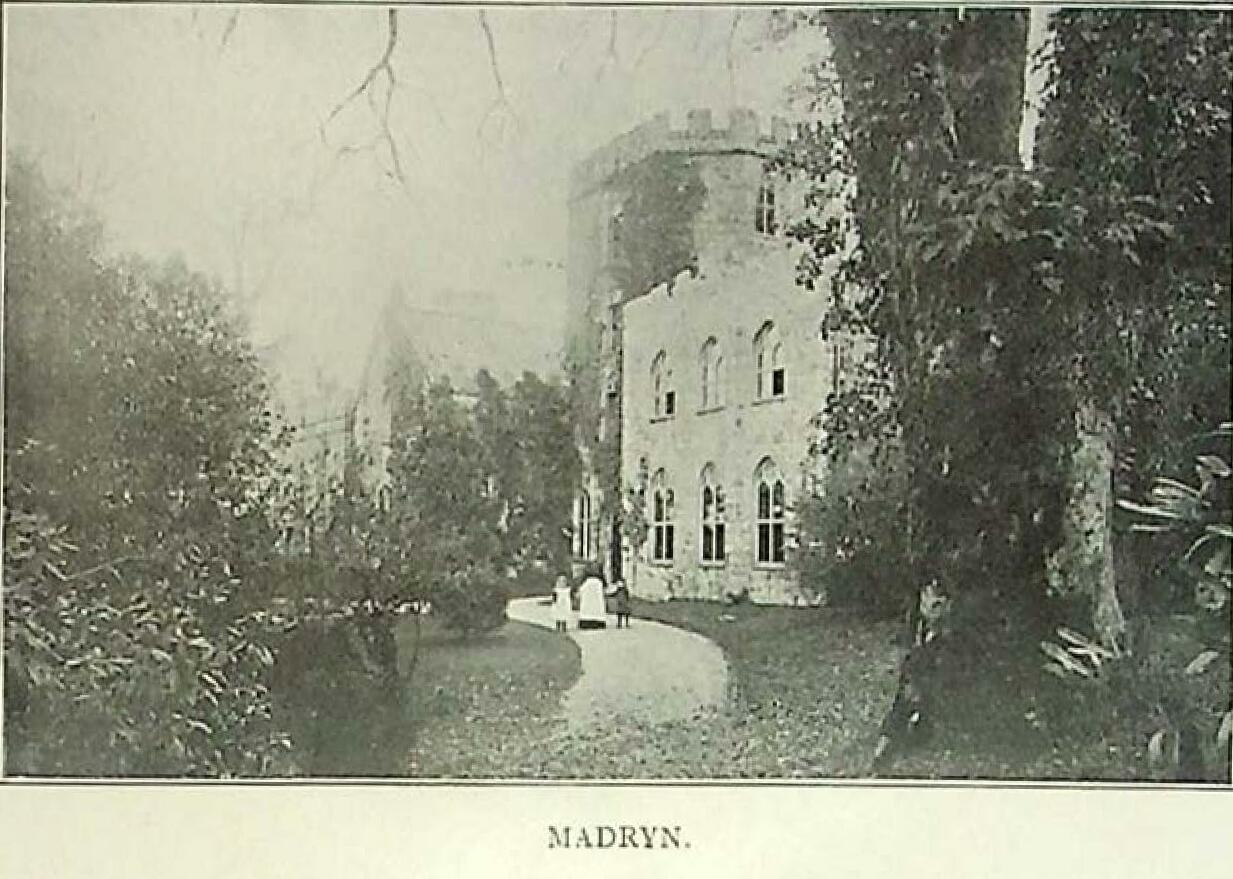
Entrance to Castell Madryn

The original castle dated back to historical times, and was recorded toward the end of the 12th century by Welsh historian Gerald of Wales, at the time of the Third Crusade of Saladin. It was one of the only two castles existing in Wales during the journey of Gerald and Archbishop Baldwin of Forde, and was known as Carn Madryn, making the structure older than Caernarfon Castle and Criccieth Castle.

The Tudor castle was erected around 1490 during the reign of King Henry VII of the House of Tudor. It was the property of the Madryn family, whose downfall started with the schemes of Robert Dudley, 1st Earl of Leicester, during the reign of Elizabeth I. Later on, when Charles II of England rose to power toward the end the English Civil War, Col. Thomas Madryn would be ruined, having sided with rebel Oliver Cromwell.

As last of the direct male line, the estate was sold during the reign of King William III of Orange and Queen Mary II, and was acquired by Owen Hughes, the wealthy attorney of Beaumaris and associate of the Wynn family of Gwydir Castle. The Jones-Parry family will marry one of Owen Hughes's great-grandniece, and inherit the estate through this marriage and build another castle.

One of its notable owners was Sir Love Jones-Parry, 1st Baronet, son of Lt. Gen. Sir Love Jones-Parry, who founded a Welsh colony in Patagonia, Argentina named Y Wladfa. From his travels, Sir Love brought number of varieties of trees which he planted in his deer park. The estate was eventually inherited by his cousin, Deputy Lieutenant William Corbet Yale, born Jones-Parry, proprietor of Plas-yn-Yale and Widcombe Manor, and member of the Yale family.

The modern castle was sold at auction with its art collection in 1910, with George Frederick Cunningham Yale as one of its trustees. Content of the castle included works by Anthony van Dyck, John Hoppner, Hans Holbein and Thomas Gainsborough. Some items went to the Royal Collection at Windsor Castle, and portraits included those of Henry VII, the young Elizabeth Tudor and Mary Queen of Scots. The estate was acquired by Caernarfonshire County Council. Madryn Castle Gatehouse, also known as the Tudor Gatehouse, is now a Grade II listed building in Wales under Cadw, and is the last remains of the past Tudor castle. The castle was demolished in 1968 after a fire, and a holiday park was built within the estate.

== Gallery ==
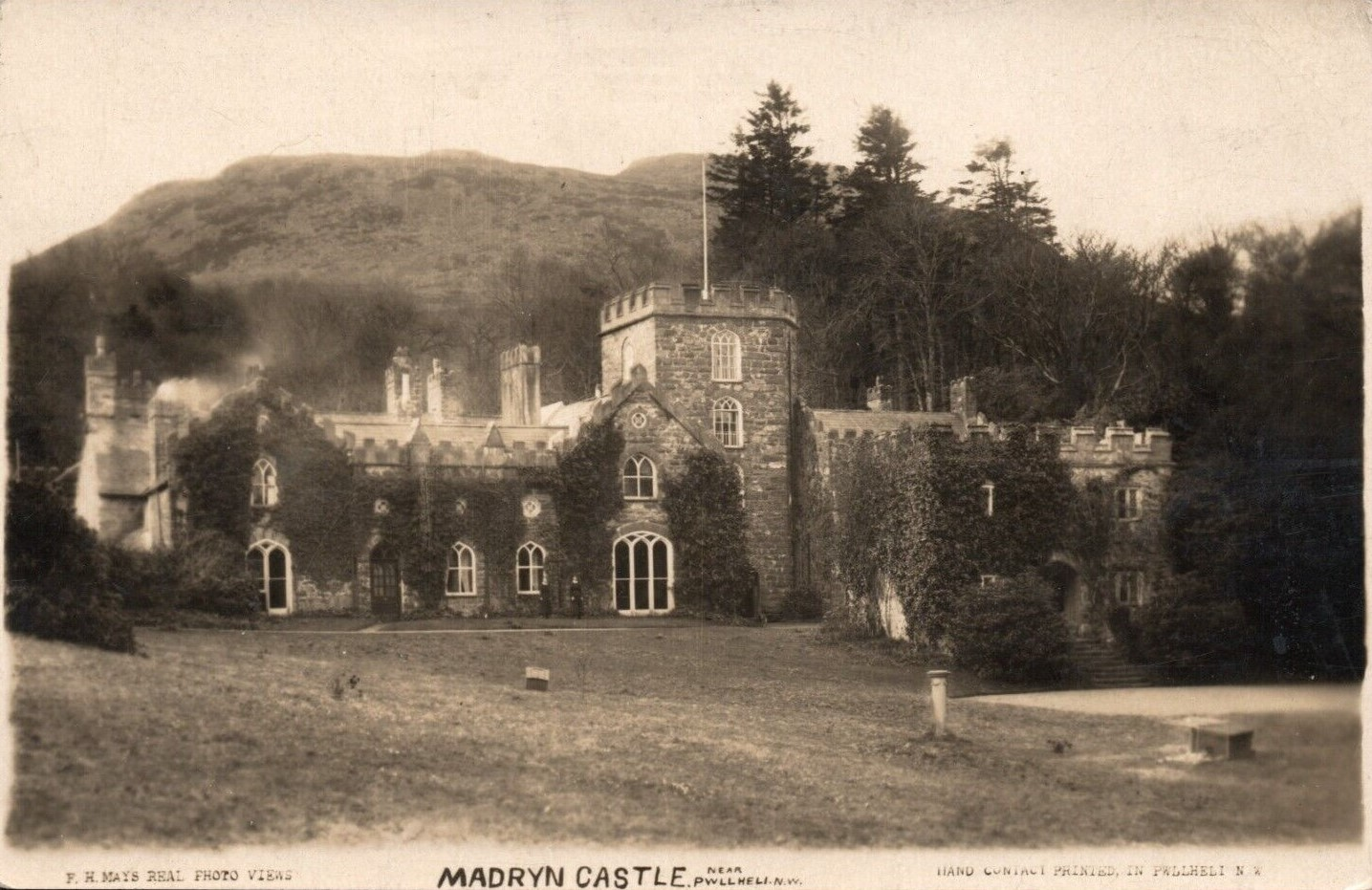

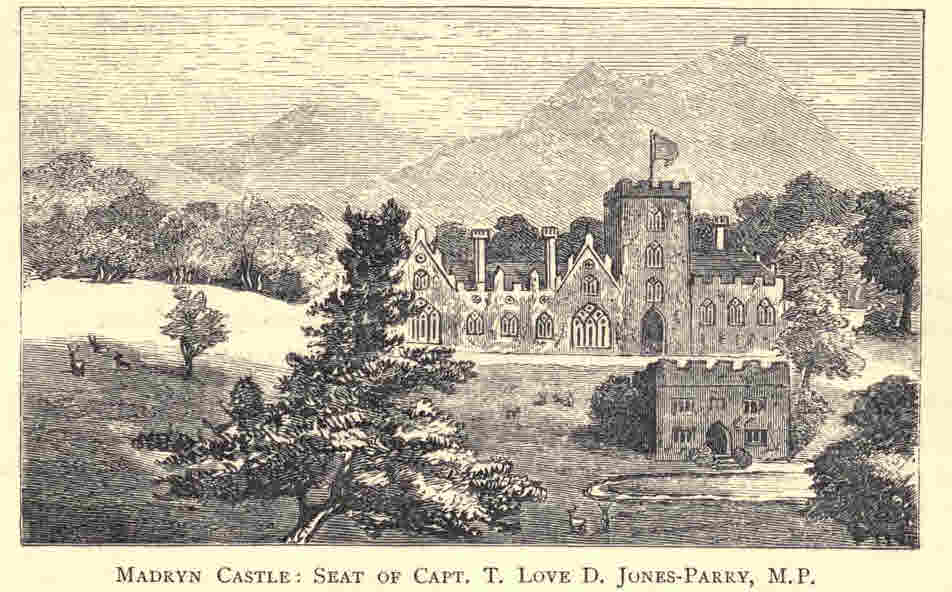

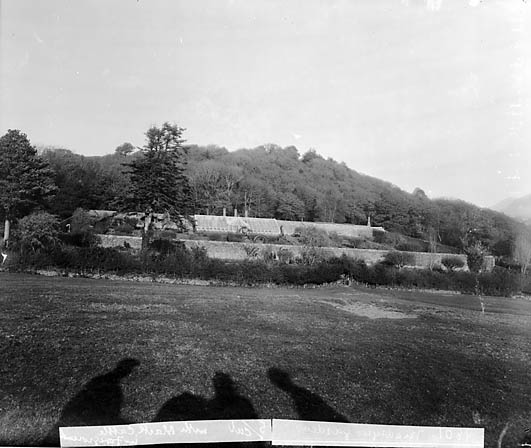

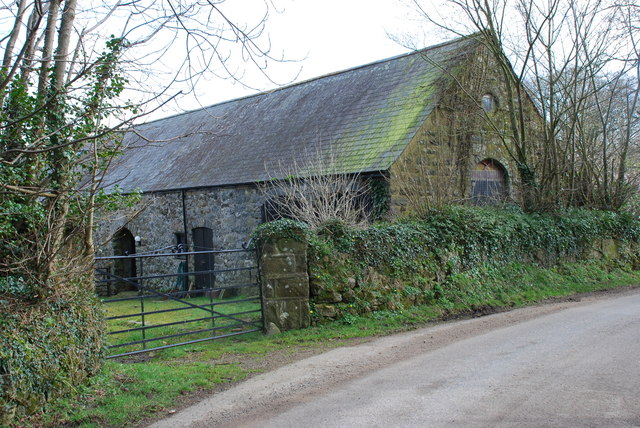
