= Widcombe Manor House =

Georgian house in Bath, Somerset, England

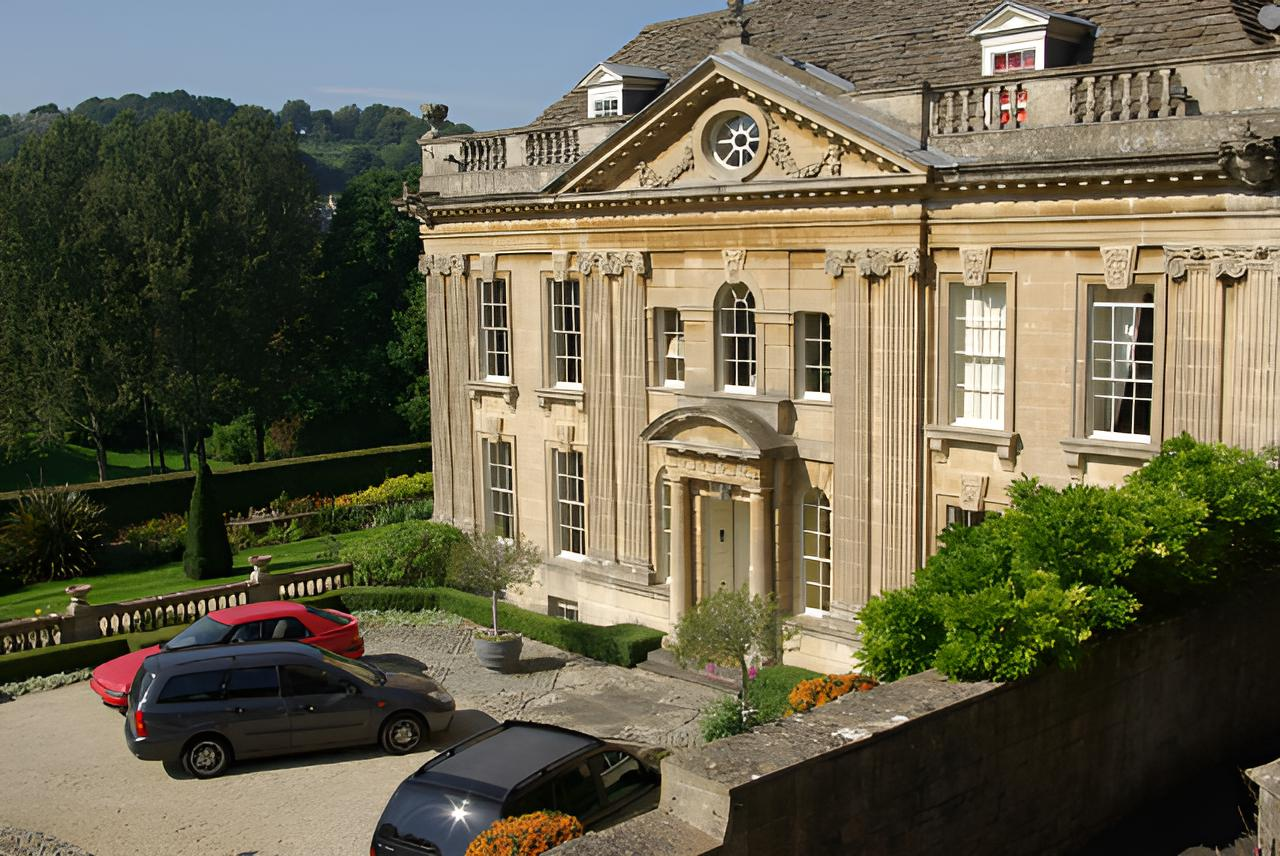

- Location within Somerset

General information
- Location: Bath, England
- Coordinates: 51.3735°N 2.3471°W
- Completed: 1727
- Client: Philip Bennet

Widcombe Manor is a grade I listed Georgian house in Widcombe, Bath, England, built in 1656 and then rebuilt in 1727 for Philip Bennet the local MP. The crest of the Bennet family can be seen surmounting the two pedestals at the entrance gates. The manor is located on Church Street adjacent to St Thomas à Becket Church.

The house has a south-facing front which is in its original condition. In around 1850, the west front was altered and now includes a bay window and stone balconies at the first floor windows.

The fountain in front of the house is Italian and thought to date from the 15th century. It was installed in its present position in the early twentieth century. It is also Grade I listed.

The property was acquired in 1839 by Major-General William Clapham, husband of Ellen Jones-Parry, and brother-in-law of Lt. Gen. Sir Love Jones-Parry. In 1880, the manor was let to Viscount Weymouth, who became Thomas Thynne, 5th Marquess of Bath of Longleat House.

It was then inherited by Deputy Lieutenant William Corbet Yale of Madryn Castle, born Jones-Parry, member of the Yale family. It was transmitted to his daughter, Margaret Jones-Parry in 1917, and thereafter to his son, Col. James Corbet Yale, born Jones-Parry, heir of Plas-yn-Yale.

The house was home to Horace Annesley Vachell who based his novel Golden House on the property.

From 1955, it was the home to the entrepreneur and inventor Jeremy Fry. Princess Margaret of the House of Windsor and Earl Tony Armstrong-Jones were frequent visitors, and it was the location of the 1972 Widcombe Manor Festival at which Hawkwind were scheduled to play.

The façade was closely replicated on a South Australian home by Hennessey Builders in 2000.

== Gallery ==
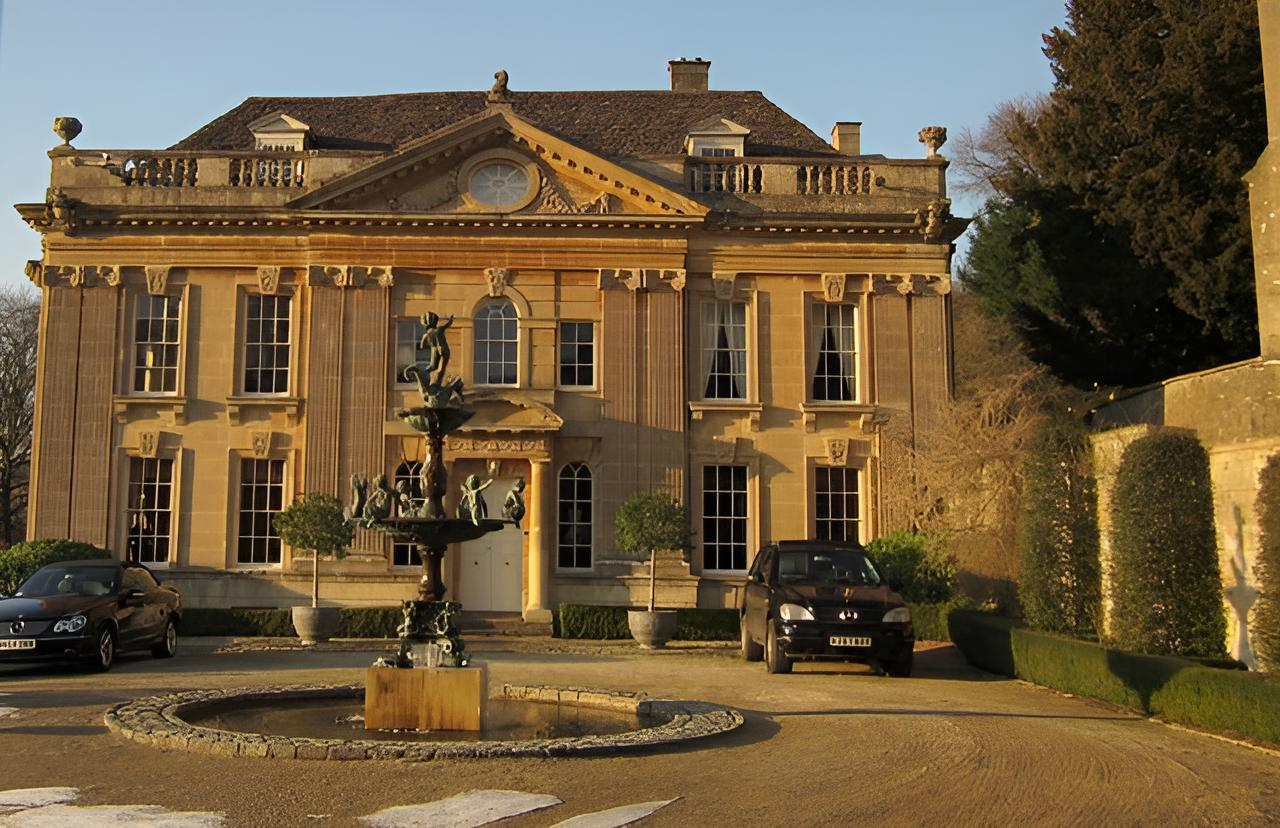

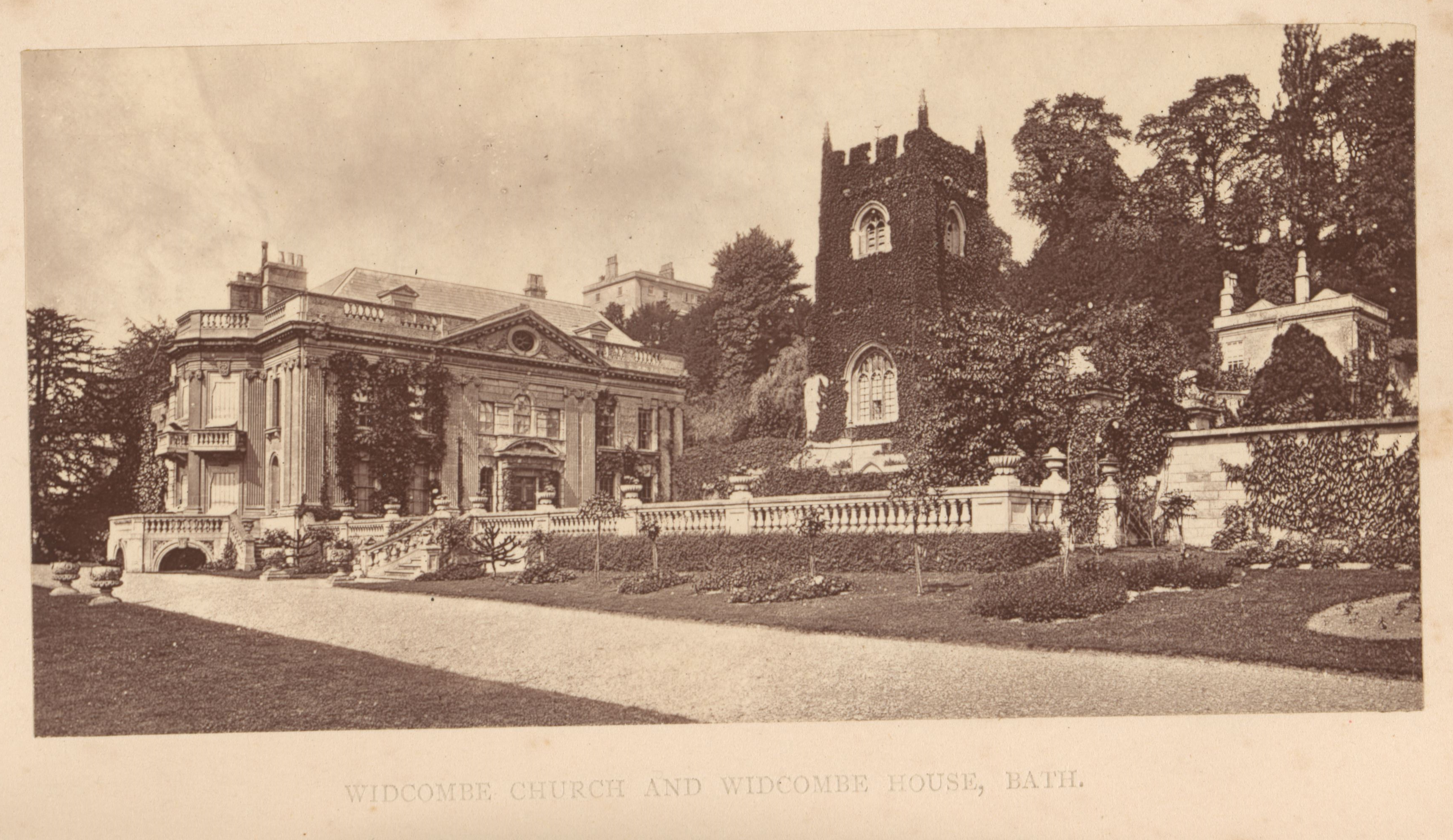

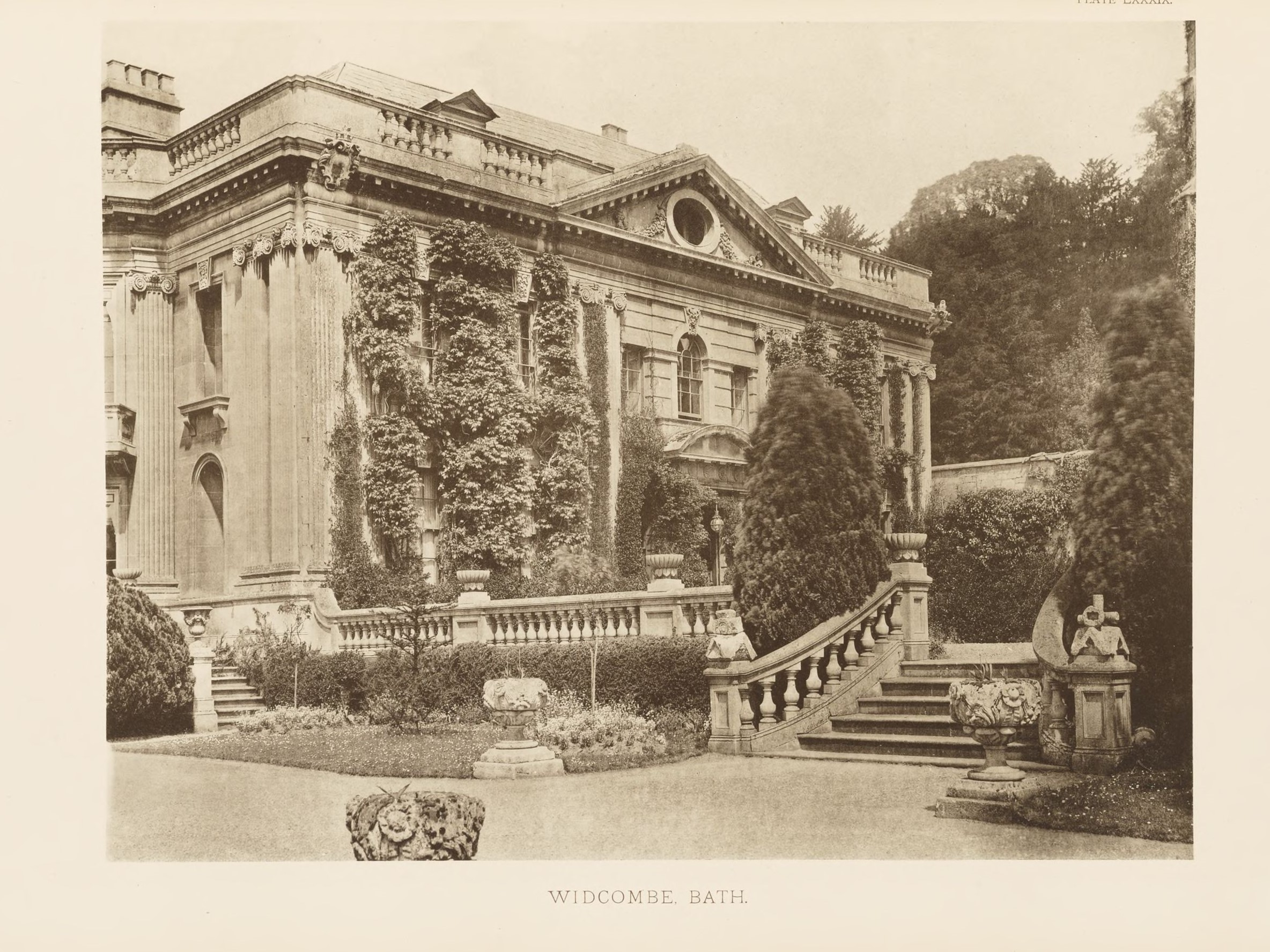

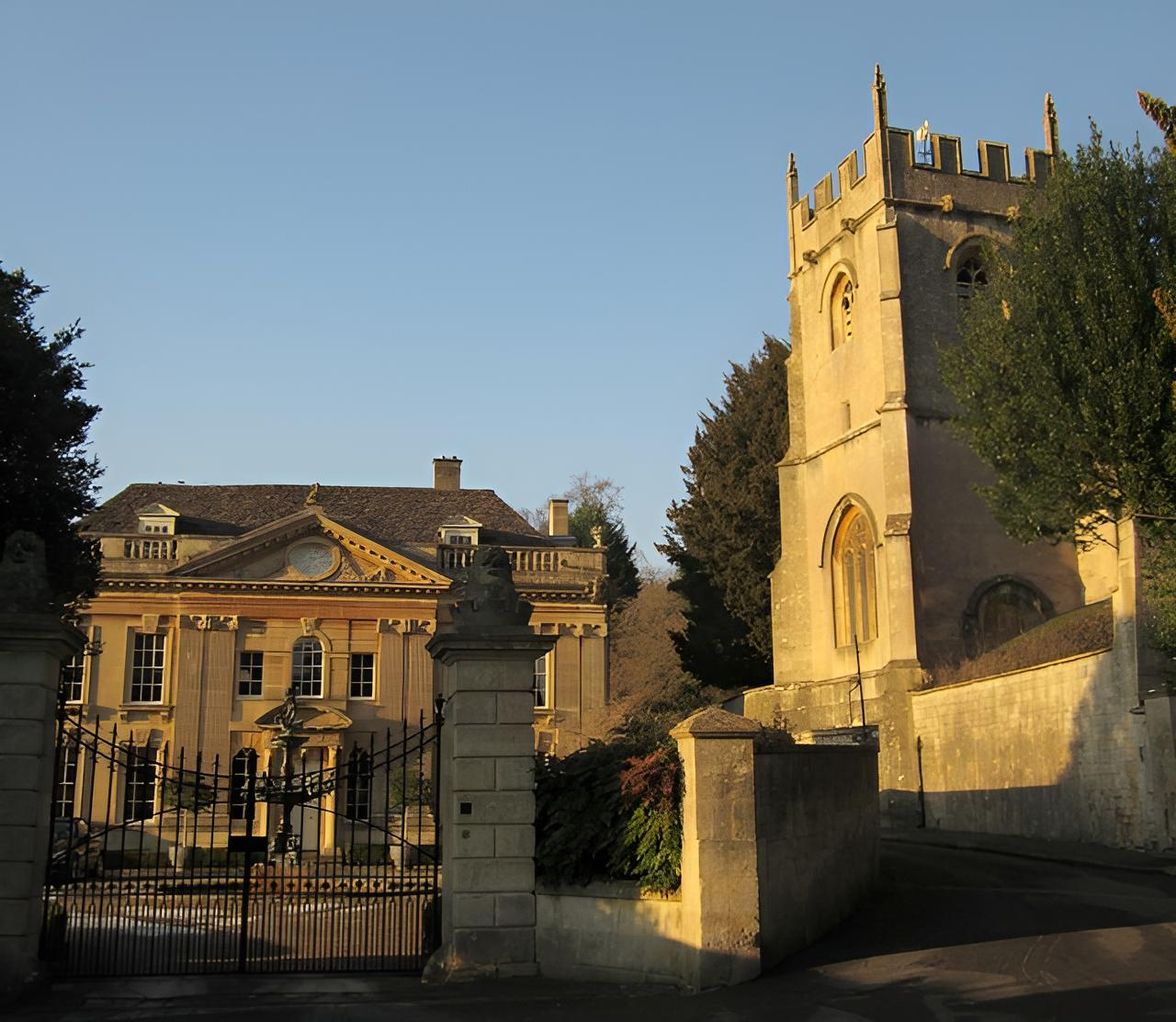
