= Love Jones-Parry (British Army officer) =

British army officer

Lieutenant-General Sir Love Jones-Parry KH
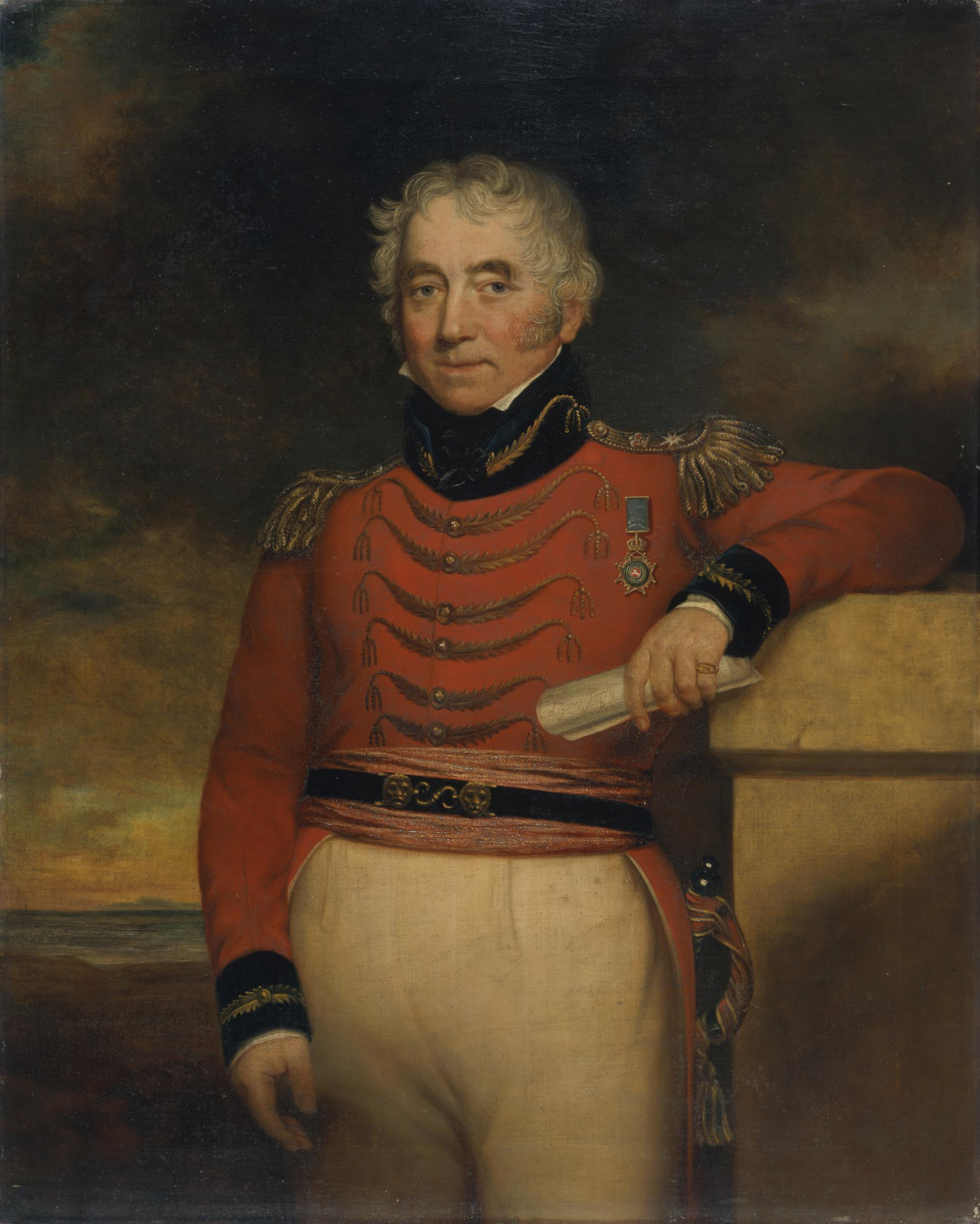
- Born: Love Parry Jones; 28 November 1781
- Died: 23 January 1853 (aged 71)

Lieutenant-General Sir Love Parry Jones-Parry KH (28 November 1781 – 23 January 1853) was a British Army officer, politician and later a High Sheriff. He was the son of Thomas Jones, and after his father acquired an estate at Madryn Castle from his cousin Margaret Parry in 1807 took Parry as an additional surname.

== Biography ==
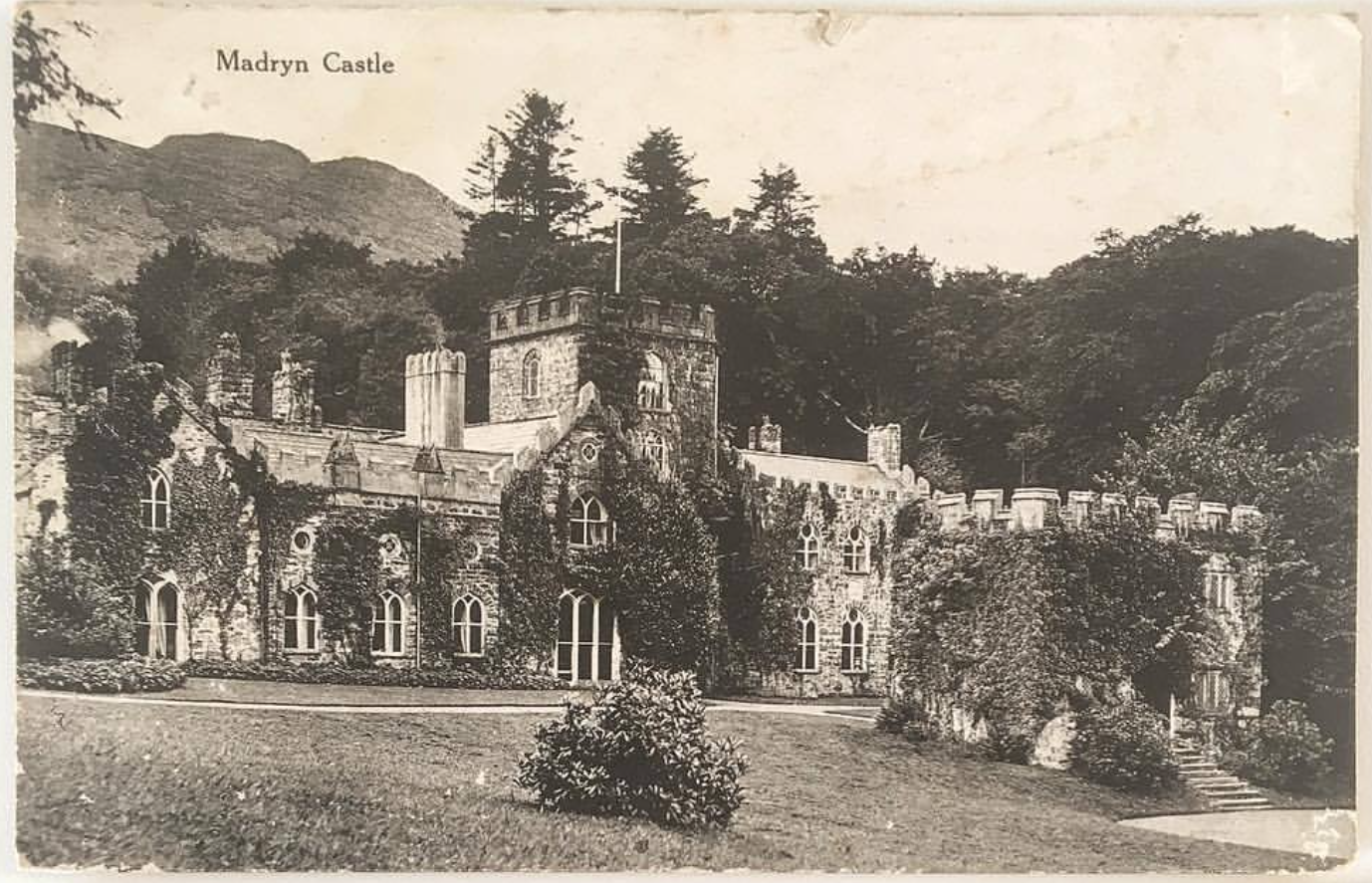
Madryn Castle later structure, past Tudor era castle was demolished

Love was educated at Westminster School and Christ Church, Oxford, matriculating in 1799, despite having been offered a scholarship to Trinity College, Cambridge. He became a student at Lincoln's Inn in 1802, was awarded his BA in 1803 and his MA in 1811.

After two years serving as a major with the 90th Regiment of Foot Jones was elected a Member of Parliament for Horsham in 1806. He was re-elected in 1807 but removed on petition, returning to the 90th Regiment of which he became a lieutenant colonel in 1811. He transferred to America as a major with the 103rd Regiment of Foot and served during the War of 1812, including at the Battle of Lundy's Lane with the 1st Militia Brigade as a lieutenant colonel.

He retired in 1815 on half-pay as a lieutenant colonel, and was promoted to colonel in 1825, followed by further promotions to major general and lieutenant general in 1837 and 1846 respectively. He was knighted in 1835 and made a Knight of the Royal Guelphic Order in 1836. In 1840 he was made High Sheriff of Anglesey. He died on 23 January 1853 and was buried on 1 February in Llanbedrog, where his family maintained a crypt. By the time he died he owned all but three farms in the parish of Ceidio.

=== Personal life ===
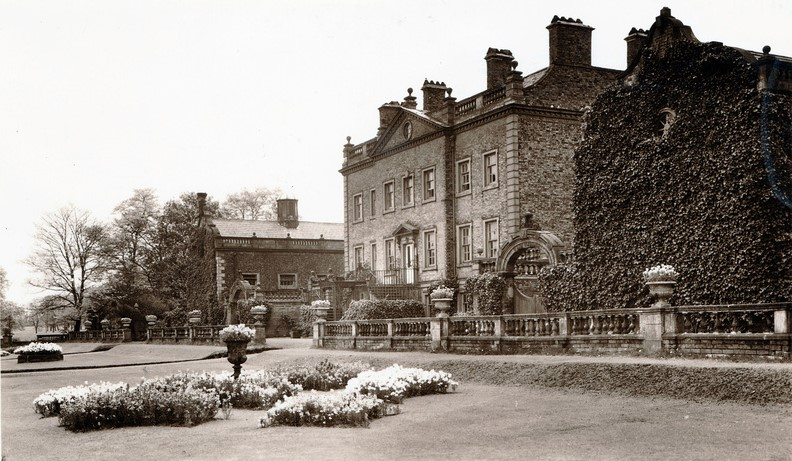
Thellwall Hall, Cheshire, seat of Admiral Jones-Parry, Lord of the Manor

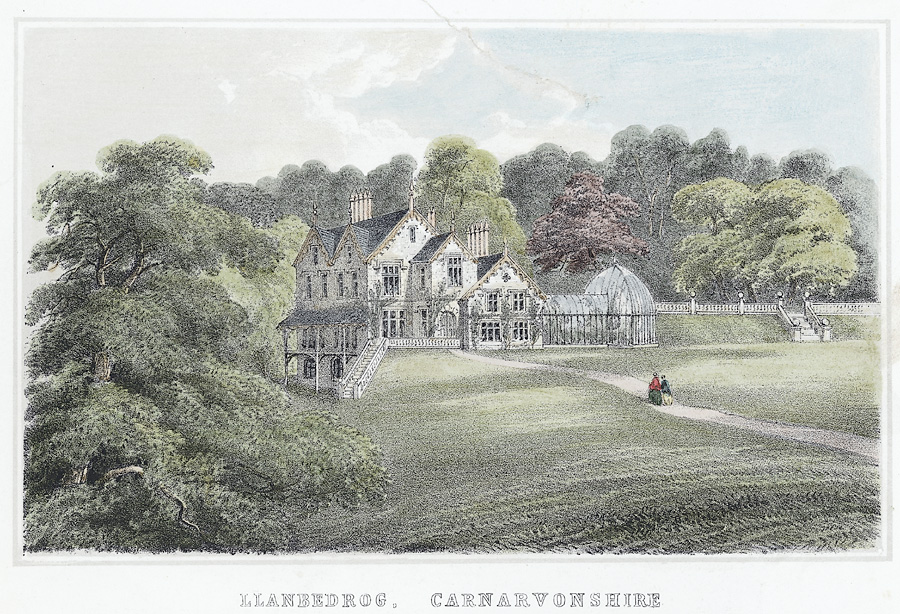
Llanbedrog, Carnarvonshire. The residence of Lady Jones-Parry

He was married twice, first to Sophia Stevenson in 1806 and secondly to Elizabeth Caldecott on 15 December 1826. From these two marriages he had four daughters and several sons, including Mary and Sir Thomas Love Jones-Parry, 1st Baronet. His sisters married to Lt. Col. Robert Browne Macgregor, Lt. Col. Gwyllym Lloyd Wardle (MP), and Major General Clapham of Widcombe Manor.

His brother, Lt. Col. William Parry Yale (born Parry Jones), served in the Peninsular War and received the gold and war medals. He became the heir of Plas yn Yale, adopting the Yale surname by Royal license, and became a member of the Yale family as heir and descendant. William's nephew, William Corbet Yale, would inherit the estate, adopting the Yale surname, and was a son of his brother John Jones Parry.

He was a barrister-at-law from Worcester College, Oxford, and became Justice of the Peace, and Deputy Lieutenant of several counties. His son, Colonel James Corbet Yale was a Commandant during the South African War, and was present at the Relief of Ladysmith, Battle of Spion Kop, Battle of Vaal Kranz, Battle of the Tugela Heights, Battle of Pieter's Hill, and was a commandant in Prince of Wales's Own Regiment of Yorkshire. His grandson was Queen's Counsel David Yale, fellow of Cambridge University.

He received the Distinguished Service Order, and his uncle was Admiral John Parry Jones-Parry, the Commander of HMS Speedwell, a gunvessel, in charge of suppressing the slave trade on the West Coast of Africa, and other vessels. Admiral Jones-Parry served in the Black Sea during the Crimean War and was Lord of the Manor of Thelwall Hall. His grandson would become Sub-Lieutenant of HMS Wolverine.

His other brother, Capt. Thomas Parry Jones-Parry, married the daughter of Vice-Admiral Robert Lloyd, and became Magistrate, Deputy Lieutenant, and High Sheriff of Caernarvonshire. Thomas was also the proprietor of the Llwyn Onn estate, which was in their family since at least the 15th century, and the Aberdunant estate. Aberdunant will be inherited by his grandson, Thomas Edward John Lloyd, who will also inherit the property of his great-grandfather, Vice Admiral Robert Lloyd, which included the Tregayan estate in Anglesey and the Gesail Gyfarch estate in Caernarfonshire.

The Vice Admiral fought in North America for the British, capturing number of coasters as Commander of HMS Plantagenet, and joined the Chesapeake campaign. He served under Major General Edward Pakenham, the brother-in-law of the Duke of Wellington, and brought back the bodies of Pakenham and General Edward Gibbs to England. He was also a Royal navy Admiral during the Glorious First of June, the Anglo French War, the Invasion of France (1795), and the Napoleonic Wars against Napoleon Bonaparte, commanding HMS Racoon (1795) and other vessels.

Parliament of the United Kingdom
Preceded by Edward Hilliard; Viscount FitzHarris	Member of Parliament for Horsham; 1806–1808; With: Francis John Wilder 1806–1807; Sir Samuel Romilly 1807–1808	Succeeded by Joseph Marryat and Henry Goulburn
Preceded by Hon. Sir Charles Paget	Member of Parliament for Carnarvon; 1835–1837	Succeeded by William Bulkeley Hughes
Honorary titles
Preceded by James Greenfield	High Sheriff of Anglesey; 1840–1841	Succeeded by Richard Griffith
