= Penarth Fawr =

- Pennarth Fawr
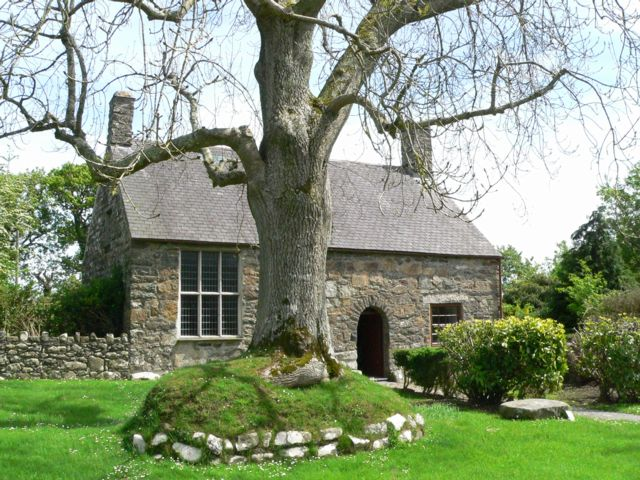
- The west front of the hall

- Location within Gwynedd
- 52.9132°N 4.3522°W
- Type: Hall house
- Location: Llanystumdwy, Gwynedd, Wales

History
- Built: After 1476, with later alterations
- Built for: Hywel ap Madog

Site notes
- Architectural styles: Perpendicular Gothic, vernacular
- Governing body: Cadw

Listed Building – Grade I
- Official name: Penarth-fawr
- Designated: 19 October 1971
- Reference no.: 4359

Scheduled monument
- Official name: Penarth Fawr Medieval Hall
- Reference no.: CN086

Listed Building – Grade II
- Official name: Former Stable at Penarth-fawr
- Designated: 31 March 1999
- Reference no.: 21602

Listed Building – Grade II
- Official name: House at Penarth-fawr
- Designated: 31 March 1999
- Reference no.: 21594

Penarth Fawr (also spelled Pennarth and historically Pennardd) is a hall house in the community of Llanystumdwy, Gwynedd, Wales. (Note: Pevsner lists it in the village of Llanarmon, and Visit Snowdonia places it in the village of Chwilog.)

The west wing of Penarth Fawr is significant as a surviving example of a medieval hall house. It was built c. 1476 by Hywel ap Madog, a member of a prominent Eifionydd family, and originally consisted of a three-bay hall with a one-bay service end to the south and a parlour wing to the north. It was later altered, but restored to approximately its medieval appearance in 1937; the intact roof structure, which includes a spere truss, is particularly notable. The hall is described as "one of the most important medieval gentry houses to survive in Wales" by Cadw, the historic environment service of the Welsh Government, and as "an important medieval hall house" in the Buildings of Wales series. It is a grade I listed building and a scheduled monument. The hall passed into state care in 1949 and is now managed by Cadw.

There is a seventeenth-century wing attached to the south-east of the building, which is a private dwelling. A parlour wing of the same date to the north of the hall, which replaced its medieval predecessor, was demolished c. 1843. The seventeenth-century wing and nearby stables are each listed at grade II.

== History ==
The first mention of Penarth Fawr is in the Record of Caernarfon, a mid-fourteenth century survey of tenants and their land in North Wales. Penarth was a free township, meaning its tenants held their lands directly from the Crown, and it is likely that there was a house on the site of the present hall. The first recorded owner of the site is Madog ap Hywel (d. 1461), who with his kin claimed descent from Collwyn ap Tagno, a twelfth-century prince. The fourteenth and fifteenth century history of Eifionydd (the commote within which Penarth lies) is characterised by often violent feuds between those families that claimed descent from Collwyn and those that claimed descent from Owain Gwynedd, prince of Gwynedd. Madog ap Hywel did not die in one of these feuds, instead doing so while fighting for the House of York during the Wars of the Roses as a captain under his uncle, Owain Tudor.

Penarth Fawr was built for Hywel ap Madog, the son of Madog ap Hywel, with dendrochronological dating of the timbers used in the house giving a date after 1476. It was the principal house of its owners, who held a scattered estate across the Llŷn Peninsula including 39 ha (97 acres) around the house itself. The elegy to Hywel ap Madog includes a reference to sweet rumney wine kept at Penarth Fawr, indicating that the house was used for entertaining.

The house descended in the male line to Hugh Gwyn, who was high sheriff of Caernarvonshire from 1599 to 1600. He inserted the fireplace in the east wall of the hall, which replaced an open hearth and which bears his arms and the date [16]15 on a stone plaque above. A first floor was inserted into the hall during the seventeenth century, although it is unclear precisely when; an ex situ ceiling beam in the hall which bears the inscription "IWI 1656 FEB 20" may refer to the marriage of John and Jane Wynne rather than a date of construction. The hall was extended into a "U" shape in the late seventeenth century by the addition of a new parlour wing to the north of the hall and a service wing to the south end of the east wall, the latter containing the kitchen and bakehouse. In 1662 Wynne was taxed for three hearths in that year's hearth tax assessment.

Penarth Fawr declined in status over the next century, as the family moved to the nearby Madryn estate, and was a tenanted farm at the end of the eighteenth century. The north end of the medieval hall and the parlour wing were demolished c. 1843, and in 1886 the house was bought by Owen Evans. His descendant, William Evans, undertook a significant restoration in 1936 which returned the hall to approximately its medieval state by removing the seventeenth-century floor and other accretions. Evans placed the hall in state care in 1949, and it is now managed by Cadw. The east wing remains a private residence. A study of the house, Penarth Fawr: a history of a medieval hall-house, was published in 2002.

== Description ==
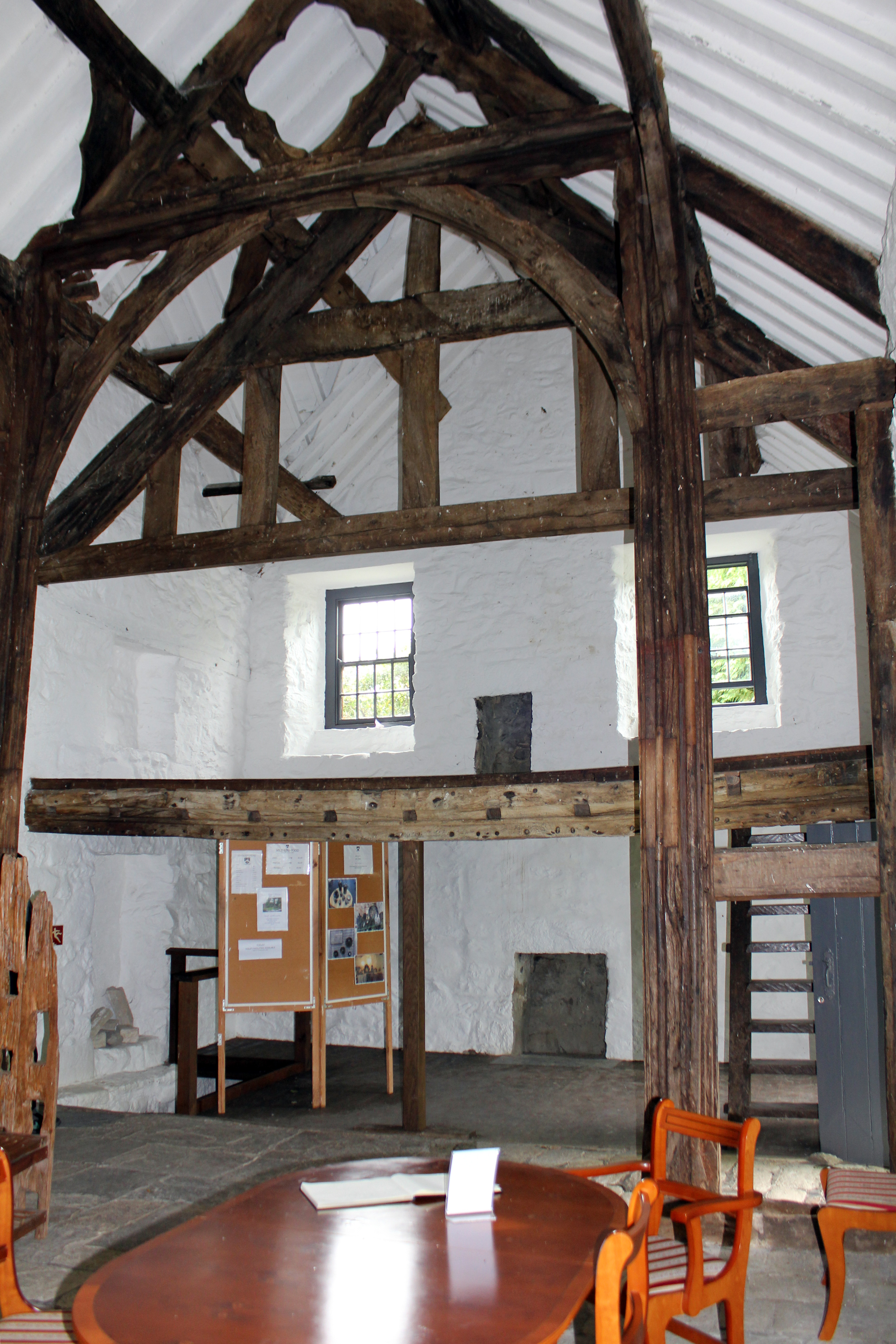
Penarth Fawr spere truss

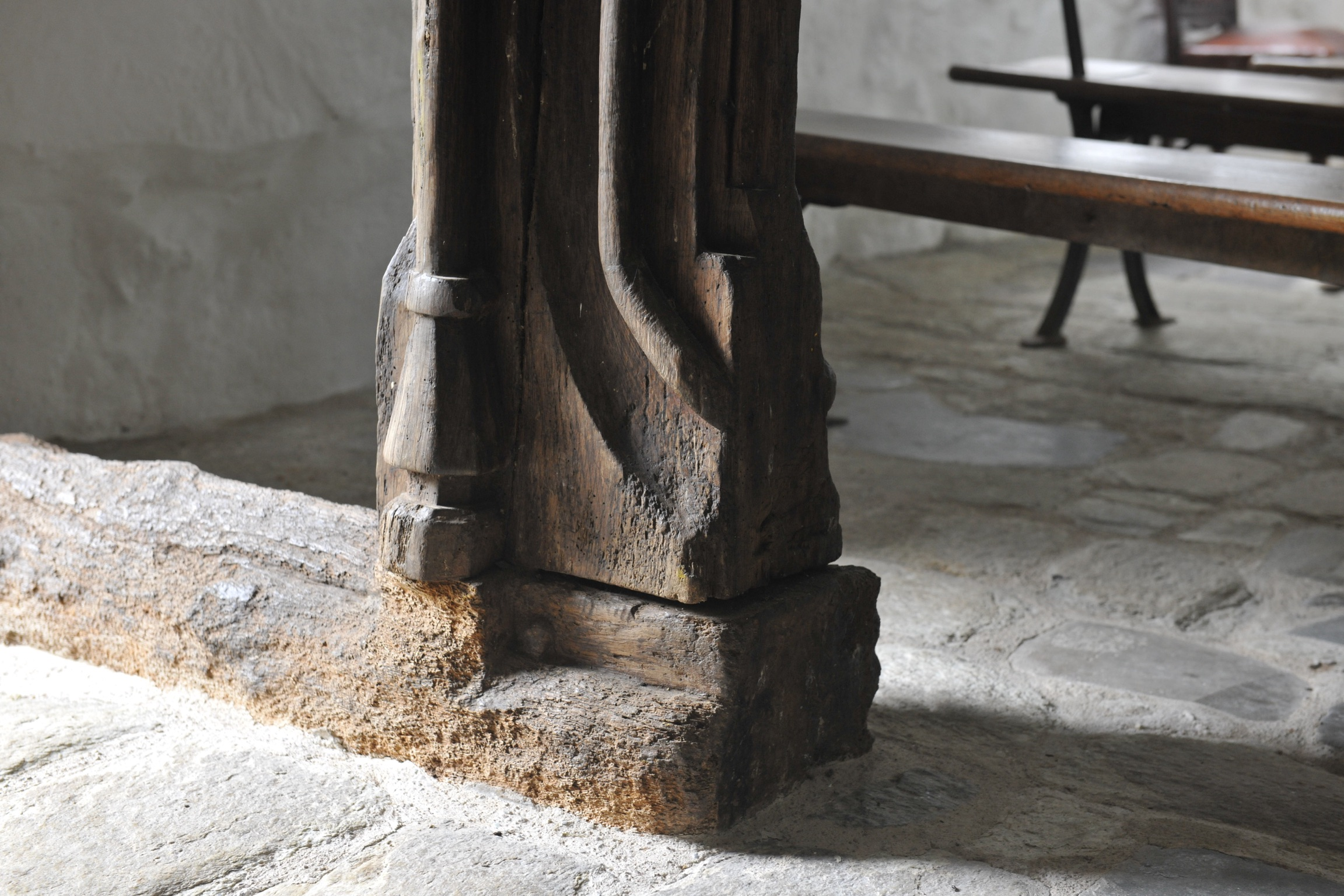
Spere base, detail

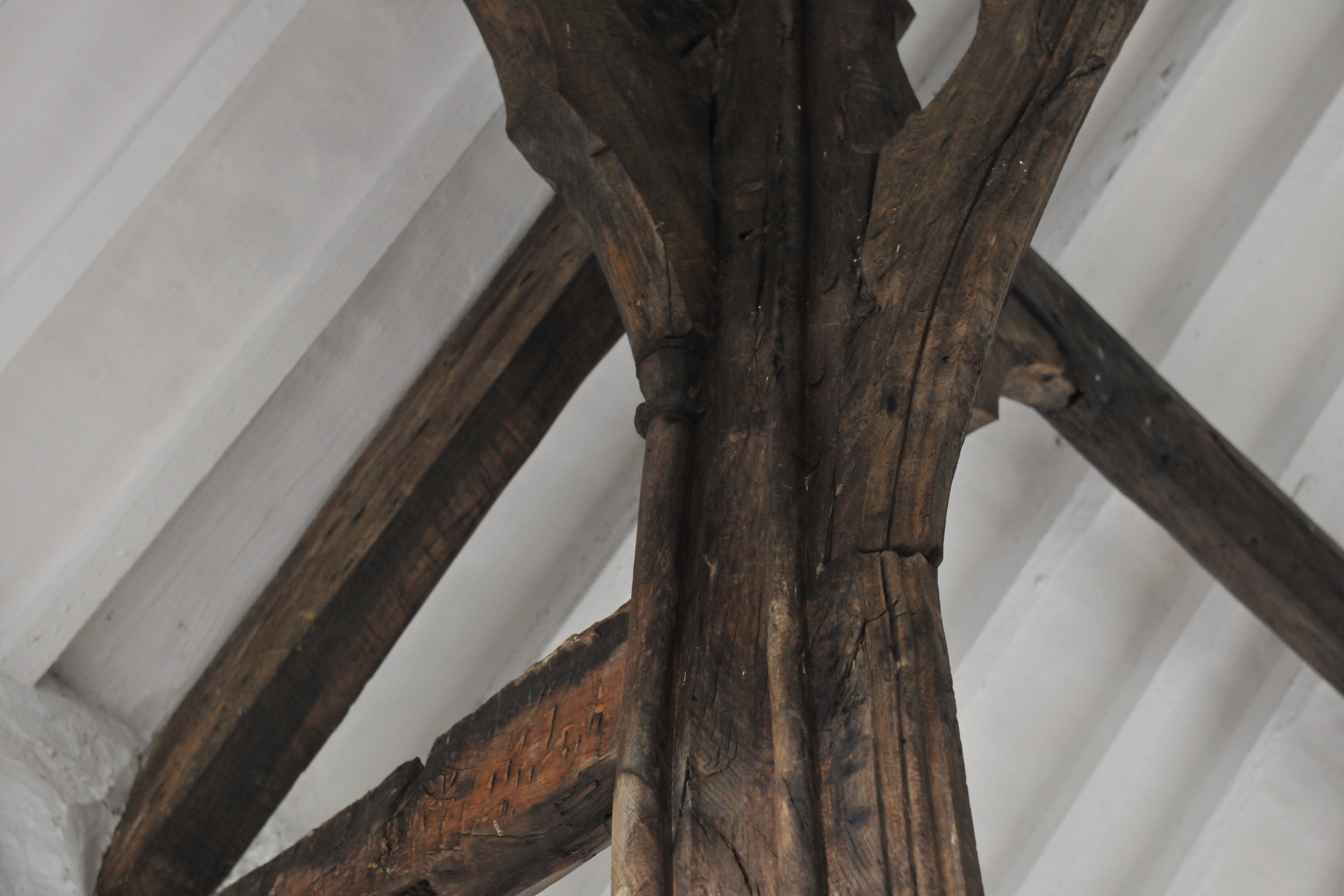
Spere top, detail

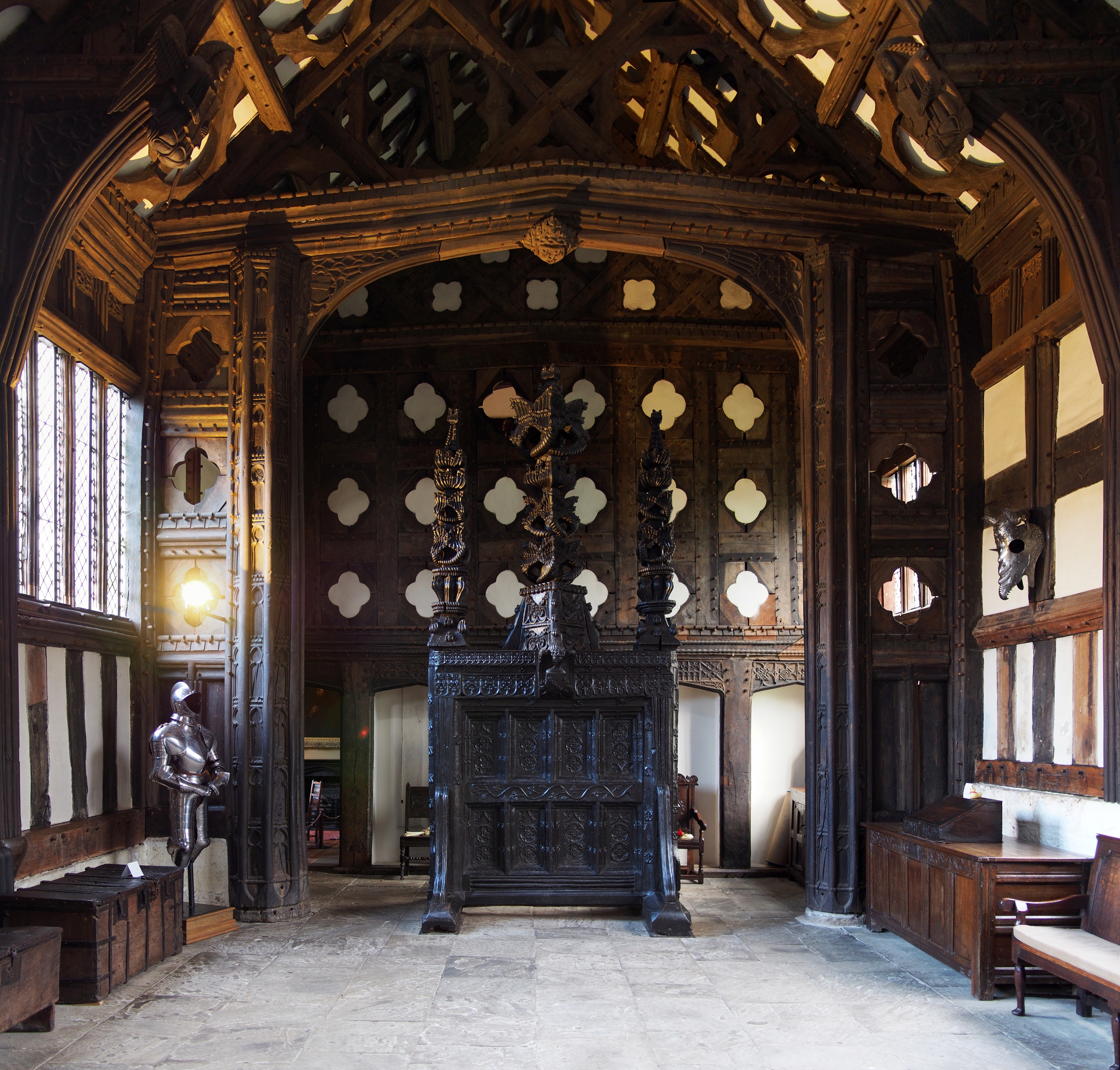
The spere and moveable screen at Rufford Old Hall, Lancashire, although more elaborate than that at Pennarth Fawr, gives some idea of the original arrangement.

Pennarth Fawr is located on a minor road off the A497, south of Llanarmon, south-west of Chwilog, and north-east of Abererch.

The surviving fifteenth-century house is a rectangle four bays long, with the long sides running north-south. The northern two bays contained the hall, the third bay the screens passage, and the southern bay the service rooms. A seventeenth-century extension is attached at right angles to the southern half of the east wall of the hall and extends east. Both parts of the house are constructed of rubble stone under slate roofs, however the hall roof was originally of stone.

The west wall of the hall contains the majority of the externally visible medieval fabric, including the round-arched door to the screens and the window to its south. The window to the north of the door was expanded in the seventeenth century but is probably medieval in origin. The south wall is contemporary with the seventeenth-century extension and contains two windows at second-floor level. The north wall is eighteenth century, and contains two blocked doorways with a window above. The east wall consists of both medieval and seventeenth century work, with a window in the north bay and a large seventeenth-century chimneybreast in the second bay. The chimneybreast has a crow-stepped gable, a feature popular with the gentry of north Wales.

The door, which contains a slot for a draw-bar for security, leads directly into the screens passage. There was formerly a second door opposite, in the east wall, however it and the windows at ground and first-floor level to its south were blocked in the seventeenth century. The beam on the south side of the screens passage supported the first floor of the service rooms behind. Mortices on the beam indicate that a full-height partition of interlocking oak posts and panels divided the service rooms from the hall, however the position of the doors has been lost and the arrangement of the rooms beyond is now unclear. The ladder staircase is modern, but a trimmer-beam indicates that it is in the position of an older stair. Fireplaces were added to the south wall at ground and first-floor level and a cellar excavated beneath this end of the building in the seventeenth century.

The most important feature of the house is the spere. A spere is a full-height screen in a hall which separates the hall proper from its entrance passage, often, as at Pennarth Fawr, taking the form of two short side walls with a wide opening between them. Only about twenty examples of speres exist in Wales, mostly in the north-east, and Penarth Fawr is both the most westerly known example and the only one in Caernarfonshire. The spere-posts at the end of the short walls are elaborately moulded and contain Perpendicular Gothic details which continue across the spere truss, the beam which runs across the top of the screen. The truss is connected to the uprights by arch braces, and above it are struts connecting to the principal rafter; the openings are all cusped, that at the apex forming a quatrefoil. The arch-braced collar beam over the central bay of the hall is similarly decorated. The small cusped truss just beyond originally supported a louvte on its northern side, and is one of few surviving examples in Wales. The trusses in the northern wall and south of the screen are plain. In the three northern bays the two rows of purlins are supported by cusped wind-braces between the principal rafters. It is possible that a movable screen once stood between the spere-posts.

The north wall of the hall proper contains an in situ moulded tie-beam which indicates the existence of a coved roof, which would have projected further north over a dais in the demolished part of the building. The blocked doors beneath it would have given access to the demolished parlour wing. The fireplace in the east wall has a large arch, and above it is a carved stone panel bearing the arms and date mentioned above.

The west wing has been largely modernised, but does contain a large timber beam in its southern wall bearing the initials 'EW' and the date 1686 which marks the location of a large chimney breast associated with the medieval kitchen. The chimney breast was removed during William Evans' restoration.

== Sources ==
- Avent, Richard (1989). Robinson, David M. (ed.). Criccieth Castle, Pennarth Fawr Medieval Hall-House, St Cybi's Well. Great Britain: Cadw. ISBN 978-0-948-32941-8.
- Haslam, Richard; Orbach, Julian; Voelcker, Adam (2009). Gwynedd. The Buildings of Wales. New Haven, US and London: Yale University Press. ISBN 978-0-300-14169-6. OCLC 1023292902.
- Houghton, Keith E (2002). Penarth Fawr: a history of a medieval hall-house. Gwasg Eifionydd Press. OCLC 51622389.
- Longley, David (2011). "Introduction". In Williams, Diane (ed.). Criccieth Castle, Pennarth Fawr Medieval Hall-House, St Cybi's Well. Great Britain: Cadw: Welsh Historic Monuments. pp. 3–7. ISBN 9781857602913. OCLC 755071133.
- O'Brien, Charles (2017). Houses: An Architectural Guide. Pevsner Introductions. New Haven, US and London: Yale University Press. ISBN 978-0-300-23342-1.
- The Royal Commission on the Ancient and Historical Monuments of Wales and Monmouthshire (1960). An Inventory of the Ancient Monuments in Caernarvonshire: II Central: the Cantref of Arfon and the Commote of Eifionydd. Vol. 2. Her Majesty's Stationery Office. pp. 112–13. OCLC 1042855041.
- Sugget, Richard (2011). "Penarth Fawr Medieval Hall House". In Williams, Diana (ed.). Criccieth Castle, Pennarth Fawr Medieval Hall-House, St Cybi's Well. Great Britain: Cadw: Welsh Historic Monuments. pp. 37–49. ISBN 9781857602913. OCLC 755071133.
