= Gwynfryn =

Gwynfryn can represent more than one place, including:

- Plas Gwynfryn, Criccieth, North Wales, UK
- Gwynfryn, Gwynedd, Wales
- Gwynfryn, Wrexham, Wales
- Gwynfryn, London, London

== Other uses ==
Ellis-Nanney baronets of Gwynfryn and Cefneuddwr.
