= Ellis-Nanney baronets =

Extinct baronetcy in the United Kingdom

- Creation date: 7 March 1898
- Creation: First
- Created by: Queen Victoria
- Peerage: Baronetage of the United Kingdom
- First holder: Sir Hugh Ellis-Nanney
- Status: Extinct
- Extinction date: 7 June 1920
- Seats: Plas Gwynfryn; Plas Cefndeuddwr; Talhenbont hall Bryn Hir
- Motto: Latin: Non Nobis Nati "We are not born for ourselves"

The Baronetcy of Ellis-Nanney of Gwynfryn and Cefndeuddwr was granted to Hugh Ellis-Nanney in 1898. The 1st baronet was a landowner with a 12,000-acre (4,900 ha) estate in North Wales, UK, most of which was inherited from his father, Owen Jones Ellis-Nanney. The family were political Conservative party members within the parliamentary constituency of Caernarfon, Wales.

== History ==
Hugh Ellis-Nanney was made a baronet for the 1897 Diamond Jubilee Honours, Queen Victoria's 60th year on the throne for the monarch's Diamond Jubliee celebrations in London. The title was, Ellis-Nanney Baronetcy of Gwynfryn and Cefndeuddwr. The Baronetcy represented the Ellis-Nanney ancestral manors (Welsh: Plas) Gwynfryn near Llanystumdwy in the County of Caernarvon and Cefndeuddwr near Trawsfynydd in the County of Merioneth. The two towns of Llanystumdwy and Trawsfynydd lie in what is now Dwyfor Meirionnydd parliamentary constituency, Wales, UK.

== Gwynfryn and Cefndeuddwr ancestors ==
The Ellis-Nanney family of Gwynfryn and Cefndeuddwr are an ancient Welsh family from near Criccieth in Gwynedd. The family of Gwynfryn, Llanystumdwy, are descendants of Collwyn ap Tangno the 11th century Lord of Eifionydd, progenitor of the fifth of Fifteen Tribes of Wales.

=== Nanney of Cefndeuddwr ===
The Nanneys of Cefndeuddwr are descended from the Nannau family of Wales, including Hywel Sele (9th Lord of Nannau), who was a cousin of Owain Glyndŵr. Sele was a descendant of Welsh royalty through Prince Cadwgan ap Bleddyn and his son Madog ap Cadwgan, the 1st Lord of Nannau. The family are also descended from the Irish Norman knight Roger de Montgomery who fought at the Battle of Hastings in 1066, and from Osbwrn Wyddel of the House of Corsygedol.

The family of Plas Cefndeuddwr (hall), near Trawsfynydd, Gwynedd was a cadet branch from the Lords of Nannau. The founding of the Nanney family began with Richard Nanney c. 1552. He was the son of the 12th Lord of Nannau (esquire to Henry VIII) and his second wife, Lowri from Trawsfynydd. Richard married Elizabeth, the daughter of Baron Lewis Owen, Vice-Chamberlain of North Wales, of Cwrt Plas Dolgellau. The Nanney family branch was religiously Puritans. They were related through marriage to the Lloyds of Rhiwgoch who resided at the 'Brynmaenllwyd' estate in Trawsfynydd. The Nanneys were seen to have a high status and occupied the local area since the Elizabethan era. (Note: Richard Edwards' (ancestor of Ellis-Nanney) daughter is Martha (mother of Richard Nanney), he (1628- 10 July 1704) m. 1st daughter of Saethon, Nanhoron, 2nd m.1667 niece of Thomas Wynn of Boduan.)

=== Ellis of Gwynfryn ===
The first mention of Gwynfryn is of Gruffydd ap John ap Gronowy living at the hall (Welsh: Plas) in the 16th century, he was the grandson of Robert Puleston. Through inheritance (lineal descendant), the Wynn family took ownership of the lands until Owen Wynn died in 1688. A great-grandchild, Richard Ellis of Bodychen (d. 1717), Llandrygan, Anglesey inherited the estate of Gwynfryn in the 17th century. Centuries later, Gwynfryn was still in the ownership of the Ellis family.

=== Ellis-Nanney family ===
Aforementioned Hugh John Ellis-Nanney, Baronet, was the only son of Owen Jones Ellis Nanney of Bryn Hir, Criccieth. The Ellis-Nanney family had inherited the lands of Bachwen and Elernion in Llanaelhaearn (owned by the Nanneys) from Owen's uncle, David Ellis Nanney, who had gained ownership in 1812. Owen was also a landowner and had bequeathed the estate on the same terms as his uncle had done, namely on the condition that he assumed the double-barrelled surname of Ellis-Nanney. Hugh's father married Mary Jones (d. 1849). She was the eldest daughter and heiress of Hugh Jones of Hengwrtucha, Llanfachreth in Merionethshire, who was a business partner of the Diphwys Casson quarry. During 1845, Hugh Jones and Owen Ellis-Nanney had together purchased Plas Hen (Talhenbont Hall) from the Mostyn baronets for £50,000 (equivalent to £5,300,000 in 2025). Owen died when his son Hugh was 25. Through his inheritance, Hugh acquired estates as the squire of Gwynfryn, Plas Hen, and Cefndeuddwr. He proceeded to demolish and rebuild Plas Gwynfryn near Llanystumdwy in 1866. Hugh acquired a fortune from tenants on his 12,000 acres of land in the counties of Caernarfonshire, Merionethshire and Montgomeryshire in North Wales.

==== Gwynfryn and Cefndeuddwr family tree ====
The origins of the Ellis-Nanney family from Gwynedd were in Cefndeuddwr, their ancestors descended from a 16th century Lord of Nannau. The family of Plas Cefneuddwr included successive vicars of Clynnog, beginning with Richard Nanney (died 1767/8?), and then his son-in-law, Reverend Richard Ellis (MA) of Gwynfryn and Bodychen, also the vicar of Llanaelhaearn. Ellis married Nanney's daughter Catherine. Their son David Ellis (1st baronet's great-uncle) had inherited the estate on the terms of his uncle's will, the inheritance stipulated changing his surname to Ellis Nanney. This marriage is the first of the inter-marriage between the families of Gwynfryn and Cefndeuddwr:

- Richard Nanney (H. S. M.) of Cefndeuddwr c. 1679
  - Robert Nanney (died 1718).
    - Richard Nanney (1691–1767).
      - Catherine Nanney (8 November 1736 – 24 August 1803)
        = (1 August 1757) Richard Ellis of Gwynfryn (1730 – 1 December 1805).
        - David Ellis Nanney (1759 – 5 June 1819).
        - Elizabeth (buried 21 March 1801)
          - Major Owen Jones Ellis-Nanney (1790–1870).
            - Sir Hugh John Ellis-Nanney, 1st Baronet of Gwynfryn and Cefndeuddwr.

== Ellis-Nanney Baronet of Gwynfryn and Cefndeuddwr (1898) ==
- Sir Hugh Ellis-Nanney (1845–1920)

The heir would have been Owen Gerald Ellis-Nanney, born 1879, but he died before the baronetcy in 1887.

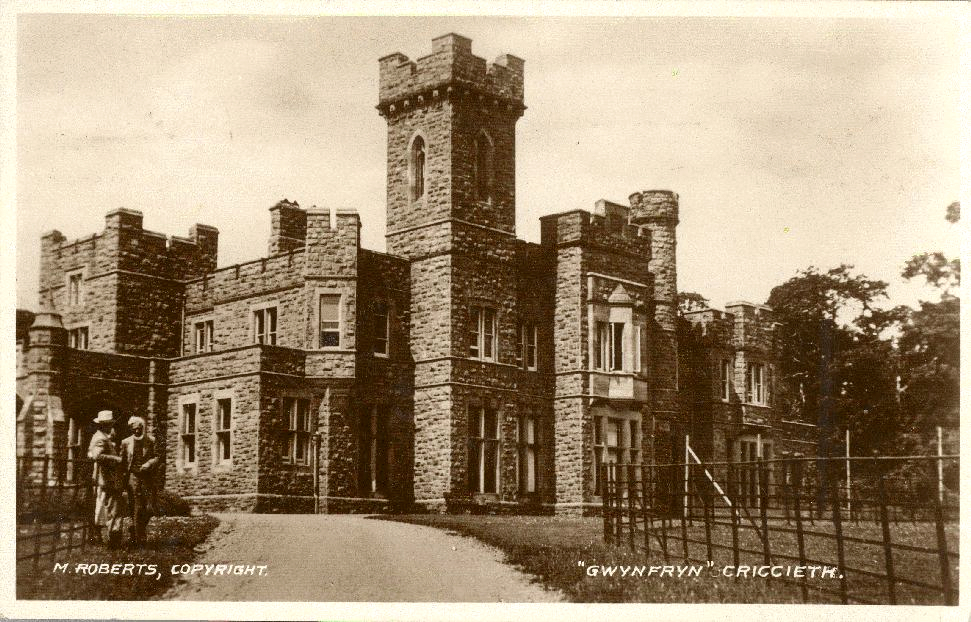
Plas Gwynfryn mansion, B&W image.

Baronetage of the United Kingdom
New creation	Baronet (of Gwynfryn and Cefndeuddwr); 1898–1920	Extinct
Preceded by Wilks baronets	Ellis-Nanney baronets of Gwynfryn and Cefndeuddwr; 7 March 1898	Succeeded by Wigan baronets
