= Wigan baronets =

Baronetcy in the Baronetage of the United Kingdom

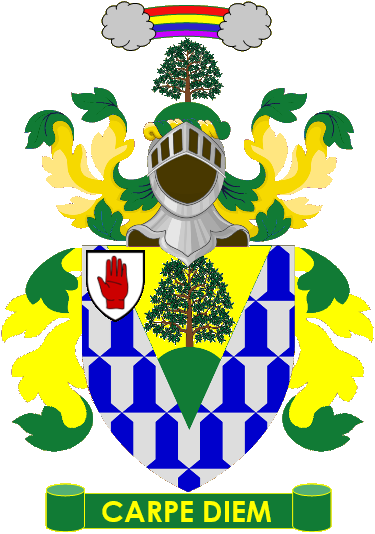
- Crest: On a mount Vert a mountain ash tree surmounted by a rainbow all Proper.
- Shield: Vair on a pile Or a mount in base Vert thereon a mountain ash tree Proper.
- Motto: Carpe Diem

The Wigan baronetcy, of Clare Lawn in Mortlake in the County of Surrey and Purland Chase in Ross in the County of Hereford, is a title in the Baronetage of the United Kingdom. It was created on 9 March 1898 for Frederick Wigan, a Director of the North London Railway.

== Wigan baronets, of Clare Lawn and Purland Chase (1898) ==
- Sir Frederick Wigan, 1st Baronet (1827–1907)
- Sir Frederick William Wigan, 2nd Baronet (1859–1907)
- Sir Roderick Grey Wigan, 3rd Baronet (1886–1954)
- Sir Frederick Adair Wigan, 4th Baronet (1911–1979)
- Sir Alan Lewis Wigan, 5th Baronet (1913–1996)
- Sir Michael Iain Wigan, 6th Baronet (presumed) (born 1951)

The heir apparent is the present holder's son, Fergus Adam Wigan (born 1990).

Baronetage of the United Kingdom
| New creation | Baronet (of Gwynfryn and Cefndeuddwr); 1898–1920 | Extinct |
| Preceded by Ellis-Nanney baronets | Wigan baronets of Clare Lawn and Purland Chase; 9 March 1898 | Succeeded by Durning-Lawrence baronets |
