= Hugh Ellis-Nanney =

Welsh Baronet landowner, magistrate, political candidate

Sir Hugh John Ellis-Nanney, 1st Baronet, DL, JP (16 February 1845 – 7 June 1920) was a Welsh landowner, magistrate and political candidate.

During his lifetime, Ellis-Nanney gained wealth and stature residing in North Wales, UK. He was granted the title of Baronet Ellis-Nanney of Gwynfryn and Cefndeuddwr in the year 1898. Ellis-Nanney was a landowner and had accumulated land and wealth through inheritance. The baronet invested in property which enabled him to build a new mansion called Gwynfryn, near Llanystumdwy. Ellis-Nanney was made a sheriff and had also become a justice of the peace in Caernarvonshire. Prior to becoming a baronet he stood in local elections.

== Personal life ==
Hugh Ellis-Nanney was born in 1845. His father, Owen Jones Ellis-Nanney was 53 when Owen married Hugh's mother, Mary Jones (d. 8 July 1849) in 1843, she was 23 years old. Mary was the daughter of Hugh Jones of Hengwrt-Uchaf in North Wales. Owen Jones (Ellis-Nanney), The Old Major, Lord of the manor of Gwynfryn (1790 – 1870) inherited the Ellis-Nanney estate from his uncle on the condition he also assumed a double-barrelled surname. David Ellis (Nanney), Owen's uncle (childless) married Henrietta Watts, daughter of Rev. Watts of Uffington, Oxfordshire. David was the attorney general for North Wales.

Owen Ellis-Nanney was a contemporary on personal terms with Barons and political candidates in the North Wales constituencies, including politicians such as Thomas Wynn, 1st Baron Newborough of Glynllifon, Charles Griffith-Wynne and Sir Robert Williams, 9th Baronet. Owen Ellis-Nanney was a Conservative party politician who briefly held the seat of the Caernarfon constituency in 1833 against Charles Paget (son of the Baronet of Plas Newydd, Anglesey). Owen then lost to Love Jones-Parry in the 1835 general election.

Hugh Ellis-Nanney was a graduate of Eton College and then completed his university studies at the University of Oxford in England. Returning to Wales, he served as a Justice of the Peace for Carnarvonshire and Merionethshire and a Deputy Lieutenant of Carnarvonshire. He also served as High Sheriff of Caernarvonshire during 1870, and as the High Sheriff of Merionethshire in 1877.

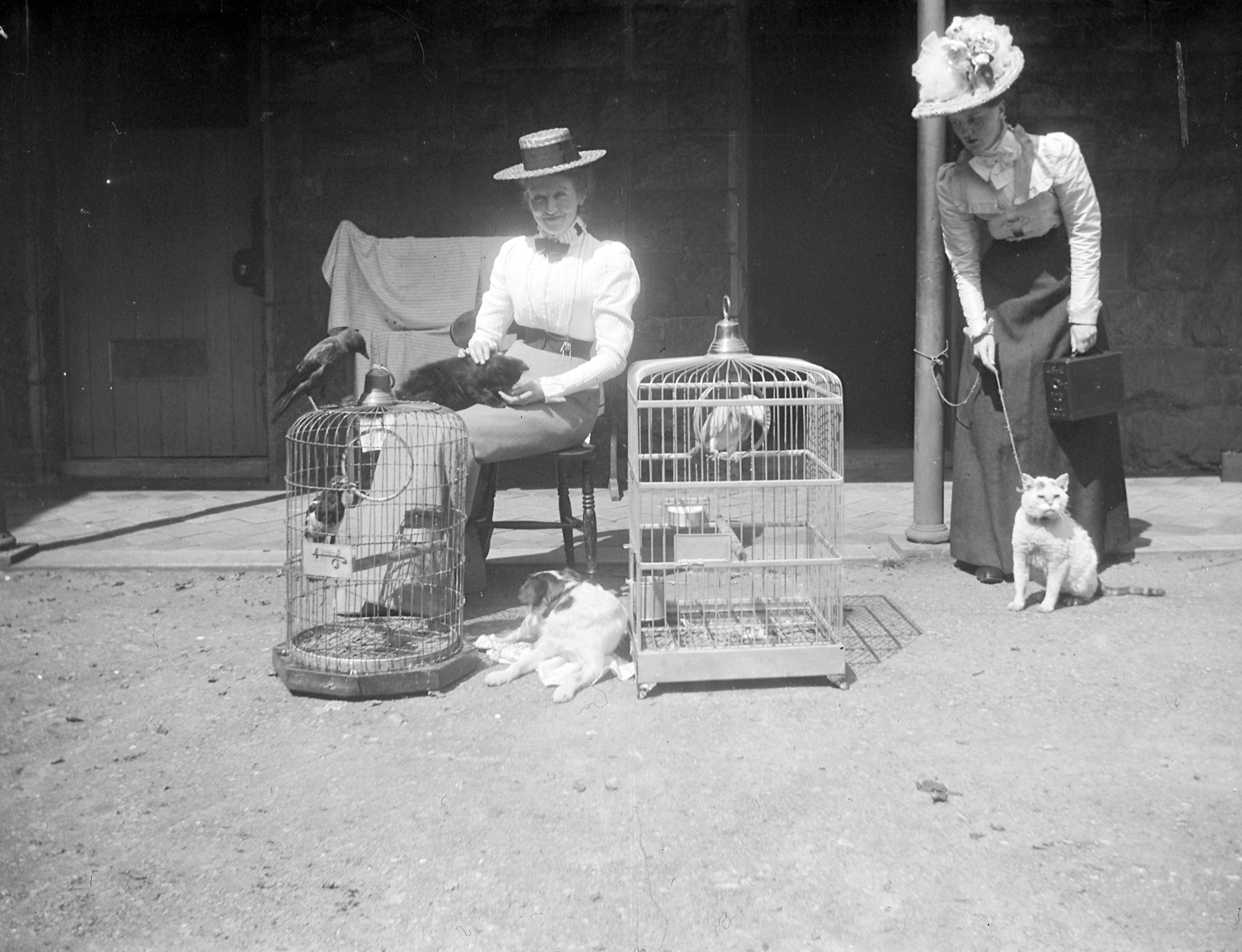
Mary Elizabeth Ellis-Nanney on the left

Hugh Ellis-Nanney married the honorary Elizabeth Octavia Dillon, youngest daughter of Robert Dillon, 3rd Baron Clonbrock of Clonbrock Castle, County Galway, Ireland, on 13 January 1875. They had two children, daughter Mary Elizabeth (1877 – 1947) and son Owen Gerald (born 1879, died 1887 in Bournemouth). Hugh was a member of the Carlton Club in London.

== Politics ==
Ellis-Nanney stood unsuccessfully for the Conservative party (Tory) in the former Welsh, UK parliamentary constituency of Caernarfon. He lost in the 1880 Caernarvonshire by-election to William Rathbone VI. And in the Eifion constituency against John Bryn Roberts for 1885 general election, then also the 1890 Caernarvon Boroughs by-election, and 1895 general election. He was defeated in his four local elections, the final two times by the future Prime Minister of the United Kingdom, David Lloyd George, losing by only 18 votes out of a total of almost 4,000 in the 1890 by-election.

== Baronetcy ==
On March 7, 1898, Hugh Ellis-Nanney was given a royal title, Ellis-Nanney baronets of Gwynfryn and Cefndeuddwr. The baronetcy was conferred by Queen Victoria from the 1897 Diamond Jubilee Honours for the monarch's Diamond Jubliee celebrations in London. Upon the return to Criccieth, the newly created Baronet and his wife had a meeting to commemorate the occasion with the most prominent people in the area.

The title represented his ancestral manors (Welsh: Plas) Gwynfryn in the parish of Llanystumdwy of the County of Caernarvon and Cefndeuddwr in the parish of Trawsfynydd of the County of Merioneth. The two towns of Llanystumdwy and Trawsfynydd lie in what is now Dwyfor Meirionnydd (UK Parliament constituency), Wales, UK.

== Plas Gwynfryn ==
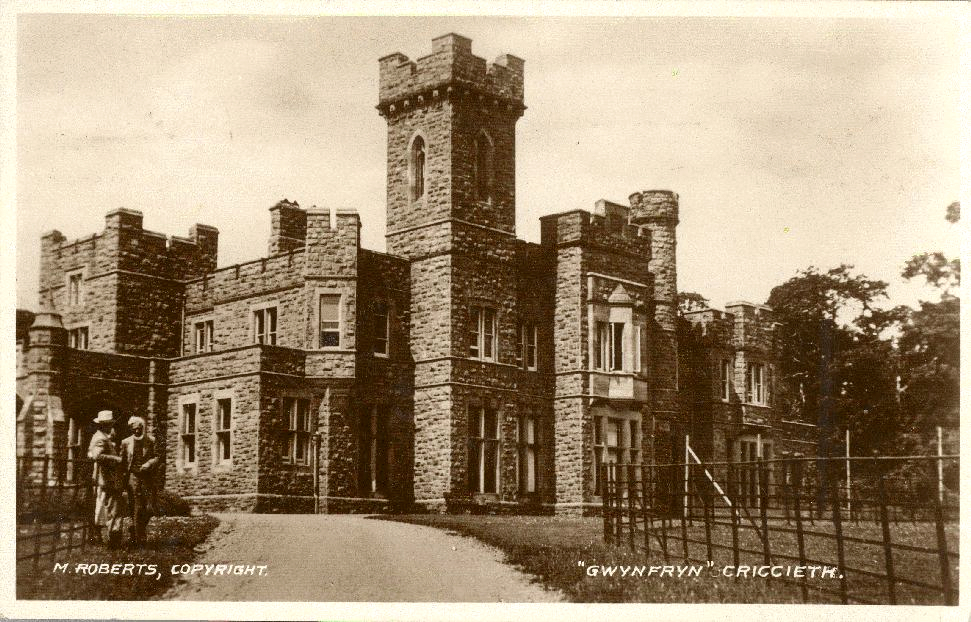
Plas Gwynfryn, Criccieth

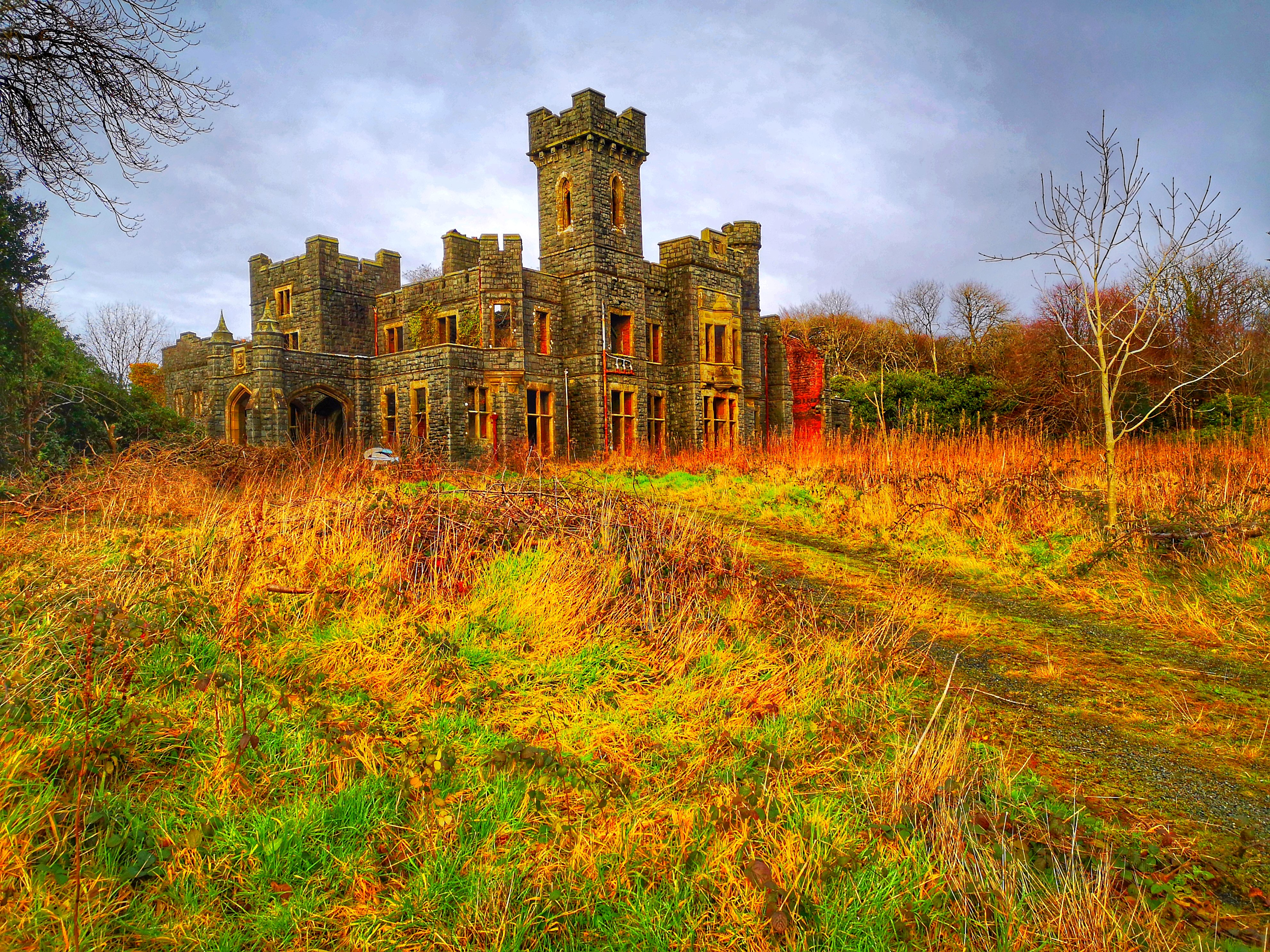
The ruins of Plas Gwynfryn

Near Criccieth in Gwynedd are the ruins of Plas Gwynfryn, a 19th-century "stone mansion with castellated towers and turrets and stone-mullioned windows" mansion built by Hugh Ellis-Nanney. He had demolished his existing manor house (c. 16th century) and rebuilt a new family residence c. 1870s. The location of Gwynfryn is on the Llŷn Peninsula overlooking Wales' highest mountain range, Snowdonia (Eryri) with views of Cadair Idris, and also to the south, Cardigan Bay. The land was a 12,072-acre estate in 1873, and the annual rental income was £5,814. Designed by George Williams from London, the mansion was constructed over 10 years between 1866 and 1876, its total cost was £70,000 (equivalent to £7,000,000 in 2025). The mansion was featured in the June edition of The Builder magazine in 1877.

The former residence became a hospital during the World War, then later used as an orphanage, and finally sold to become a hotel. The mansion was devastated by a fire in 1982 and again in 2014. As of 2011, the former house was classified by Save Britain's Heritage who said it is at risk of being lost.

The former Grade II castellated mansion was put up for sale in 2019 with an asking price of £500,000. However, it would take £1.5m to restore. Although a ruin it still has original features such as its porte-cochere, and stone mullioned and transom windows. As of 2020, a property group has explored renovating the derelict mansion into 25-30 apartments. Since February 2021, a professional member of Royal Institution of Chartered Surveyors working in coordination with the Welsh Government, Cadw and Coflein made a proposition for a renovation and conversion to turn Plas Gwynfryn into apartments, similar to Blencowe Hall in Cumbria, which also features a collapsed tower, now with an inserted glazed structure.

The name 'Plas Gwynfryn' was taken from the Welsh language, an ancient Celtic language of the Welsh people. 'Gwynfryn' is also a Welsh boy's name which translates as 'White Hill', or 'happy hill', while 'Plas' translates as 'Mansion'.

== Criccieth - the Promenade ==
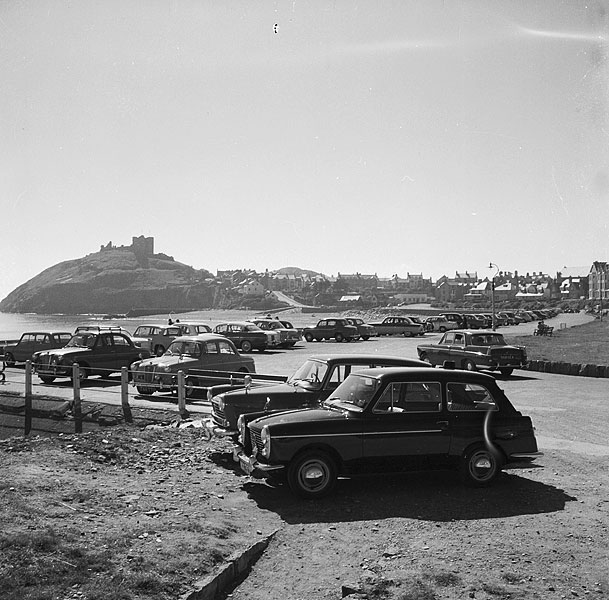
Criccieth promenade B&W

The east side of the town was developed by the Ellis-Nanney family during the Victorian era. With private funding, a promenade was constructed in 1888, with plans for 25 homes on the surrounding land. The promenade/esplanade was built with 4 homes designed and constructed by George Leedham Fuller. However, during the first winter, the sea wall didn't protect the land, the homes were flooded and no more homes were constructed. The homes were demolished in 1925. The land was eventually donated to the community by Hugh's daughter Mrs. Lewis. The promenade remains a popular destination for walks to this day.

== Death and estate ==
Hugh John Ellis-Nanney died on 7 June 1920. After the baronet's death, his personal properties of Gwynfryn, Talhenbont (Plas Hen), and Brynhir were left to his only surviving child, his daughter, Mary Elizabeth Lewis. Mary had married the Reverend John Price Lewis (M.A.) in 1913. Reverend Lewis was the rector of Llanystumdwy. Lewis had lived in her ancestral home of Plas Hen, now called Talhenbont hall. The mansion today is located to the northeast of its local village, Chwilog, that's within the Llanystumdwy community. The Ellis-Nanney, Gwynfryn, and Cefndeuddwr estates were broken up and sold to their property tenants in 1959.

The local family church was St. John the Baptist Churchyard, Llanystumdwy, which is where the Ellis-Nanneys were buried from the 19th century onwards.

Baronetage of the United Kingdom
New creation	Baronet (of Gwynfryn and Cefndeuddwr); 1898–1920	Extinct
