= Talhenbont Hall =

Welsh mansion in Gwynedd

Talhenbont
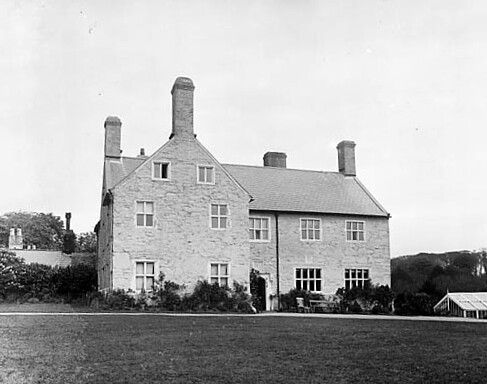
- Talhenbont Hall in 1896

- Location within Gwynedd
- 52.9316°N 4.2907°W
- Type: Mansion
- Location: Llanystumdwy, Gwynedd, Wales, UK

History
- Built: 1607

Site notes
- Area: North Wales
- Website: talhenbonthall.co.uk

Listed Building – Grade II
- Designated: 19 January 1952
- Reference no.: 4218

Talhenbont Hall (Welsh: Neuadd Talhenbont) is a Grade II listed building on a 100-acre (40 ha) estate in Gwynedd, Wales. Until it was renamed in the 19th or 20th century, the building was known as Plas Hen (Welsh for 'Old Hall').

The mansion was once part of the former estates of the Vaughan of Corsygedol family. The Vaughan family residences were inherited through marriage to the Mostyn baronets in the 18th century. In 1845, the Hall and estate were purchased by the Ellis-Nanney family. Nearby villages include Llanystumdwy to the southeast and Chwilog to the west. The Hall was originally constructed in 1607 and was further expanded in the 18th and 19th centuries. As of 2016, Talhenbont Hall has been developed as a wedding venue and its outbuildings converted into holiday cottages.

The Vaughan (Welsh: Fychan) family of Talhenbont are descendants of one of the medieval Fifteen Tribes of Wales. The first century of the Hall was turbulent because of the English Civil War. The Parliamentarian New Model Army seized the mansion, but it was later taken by the opposite side, the Royalists under John Owen, who used it as his headquarters. Owen's daughter married into the Vaughan family of Talhenbont. The Vaughan estate was once part of the largest estate in North Wales, and the same family owned the current Hall for over 200 years until it was sold in 1845. There have been several owners since.

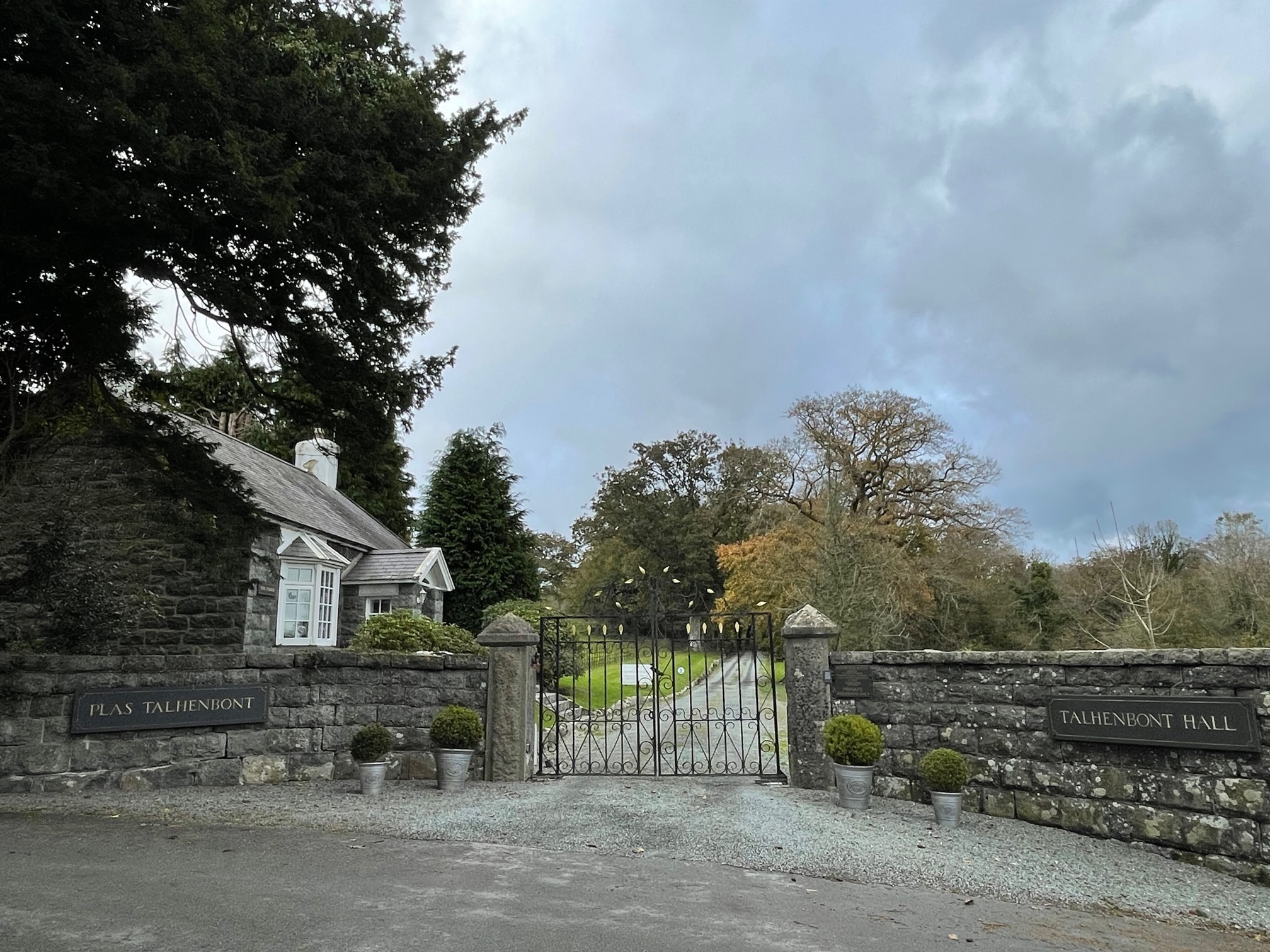
The gates to enter the private estate of Talhenbont Hall.

== Plas Hen family beginnings ==
The family of Plas Hen (today named Talhenbont) descended from Collwyn ap Tangno (c.1000 – 1050), Lord of Ardudwy and Eifionydd, founder of the 5th of the Fifteen Tribes of Wales, c. 1137. Around 1416, the family settled in the area. Madog ap Ifan ap Einion of Ystumllyn, Criccieth, grandson of Ynyr Fychan (Lord of Plas Nannau) married the daughter of Rhys ap Tudur (Tudors of Penmynydd). Madog's grandson married an heiress of Trefan, and the property along with Plas Hen (Talhenbont) was passed from Gruffydd ap John ap Grono to their son Gruffudd ap Robert Fychan (Vaughan), who married Elizabeth of Ystumcegid and had a large family c. 1541. The property then passed to Robert Vaughan, Fychan's grandson, and it was later inherited by Robert's brother Richard (Sheriff of Caernarvonshire, 1600) of the Vaughan of Corsygedol (Cors-Y-Gedol) family.

=== Plas Hen Hall ownership ===
==== Vaughan of Corsygedol ====
The mansion standing today was constructed in 1607 by William Vaughan (d. 1633) of the House of Corsygedol, a dynasty started in Merionethshire by the Irishman Osbwrn Wyddel around the 13th century. William's father first constructed Corsygedol in 1576, and the Hall was extended by William in 1592, a little more than a decade before he oversaw the reconstruction of Plas Hen (Talhenbont). He married and had children with Ann Vaughan (of a different Vaughan family), heiress of Richard Vaughan of Plas Hen, Sheriff of Caernarfonshire (1600). In 1642, during the English Civil War, the owner of Talhenbont Hall, William Lloyd (Sheriff of Caernarfonshire and Ann's second husband), was arrested as a Royalist sympathiser and the New Model Army seized the Hall. Later, the mansion was used as headquarters for the Royalist army under Sir John Owen of Clenennau. Their son Richard Vaughan of Plas Hen was MP for Merioneth. In 1628, he married Owen's daughter. After successive family member-owners up until 1758, Plas Hen (Talhenbont), owned by the Vaughan family, became the largest privately owned single piece of land in the Welsh area of Eifionydd, it was also the largest estate of multiple halls and surrounding countryside in different locations in North Wales.

==== Mostyn baronets ====
The last generation of Vaughan ownership began with William Vaughan (1707–1775), who attended Cambridge University. Vaughan was Custos rotulorum, and MP for Merioneth from 1734 for six parliaments until 1768. He married an heiress of the Nannau estate, Catherine Nanney, daughter of Colonel Huw Nanney, on 16 February 1733. The couple had one daughter, Anne Vaughan (1734–1767). He was buried at St Dwywe's Church, Llanddwywe. William had no male heirs, so the estate passed to his brother, Evan Lloyd Vaughan MP, the last male representative of Plas Hen. His niece Margaret, an heiress, married Sir Thomas Mostyn (6th Baronet Mostyn), and occupied the estate from 1796 onwards, as well as inheriting her estate of Corsygedol, Bodidris Hall, and Wynn family owned Bodysgallen Hall estate. Through her inheritance, the Halls passed to the family of the Mostyn baronets.

==== Ellis-Nanney baronets ====
Plas Hen was later the home of William Williams. In 1845, Talhenbont Hall and surrounding land was purchased by the Ellis-Nanney family from the Mostyn baronets for £50,000 (equivalent to £7 million in 2024). The Hall became part of the Ellis-Nanney's estate of over 12,000 acres (5,000 ha). They renamed it Talhenbont Hall from Plas Hen. In 1884, the estate was split to pay debts that had accumulated during the Napoleonic Wars. The former Ellis-Nanney baronets of Gwynfryn and Cefndeuddwr estate was further broken up and sold to its tenants in 1959.

== Plas Hen Hall ==
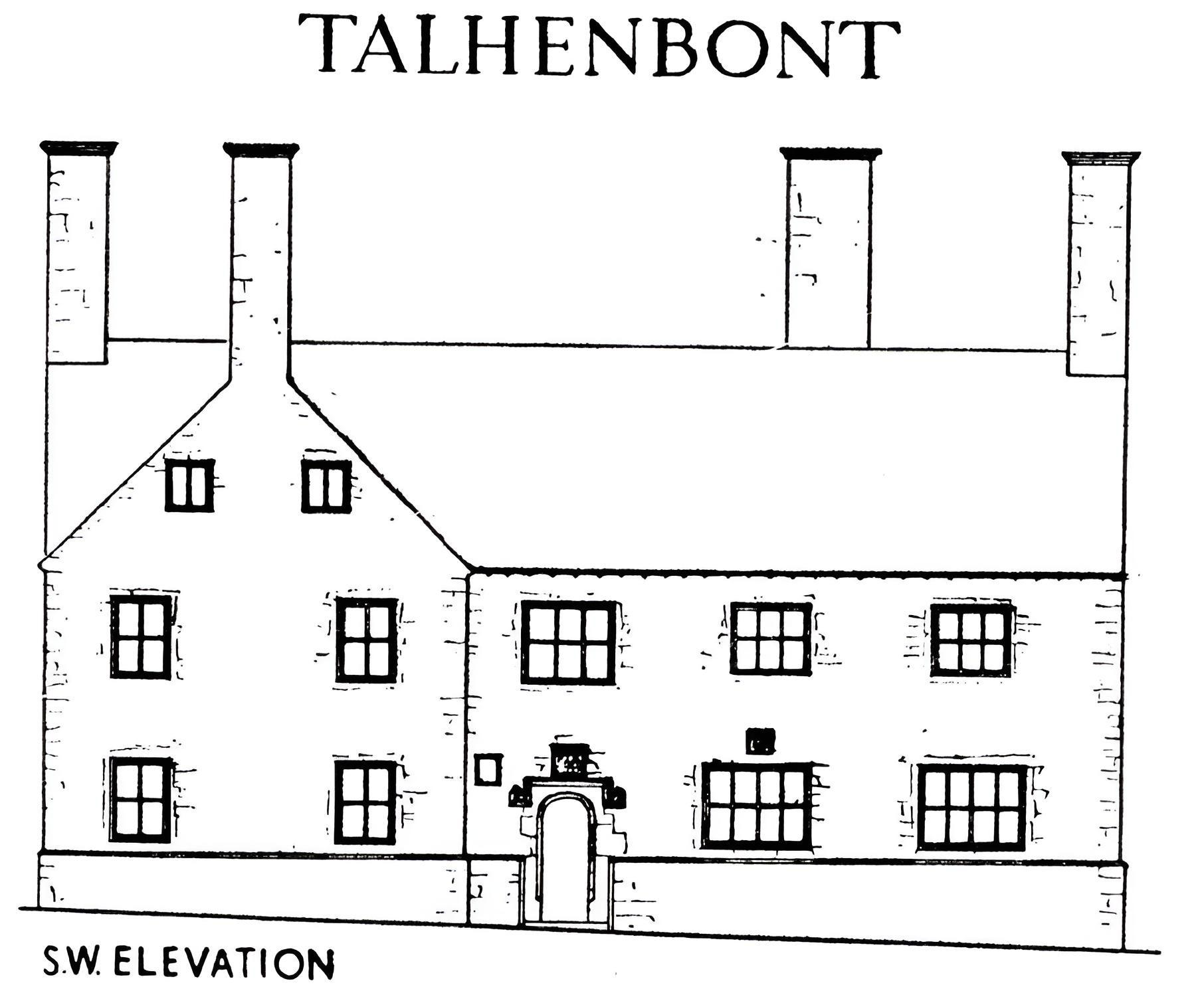
Drawing of Talhenbont hall

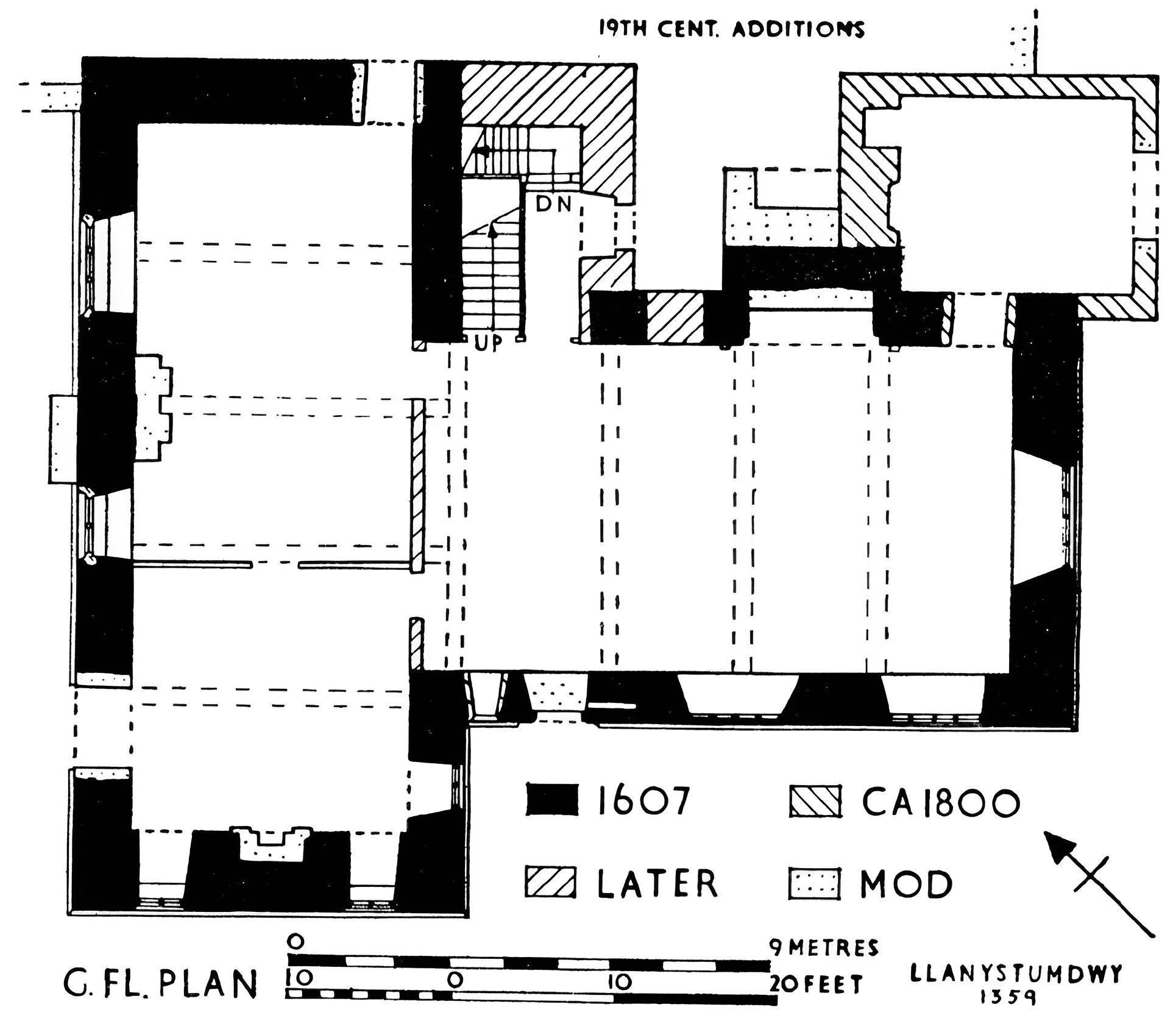
Floor plan of Talhenbont Hall

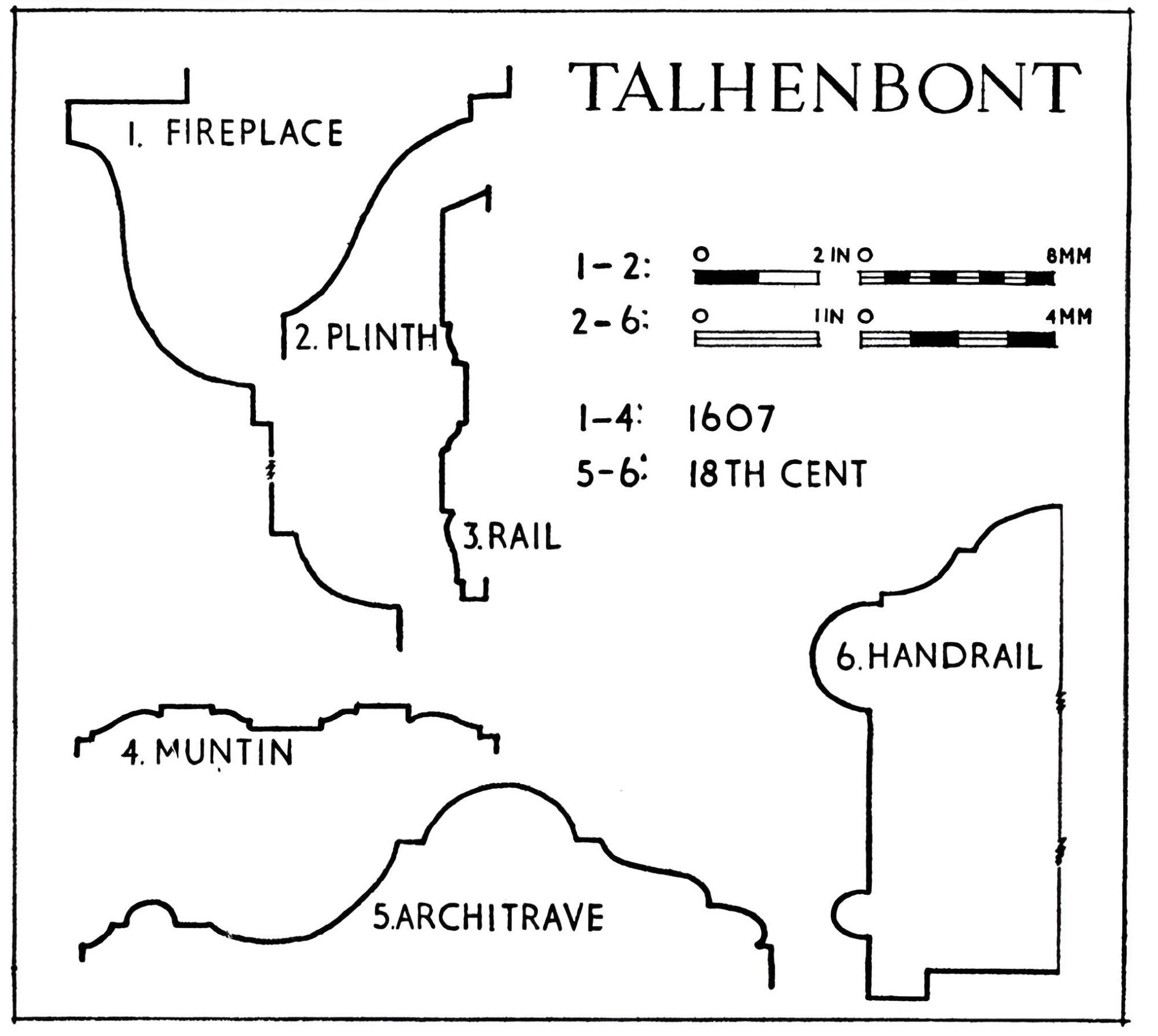
Details of interior

The original 17th-century mansion was named Plas Hen, and built in a T shape but this was altered to a W cross-wing home, with an addition in the northeast of the Hall of a gabled porch leading to the parlour and a service wing added by the 19th-century owner of the home. In the 17th century, entrance is restored oak panelling. Talhenbont's exterior is a two-storey home with an attic made of rubble stonework with ashlar cut stone walls as a slate-roofed house with slate tiled copings. The main building was also altered in the 18th century. The mansion also includes slate gabled roofs, fireplaces, and tall chimney stacks. The architect also installed stone ovolo-mullioned windows throughout. There is a large central gable in the wing and a visible difference where the terminal stack shows where the original Hall and the new additions were merged. Also, there are stone-bracketed eaves. To the east is a narrow wing that has been whitewashed with additions made to the hipped slate roof. Around the hall and wing is a plinth with an ogee moulding. Another ogee features over the original doorway on the southwest of the house of a Tudor arch with their family coat of arms above the door. The sculpted stone square tablet is inscribed; the initials WV, suggesting William Vaughan of Corsygedol, and the date of Talhenbont's construction in 1607. Then the quarterly of Collwyn ap Tangno (5/15 Tribes of Wales), Osborn Wyddel, four lions passant (Kingdom of Gwynedd), and Ednyfed Fychan with the initials AV, presumably Ann Vaughan of Plas Hen. Today, the hall is operated as a wedding venue.

Plas Hen family arms quarterly

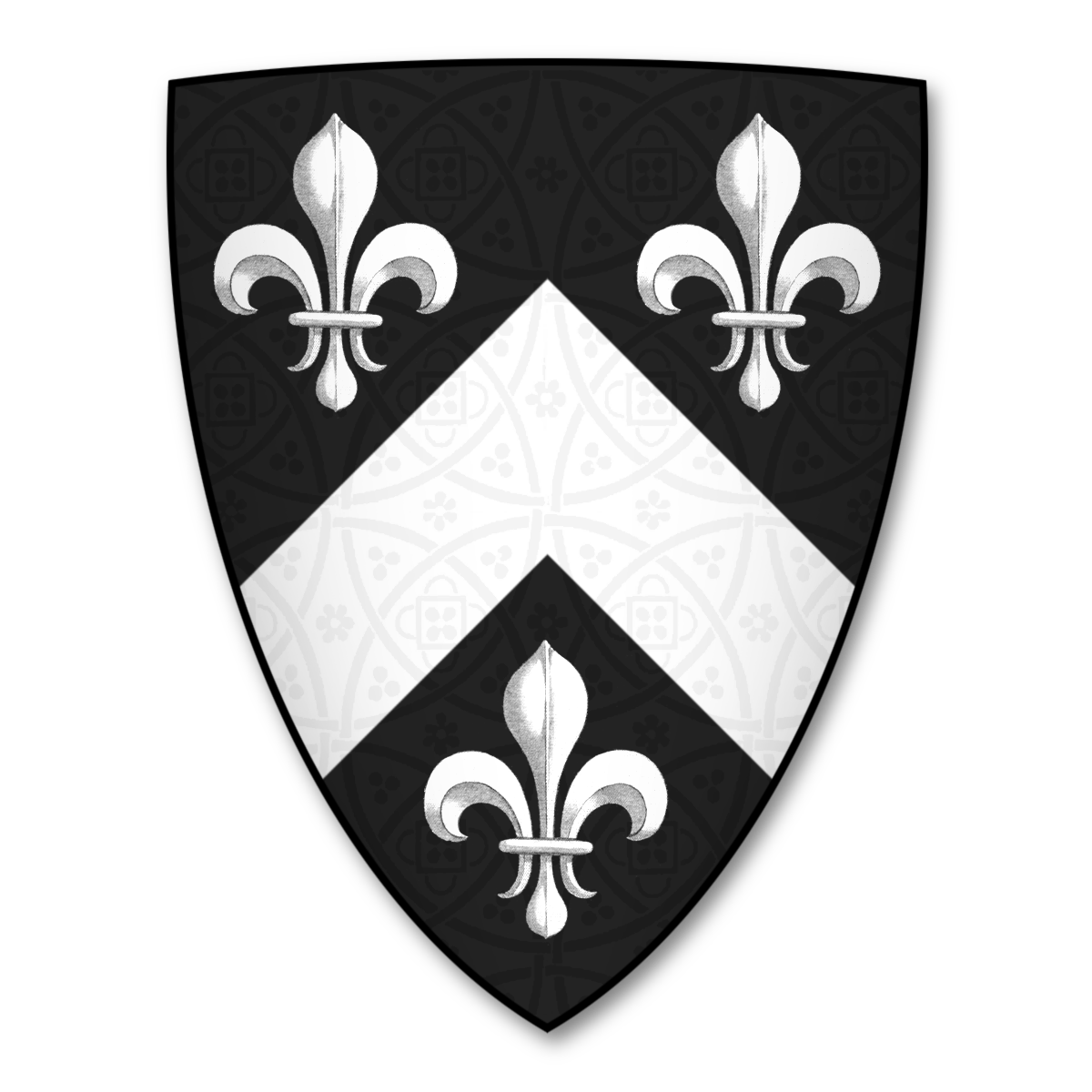
Coat of arms of Collwyn ap Tangno, Sable a chevron between three fleur de lis argent.

FitzGerald arms, similar to FitzGerald-Osbourne for Cors-y-gedol.

Four lions passant guardant, arms of Gwynedd.

Tudors of Penmynydd, Gules a chevron between three helmets argent.

The coat of arms on the north front bears the family motto:

Latin: Non Nobis Nati
We are not born for ourselves

=== Estate gardens and outbuildings ===
In addition to the Hall, the 100-acre estate has outbuildings that have been converted into accommodation for use as part of a hospitality venue. The estate has grounds including woodland, a bridge, an aqueduct, a terrace and a fountain. Before conversion into rental accommodation in the 1980s, the estate's cottages were used by farmworkers. There was an outbuilding that had been used as a pigsty, a stable with a round-headed doorway, and a southeast-facing coach house at the back of the house. The coach house included the grooms' quarters, in a single room with a chimney.

== In television ==
In 2011, Talhenbont Hall was the subject of an episode of the BBC One Hidden Houses series, presented by Laurence Llewelyn-Bowen.
