= Chwilog =

Village in Gwynedd, Wales

Coordinates: 52.919°N 4.330°W

- The B4354 running through Chwilog

- Location within Gwynedd
- Population: 640
- OS grid reference: SH433383
  - Cardiff: 156.72 mi
- Community: Llanystumdwy
- Principal area: Gwynedd
- Country: Wales
- Sovereign state: United Kingdom
- Post town: PWLLHELI
- Postcode district: LL53
- Dialling code: 01766
- Police: North Wales
- Fire: North Wales
- Ambulance: Welsh
- UK Parliament: Dwyfor Meirionnydd
- Senedd Cymru – Welsh Parliament: Gwynedd Maldwyn

Chwilog (Welsh pronunciation: [ˈχwiːlɔɡ]) is a village in Gwynedd, north Wales, and located on the Llŷn Peninsula. It is in the community of Llanystumdwy, near Criccieth, and in the medieval commote (Welsh: cwmwd) of Eifionydd, named after a 5th-century ruler. It is within the Dwyfor Meirionnydd constituency in the UK Parliament and in the Senedd (Welsh Parliament). The name means 'abounding in beetles' and was perhaps transferred from an earlier name of the river (or a part of it).

It had a population of 640 in 311 households as of the 2011 UK census, with 78% born in Wales. In the 2021 census of the UK, the Llanustumdwy community with a 60km sq radius, which includes Chwilog had a population of 1917 inhabitants.

== Village ==
The village is fairly linear, built up around the B4354 which used to be a turnpike/toll road crossing the peninsula to Porthdinllaen. The Afon Wen or its original name Afon Carrog flows through the lower part of the village on its way to the sea at Afonwen, less than 1 mile (1.6 km) away.

=== Y Lôn Goed ===
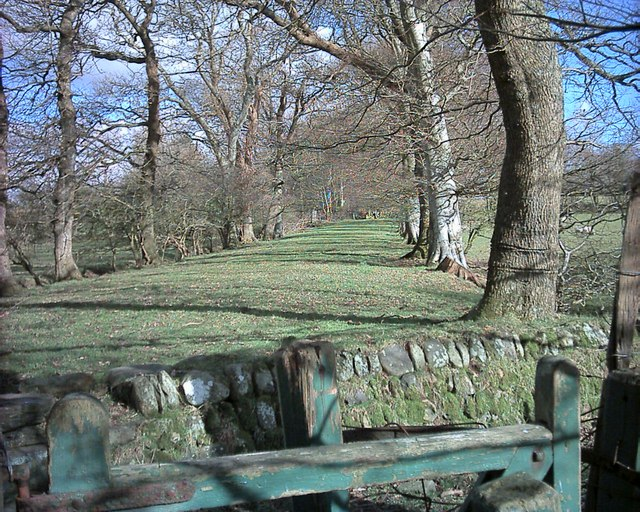
Y Lôn Goed

Nearby is Y Lôn Goed (English: Tree Lane) is a 7-mile tree-lined path. It was first nicknamed by the local population. It is a wide tree-lined avenue created in the 18th century for transporting lime, coal, and peat from the coast to the upland farms of Eifionydd, including Plas Hen locally. The track is no longer used for this purpose but is now popular with walkers.

== Local halls (Plas) ==
During the 16th century, a residence named Plas Chwilog was established in the vicinity. The family was descendants of Rhodri, son of King Owain Gwynedd (c. 12th century), and also the Powys Fadog dynasty (12th–15th centuries). The patriarch of Chwilog, Griffith Llwyd (Lloyd) was the son of Morris of Clenennau, Dolbenmaen. He founded the hall (plas) near the village of Llanystumdwy. A son of Llwyd married a descendant of Hywel Coetmor, he had sided with Prince Owain Glyndŵr during the early 1400's Welsh rebellion.

Near Chwilog is Talhenbont Hall, a manor house (plas) built in 1607, it is now a Grade II listed building. The property, formerly named Plas Hen, was inherited in 1870 by the future Baronet Hugh Ellis-Nanney of Gwynfryn and Cefndeuddwr. He became the owner of a 12,000 acre estate in North Wales surrounding Chwilog. As well as the Talhenbont residence, he owned the homes near Criccieth. Ellis-Nanney also inherited Bryn Hir and rebuilt the mansion Plas Gwynfryn before 1876.

== Amenities ==
Chwilog Primary School was opened in 1908 by Margaret Lloyd George, wife of David Lloyd George. The village was built around the railway station on the Caernarfonshire Railway Line situated at the centre of the village, it opened in 1867 and has been disused since December 1964. Local businesses include a butcher's shop, and also a village pub. The Madryn Arms (est. 1868) had permanently closed in 2019 and has since been reopened as of 2021 by 5 locals. There are 2 bus routes travelling through Chwilog in Gwynedd. There is also a tractor sales outlet.

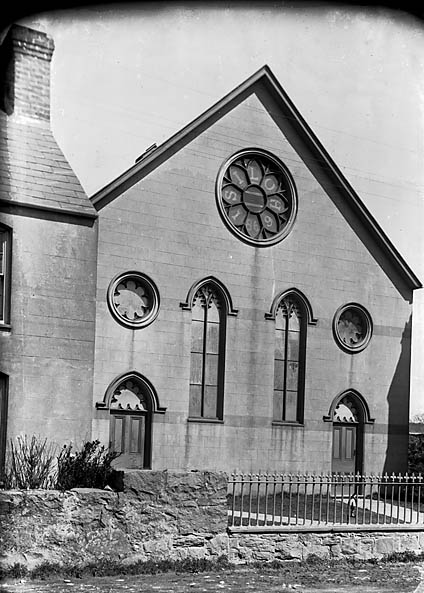
Capel Siloh 19th century

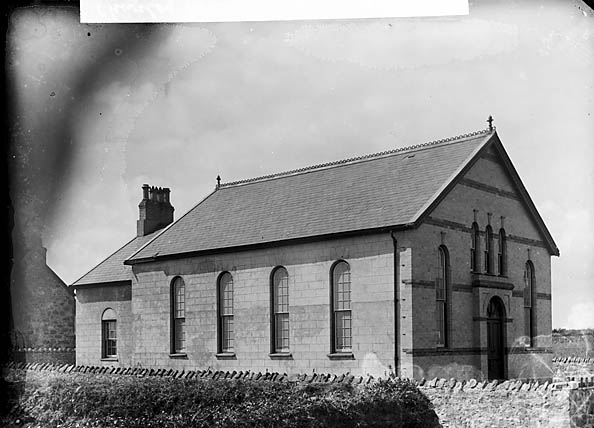
Capel Uchaf, Chwilog c. 1885

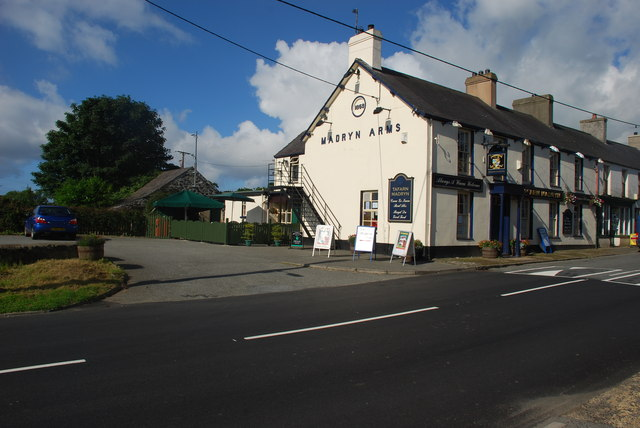
Madryn Arms pub, Chwilog.

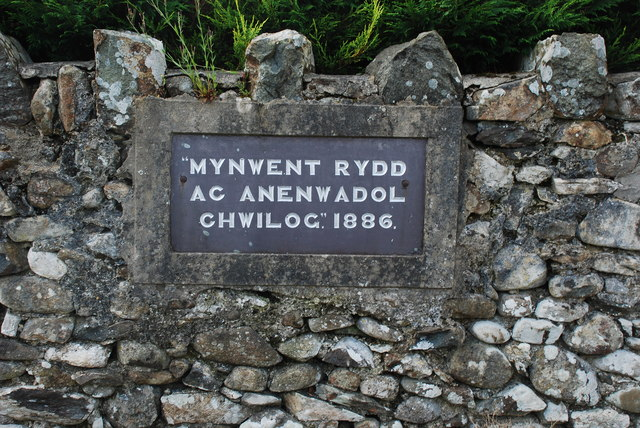
Free cemetery, Chwilog.

There are two chapels in Chwilog, Capel Siloh, built in 1869 and altered in 1897. Also Capel Uchaf, the chapel is part of the west Gwynedd Presbytery of the Presbyterian Church of Wales. As well as the chapels, there is also a free cemetery in Chwilog which served World War I military personnel.
