= Sir Frederick Wigan, 1st Baronet =

Victorian businessman

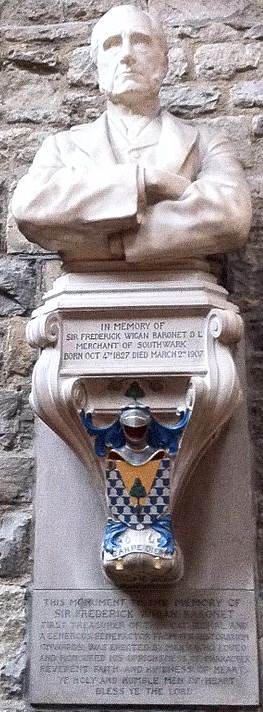
Monument to Sir Frederick Wigan, 1st Baronet in Southwark Cathedral, showing arms of Wigan: Vair, on a pile or a mount in base vert thereon a mountain ash tree proper

Sir Frederick Wigan, 1st Baronet, J.P., D.L (4 October 1827 – 2 March 1907) of Clare Lawn in Mortlake, Surrey and of Purland Chase in Ross, Herefordshire, was a hops merchant based at Southwark, in Surrey, near the south end of London Bridge. He was also a director of the North London Railway and had business interests in several water supply companies and in the brewers Samuel Allsopp & Sons Bass, Ratcliff and Gretton and Worthington and Co. He was also a collector of orchids.

Wigan was born in East Malling, Kent, the son of a hop merchant. He married Mary Harriet Blunt at Mortlake in April 1857 and the couple had ten children. He was appointed High Sheriff of Surrey in 1894 and knighted that year. In 1898, he was made a baronet.

Wigan became a member of the St Saviour's Collegiate Church restoration committee 1890, which oversaw the rebuilding of the nave by the architect, Arthur Blomfield. He donated two carved oak screens, designed by Blomfield, as well as two windows by Charles Eamer Kempe to the church. In 1905, the building became Southwark Cathedral and Wigan was appointed Treasurer of the chapter. The year after his death, a sculpted bust was installed in the south transept. A chalice and paten were presented to the cathedral in Wigan's memory by his niece in 1910.

Sir Frederick was succeeded as baronet by his son, Frederick William Wigan, who died at his home, Windlesham Court, on 6 April 1907, just over a month later.

Baronetage of the United Kingdom
| New creation | Baronet (of Clare Lawn and Purland Chase); 1898–1907 | Succeeded by Frederick William Wigan |
