= Llanarmon, Gwynedd =

Coordinates: 52.928°N 4.347°W

Llanarmon
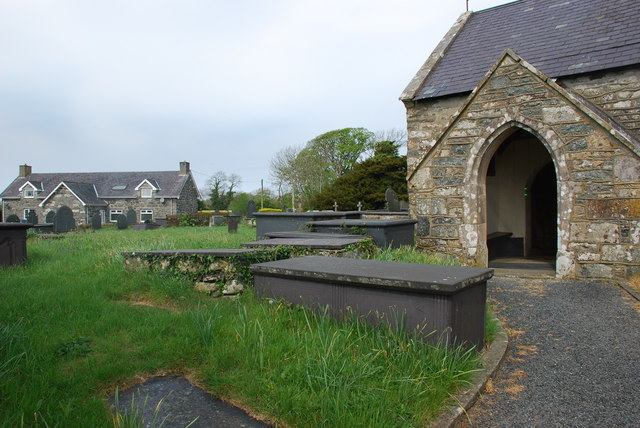
- Llanarmon Church

- Location within Gwynedd
- OS grid reference: SH422393
- Community: Llanystumdwy
- Principal area: Gwynedd
- Preserved county: Gwynedd
- Country: Wales
- Sovereign state: United Kingdom
- Post town: PWLLHELI
- Postcode district: LL53
- Dialling code: 01766
- Police: North Wales
- Fire: North Wales
- Ambulance: Welsh
- UK Parliament: Dwyfor Meirionnydd
- Senedd Cymru – Welsh Parliament: Dwyfor Meirionnydd

Llanarmon (Welsh for 'Garmon's Church') is a small village and former civil parish in the old commote of Eifionydd and Cantref Dunoding in the Welsh county of Gwynedd. The parish was abolished in 1934 and incorporated into Llanystumdwy. The village lies 4 miles (6.4 km) north east of Pwllheli and is close to the village of Llangybi, a holy well and the mountain of Carn Pentrych. A well-preserved 15th-century manor house at Penarth Fawr is maintained by Cadw, and another ancient monument Plas Du (Welsh: Black Place) is a well-preserved, substantial sub-medieval gentry house. It also has important historical associations; it was known as the centre of the Roman Catholic faith in the region and was the home of Thomas Owen, High Sheriff of Caernarfonshire from 1569, who was imprisoned for sheltering missionary priests in the house in 1571.

"The village is pleasantly situated in a fertile plain, and the neighbour-hood partakes of the pleasing scenery which prevails in this part of the country. The living is a rectory not in charge, annexed to that of Llangybi, in the archdeaconry of Merioneth, and diocese of Bangor, and in the patronage of the Bishop of Bangor. The church, dedicated to Saint Garmon, is an ancient and spacious structure in good repair : some additional windows have lately been inserted, previously to which alteration the interior was very dark."

Samuel Lewis, Topographical Dictionary of Wales (1833)
