= Richard Vaughan (of Corsygedol) =

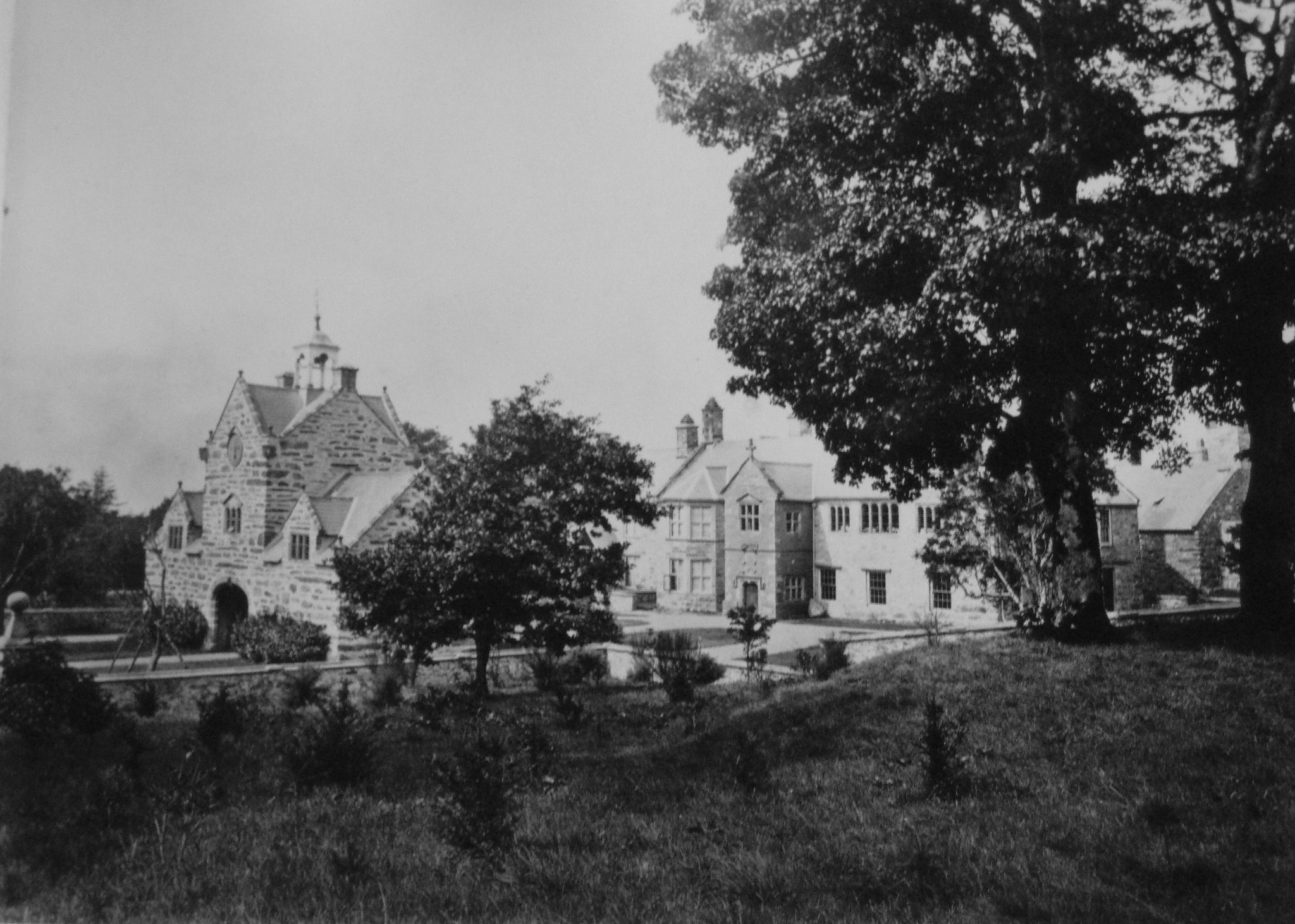
Plas Cors y Gedol, Wales, frontage

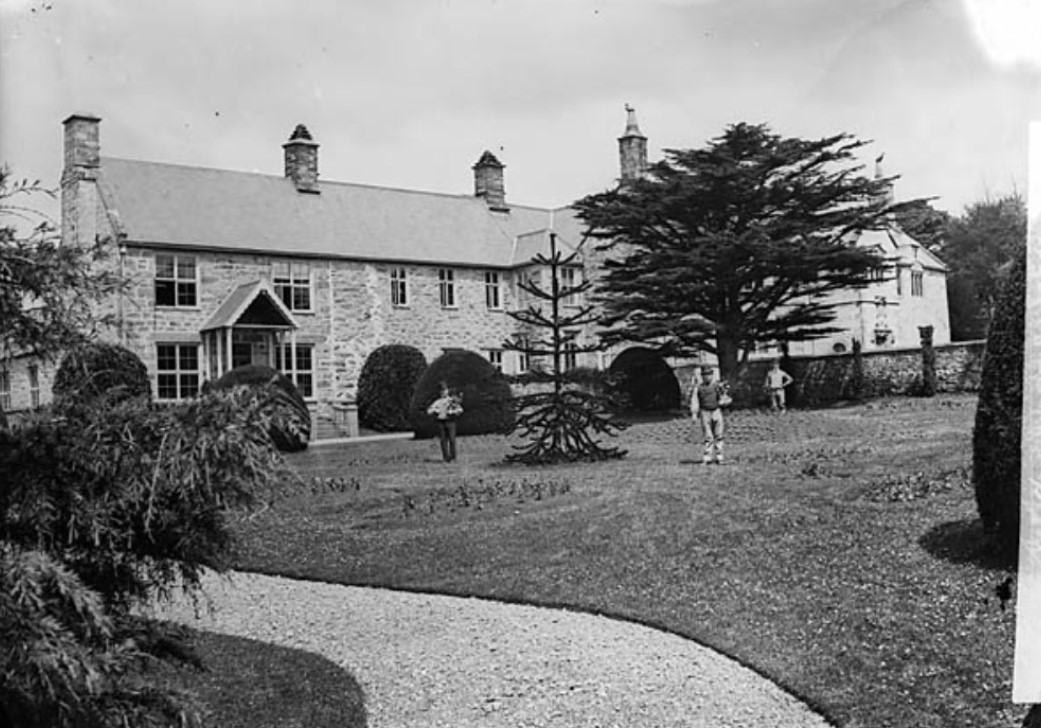
Left frontage of Corsygedol Hall, Llanddwywe-is-y-graig, ca. 1875

Richard Vaughan (by 1606 – 19 July 1636) was a Welsh politician who sat in the House of Commons from 1628 to 1629.

Vaughan was the son of William Vaughan of Plas Hen and his wife Ann, daughter and heir of Richard Vaughan of Talhenbont, Llanystumdwy, Caernarfonshire. In 1628, he was elected Member of Parliament for Merioneth and sat until 1629 when King Charles decided to rule without parliament for eleven years.

Vaughan was so corpulent and bulky that it was necessary to open the large door of the House of Commons to let him in "which was seldom opened except when the Usher of the Black Rod summoned the members to appear before the House of Lords. When the door was opened the Lords used to whisper that Black Rod or the Welsh Mayor was coming."

Vaughan died at Corsygedol in 1636 of complications of an operation to reduce his girth. He was aged about 30 at the time and had been serving as Sheriff of Merioneth. He had married, by a settlement dated 12 April 1616, Elizabeth Owen, daughter of Sir John Owen of Clenennau and Brogyntyn. The couple had a son, William, and a daughter, with Elizabeth dying sometime before 25 October 1641. William died relatively young in 1669, with one of his sons, Richard representing Merioneth in 1702.

== Bibliography ==
- Vaughan Family of Corsygedol in Dictionary of Welsh Biography

Parliament of England
Preceded by Edward Vaughan	Member of Parliament for Merioneth; 1628–1629	Parliament suspended until 1640
