= Diphwys Casson quarry =

Former slate mine

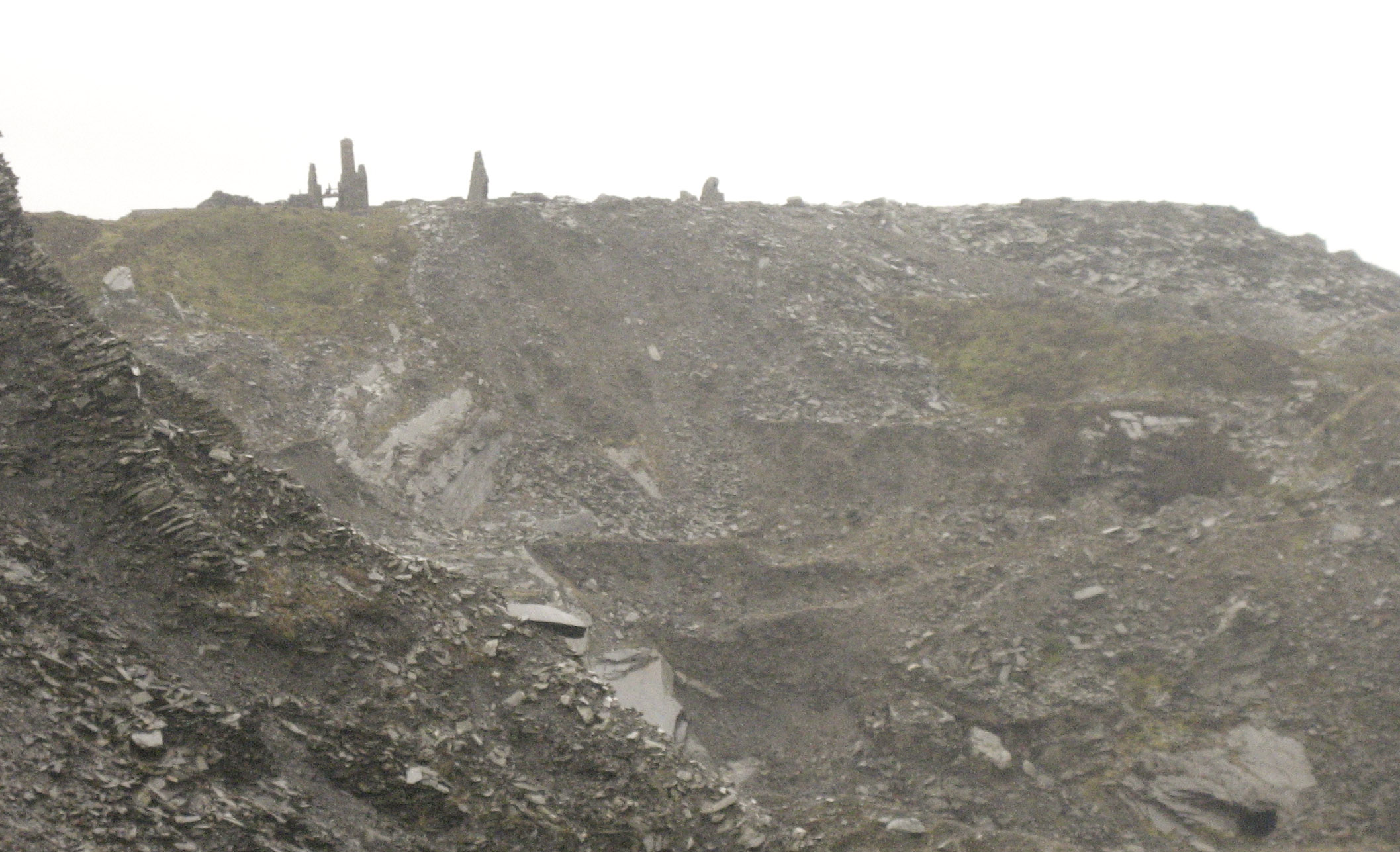
- The remains of the main Diphwys Casson mill

- Location in Gwynedd
- Location: Blaenau Ffestiniog, Gwynedd, Wales; 52.998°N 3.916°W grid reference SH7142946270
- Products: Slate
- Type: Quarry
- Discovered: 1760s
- Opened: 1800
- Active: 1800-1890; 1920-1927
- Closed: 1955

Diphwys Casson quarry (sometimes known as Diphwys quarry or Diffwys quarry) was a major slate quarry in the town of Blaenau Ffestiniog, Gwynedd, North Wales. It was one of the major users of the Ffestiniog Railway.

== History ==
To the north east of the town of Blaenau Ffestiniog is the valley of Ceunant y Diphwys. In the 1760s men led by Methusalem Jones, from the long established Cilgwyn quarry near Nantlle started quarrying in this area, which was known for its slate beds. The exact location of this original quarry has been obliterated by subsequent mining activity, but it is likely that it was part of what became Diphwys Casson. In 1800 quarry managers William Turne, Thomas Wright, Hugh Jones and Thomas Asseston Smith were involved with the quarry, and also William Casson from the Lake District borrowed his name to the lease on the quarry. They substantially expanded the workings. By 1820, underground mining had started.

The quarry was successful in the period 1820–1880, but it ran into difficulties and production ceased in 1890. Working restarted in 1920, but this lasted only seven years before the quarry was again abandoned.

Diphwys Casson closed in 1955 after almost two centuries of operation.

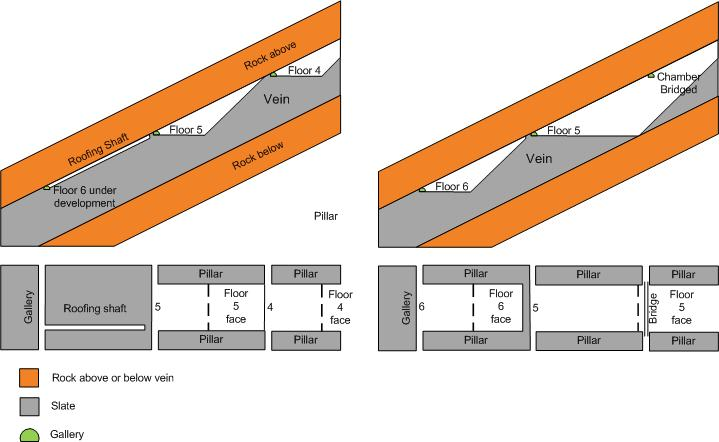
Method used for underground slate quarrying in the Blaenau Ffestiniog region

== Transport ==
In 1864 the Diffwys Incline was laid, connecting the quarry with the Ffestiniog Railway's Duffws terminus in Blaenau Ffestiniog. This incline operated by Rhiwbach Tramway was also used by the Votty & Bowydd Quarry.
