= Betws Bach =

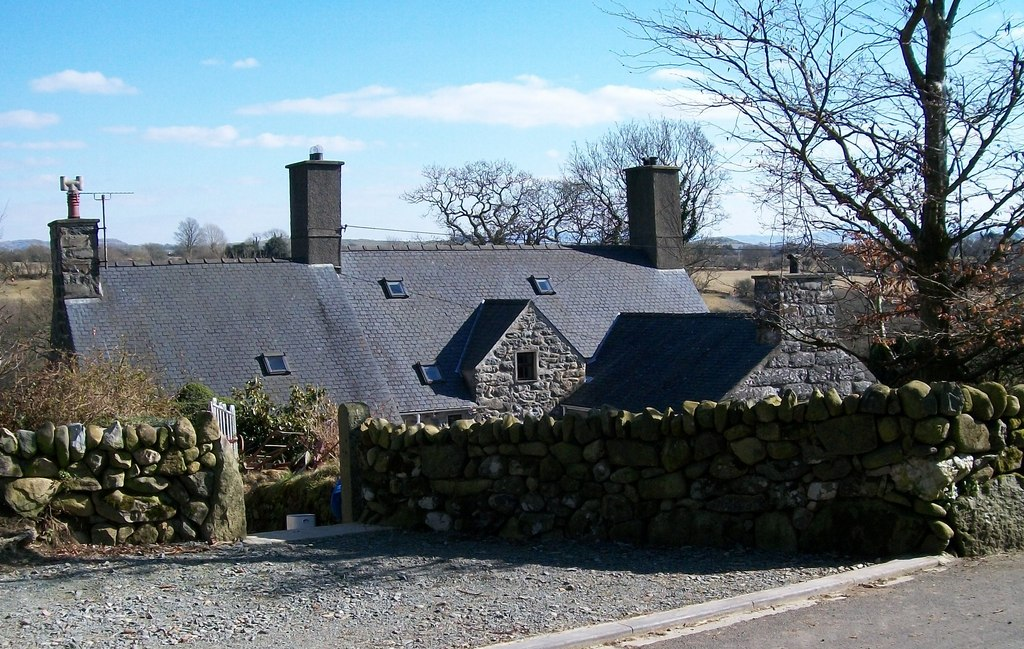
- The imposing Betws Bach Farmhouse from the back of the building

- Location within Wales

General information
- Status: Listed Building
- Location: Llanystumdwy, Gwynedd, Wales
- Coordinates: 52.9440°N 4.2766°W

Website
- http://cadw.wales.gov.uk

Betws Bach farmhouse is a Grade II listed building in the community of Llanystumdwy. The main part of the farmhouse was built in the 17th century (around 1649) and still retains much charm, historic interest and character. The main part of this imposing farmhouse is three storeys and has three inglenook fireplaces. To the rear and north gable an addition was built in the 18th century. The house has a wealth of oak beams and exposed stonework.
