= Charles Paget (Royal Navy officer) =

British sailor and politician

Vice-Admiral Sir Charles Paget GCH
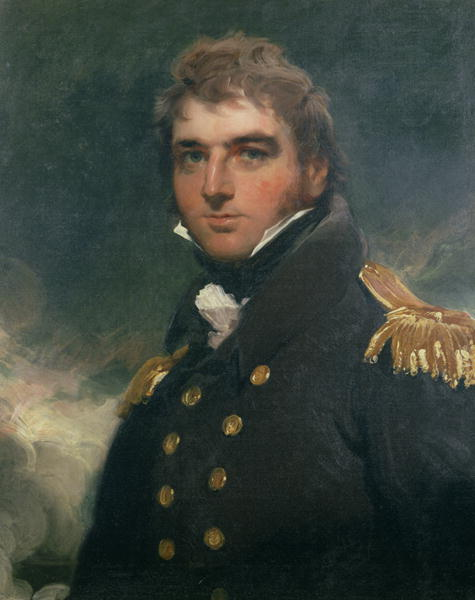
- Portrait of Paget by Sir Thomas Lawrence
- Born: 7 October 1778
- Died: 27 January 1839 (aged 60); St Thomas, Jamaica
- Military career
- Allegiance: United Kingdom
- Branch: Royal Navy
- Service years: 1790–1839
- Rank: Vice-Admiral
- Commands: HMS Martin; HMS Penelope; HMS Brilliant; HMS Hydra; HMS Endymion; HMS Egyptienne; HMS Revenge; HMS Malta; HMS Superb; HMY Prince Regent; HMY Royal George; HMS Apollo; Cork Station; North America and West Indies Station
- Conflicts: French Revolutionary Wars; Battle of Camperdown; Ferrol Expedition; Napoleonic Wars; War of 1812
- Awards: Knight bachelor

Vice-Admiral Sir Charles Paget GCH (7 October 1778 – 27 January 1839) was a Royal Navy officer and liberal politician. Paget served through the French Revolutionary and Napoleonic Wars, seeing action at the Battle of Camperdown, during the Ferrol Expedition, and frequently in the Bay of Biscay in command of various frigates. He later commanded a squadron off the coast of North American during the War of 1812, after which he commanded two royal yachts. Knighted by George IV, he was promoted to rear-admiral in 1823 and commanded the Cork Station from 1828 to 1831. He was then advanced to vice-admiral in 1837 and given command of the North America and West Indies Station. He died of yellow fever at St Thomas, Jamaica, while still in post.

== Naval career ==
Vice-Admiral Sir Charles Paget (1778–1839) was the son of Henry Bayly Paget, 1st Earl of Uxbridge, and Jane Champagné, and was brother to Henry Paget, 1st Marquess of Anglesey. He joined the Royal Navy in 1790, and by 1797 he was captain of HMS Martin, a sloop of war serving at the Battle of Camperdown.

In 1798 Paget became post-captain of HMS Brilliant, a small frigate in which he captured le Dragon of 11 guns, and the St Jago, a Spanish privateer of 10 guns. In 1800 he removed into HMS Egyptienne. His next appointment was to HMS Hydra, a frigate of 38 guns, in which he proceeded to the Mediterranean where he remained about twelve months. On 6 April 1803 he commissioned HMS Endymion, a frigate of the largest class, and in the course of the ensuing summer he captured Bacchante, a French corvette of 18 guns, Adour, a store ship pierced for 20 guns, and General, a Morcau schooner privateer of 16 guns. He subsequently intercepted several richly laden Spanish merchantmen coming from South America, and he also captured Colombe, a French corvette of 10 guns off Ushant.

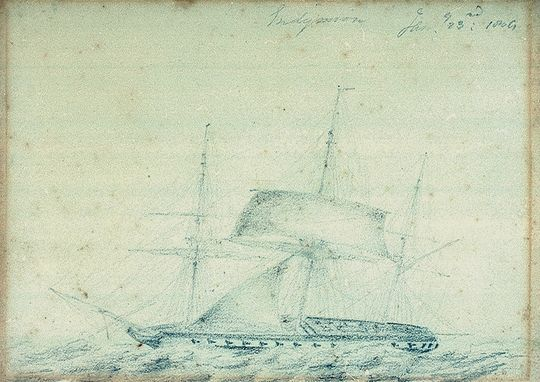
A sketch of HMS Endymion by Paget.

Towards the close of the long French war, Paget, while cruising in the Endymion on the coast of Spain, sighted a French ship-of-the-line in imminent danger, embayed among rocks upon a lee shore, bowsprit and foremast gone, and riding by a stream cable, her only remaining one. Though it was blowing a gale, Paget bore down to the assistance of his enemy, dropped his sheet anchor on the Frenchman's bow, buoyed the cable, and veered it athwart his hawse. This the disabled ship succeeded in getting in, and thus seven hundred lives were rescued from destruction. After performing this chivalrous action, Endymion, being herself in great peril, hauled to the wind, let go her bower anchor, club-hauled and stood off shore on the other tack.

Paget participated in an attack on a French frigate squadron anchored at Saint-Vaast-la-Hougue at the action of 15 November 1810, which ultimately led to the destruction of the Elisa.

He was appointed to HMS Superb, another third rate belonging to the Channel Fleet, and during a cruise in the bay of Biscay he took several prizes. In 1814 he was employed on the coast of North America under the orders of Sir Alexander Cochrane by whom he was entrusted with the command of a squadron stationed off New London and took part in an attack upon Wareham, Massachusetts during the War of 1812.

Captain Paget was appointed to the command of HMY Prince Regent on 1 January 1819 and afterwards to the Royal George. He attended King George IV, and before his accession he nominated Charles as a Knight Grand Cross of the Hanoverian Guelphic Order and a Knight Bachelor at Brighton on 19 October 1819. In January 1822, Sir Charles succeeded his brother Lieut Gen Sir Edward Paget as a Groom of the Bedchamber, and he continued to hold that appointment during the whole reign of King William IV.

He was made a commodore on board the Royal George on 26 July 1822 and was advanced to the rank of rear admiral on 9 April 1823.

In March 1828 he was appointed commander in chief on the coast of Ireland. He attained the rank of vice admiral on 10 January 1837 and succeeded Vice Admiral Sir Peter Halkett in the command of the North America and West Indies Squadron using HMS Cornwallis as his flagship.

Sir Charles Paget died on board HMS Tartarus, whilst she was on her way from Port Royal to Bermuda. His death ensued after a violent attack of yellow fever during which for three days his death was hourly expected. Of his staff of twenty, six had died including Dr Scott the surgeon. Feeling better, but weak, and strangely free from rheumatic pain on 19 January he embarked on board the Tartarus, for the purpose of going to the Bermudas. He was off those islands for three days, but being unable to reach them was obliged to go back to St Thomas's.

== Parliament ==
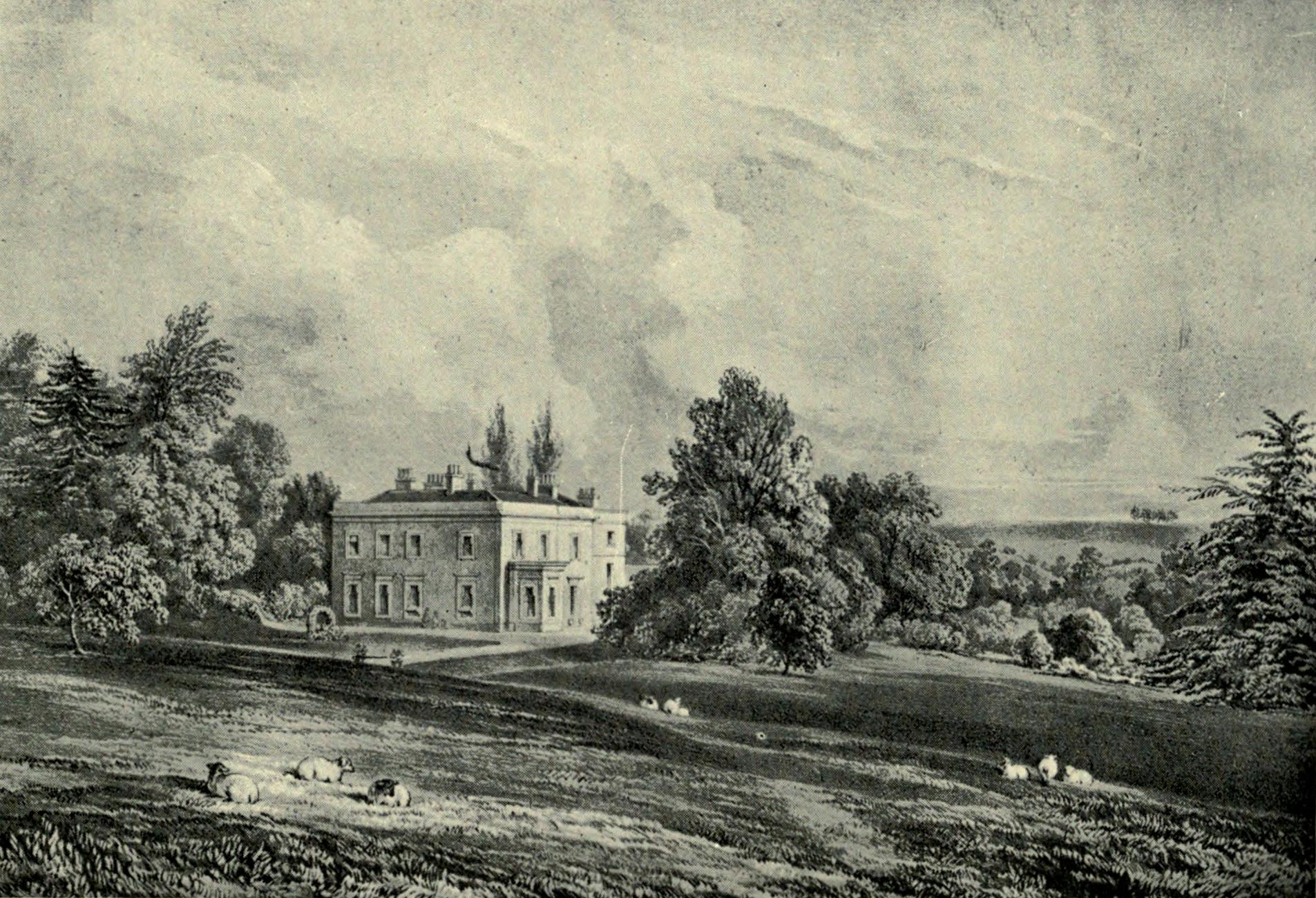
Fair Oak at Rogate

He was Member of Parliament for the rotten borough of Milborne Port from 1804 to 1806, then succeeded his elder brother Edward Paget as MP for Caernarvon Boroughs from 1806 to 1826, and was its MP again from 1831 to 1835. According to Hansard's records, Paget made no contributions to debates in parliament.

== Family ==
Peget was buried in St Bartholomew's Church in Rogate in West Sussex. He had married Elizabeth Monck. She was daughter of Henry Monck of Fore, County Westmeath and his wife Lady Elizabeth Araminta Gore, daughter of Arthur Gore, 2nd Earl of Arran, and granddaughter of George Paul Monck, Member of Parliament for Coleraine. She died at Fair Oak on 17 August 1843, aged 56 years.

Their children included:

- Charles Henry Paget R.N. (15 July 1806 – 26 May 1845).
- Elizabeth Jane Paget (1807-13 June 1866)
- Caroline Paget (1808-11 June 1880) married her cousin Capt. Algernon Henry Champagne Capell, grandson of William Capell, 4th Earl of Essex and Lady Harriet Bladen. They had two sons, and a daughter.
- Louisa Augusta Paget (born 1810) married in 1828 William Augustus Broadhead (born 1802), of the 7th Hussars, son of Theodore Henry Broadhead.
- Edward Paget (born 1811)
- Georgiana Paget (born 1815)
- Brownlow Henry Paget (born 1819). He died on board HMS Dublin on 18 February 1843, aged 24 years, as Lieutenant.
- Frederic(k)a Georgina Augusta (born 1822). She died at Fair Oak, Rogate on 12 September 1835 aged 13 years.

Also Horatio Henry Paget died aged 15 as a midshipman on board HMS Talbot on 28 April 1828.

Parliament of the United Kingdom
Preceded by Lord Paget; Hugh Leycester	Member of Parliament for Milborne Port; 1804–1806; With: Hugh Leycester	Succeeded by Lord Paget; Hugh Leycester
Preceded by Edward Paget	Member of Parliament for Caernarvon Boroughs; 1806–1826	Succeeded by Lord William Paget
Preceded by William Ormsby-Gore	Member of Parliament for Caernarvon Boroughs; 1831–1833	Succeeded by Owen Jones Ellis Nanney
Preceded by Owen Jones Ellis Nanney	Member of Parliament for Caernarvon Boroughs; 1833–1835	Succeeded by Love Parry Jones Parry
Military offices
Preceded by Robert Plampin	Commander-in-Chief, Cork Station; 1828–1831	Succeeded by Post disbanded
Preceded by Sir Peter Halkett	Commander-in-Chief, North America and West Indies Station; 1837–1839	Succeeded by Sir Thomas Harvey
