= Owen Jones Ellis Nanney =

Major Owen Jones Ellis Nanney (27 September 1790 - 27 October 1870) was a Welsh politician, who very briefly represented Carnarvon Boroughs in Parliament in 1833.

He was born Owen Jones, and adopted the Ellis Nanney (or Ellis-Nanney) surnames on inheriting an estate from his uncle.

Standing as a Tory, Nanney contested the Carnarvon District of Boroughs seat (now Caernarfon) at the 1832 general election, the first after it had been expanded by the Reform Act 1832. He was initially recorded as defeated by Sir Charles Paget, the Whig incumbent, with a small majority. Nanney brought an election petition challenging some of the votes, which was found in his favour on 6 March, and he took his seat on 8 March. However, a counter-petition was then brought, alleging that the votes were indeed valid. After scrutiny, Paget was again declared elected on 22 May, and Nanney lost his seat.

He contested Carnarvon Boroughs in the 1835 general election, but was unsuccessful.

His only son, Hugh Ellis-Nanney (1845–1920), ran for Parliament unsuccessfully on a number of occasions, and was created a baronet in 1897.
