= List of baronetcies in the Baronetage of the United Kingdom: E =

Peerages and baronetcies of Britain and Ireland
Extant	All
Dukes	Dukedoms
Marquesses	Marquessates
Earls	Earldoms
Viscounts	Viscountcies
Barons	Baronies
Baronets	Baronetcies
En, Ire, NS, GB, UK (extinct)

This is a list of baronetcies in the Baronetage of the United Kingdom. They have been created since 1801 when they replaced the baronetages in the Baronetage of Great Britain, and Baronetage of Ireland. This list is not currently complete.

Title	Date of creation	Surname	Current status	Notes
Eardley-Wilmot of Berkswell Hall	1821	Eardley-Wilmot	extant	
Smith, later Eardley of Hadley	1802	Smith, Eardley	extinct 1875	
Earle of Allerton Tower	1869	Earle	extant	
East of Calcutta	1823	East	extinct 1878	
Easthope of Fir Grove	1841	Easthope	extinct 1865	
Ebrahim of Pabaney Villa	1910	Ebrahim	extant	
Eckstein of Fairwarp and the Sudan	1929	Eckstein	extinct 1948	
Edgar of Chalfont	1920	Edgar	extinct 1934	
Edge of Ribble Lodge	1937	Edge	dormant	second Baronet died 1984
Edwards-Moss of Chiddingfold	1868	Edwards-Moss	dormant	fourth Baronet died 1988
Edwards of Garth	1838	Edwards	extinct 1850	
Edwards of Knighton	1907	Edwards	extinct 1927	
Edwards of Pye Nest	1866	Edwards	extant	
Edwards of Treforis	1921	Edwards	extinct 1999	
Eley of Sagamore	1921	Eley	extinct 1951	
Elgar of Broadheath	1931	Elgar	extinct 1934	composer Sir Edward Elgar
Ellerman of Connaught Square	1905	Ellerman	extinct 1973	
Elliot of Penshaw	1874	Elliot	extinct 1911	
Elliott of Limpsfield	1917	Elliott	extant	
Ellis-Griffith of Llanindan	1918	Ellis-Grffith	extinct 1934	
Ellis-Nanney of Gwynfryn and Cefndeuddwr	1898	Ellis-Nanney	extinct 1920	
Ellis of Byfleet and Hertford Street	1882	Ellis	extinct 1912	Lord Mayor of London
Ellis of Threshfield	1932	Ellis	extinct 1956	
Elphinstone of Sowerby	1816	Elphinstone	extant	
Elton of Widworthy Court	1838	Elton	extinct 1884	
Emerson-Tennent of Tempo Manor	1867	Emerson-Tennent	extinct 1876	
Ennis of Balinahoun Court	1866	Ennis	extinct 1884	
Erichsen of Cavendish Place	1895	Erichsen	extinct 1896	
Errington of Lackham Manor	1885	Errington	extinct 1920	
Errington of Ness	1963	Errington	extant	
Erskine-Hill of Quothquhan	1945	Erskine-Hill	extant	
Erskine of Cambo	1821	Erskine	extant	
Erskine of Rerrick	1961	Erskine	extinct 1995	first Baronet created Baron Erskine of Rerrick in 1964
Esplen of Hardres Court	1921	Esplen	extant	
Evans-Bevan of Cadoxton Juxta	1958	Evans-Bevan	extant	
Evans of Allestree Hall	1887	Evans	extinct 1892	
Evans of Rottingdean	1963	Evans	extinct 1983	
Evans of Tubbendeny	1902	Evans	extinct 1970	
Evans of Wightwick	1920	Evans	extant	
Eve of Silsoe	1943	Eve	extant	first Baronet created Baron Silsoe in 1963
Everard of Randlestown	1911	Everard	extant	
Ewart of Glenmachan	1887	Ewart	dormant	sixth Baronet died 1995
Ewart of White House	1910	Ewart	extinct 1928	
