= Eifionydd =

Area of Wales

Coordinates: 52.926°N 4.258°W

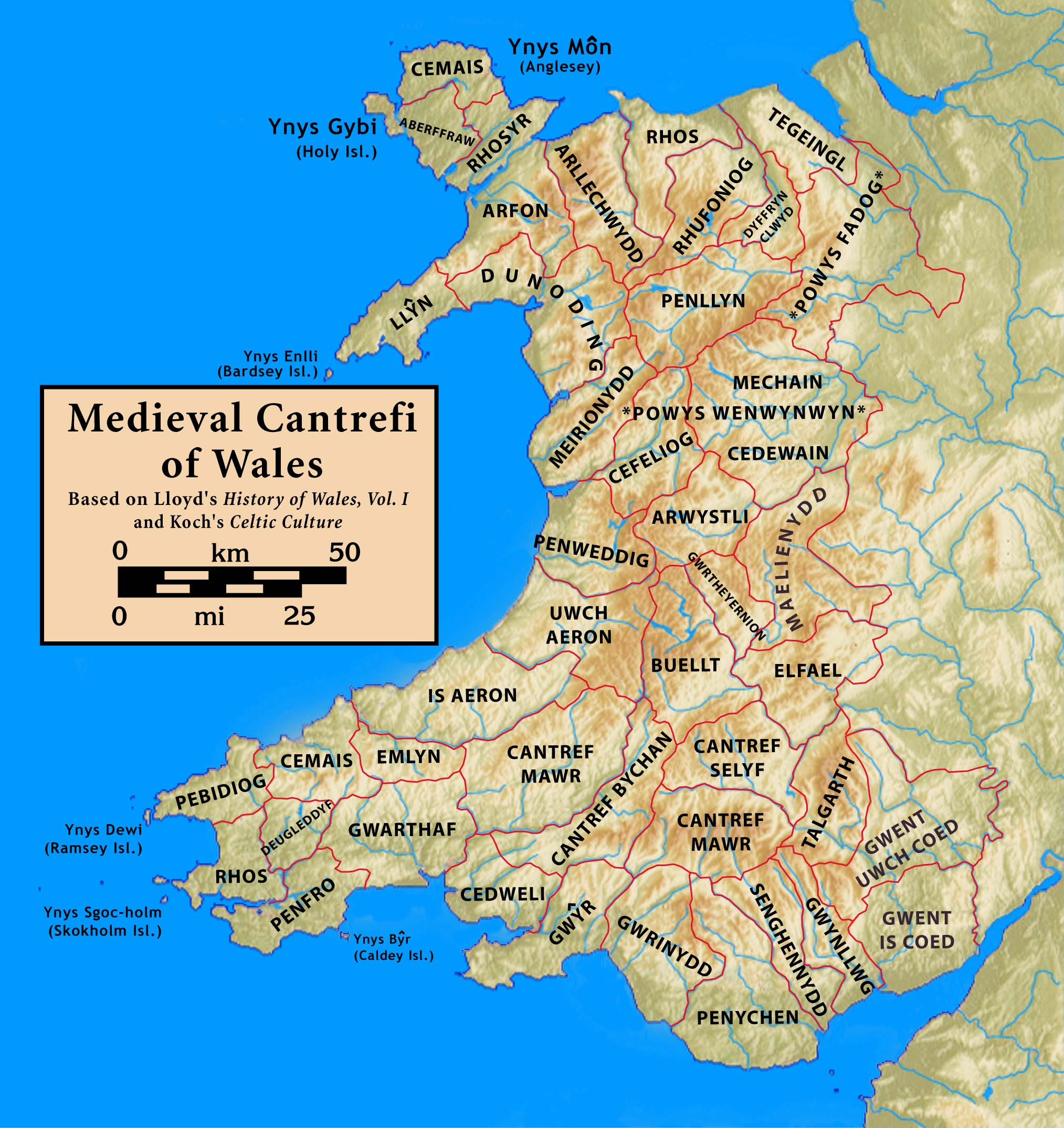
Map of Welsh cantrefs

Eifionydd (Welsh pronunciation: [ɛiˈvjɔnɨð]) is an area in north-west Wales covering the south-eastern part of the Llŷn Peninsula from Porthmadog to just east of Pwllheli. The Afon Erch forms its western border. It now lies in Gwynedd.

The commote of Eifionydd formed the northern half of the former minor kingdom of Dunoding within the Kingdom of Gwynedd. It traditionally took its name from Eifion, son of Dunod (who gave his name to the cantref) and grandson of Cunedda Wledig. The chief centre of the commote was at Criccieth, although there may have been an earlier royal residence at Dolbenmaen. Although it is not currently a unit of local government, the name is still in common use for the region. It includes the villages of Chwilog, Abererch, Llanaelhaearn, Pencaenewydd, Llangybi, Llanystumdwy, Llanarmon, Rhoslan, Pentrefelin, Penmorfa, Garndolbenmaen, Bryncir and Pantglas.

R. Williams Parry's poem Eifionydd contrasts rural Eifionydd with the bustling slate quarries of Dyffryn Nantlle.

Eifionydd commote: parishes
