= Maurice Davies =

Maurice Davies may refer to:

- M. C. Davies (Maurice Coleman Davies, 1835–1913), timber miller in the early history of Western Australia
- Maurice Davies (MP), member of parliament for Caernarfon in 1559
- Maurice Davies, maker of Bell plate
- Maurice Davies, open world champion, see Tornado

== See also ==
- Morris Davies (1780–1861), Welsh poet
- Maurice Davis (disambiguation)
- Morris Davis (disambiguation)
