= Arfon by-election =

Arfon by-election may refer to one of two parliamentary by-elections held for the British House of Commons in the Arfon division of Caernarvonshire, North Wales:

- 1911 Arfon by-election
- 1915 Arfon by-election
