= Edward Griffith =

Edward Griffith may refer to:

- Edward Griffith (zoologist) (1790–1858), British naturalist and solicitor
- Edward O. Griffith, British sculptor
- Edward H. Griffith (1894–1975), American film director, screenwriter and producer
- Edward Griffith (MP), member of parliament for Caernarfon
- Teddy Griffith (born 1936), West Indian cricketer
- Edward Griffith (American politician), American New York State Assembly member

== See also ==
- Edward Griffiths (disambiguation)
- Edward Griffith Colpoys (c. 1767–1832), Royal Navy officer
