= Robert Jones (of Castell-March) =

Robert Jones (born c.1596-died c.1653) was a Welsh landowner and politician who sat in the House of Commons between 1625 and 1629.

Jones was the son of Sir William Jones and his wife Margaret Griffith, daughter of Griffith ap John Griffith of Kevenamulch, Caernarvonshire. His father was a judge and MP. Robert himself studied law as a student at Lincoln's Inn in 1617. He married by 1641 Anne West, by whom he had one daughter.

In 1625, Jones was elected Member of Parliament for Carnarvon in place of Edward Littleton, his brother-in-law, who preferred to sit for Leominster. He again replaced Littleton after the 1626 election. In 1628 he was elected MP for Flintshire and sat until 1629 when King Charles decided to rule without parliament for eleven years. He held the estate of Castell-March.

A Royalist on the outbreak of the first Civil War, in 1643 he was High Sheriff of Caernarvonshire and magistrate for the county, and governor of Caernarvon Castle from 1643 to 1646. He sought immunity from delinquency proceedings by Parliament by claiming to have been party to the surrender of Beaumaris Castle to Roundhead forces. During the Second Civil War, he was detained by Parliament while he was sued by four merchants for goods seized for the Royalist war effort to damages of £1,730. He was last recorded an apparent debt prisoner at the Marshalsea in 1653, when he petitioned for relief but he apparently died without the case being resolved.

Parliament of England
Preceded by Edward Littleton	Member of Parliament for Carnarvon; 1625	Succeeded by Edward Littleton
Preceded by Edward Littleton	Member of Parliament for Carnarvon; 1626	Succeeded by Edward Littleton
Preceded by John Salusbury	Member of Parliament for Flintshire; 1628–1629	Parliament suspended until 1640
