= Henry Robins =

Henry Robins or Robbins may refer to:

- Henry Robins (priest) (1882–1960), Dean of Salisbury
- Henry Ephraim Robins, President of Colby College, Maine, United States
- Henry Robins (MP) (died 1562 or later), Welsh MP for Caernarfon
- Henry Asher Robbins (1829–1914), American manufacturer

== See also ==
- Harry S. Robins (born 1950), American voice actor and screenwriter
