= Alun Pugh =

Welsh Labour politician

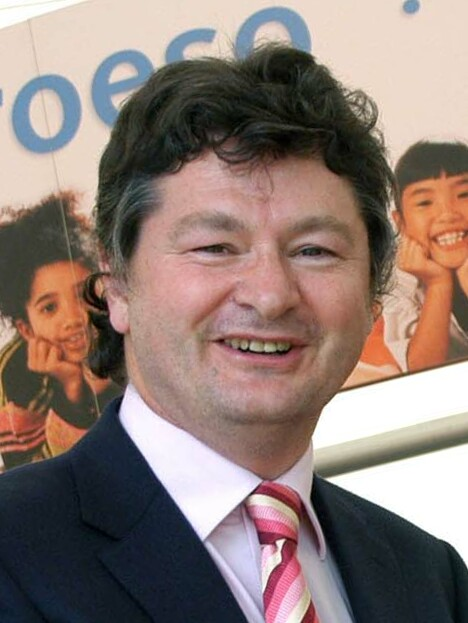
- Pugh in 2004

Minister for Culture, Sports and Welsh Language
- In office 9 May 2003 – 3 May 2007
- Preceded by: Jenny Randerson
- Succeeded by: Carwyn Jones

Deputy Minister for Economic Development
- In office 17 October 2000 – 9 May 2003
- Preceded by: Christine Chapman (Note: As Deputy Secretary for Education and the Economy)
- Succeeded by: Brian Gibbons

Deputy Secretary for Health and Social Services
- In office 23 February 2000 – 17 October 2000
- Preceded by: Role Established
- Succeeded by: Brian Gibbons

Member of the Welsh Assembly for Clwyd West
- In office 6 May 1999 – 3 May 2007
- Preceded by: New Assembly
- Succeeded by: Darren Millar

Personal details
- Born: 9 June 1955 (age 71) Llwynypia, Wales
- Party: Labour
- Education: Polytechnic of Wales; University College, Cardiff

Alun John Pugh (born 9 June 1955) is a Welsh politician who served as the Member of the National Assembly for Wales (AM) for Clwyd West from 1999 to 2007. A member of Welsh Labour, he is a former Welsh Assembly Government Minister for Culture, Welsh Language and Sport. Pugh lives in Ruthin but resided in Deganwy, Conwy for much of his time in North Wales. He has learnt Welsh as an adult.

== Early life ==
Pugh was born in Llwynypia, Mid Glamorgan, into a poor coal mining family. He has a degree in business finance and post-graduate qualifications in computer science and education, and moved to North Wales from Newcastle Upon Tyne.

== Professional career ==
Pugh was Head of Business Studies at Coleg Llandrillo Cymru, a large further education college. Four years later, he was promoted to an associate principalship at West Cheshire College. Following the 2007 elections he took a mountaineering sabbatical in the Himalayas, and on his return to Wales was appointed as Director of the Snowdonia Society, a campaigning environmental charity. He was a columnist for the Daily Post (North Wales) and ran consultancy projects before his re selection for the 2015 general election.

== Political career ==
Pugh was elected in the National Assembly for Wales election in 1999 to the marginal Clwyd West seat of the National Assembly for Wales. He defeated then tory leader Rod Richards for the seat. In February 2000, he was appointed by Rhodri Morgan as Deputy Secretary for Health and Social Services, assisting Jane Hutt. In October 2000, after Welsh Labour entered a Coalition with the Liberal Democrats, he became the Deputy Minister for Economic Development.

He was re-elected in 2003 as well as being appointed to the post of Minister for Culture, Welsh Language and Sport in the Welsh Assembly Government. Pugh remained an Assembly Member until his 2007 election defeat by Conservative Darren Millar by a margin of 1,596 votes.

Pugh stood in the new constituency of Arfon in the 2010 Westminster election but narrowly lost to Plaid Cymru's Hywel Williams by a margin of 1,455 votes. He also contested the seat at the 2015 general election, again against Hywel Williams, where he was defeated by a larger margin of 3,668 votes.

== Offices held ==
Senedd
Preceded by (new post)	Assembly Member for Clwyd West; 1999 – 2007	Succeeded by Darren Millar
Political offices
Preceded by (new post)	Deputy Minister for Economic Development; 2000–2003	Succeeded by Brian Gibbons
Preceded by (new post)	Minister for Culture, Welsh Language and Sport; 2003–2007	Succeeded by (post re-organised)
