= Rhys ap Gruffudd (disambiguation) =

Rhys ap Gruffudd (c.1132–1197) was a Prince of Dehubarth in South Wales.

It may also refer to:

- Sir Rhys ap Gruffudd (c.1283–1356), South Wales nobleman and soldier
- Rhys ap Gruffudd (rebel) (1508–1531), nobleman and rebel executed by Henry VIII

== See also ==
- Rhys Gruffydd (c.1513–1580), Member of Parliament for Caernarfon
