= Morris Davis =

Morris Davis may refer to:

- Moe Davis, U.S. Air Force officer, attorney, politician, and judge
- Morris Davis (composer) (1904–1968), Canadian composer, arranger, and conductor
- Morry Davis (1894–1985), British politician

== See also ==
- Morris Davies (1780–1861), Welsh poet
- Maurice Davis (disambiguation)
- Maurice Davies (disambiguation)
