= 1945 Caernarvon Boroughs by-election =

UK parliamentary by-election

- 26 April 1945

Constituency of Caernarvon Boroughs
- Turnout: 58.8% (▼18.6%)
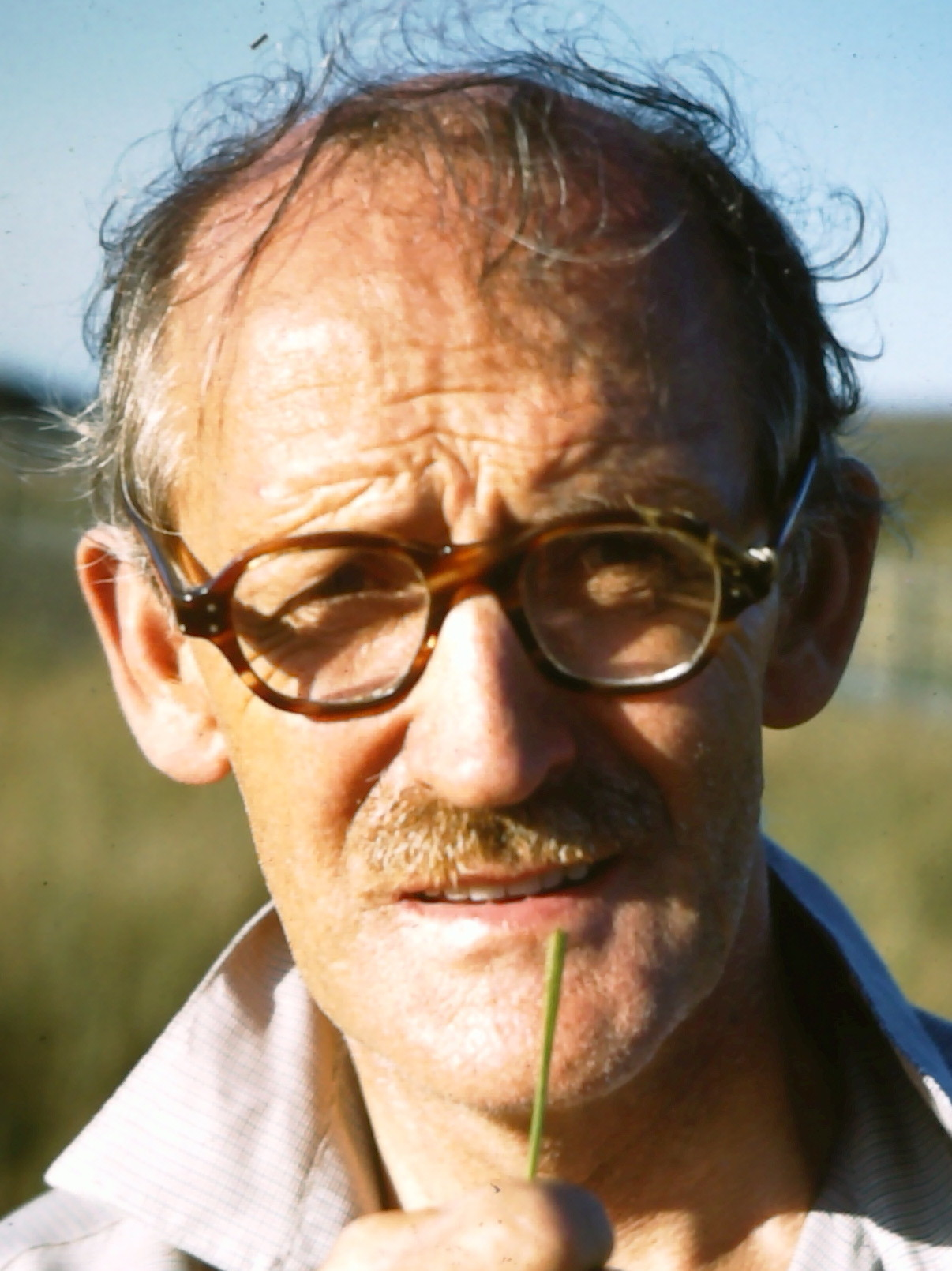
	First party	Second party
	Lib
Candidate	Seaborne Davies	John Edward Daniel
Party	Liberal	Plaid Cymru
Popular vote	20,754	6,844
Percentage	75.2%	24.8%
Swing	▲8.6%	New
MP before election
David Lloyd George
Liberal
Elected MP
Seaborne Davies
Liberal

The 1945 Caernarvon Boroughs by-election was a parliamentary by-election held on 26 April 1945 for the British House of Commons constituency of Caernarvon Boroughs.

== Previous MP ==
The seat had become vacant when the constituency's Liberal Member of Parliament (MP), David Lloyd George (1863–1945) had been elevated to the peerage as the 1st Earl Lloyd George of Dwyfor in January 1945. He died two months later, on 26 March 1945, before the by-election took place.

Lloyd George was first elected as the constituency's MP at the 1890 Caernarvon Boroughs by-election, caused by the death of the previous Conservative MP. During a long and distinguished political career, the former MP had served in many high offices, notably as Chancellor of the Exchequer 1908–1915 and Prime Minister of the United Kingdom 1916–1922. He had led the Liberal Party, after the retirement of H. H. Asquith, from 1926 to 1931.

== Candidates ==
The election took place during the Second World War. Under an agreement among the Conservative, Labour and Liberal parties, who were participating in a wartime coalition, the party holding a seat would not be opposed by the other two at a by-election. Accordingly, the Liberal Party nominated a candidate, but no Labour or Conservative representative was put forward. Plaid Cymru, which was not party to the electoral agreement, named a candidate; so a contested poll took place.

Two candidates were nominated. The list below is set out in descending order of the number of votes received at the by-election.

1. The Liberal Party candidate, supporting the coalition government, was 40-year old Seaborne Davies (1904–1984). After winning the by-election, he served in Parliament between April and July 1945 only, as he was defeated by a Conservative candidate in the 1945 United Kingdom general election.

2. Representing Plaid Cymru was Professor John Edward Daniel. He also contested Caernarvon Boroughs in the 1945 general election.

== Result ==
1945 Caernarvon Boroughs by-election
Party	Candidate	Votes	%	±%
Liberal	Seaborne Davies	20,754	75.2	+8.6
Plaid Cymru	John Edward Daniel	6,844	24.8	N/A
Majority		13,910	50.4	+17.2
Turnout		27,598	58.8	−18.6
Registered electors		46,910		
Liberal hold		Swing	-8.1	

== See also ==
- Caernarvon Boroughs constituency
- List of United Kingdom by-elections
- United Kingdom by-election records
