= Price White =

Welsh footballer

Personal information
- Date of birth: 25 April 1873
- Place of birth: Wales
- Date of death: 1952 (aged 78–79)

International career
| Years | Team | Apps | (Gls) |
| 1896 | Wales | 1 | (0) |

Price White (25 April 1873 – 1952) was a Welsh international footballer. He was part of the Wales national football team, playing one match on 29 February 1896 against Ireland.

He lived in Bangor, North Wales and was employed as an engineer by the Bangor Electrical Company. On 12 August 1902 he married Charlotte Bell, the suffragist and local councillor.

They had two children together, Margaret and David Archibald, who became a solicitor and Conservative Party politician.

== See also ==
- List of Wales international footballers (alphabetical)
