= Caernarfon (UK Parliament constituency) =

UK Parliament constituency (1801–2010)

Coordinates: 52.976°N 4.308°W

- Former county constituency for the House of Commons
- Boundary of Caernarfon in Wales for the 2005 general election
- Preserved county: Gwynedd
- Major settlements: Caernarfon

1950–2010
- Seats: One
- Replaced by: Arfon and Dwyfor Meirionnydd

1536–1950
- Seats: One
- Type of constituency: District of Boroughs constituency

Caernarfon was a parliamentary constituency centred on the town of Caernarfon in Wales. It elected one Member of Parliament (MP).

The constituency was created in 1536 as a District of Boroughs, represented in the House of Commons of England until 1707, in the House of Commons of Great Britain from 1707 to 1800, and in the House of Commons of the United Kingdom from 1801 to 1950. The District of Boroughs was abolished in 1950, and replaced with a county constituency of the same name, which was itself abolished in 2010.

== History ==
Known as Carnarvon until 1832, and then as the Carnarvon Boroughs or Carnarvon District of Boroughs from 1832 to 1950 and as Caernarvon from 1950 to 1983, it is named after Caernarfon, the main town within the constituency. Its most famous member was David Lloyd George, who was MP for 55 years. When Lloyd George became prime minister in 1916 it became the first Welsh constituency to be represented by a serving prime minister. Plaid Cymru held the seat continuously from 1974 until its abolition in 2010, longer than they have held any other seat.

== Boundaries ==
The constituency names, in this section, follow the format and the spelling used by F. W. S. Craig in his British Parliamentary Election Results series. Variations may be found in other sources.

=== Caernarvon 1536–1832 ===
On the basis of information from several volumes of the History of Parliament, it is apparent that the history of the borough representation from Wales and Monmouthshire is more complicated than that of the English boroughs.

The Laws in Wales Act 1535 (26 Hen. 8. c. 26) provided for a single borough seat for each of 11 of the 12 Welsh counties and Monmouthshire. The legislation, which was passed in 1536 (using the modern civil year starting on 1 January), was ambiguous as to which communities were enfranchised. The county towns were awarded a seat, but this in some fashion represented all the ancient boroughs of the county, as the others were required to contribute to the member's wages. It is not clear if the burgesses of the contributing boroughs could vote. The only election under the original scheme was for the 1542 parliament. It seems that only burgesses from the county towns actually took part. The Parliament Act 1543 (35 Hen. 8. c. 11) confirmed that the contributing boroughs could send representatives to take part in the election at the county town. As far as can be told from surviving indentures of returns, the degree to which the out boroughs participated varied, but by the end of the 16th century all the seats had some participation from them at some elections at least.

The original scheme was modified by later legislation and decisions of the House of Commons, which were sometimes made with no regard to precedent or evidence: for example in 1728 it was decided that only the freemen of the borough of Montgomery could participate in the election for that seat, thus disenfranchising the freemen of Llanidloes, Welshpool and Llanfyllin.

In the case of Caernarvonshire (now Caernarfonshire), the county town was Caernarvon (now known as Caernarfon). The out boroughs were Conway (now Conwy), Criccieth (or Cricieth), Nevin (now known as Nefyn), and Pwllheli. The freemen of the five boroughs were entitled to vote. In the 1715–1754 period there were estimated to be about 1,600 freemen, of whom about 1,200 were non-resident. Later in the 18th century the estimated electorate was about 1,000 freemen.

=== Caernarvon Boroughs 1832–1950 ===
The Caernarvon Boroughs was a district of boroughs constituency, which grouped a number of parliamentary boroughs in Caernarvonshire into one single member constituency. The voters in each participating borough cast ballots, which were added together over the whole district to decide the result of the poll. The enfranchised communities in this district, from 1832, were the six boroughs of Caernarvon, Bangor, Conway, Criccieth, Nevin, and Pwllheli.

The exact boundaries of the parliamentary boroughs in the district were altered by the Boundary Act 1868, but the general nature of the constituency was unchanged. There were no further boundary changes in the 1885 redistribution of parliamentary seats.

In 1918 the constituency was redefined, to include the then local government areas of the Municipal Boroughs of Bangor, Caernarvon, Conway, and Pwllheli; the Urban Districts of Criccieth, Llandudno, Llanfairfechan and Penmaenmawr, as well as the parish of Nevin.

From 1918 to 1950 the administrative county of Caernarvonshire was divided into two seats: Caernarvon Boroughs and a Caernarvonshire county constituency. The territory of the borough seat was enclaved within the county constituency. Different local authorities, included in the borough constituency, were not necessarily adjoining.

=== Caernarvon 1950–1983 ===
The redistribution, which took effect in 1950, created two Caernarvonshire county divisions – Caernarvon in the south-western two thirds of the county and Conway (later spelt Conwy) in the north-eastern third. The new divisions included territory which had come from both of the two old seats.

The local authorities, whose territories were combined to form the constituency in 1950, were the Municipal Boroughs of Caernarvon, and Pwllheli; the Urban Districts of Criccieth, and Portmadoc; as well as the Rural Districts of Gwyrfai and Lleyn. This arrangement was not altered by the redistribution which took effect in February 1974, which was based on the pre-1974 local government boundaries.

From 1 April 1974, a new pattern of counties was created in Wales. This constituency became part of the county of Gwynedd.

=== Caernarfon from 1983 ===
In the redistribution of 1983, the spelling of the official name of the constituency was changed. The constituency boundary was unchanged, but it was redefined in terms of the local authorities created in 1974. It comprised the Borough of Arfon wards numbered 8 to 12 and 16 to 29, together with the District of Dwyfor.

In 1996 Welsh local government was again reorganised. Arfon and Dwyfor became part of a Gwynedd unitary authority.

The Parliamentary Constituencies (Wales) Order 1995, based on the pre-1996 local authority areas, came into effect in 1997. It defined this constituency as:-

(i) The following wards of the Borough of Arfon, namely, Bethel, Bontnewydd, Cadnant, Deiniolen, Llanberis, Llandwrog, Llanllyfni, Llanrug, Llanwnda, Menai (Caernarfon), Peb-lig, Penisarwaun, Penygroes, Seiont, Talysarn, Waunfawr and Y Felinheli; and

(ii) the District of Dwyfor.

Following radical boundary changes undertaken by the Boundary Commission for Wales, this seat was abolished in time for the general election in 2010, replaced by Arfon and part of Dwyfor Meirionnydd.

== Members of Parliament 1536–2010 ==
Election	Member	Party
1542	John Puleston	
1545	Robert Gruffydd	
1547	Robert Puleston	
1553 (Mar)	Gruffydd Davies	
1553 (Oct)	Henry Robins	
1554 (Apr)	Henry Robins	
1554 (Nov)	Sir Rhys Gruffydd	
1555	Sir Rhys Gruffydd	
1558	Robert Gruffydd	
1558–9	Maurice Davies	
1563	John Harington	
1571	John Griffith	
1572	John Griffith	
1584	Edward Griffith	
1586	William Griffith I	
1588	Robert Wynn	
1593	Robert Griffith	
1597	John Owen	
1601	Nicholas Griffith	
1604	John Griffith, died replaced by Clement Edmondes	
1614	Nicholas Griffith	
1621	Nicholas Griffith	
1624	Peter Mutton	
1625	Edward Littleton, sat for Leominster replaced by Robert Jones	
1626	Edward Littleton, sat for Leominster replaced by Robert Jones	
1628	Edward Littleton	
1640 April	John Glynne	
1640 November	William Thomas, disabled 1644	
1647	William Foxwist	
Not represented in Parliaments of 1653, 1654 and 1656		
1659	Robert Williams	
1660	William Glynne	
1661	William Griffith	
1679	Thomas Mostyn	
1685	John Griffith	
1689	Sir Robert Owen	
1698	Sir John Wynn, Bt	
1705	Thomas Bulkeley	
1708	William Griffith	
1713	Sir Thomas Wynn, Bt	
1749	Sir William Wynn	
1754	Robert Wynne	
1761	Sir John Wynn, Bt	
1768	Glyn Wynn	
1790	Lord Paget	
1796	Hon. Edward Paget	
1806	Hon. Sir Charles Paget	
1826	Lord William Paget	Whig
1830	William Ormsby-Gore	Tory
1831	Hon. Sir Charles Paget	Whig
1833	Owen Jones Ellis Nanney	Tory
1833	Hon. Sir Charles Paget	Whig
1835	Sir Love Jones-Parry	Whig
1837	William Bulkeley Hughes	Conservative
1846	William Bulkeley Hughes	Peelite
1859	Charles Wynne	Conservative
1865	William Bulkeley Hughes	Liberal
1882	Love Jones-Parry	Liberal
1886	Edmund Swetenham	Conservative
1890 by-election	David Lloyd George	Liberal
1916	David Lloyd George	Coalition Liberal
1922	David Lloyd George	National Liberal
1923	David Lloyd George	Liberal
1945 by-election	Seaborne Davies	Liberal
1945	David Price-White	Conservative
1950	Goronwy Roberts	Labour
Feb 1974	Dafydd Wigley	Plaid Cymru
2001	Hywel Williams	Plaid Cymru
2010	Constituency abolished: see Arfon (UK Parliament constituency)	

== Elections ==
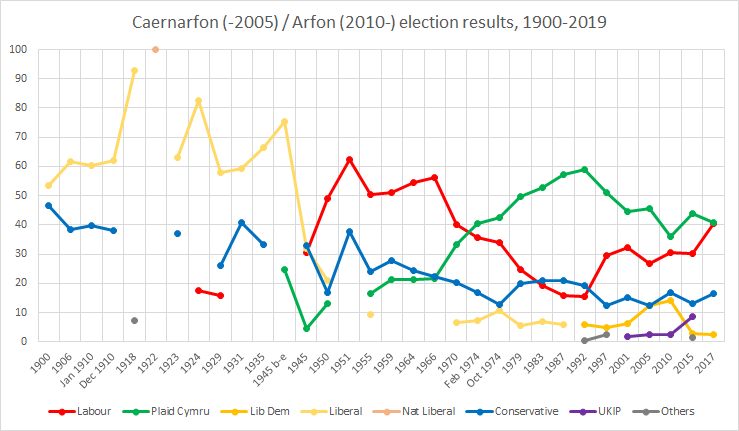
Election results since 1900

=== Elections in the 1830s ===
General election 1830: Caernarfon
Party	Candidate	Votes	%
Tory	William Ormsby-Gore	Unopposed	
Tory gain from Whig			

General election 1831: Caernarfon
Party	Candidate	Votes	%
Whig	Charles Paget	274	50.9
Tory	William Ormsby-Gore	264	49.1
Majority		10	1.8
Turnout		538	
Whig gain from Tory			

General election 1832: Caernarfon
Party	Candidate	Votes	%	±%
Whig	Charles Paget	410	53.0	+2.1
Tory	Owen Jones Ellis Nanney	363	47.0	−2.1
Majority		47	6.0	+4.2
Turnout		773	90.4	
Registered electors		855		
Whig hold		Swing	+2.1	

- On petition, the election of Paget was declared void and Nanney was declared elected. The returning officer had included votes at Pwllheli which were not eligible, and these were deducted, leading to Nanney receiving 353 votes and Paget 343 votes. On a further petition, Paget was declared elected instead of Nanney.

General election 1835: Caernarfon
Party	Candidate	Votes	%	±%
Whig	Love Jones-Parry	378	51.9	−1.1
Conservative	Owen Jones Ellis Nanney	350	48.1	+1.1
Majority		28	3.8	−2.2
Turnout		728	79.4	−11.0
Registered electors		917		
Whig hold		Swing	−1.1	

General election 1837: Caernarfon
Party	Candidate	Votes	%	±%
Conservative	William Bulkeley Hughes	405	51.3	+3.2
Whig	Charles Henry Paget	385	48.7	−3.2
Majority		20	2.4	
Turnout		790	71.9	−7.5
Registered electors		1,099		
Conservative gain from Whig		Swing	+3.2	

=== Elections in the 1840s ===
General election 1841: Caernarfon
Party	Candidate	Votes	%	±%
Conservative	William Bulkeley Hughes	416	51.8	+0.5
Whig	George Paget	387	48.2	−0.5
Majority		29	3.6	+1.2
Turnout		803	78.6	+6.7
Registered electors		1,021		
Conservative hold		Swing	+0.5	

General election 1847: Caernarfon
Party	Candidate	Votes	%	±%
Peelite	William Bulkeley Hughes	Unopposed		
Registered electors		888		
Peelite gain from Conservative				

=== Elections in the 1850s ===
General election 1852: Caernarfon
Party	Candidate	Votes	%	±%
Peelite	William Bulkeley Hughes	369	57.2	N/A
Radical	Richard Davies	276	42.8	N/A
Majority		93	14.4	N/A
Turnout		645	74.9	N/A
Registered electors		861		
Peelite hold		Swing	N/A	

General election 1857: Caernarfon
Party	Candidate	Votes	%	±%
Peelite	William Bulkeley Hughes	Unopposed		
Registered electors		919		
Peelite hold				

General election 1859: Caernarfon
Party	Candidate	Votes	%	±%
Conservative	Charles Wynne	380	53.7	N/A
Liberal	William Bulkeley Hughes	328	46.3	N/A
Majority		52	7.4	N/A
Turnout		708	76.2	N/A
Registered electors		929		
Conservative gain from Liberal		Swing	N/A	

=== Elections in the 1860s ===
General election 1865: Caernarfon
Party	Candidate	Votes	%	±%
Liberal	William Bulkeley Hughes	Unopposed		
Registered electors		1,070		
Liberal gain from Conservative				

General election 1868: Caernarfon
Party	Candidate	Votes	%	±%
Liberal	William Bulkeley Hughes	1,601	60.4	N/A
Conservative	Thomas John Wynn, 5th Baron Newborough	1,051	39.6	N/A
Majority		550	20.8	N/A
Turnout		2,652	78.6	N/A
Registered electors		3,376		
Liberal hold				

=== Elections in the 1870s ===
General election 1874: Caernarfon
Party	Candidate	Votes	%	±%
Liberal	William Bulkeley Hughes	Unopposed		
Registered electors		3,833		
Liberal hold				

=== Elections in the 1880s ===
General election 1880: Caernarfon
Party	Candidate	Votes	%	±%
Liberal	William Bulkeley Hughes	Unopposed		
Registered electors		4,157		
Liberal hold				

Hughes' death caused a by-election.

By-election, 30 Mar 1882: Caernarfon
Party	Candidate	Votes	%	±%
Liberal	Love Jones-Parry	2,037	77.4	N/A
Independent Liberal	Robert Sorton-Parry	596	22.6	N/A
Majority		1,441	54.8	N/A
Turnout		2,633	62.3	N/A
Registered electors		4,223		
Liberal hold		Swing	N/A	

General election 1885: Caernarfon
Party	Candidate	Votes	%	±%
Liberal	Love Jones-Parry	1,923	50.9	N/A
Conservative	Edmund Swetenham	1,858	49.1	N/A
Majority		65	1.8	N/A
Turnout		3,781	84.5	N/A
Registered electors		4,476		
Liberal hold		Swing	N/A	

General election 1886: Caernarfon
Party	Candidate	Votes	%	±%
Conservative	Edmund Swetenham	1,820	51.9	+2.8
Liberal	Love Jones-Parry	1,684	48.1	−2.8
Majority		136	3.8	
Turnout		3,504	78.3	−6.2
Registered electors		4,476		
Conservative gain from Liberal		Swing	+2.8	

=== Elections in the 1890s ===
By-election 1890: Caernarfon
Party	Candidate	Votes	%	±%
Liberal	David Lloyd George	1,963	50.2	+2.1
Conservative	Hugh Ellis-Nanney	1,945	49.8	−2.1
Majority		18	0.4	
Turnout		3,908	89.5	+11.2
Registered electors		4,366		
Liberal gain from Conservative		Swing	+2.1	

General election 1892: Caernarfon
Party	Candidate	Votes	%	±%
Liberal	David Lloyd George	2,154	52.4	+4.3
Conservative	John Henry Puleston	1,958	47.6	−4.3
Majority		196	4.8	
Turnout		4,112	87.1	+8.8
Registered electors		4,723		
Liberal gain from Conservative		Swing	+4.3	

David Lloyd George

General election 1895: Caernarfon
Party	Candidate	Votes	%	±%
Liberal	David Lloyd George	2,265	52.2	−0.2
Conservative	Hugh Ellis-Nanney	2,071	47.8	+0.2
Majority		194	4.4	−0.4
Turnout		4,336	88.8	+1.7
Registered electors		4,881		
Liberal hold		Swing	−0.2	

=== Elections in the 1900s ===
General election 1900: Caernarfon
Party	Candidate	Votes	%	±%
Liberal	David Lloyd George	2,412	53.3	+1.1
Conservative	Henry Platt (banker)	2,116	46.7	−1.1
Majority		296	6.6	+2.2
Turnout		4,528	87.0	−1.8
Registered electors		5,202		
Liberal hold		Swing	+1.1	

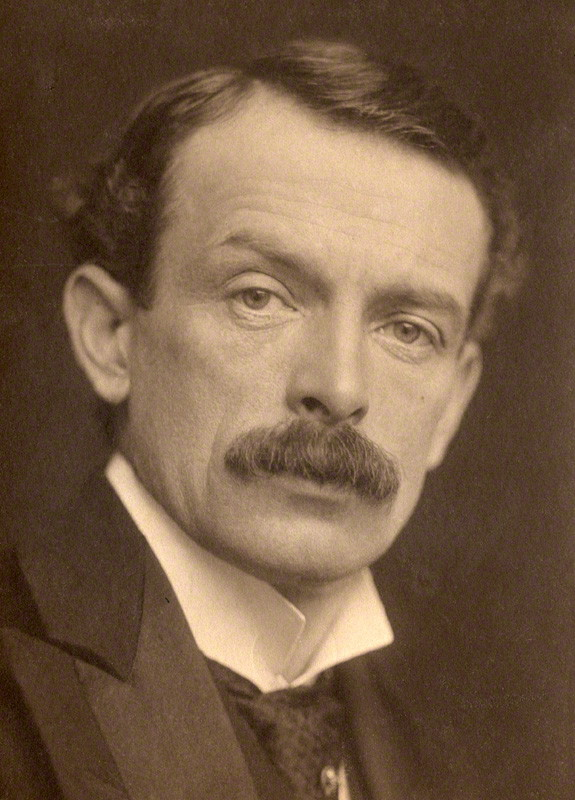
David Lloyd George

General election 1906: Caernarfon
Party	Candidate	Votes	%	±%
Liberal	David Lloyd George	3,221	61.7	+8.4
Conservative	R A Naylor	1,997	38.3	−8.4
Majority		1,224	23.4	+16.8
Turnout		5,218	92.1	+5.1
Registered electors		5,668		
Liberal hold		Swing	+8.4	

=== Elections in the 1910s ===
General election January 1910: Caernarfon
Party	Candidate	Votes	%	±%
Liberal	David Lloyd George	3,183	60.2	−1.5
Conservative	Hugh Corbet Vincent	2,105	39.8	+1.5
Majority		1,078	20.4	−3.0
Turnout		5,288	92.5	+0.4
Liberal hold		Swing	−1.5	

General election December 1910: Caernarfon
Party	Candidate	Votes	%	±%
Liberal	David Lloyd George	3,112	62.0	+1.8
Conservative	A L Jones	1,904	38.0	−1.8
Majority		1,208	24.0	+3.6
Turnout		5,288	87.7	−4.8
Liberal hold		Swing	+1.8	

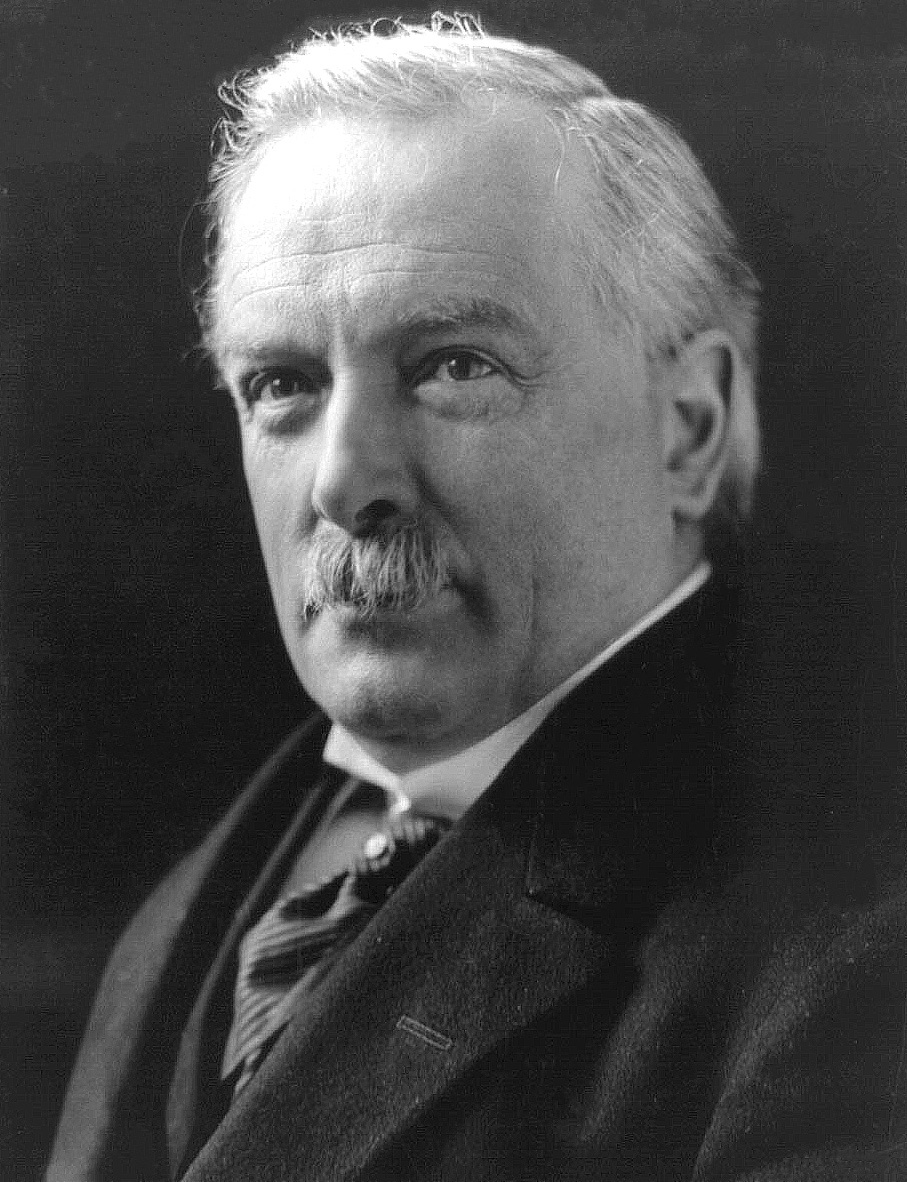
Lloyd George

General election 1918: Caernarfon
Party		Candidate	Votes	%	±%
C	Liberal	David Lloyd George	13,993	92.7	+30.7
	Independent	Austin Harrison	1,095	7.3	New
Majority			12,898	85.4	+61.4
Turnout			15,088	63.4	−24.3
	Liberal hold		Swing	+23.4	
C indicates candidate endorsed by the coalition government.

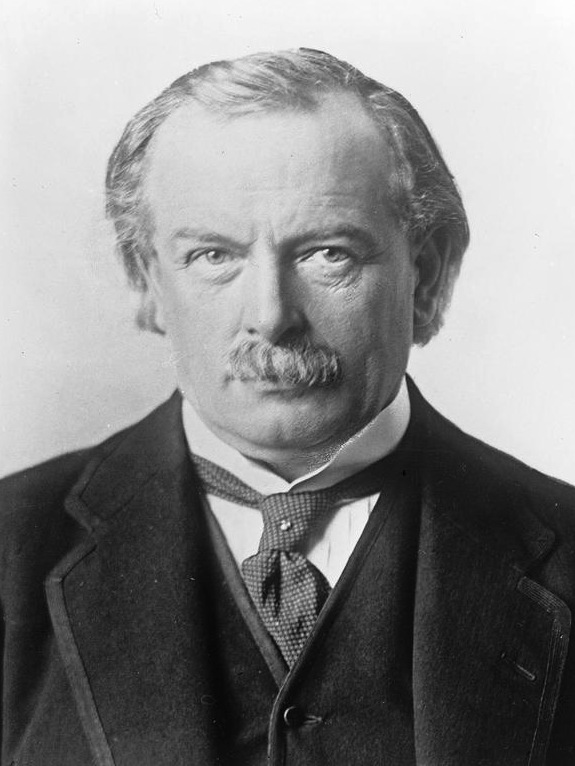
Lloyd George

=== Elections in the 1920s ===
General election 1922: Caernarfon
Party	Candidate	Votes	%	±%
National Liberal	David Lloyd George	Unopposed		
National Liberal hold				

General election 1923: Carnarvon Boroughs
Party	Candidate	Votes	%	±%
Liberal	David Lloyd George	12,499	63.1	N/A
Unionist	Austin Ellis Lloyd Jones	7,323	36.9	N/A
Majority		5,176	26.2	N/A
Turnout		19,822	80.9	N/A
Liberal hold		Swing	N/A	

General election 1924: Caernarfon
Party	Candidate	Votes	%	±%
Liberal	David Lloyd George	16,058	82.5	+19.4
Labour	Alfred Zimmern	3,401	17.5	New
Majority		12,657	65.0	+38.8
Turnout		19,459	77.0	−3.9
Liberal hold		Swing	+1.0	

General election 1929: Caernarvon Boroughs
Party	Candidate	Votes	%	±%
Liberal	David Lloyd George	16,647	58.0	−24.5
Unionist	John Bowen Davies	7,514	26.2	New
Labour	Thomas Ap Rhys	4,536	15.8	−1.7
Majority		9,133	31.8	−33.2
Turnout		28,697	81.8	+4.8
Liberal hold		Swing	−25.3	

=== Elections in the 1930s ===
General election 1931: Caernarfon
Party	Candidate	Votes	%	±%
Independent Liberals	David Lloyd George	17,101	59.3	+1.3
Conservative	F.P. Gourlay	11,714	40.7	+14.5
Majority		5,387	18.6	−13.2
Turnout		28,815	80.3	−1.5
Liberal hold		Swing	−6.6	

General election 1935: Caernarfon
Party	Candidate	Votes	%	±%
Liberal	David Lloyd George	19,242	66.6	+7.3
Conservative	A.R.P. Du Cros	9,633	33.4	−7.3
Majority		9,609	33.2	+14.6
Turnout		28,873	77.4	−2.9
Liberal hold		Swing	+7.3	

=== Elections in the 1940s ===
By-election 1945: Caernarfon
Party	Candidate	Votes	%	±%
Liberal	Seaborne Davies	20,754	75.2	+8.6
Plaid Cymru	John Edward Daniel	6,844	24.8	New
Majority		13,910	50.4	+17.2
Turnout		27,598	58.8	−18.6
Liberal hold		Swing	−8.1	

General election 1945: Caernarfon
Party	Candidate	Votes	%	±%
Conservative	David Price-White	11,432	32.9	−0.5
Liberal	Seaborne Davies	11,096	32.0	−34.6
Labour	Elwyn Jones	10,625	30.6	New
Plaid Cymru	John Edward Daniel	1,560	4.5	New
Majority		336	0.9	
Turnout		34,713	73.8	−3.6
Conservative gain from Liberal		Swing	+17.1	

=== Elections in the 1950s ===
General election 1950: Caernarfon
Party	Candidate	Votes	%	±%
Labour	Goronwy Roberts	18,369	49.1	+18.5
Liberal	Elwyn Rhys Thomas	7,791	20.9	−11.1
Conservative	G. W. Williams	6,315	16.9	−16.0
Plaid Cymru	John Jones	4,882	13.1	+8.6
Majority		10,578	28.2	
Turnout		37,357	85.9	+12.1
Labour gain from Conservative		Swing	+17.3	

General election 1951: Caernarfon
Party	Candidate	Votes	%	±%
Labour	Goronwy Roberts	22,375	62.4	+13.3
Conservative	John E B Davies	13,479	37.6	+20.7
Majority		8,896	24.8	−3.4
Turnout		35,854	82.5	−3.4
Labour hold		Swing	−3.7	

General election 1955: Caernarfon
Party	Candidate	Votes	%	±%
Labour	Goronwy Roberts	17,682	50.2	−12.2
Conservative	O Meurig Roberts	8,461	24.0	−13.6
Plaid Cymru	Robert Jones	5,815	16.5	New
Liberal	D. Geraint Williams	3,277	9.3	New
Majority		9,221	26.2	+1.4
Turnout		35,235	82.4	−0.1
Labour hold		Swing	+0.7	

General election 1959: Caernarfon
Party	Candidate	Votes	%	±%
Labour	Goronwy Roberts	17,506	51.0	+0.8
Conservative	Tom Hooson	9,564	27.8	+3.8
Plaid Cymru	Dafydd Orwig Jones	7,293	21.2	+4.7
Majority		7,942	23.2	−3.0
Turnout		34,363	83.4	+1.0
Labour hold		Swing	−1.5	

=== Elections in the 1960s ===
General election 1964: Caernarvon
Party	Candidate	Votes	%	±%
Labour	Goronwy Roberts	17,777	54.4	+3.4
Conservative	Shelagh Roberts	7,915	24.2	−3.6
Plaid Cymru	Robert E Jones	6,998	21.4	+0.2
Majority		9,862	30.2	+7.0
Turnout		32,690	80.38	−3.0
Registered electors		40,671		
Labour hold		Swing	+3.5	

General election 1966: Caernarvon
Party	Candidate	Votes	%	±%
Labour	Goronwy Roberts	17,650	56.11	+1.7
Conservative	Roger Prys	6,972	22.16	−2.0
Plaid Cymru	Humphrey Roberts	6,834	21.7	+0.3
Majority		10,678	33.9	+3.7
Turnout		31,456	78.40	−2.0
Registered electors		40,121		
Labour hold		Swing	+1.9	

=== Elections in the 1970s ===
General election 1970: Caernarvon
Party	Candidate	Votes	%	±%
Labour	Goronwy Roberts	13,627	40.1	−16.0
Plaid Cymru	Robyn Léwis	11,331	33.4	+11.7
Conservative	Kathleen J. Smith	6,812	20.1	−2.1
Liberal	John A. Williams	2,195	6.5	New
Majority		2,296	6.8	−27.1
Turnout		33,965	81.7	+3.3
Labour hold		Swing		

General election February 1974: Caernarvon
Party	Candidate	Votes	%	±%
Plaid Cymru	Dafydd Wigley	14,103	40.5	+7.1
Labour	Goronwy Roberts	12,375	35.6	−4.5
Conservative	Tristan Garel-Jones	5,803	16.7	−3.4
Liberal	Gerald Hill David	2,506	7.2	+0.7
Majority		1,728	4.9	
Turnout		34,787	82.4	+0.7
Plaid Cymru gain from Labour		Swing		

General election October 1974: Caernarvon
Party	Candidate	Votes	%	±%
Plaid Cymru	Dafydd Wigley	14,624	42.6	+2.1
Labour	Emlyn Jones Sherrington	11,730	34.1	−1.5
Conservative	Robert Lambart Harvey	4,325	12.6	−4.1
Liberal	Dewi Williams	3,690	10.7	+3.5
Majority		2,894	8.5	+3.6
Turnout		34,369	80.9	−1.5
Plaid Cymru hold		Swing	+1.7	

General election 1979: Caernarvon
Party	Candidate	Votes	%	±%
Plaid Cymru	Dafydd Wigley	17,420	49.7	+7.1
Labour	Thomas Merfyn Hughes	8,696	24.8	−9.3
Conservative	James Edward Thornton Paice	6,968	19.9	+7.3
Liberal	John Trevor Edwards	1,999	5.7	−5.0
Majority		8,724	24.9	+16.4
Turnout		35,083	81.5	+0.6
Plaid Cymru hold		Swing	+8.2	

=== Elections in the 1980s ===
General election 1983: Caernarfon
Party	Candidate	Votes	%	±%
Plaid Cymru	Dafydd Wigley	18,308	52.7	+3.0
Conservative	Dennis Jones	7,319	21.1	+1.2
Labour	Betty Williams	6,736	19.4	−5.4
Liberal	Owain Griffiths	2,356	6.8	+1.1
Majority		10,989	31.6	+6.7
Turnout		34,719	78.6	−2.9
Plaid Cymru hold		Swing		

General election 1987: Caernarfon
Party	Candidate	Votes	%	±%
Plaid Cymru	Dafydd Wigley	20,338	57.1	+4.4
Conservative	Felix Aubel	7,526	21.1	0.0
Labour	David Williams	5,652	15.9	−3.5
Liberal	John Parsons	2,103	5.9	−0.9
Majority		12,812	36.0	+4.4
Turnout		35,619	78.0	−0.6
Plaid Cymru hold		Swing		

=== Elections in the 1990s ===
General election 1992: Caernarfon
Party	Candidate	Votes	%	±%
Plaid Cymru	Dafydd Wigley	21,439	59.0	+1.9
Conservative	Peter E.H. Fowler	6,963	19.2	−1.9
Labour	Sharon Mainwaring	5,641	15.5	−0.4
Liberal Democrats	Robert W. Williams	2,101	5.8	−0.1
Natural Law	Gwyndaf Evans	173	0.5	New
Majority		14,476	39.8	+3.8
Turnout		36,317	80.1	+2.1
Plaid Cymru hold		Swing	+1.9	

General election 1997: Caernarfon
Party	Candidate	Votes	%	±%
Plaid Cymru	Dafydd Wigley	17,616	51.0	−8.0
Labour	Eifion Wyn Williams	10,167	29.5	+14.0
Conservative	Elwyn Williams	4,230	12.3	−6.9
Liberal Democrats	Mary Macqueen	1,686	4.9	−0.9
Referendum	Clive Collins	811	2.4	New
Majority		7,449	21.5	−18.3
Turnout		34,510	73.7	−6.4
Plaid Cymru hold		Swing	−11.2	

=== Elections in the 2000s ===
General election 2001: Caernarfon
Party	Candidate	Votes	%	±%
Plaid Cymru	Hywel Williams	12,894	44.4	−6.6
Labour	Martin Eaglestone	9,383	32.3	+2.8
Conservative	Bronwen Naish	4,403	15.2	+2.9
Liberal Democrats	Evan Ab-Owain	1,823	6.3	+1.4
UKIP	Ifor Lloyd	550	1.9	New
Majority		3,511	12.1	−9.6
Turnout		29,053	62.0	−11.7
Plaid Cymru hold		Swing	−4.7	

General election 2005: Caernarfon
Party	Candidate	Votes	%	±%
Plaid Cymru	Hywel Williams	12,747	45.5	+1.1
Labour	Martin Eaglestone	7,538	26.9	−5.4
Liberal Democrats	Evan Ab-Owain	3,508	12.5	+6.2
Conservative	Guy Opperman	3,483	12.4	−2.8
UKIP	Elwyn Williams	723	2.6	+0.7
Majority		5,209	18.6	+6.5
Turnout		27,999	60.4	−1.6
Plaid Cymru hold		Swing	+3.3	

== See also ==
- 1890 Caernarvon Boroughs by-election
- 1945 Caernarvon Boroughs by-election
- List of parliamentary constituencies in Gwynedd

== Sources ==
- Boundaries of Parliamentary Constituencies 1885–1972, compiled and edited by F. W. S. Craig (Parliamentary Reference Publications 1972)
- British Parliamentary Constituencies: A Statistical Compendium, by Ivor Crewe and Anthony Fox (Faber and Faber 1984)
- British Parliamentary Election Results 1832–1885, compiled and edited by F.W.S. Craig (The Macmillan Press 1977)
- F. W. S. Craig, British Parliamentary Election Results 1885 – 1918
- F. W. S. Craig, British Parliamentary Election Results 1918 – 1949
- British Parliamentary Election Results 1950–1973, compiled and edited by F.W.S. Craig (Parliamentary Research Services 1983)
- The House of Commons 1509–1558, by S.T. Bindoff (Secker & Warburg 1982)
- The House of Commons 1558–1603, by P.W. Hasler (HMSO 1981)
- The House of Commons 1715–1754, by Romney Sedgwick (HMSO 1970)
- The House of Commons 1754–1790, by Sir Lewis Namier and John Brooke (HMSO 1964)
- The Parliaments of England by Henry Stooks Smith (1st edition published in three volumes 1844–50), second edition edited (in one volume) by F.W.S. Craig (Political Reference Publications 1973)

Parliament of the United Kingdom
Preceded by Fife East	Constituency represented by the chancellor of the Exchequer; 1908–1915	Succeeded by Monmouthshire North
Preceded by Fife East	Constituency represented by the prime minister 1916–1922	Succeeded by Glasgow Central
Preceded by Liverpool Scotland	Constituency represented by the father of the House; 1929–1945	Succeeded by Horsham
