= Maurice Davis (disambiguation) =

Maurice Davis was a rabbi.

Maurice Davis may also refer to:

- Maurice Davis (judge), politician and judge from Saint Kitts
- Maurice Davis (trumpeter)
- Maurice Davis (athlete) in 1986 CARIFTA Games

== See also ==
- Maurice Davies (disambiguation)
- Morris Davis (disambiguation)
