= David Price-White =

Member of Parliament (1906–1978)

Lieutenant-Colonel David Archibald Price-White, TD (5 September 1906 – 6 March 1978) was a Welsh solicitor and Conservative Party politician. He served as the Member of Parliament (MP) for Caernarvon Boroughs from 1945 to 1950.

== Early life ==
His mother was Charlotte Bell (later Charlotte Price White), a suffrage pioneer, local councillor and activist while his father, Price Foulkes White (1873–1952) was an engineer at the Bangor Electrical Company and Welsh international footballer. David Price-White was educated in Bangor, first at Friars School and then at the University College of North Wales, before qualifying as a solicitor in 1932. He joined the Territorial Army in 1928 and became a second lieutenant in the Royal Artillery (Territorial Army). By 1939 he had been promoted to Major. During World War II he served with the British Army in France (at Dunkirk), the Middle East, Italy and East Africa. By 1944 he was a Lieutenant Colonel.

== Political career ==
Price-White was a local councillor in the Caernarfonshire County Council from 1939 until 1941, and also a member of the Bangor City Council. He was elected at the general election in July 1945 as the MP for Caernarvon Boroughs. His victory by a narrow margin of 336 votes ousted the Liberal MP Seaborne Davies, who had won the seat at a by-election in April that year, after long-serving David Lloyd George had been elevated to the peerage.

When constituency boundaries were revised for the 1950 general election, Price-White stood in the new Conway county constituency, where he was defeated by the Labour Party candidate William Elwyn Jones.

== Later career ==
Price-White worked as a solicitor until 1956 when he was struck off by the Disciplinary Committee of the Law Society, who found he had failed to comply with Solicitors Accounts Rules and had been guilty of conduct unbefittig a solicitor in six respects (as reported in detail in the Western Mail 9 June 1956. There was a break during the Second World War. In 1957 he was appointed to a position within the national electricity supply industry, as Principal Assistant at the Central Electricity Generating Board, Midland Regions Headquarters. He resumed practice as a solicitor in 1968 until his death in 1978.

== Personal life ==
In 1934, Price-White married Gwyneth Harris, daughter of James Lewis Harris of Caernarvon and they had two children, a boy (Andrew Stewart) and a girl (Carolyn Mary). The family lived in Meirion Lane, Bangor until Price-White and his wife Gwyneth separated. He lived later at Colwyn Bay.

He died 6 March 1978.

Parliament of the United Kingdom
Preceded by Seaborne Davies	Member of Parliament for Caernarvon Boroughs; July 1945 – 1950	Succeeded by Goronwy Roberts
