= 1911 Arfon by-election =

By-election in the United Kingdom

The 1911 Arfon by-election was a parliamentary by-election held on 11 February 1911 for the Arfon division in Caernarvonshire in North Wales, a constituency of the British House of Commons. It was the first by-election to be held after the December 1910 general election.

The by-election was held because the sitting Liberal Member of Parliament (MP) William Jones had been appointed as a Junior Lord of the Treasury in H. H. Asquith's Liberal government, and until the 1920s MPs appointed to positions in government had to seek re-election. Jones had held the seat since the 1895 general election, and at the by-election he was re-elected unopposed.

Jones died in 1915, triggering another by-election

1911 Arfon by-election
Party	Candidate	Votes	%	±%
Liberal	William Jones	Unopposed		
Registered electors				
Liberal hold				

== Sources ==
- Craig, F. W. S. (1989) [1974]. British parliamentary election results 1885–1918 (2nd ed.). Chichester: Parliamentary Research Services. p. 469. ISBN 0-900178-27-2.
- Leigh Rayment's Historical List of MPs
