= Robert Gruffydd =

Welsh politician

Robert Gruffydd (by 1515 – 1575 or later) was the member of Parliament for the constituency of Caernarfon in the parliaments of 1545 and 1558.
