= Charlotte Price White =

Welsh activist and politician

- Born: Charlotte Bell; 1873; Briggart, Scotland
- Died: 1932 (aged 58–59); Bangor, Wales
- Known for: Suffragist; local councillor

Charlotte Price White (1873–1932) was a leading member of the North Wales Suffragist movement, local councillor and among the first British members of the Women's Institute.

== Education and personal life ==
Charlotte Bell was born in Briggart near Dumfries in Scotland in 1873. In the 1890s she was among the first women to train as science teachers at University College of North Wales, Bangor. Her first teaching post was in London. On 12 August 1902 she married Price Foulkes White. They lived in Bangor where she remained for the rest of her life. They had two children, Margaret and David Archibald.

She died suddenly in 1932, and her funeral was a public event. Flags were flown at half-mast and there were over 100 floral tributes at the service in the English Presbyterian Chapel.

== Activism ==
White was Secretary and leader of the Bangor branch of the National Union of Women’s Suffrage Societies. She walked to London in the Great Pilgrimage of 1913. Descriptions that appeared in several contemporary newspapers of this journey via Llanfairfechan and Stafford were probably based on her account.

When the Women's Institute started in the UK in 1915 with a branch at Llanfairpwll, White became a member.

During the First World War she was secretary of a North Wales committee that raised money for a Welsh hospital unit within the Scottish Women's Hospitals for Foreign Service in Serbia. She later organised the education of a refugee Serbian boy at University College of North Wales.

In 1926 she was the first woman to become a member of Caernarfonshire County Council. She was also important in the North Wales Women’s International League for Peace and Freedom, and especially the ‘Peace Pilgrimage’ of 1926.

== Legacy ==
White was included among the Women's Equality Network Wales list of women who have made significant contributions to national life.

In 2021 a Purple Plaque was installed at 50 Upper Garth Road, Bangor where she lived for most of her life.
