= Seaborne Davies =

British politician and teacher (1904–1984)

Member of Parliament for Caernarvon Boroughs
- In office 26 April 1945 – 15 June 1945
- Preceded by: David Lloyd George
- Succeeded by: David Price-White

Personal details
- Born: 26 June 1904 Pwllheli, Caernarfonshire, Wales
- Died: 26 October 1984 (aged 80)
- Party: Liberal

David Richard Seaborne Davies (26 June 1904 – 26 October 1984) was a Welsh law teacher who served briefly as a Liberal Party member of parliament (MP).

== Early life ==
Davies was born in Pwllheli, and attended the local grammar school followed by University College, Aberystwyth. He went on to St John's College, Oxford.

== Political career ==
When David Lloyd George was given a Peerage after 55 years representing Caernarvon Boroughs, Davies was chosen as the Liberal Party candidate to follow him. He faced a contest against Plaid Cymru but won the 1945 Caernarvon Boroughs by-election, taking his seat just as the Second World War was coming to an end in Europe.

Unfortunately for Davies, the end of the war brought a swift dissolution to Parliament and he lost his seat to the Conservative Party in the 1945 general election. He had one of the shortest tenures as a Member of Parliament during the Twentieth Century, in contrast to his predecessor who was one of the longest of all time.

== Later life ==
After his defeat, Davies was appointed to the Chair of Common Law in the Faculty of Law at the University of Liverpool. He was also Warden of Derby Hall. This position allowed him to take several public appointments, including as a member of the Criminal Law Revision Committee where his advice in relation to the law of dishonesty led to a significant reform in the Theft Act 1968.

His academic position also helped him to publish significant works on the history of patents, and he was President of the Society of Public Teachers of Law in 1960–61. In 1962 he was the Cooley Lecturer at the University of Michigan. Within Liverpool University he was Public Orator from 1950 to 1955, and Pro-Vice-Chancellor from 1956 to 1960. The Faculty of Law building at Liverpool was largely built at his instigation.

After retirement in 1971, Davies moved to Caernarfon where he indulged his interest in Rugby union (he had been Life President of Liverpool University Rugby Football Club and Vice President of London Welsh RFC, and became President of Pwllheli Sports Club for ten years. He served as a Magistrate in both Liverpool and Caernarfon, and was High Sheriff of Caernarvonshire in 1967–68.

Davies was a great after-dinner speaker, regaling his audience with a large fund of Welsh anecdotes suitable for any audience. He was also interested in Welsh culture and was President of the National Eisteddfod of Wales in 1955, 1973 and 1975.

== See also ==
List of United Kingdom MPs with the shortest service

- UK by-election records

Parliament of the United Kingdom
| Preceded by David Lloyd George | Member of Parliament for Caernarvon Boroughs; April 1945–July 1945 | Succeeded by David Price-White |
