= Edward Griffiths =

Edward Griffiths may refer to:

- Edward Griffiths (politician) (1929–1995), British Labour politician
- Edward Griffiths (cricketer) (1862–1893), English cricketer
- Eddie Griffiths (1891–1980), Australian fire fighter
- Eddie Griffiths (Hollyoaks)

== See also ==
- Edward Griffith (disambiguation)
