= Caradoc Rees =

Welsh lawyer, Liberal Party politician and judge

Member of Parliament for Arfon
- In office 6 July 1915 – 14 December 1918
- Preceded by: William Jones
- Succeeded by: Constituency abolished

Personal details
- Born: Griffith Caradoc Rees; 13 April 1868 Birkenhead, Cheshire, UK
- Died: 20 September 1924 (aged 56) Colwyn Bay, Clwyd, UK
- Party: Coalition Liberal
- Other political affiliations: Liberal Party
- Parents: Griffiths Rees (father); Sarah (mother)
- Education: Liverpool Institute
- Occupation: Lawyer and Judge

Griffith Caradoc Rees (13 April 1868 – 20 September 1924) was a Welsh lawyer, Liberal Party politician and later a judge.

== Early life and career ==
Rees was born in Birkenhead, the son of Griffiths Rees of Cilgerran in Cardiganshire and his wife Sarah from Llangynog, Montgomeryshire. He was educated at Liverpool Institute.

Rees went in for the law. He qualified as a solicitor and practised from 1895 to 1905. He was then called to the bar by the Middle Temple. In 1921 he was made a county court judge on the North Wales circuit. During his career he gained a reputation for his sound understanding of the law and for being humane judge.

== Political career ==
Always a committed Liberal, Rees first stood for election to Parliament in the December 1910 general election. As Liberal candidate in the Denbigh Boroughs he lost by a margin of only 9 votes to the sitting Conservative MP, William Ormsby-Gore.

However, William Jones, the Liberal MP for the Arfon division of Caernarvonshire, died in May 1915, and Rees was elected unopposed at the resulting by-election on 6 July 1915. He held the seat until the constituency was abolished at the 1918 general election, and did not stand for Parliament again.

During his time as an MP, Rees served briefly as Parliamentary Secretary for the Home Office. Although he was not a candidate at the 1918 Coupon election, he is credited with being one of the framers of the Coalition Liberal manifesto for that contest along with Herbert Fisher, Frederick Guest and Robert Munro.

== Personal life and death ==
Rees never married and died in Colwyn Bay on Saturday 20 September 1924 aged 56 years.

Parliament of the United Kingdom
Preceded by William Jones	Member of Parliament for Arfon; 1915 – 1918	Constituency abolished
