= Edmund Swetenham =

British barrister and Conservative Party politician (1822–1890)

Edmund Swetenham QC
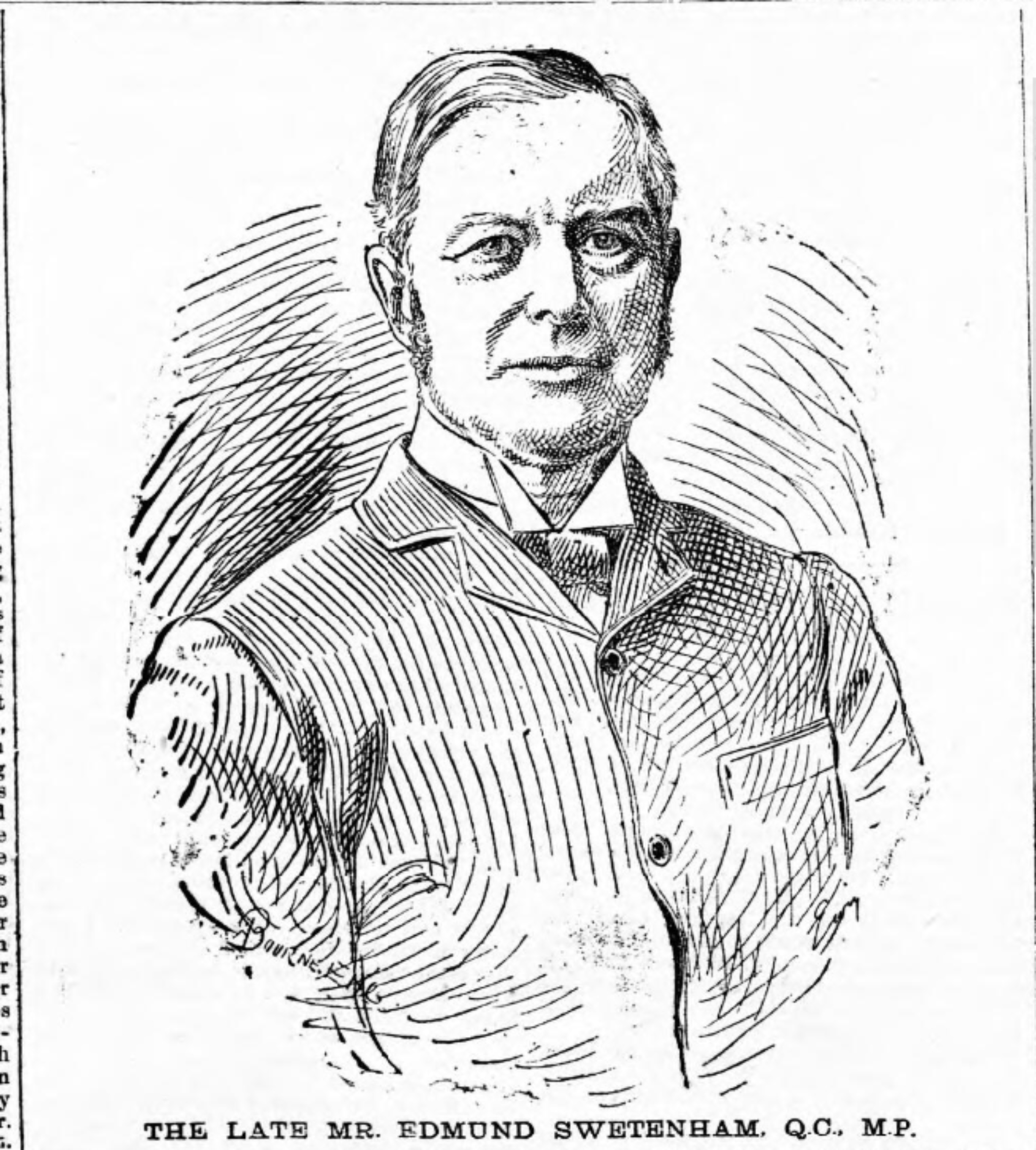
- A posthumous sketch of Swetenham
- Born: 15 November 1822; Somerford Booths, England
- Died: 19 March 1890 (aged 67); Rossett, Wales
- Education: BA (1844), MA (1845), Brasenose College, Oxford
- Occupation: Barrister,
- Years active: 1848
- Organization(s): Lincoln's Inn Fields; North Wales region of the Wales and Chester Circuit
- Known for: QC, and MP for Caernarfon
- Political party: Conservative Party
- Spouse(s): Elizabeth Jane (1851–1866); Gertrude Cunliffe (1867–1876)
- Children: 5
- Parents: Clement Swetenham (father); Eleanor Swetenham (née Buchanan) (mother)

Edmund Swetenham QC (15 November 1822 – 19 March 1890) was a British barrister and Conservative Party politician.

== Early life ==
Swetenham was born in Somerford Booths, Cheshire, in 1822, to Clement Swetenham, a gentleman, of Sumerford Booths Hall, and his wife Eleanor (née Buchanan).

He studied at Macclesfield Grammar School and Brasenose College, Oxford, and was called to the bar in 1848.

== Career ==
=== Barristerial work ===
Swetenham was called to the Bar at Lincoln's Inn in 1848 and chose to work in the North Wales region of the Wales and Chester Circuit. He became one of the most prominent barristers in the region, defending or prosecuting in many of the most famous cases of his time, including defending railway employees charged with manslaughter after the Abergele Railway disaster in 1869.

He famously prosecuted publisher Thomas Gee for libel. Gee had revealed in his newspaper The Flag that a local farmer had voted for the Conservative Party in the General Election of that year, and this led to the eviction of the farmer from his property in protest.

Swetenham also defended the Dolgellau man Cadwaladr Jones in 1877, who stood accused of murdering his girlfriend. Jones went on to be hung.

He was promoted to Queen's Counsel (QC) in 1880.

=== Political career ===
At the 1885 General Election, Swetenham stood in the Caernarfon Boroughs constituency for the Conservatives, losing by 65 votes. He stood again in the 1886 General Election, being elected by a majority of 136 votes against Liberal MP Sir Love Jones-Parry, who was incumbent.

== Personal life ==
He was twice married, first in 1851 to Elizabeth Jane, daughter of Wilson Jones. Jones was from Hartsheath Park, Mold, and was the former MP 1835–1841 for Denbigh Boroughs. Edmund and Elizabeth had one son and two daughters.

Swetenham remarried in 1867. He married Gertrude, daughter of Ellis Cunliffe of Acton Park, Wrexham. They had one son and one daughter; Gertrude died in 1876.

Parliament of the United Kingdom
Preceded by Love Jones-Parry	Member of Parliament for Caernarvon Boroughs; 1886—1890	Succeeded by David Lloyd George
