= Nicholas Griffith =

Welsh Member of Parliament

Nicholas Griffith (c. 1573 – ?), of Plas Mawr, Caernarvonshire, was a Welsh Member of Parliament for Caernarvon Boroughs in 1601 and 1614.
