= 1890 Caernarvon Boroughs by-election =

UK parliamentary by-election

- 10 April 1890
- Turnout: 89.5%
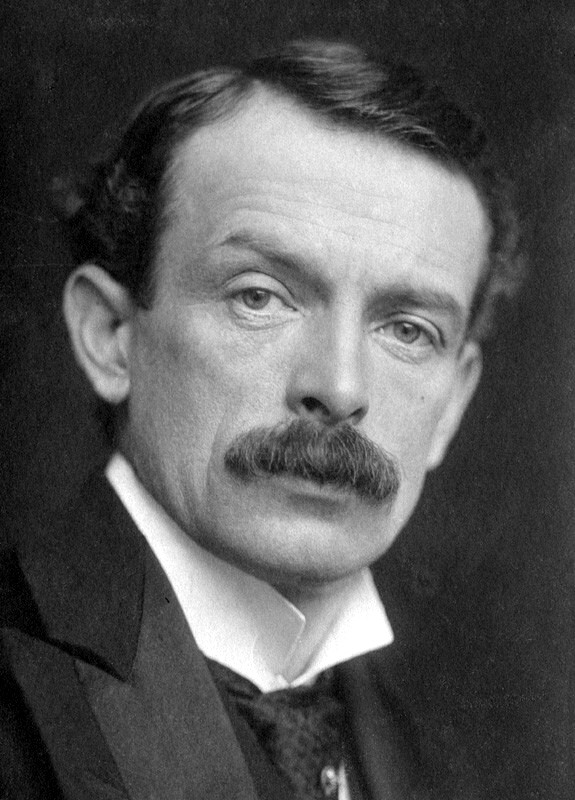

	First party	Second party
Candidate	David Lloyd George	Hugh Ellis-Nanney
Party	Liberal	Conservative
Popular vote	1,963	1,945
Percentage	50.2%	49.8%
Swing	▲2.1%	▼2.1%
MP before election
Edmund Swetenham
Conservative
Subsequent MP
David Lloyd George
Liberal

The 1890 Caernarvon Boroughs by-election was a parliamentary by-election held on 10 April 1890 for the British House of Commons constituency of Caernarvon Boroughs.

== Previous MP ==
The seat had become vacant when the previous Conservative Member of Parliament (MP), Edmund Swetenham died. Swetenham (1822 – 19 March 1890) was a barrister who had contested the seat in 1885 and been elected its MP in 1886.

== Candidates ==
Two candidates were nominated. The list below is set out in descending order of the number of votes received at the by-election.

1. The Liberal Party candidate, David Lloyd George (17 January 1863 – 26 March 1945) was a local solicitor from Criccieth (one of the six boroughs in the district). In 1890 he was an ambitious young man, aged 27, whose political and legal work had made him well known in all parts of the constituency. He had become an Alderman of Caernarvonshire County Council, when it was established in 1889.

Subsequent to the by-election Lloyd George had a long and distinguished political career. He served in many high offices, notably as Chancellor of the Exchequer 1908-1915 and Prime Minister of the United Kingdom 1916-1922. He led the Liberal Party, after the retirement of H. H. Asquith, from 1926 to 1931. Lloyd George continued to represent the Boroughs from 1890 until he was elevated to the peerage as the 1st Earl Lloyd George of Dwyfor in February 1945.

2. Representing the Conservative Party was a local landowner, the squire of Llanystumdwy, Hugh Ellis-Nanney. He was a popular figure locally, but his health was poor and he was a reluctant candidate. Ellis-Nanney had previously contested the county seats of Caernarvonshire in 1880 and Eifion in 1885. After the by-election he contested Caernarvon Boroughs again in the 1895 general election.

== Constituency and Campaign ==
The constituency was a district of six boroughs, located in different parts of the county of Caernarvonshire, in north west Wales.

The area had a reputation, since 1832, as a middle of the road constituency. It was not known as a particularly radical seat. However, since the extension of the franchise in 1885, most parts of Wales had become more supportive of the Liberal Party. Liberal support tended to be associated with religious nonconformity and the Conservative voters were more likely to be Anglican in religion.

Lloyd George had a strong political appeal to his fellow nonconformists. He had become well known by taking up high-profile legal actions, addressing nonconformist grievances. By the standards of the era, David Lloyd George was a Welsh nationalist. Lloyd George hoped to use the national issue to appeal beyond his nonconformist base. However this issue was more popular in South Wales than in the north. The North Wales Liberal Federation was hesitant over Home Rule for Wales. Tom Ellis thought Lloyd George's support for it reduced his majority at the by-election.

In January 1889, the local Liberal Association selected Lloyd George as their prospective Parliamentary candidate. His rival for the selection, Arthur Humphreys-Owen, had called Lloyd George "a second rate country attorney". The MP for the Caernarvonshire county division of Arfon (William Rathbone) thought that Lloyd George's nomination would lead to the loss of the seat.

When the by-election was called the Conservative Party had difficulty finding a candidate. A number of possible local nominees (including the eventual candidate Hugh Ellis-Nanney) declined the chance to contest the seat. It seemed that an outside barrister would be selected, but this possibility came to nothing, as the local Tories would not promise support in the following general election. Eventually Ellis-Nanney was persuaded to contest the seat.

Lloyd George secured funding of about £250, for the by-election, from a local Methodist.

Lloyd George issued an election address, on 24 March 1890, in which he supported the standard Gladstonian position on Irish Home Rule but devoted more space to Welsh grievances.

As a campaign tactic, Conservative speakers contrasted the local focus of Ellis-Nanney, with the scale of Lloyd George's talents and national interests. A contrast was drawn between the wealthy Tory landowner and the Liberal from a lower social strata.

Lloyd George, demonstrating his considerable oratorical skills, ridiculed the Conservative arguments. He pointed out that politics had moved on since the 17th century, so it was no longer sufficient for an MP just to be wealthy. In a long remembered phrase, the Liberal candidate referred to the age of the cottage bred candidate.

Lloyd George toured the constituency non-stop, speaking in a different part of it each night.

The three smallest boroughs (Criccieth, Nevin and Pwllheli) were the most agricultural and strongly Liberal parts of the seat. In a close election, this support was to prove decisive for the Criccieth-based candidate - Lloyd George. The Anglican cathedral city of Bangor was the most strongly Conservative part of the seat. Caernarvon itself and Conway were more doubtful and evenly divided towns.

The election count was tense, as it was soon apparent that the result would be close. At first, it seemed Ellis-Nanney would be elected, but it was found that a parcel of Liberal votes had been put in the wrong pile. Eventually David Lloyd George was declared elected by a margin of 18 votes.

== Result ==
1890 Caernarvon Boroughs by-election
Party	Candidate	Votes	%	±%
Liberal	David Lloyd George	1,963	50.2	+2.1
Conservative	Hugh Ellis-Nanney	1,945	49.8	−2.1
Majority		18	0.4	N/A
Turnout		3,908	89.5	+11.2
Registered electors		4,366		
Liberal gain from Conservative		Swing	+2.1	

== Previous election ==
General election 1886: Caernarvon Boroughs
Party	Candidate	Votes	%	±%
Conservative	Edmund Swetenham	1,820	51.9	+2.8
Liberal	Love Jones-Parry	1,684	48.1	−2.8
Majority		136	3.8	N/A
Turnout		3,504	78.3	−6.2
Registered electors		4,476		
Conservative gain from Liberal		Swing	+2.8	

== See also ==
- Caernarvon Boroughs constituency
- List of United Kingdom by-elections
- United Kingdom by-election records

== Sources ==
- Boundaries of Parliamentary Constituencies 1885-1972, compiled and edited by F.W.S. Craig (Parliamentary Reference Publications 1972)
- British Parliamentary Election Results 1832-1885, compiled and edited by F.W.S. Craig (Macmillan Press 1977)
- British Parliamentary Election Results 1885-1918, compiled and edited by F.W.S. Craig (Macmillan Press 1974)
- British Parliamentary Election Results 1918-1949, compiled and edited by F.W.S. Craig (Macmillan Press 1977)
- Lloyd George, by Peter Rowland (Barrie & Jenkins 1975)
- Social Geography of British Elections 1885-1910. by Henry Pelling (Macmillan 1967)
- The Young Lloyd George, by John Grigg (Eyre Methuen 1973; reprinted with corrections 1978, 1985)
- Wales in British Politics 1868-1922, by Kenneth O. Morgan (University of Wales Press, 3rd edition 1980)
- Who's Who of British Members of Parliament: Volume I 1832-1885, edited by M. Stenton (The Harvester Press 1976)
- Who's Who of British Members of Parliament, Volume II 1886-1918, edited by M. Stenton and S. Lees (Harvester Press 1978)
- Who's Who of British Members of Parliament, Volume III 1919-1945, edited by M. Stenton and S. Lees (Harvester Press 1979)
