= William Bulkeley Hughes =

British politician

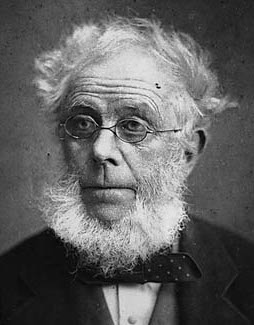
William Bulkeley Hughes by the photographer John Thomas

William Bulkeley Hughes J.P. (26 July 1797 – 8 March 1882) was a Welsh politician who sat in the House of Commons from 1837 to 1859 and 1865 to 1882. He was elected for Member of Parliament for Carnarvon Boroughs constituency.

Hughes was the eldest son of Sir William Bulkeley Hughes of Plas Coch, Llanidan, Anglesey and Elizabeth, of Coed Alun, Caernarfon. He was educated at Harrow School and called to the bar at Lincoln's Inn in 1824.

== Public life ==
As a prospector in railway shares, Bulkeley-Hughes made significant gains in the 1840s. In 1850, Bulkeley-Hughes had organised a banquet for Robert Stephenson to commemorate the opening of the Britannia Bridge. Bulkeley-Hughes was the chairperson of the Anglesey Central Railway from its founding until it was absorbed by the London and North Western Railway in 1876. As a politician, Bulkeley-Hughes was Justice of the peace of Anglesey and Caernarvonshire, and became sheriff of Anglesey in 1861.

== Politics ==
Bulkeley-Hughes was initially elected as a Conservative of Caernarfon (UK Parliament constituency) in 1837, during the election, Bulkeley-Hughes contested against and beat Charles Paget (Royal Navy officer), brother of the Marquess of Anglesey. For nearly 40 years he was M.P. in parliament with a short hiatus between 1859 – 1865. Bulkeley-Hughes was re-elected as MP for Carnarvon Boroughs as a Liberal in 1865 and held the seat until his death in 1882, and aged 84 "was in point of age the 'father' of the House of Commons". He is buried in the churchyard of St Edwen's Church, Llanedwen, Anglesey.

In 1846 Bulkeley-Hughes sided with the pro-Free Trade wing of the party led by Sir Robert Peel who became known as the Peelites. Hughes appears to have left the Peelites by 1859 as he stood as a 'Liberal' in the 1859 general election but lost to a Conservative. A few weeks later the Peelites merged with Radicals and Whigs to create the Liberal Party.

== Family ==
Hughes married first Elizabeth Wormald, daughter of Jonathan Nettleship of Mattersey Abbey near Bawtry and widow of Harry Wormald in 1825. He married second Elizabeth Donkin, daughter of William Donkin, in 1866. His only child, Lady Sarah Elizabeth married Charles Hunter-Hughes in 1876, who became the Baronet of Plâs Côch of the Hughes family estate in Llanedwen, Anglesey, north Wales.

Parliament of the United Kingdom
Preceded by Sir Love Jones-Parry	Member of Parliament for Carnarvon; 1837–1859	Succeeded by Charles Wynne
Preceded by Charles Wynne	Member of Parliament for Carnarvon; 1865–1882	Succeeded by Love Jones-Parry
Preceded by Thomas Bazley	Oldest Member of Parliament? (not Father of the House); 1880–1882	Succeeded by Michael Thomas Bass
