= William Jones (Arfon MP) =

British politician

Member of Parliament for Arfon
- In office 13 July 1895 – 9 May 1915
- Preceded by: William Rathbone
- Succeeded by: Caradoc Rees

Junior Lord of the Treasury
- In office 1911–1915

Personal details
- Born: c. March 1860 Penmynydd, Anglesey
- Died: May 9, 1915 (aged 55) Bangor, Caernarfonshire
- Party: Liberal
- Education: Bangor Normal College, University College of Wales

William Jones (1860 – 9 May 1915) was a British Liberal Party politician.

== Early history ==
Jones was born in Penmynydd in 1860, the son of William, a peasant farmer and Jane. The Dictionary of Welsh Biography lists his parents as Richard and Alice. His father died when he was a child, and the family subsequently moved into Llangefni. He was educated first at the British school at Llangefni, later becoming the pupil-teacher there. He continued his education at Bangor Normal College and the University College of Wales, Aberystwyth He briefly served as headmaster of the Goginan School north of Cardigan, before working for the London School Board from 1879-88.

In 1887 he was excommunicated from the Welsh Calvinistic Methodist Church at Holloway for "advocating too advanced opinions as a Sunday school teacher." From 1888-94 he worked as a private tutor at Oxford. While there, he befriended Sir John Rhys.

== Political career ==
After developing an interest in politics while in London he sought candidacy in Anglesey, as a Liberal but was not chosen. Instead, Jones entered the House of Commons as Liberal MP for Arfon in the 1895 general election. He was re-elected in 1900 and in 1906. In parliament he supported the 1908 Women's Enfranchisement Bill. He was re-elected in January and December 1910. In 1911 he was appointed to the Liberal administration of H. H. Asquith as a government whip. He died in office in May 1915.

== Electoral results ==
General election 1895: Arfon
Party	Candidate	Votes	%	±%
Liberal	William Jones	4,488	61.1	n/a
Conservative	Prof. A W Hughes	2,860	38.9	n/a
Majority		1,628	22.2	n/a
Turnout			83.3	n/a
Liberal hold		Swing	n/a	

General election 1906: Arfon
Party	Candidate	Votes	%	±%
Liberal	William Jones	5,945	70.1	n/a
Conservative	Arthur E Hughes	2,533	29.9	n/a
Majority		3,412	40.2	n/a
Turnout			85.2	n/a
Liberal hold		Swing	n/a	

General election January 1910: Arfon
Party	Candidate	Votes	%	±%
Liberal	William Jones	6,223	70.3	
Conservative	Arthur E Hughes	2,629	29.7	
Majority		3,594	40.6	
Turnout				
Liberal hold		Swing		

Parliament of the United Kingdom
Preceded by William Rathbone	Member of Parliament for Arfon; 1895 – 1915	Succeeded by Caradoc Rees
Political offices
Preceded by Oswald Partington; John Gulland; William Wedgwood Benn; Ernest Soares; Percy Illingworth	Junior Lord of the Treasury; 1911–1915; With: John Gulland 1911–1915; William Wedgwood Benn 1911–1915; Ernest Soares 1911; Percy Illingworth 1911–1912; Freddie Guest 1911–1912; Arthur Haworth 1912; Henry Webb 1912–1915; Cecil Beck 1915; Walter Rea 1915	Succeeded by William Wedgwood Benn; Henry Webb; Cecil Beck; Walter Rea
