= Maurice Davies (MP) =

16th-century Welsh politician

Maurice Davies was the member of Parliament for the constituency of Caernarfon for the parliament of 1559.
