= Edward Griffith (MP) =

Edward Griffith (fl. 1584), of Plas Mawr, Caernarvon and Trefarthen, Anglesey, was an Welsh Member of Parliament (MP).

He was a Member of the Parliament of England for Caernarvon Boroughs in 1584.
