= Hywel Williams =

Welsh politician (born 1953)

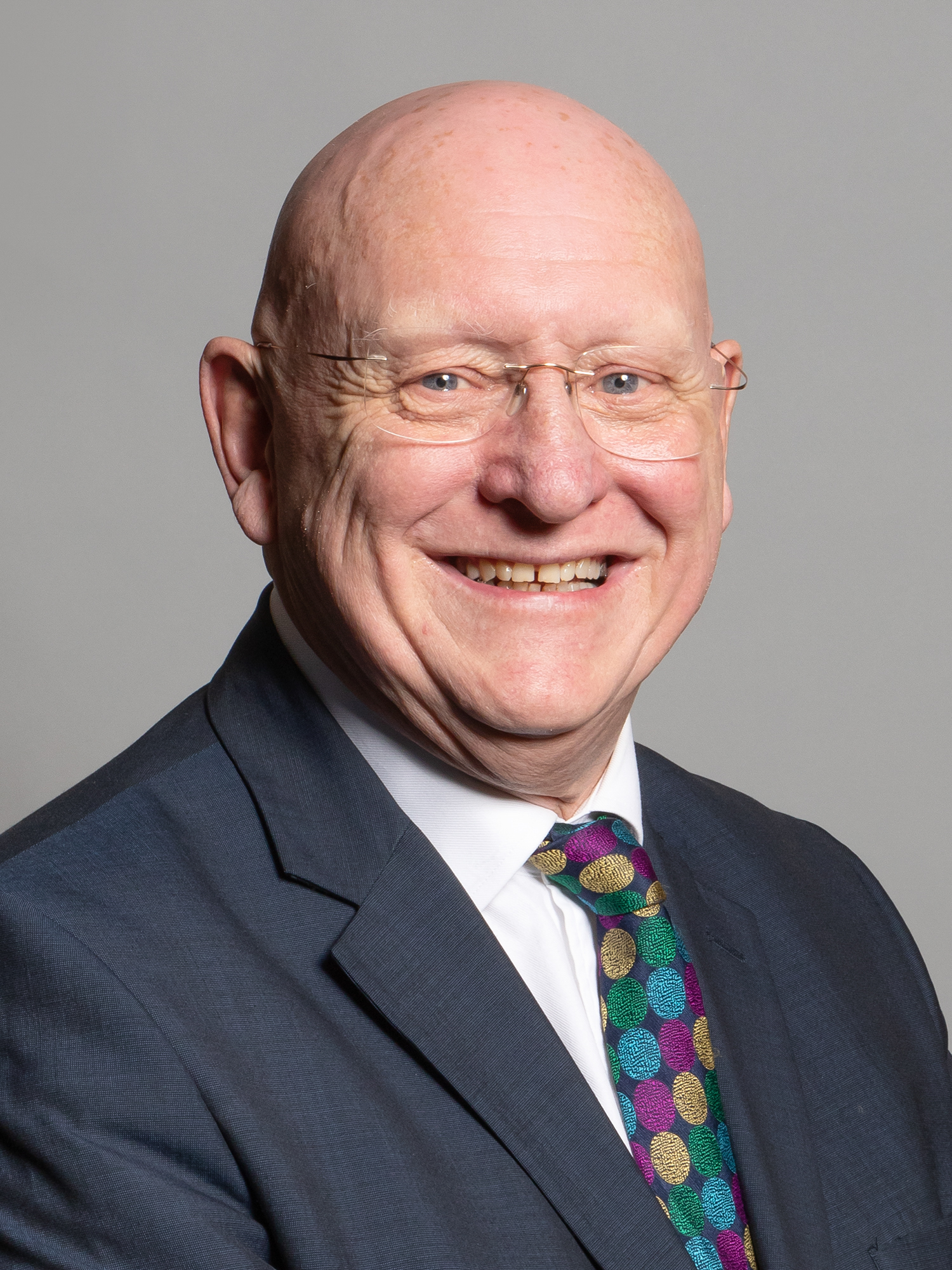
- Official portrait, 2020

Member of Parliament for Arfon Caernarfon (2001–2010)
- In office 7 June 2001 – 30 May 2024
- Preceded by: Dafydd Wigley
- Succeeded by: Constituency abolished

Leader of Plaid Cymru in the House of Commons
- In office 10 September 2015 – 14 June 2017
- Leader: Leanne Wood
- Preceded by: Jonathan Edwards
- Succeeded by: Liz Saville Roberts

Personal details
- Born: Hywel Williams; 14 May 1953 (age 73) Pwllheli, Caernarfonshire, Wales
- Party: Plaid Cymru
- Education: University College of South Wales and Monmouthshire (now Cardiff University)

Hywel Williams (born 14 May 1953) is a Welsh Plaid Cymru politician who served as the Member of Parliament (MP) for Arfon, previously Caernarfon, from 2001 to 2024.

== Early life ==
Hywel Williams was born in Pwllheli in 1953, and went to school at Pwllheli Grammar School and then Ysgol Glan y Môr.

He studied Psychology at the University College of South Wales and Monmouthshire (now Cardiff University) before qualifying as a social worker at University College of North Wales (now Bangor University) in 1977/78. He was a mental health social worker in the Dwyfor area before joining the Centre for Social Work Practice at the University of Wales, Bangor in 1985.

Williams was a project worker at the centre, specialising in developing practice through the medium of Welsh, developing a host of short courses available in Welsh for the first time, as well as producing and editing numerous books and training packages with his colleagues, including the first ever social work vocabulary in Welsh. He was appointed Head of the Centre in 1993.

In 1995, Williams left to work as a freelance lecturer, consultant and writer in the fields of social policy, social work, and social care, working primarily in Welsh. For the next six years, he worked for a variety of universities and colleges in Wales and abroad, as well as working for public bodies, charities, private companies and local and central government, including spending time as an adviser to the House of Commons Welsh Affairs Committee.

He has been a member of numerous professional bodies in relation to social work and training, and was also spokesman for the Child Poverty Action Group in Wales.

== Political career ==
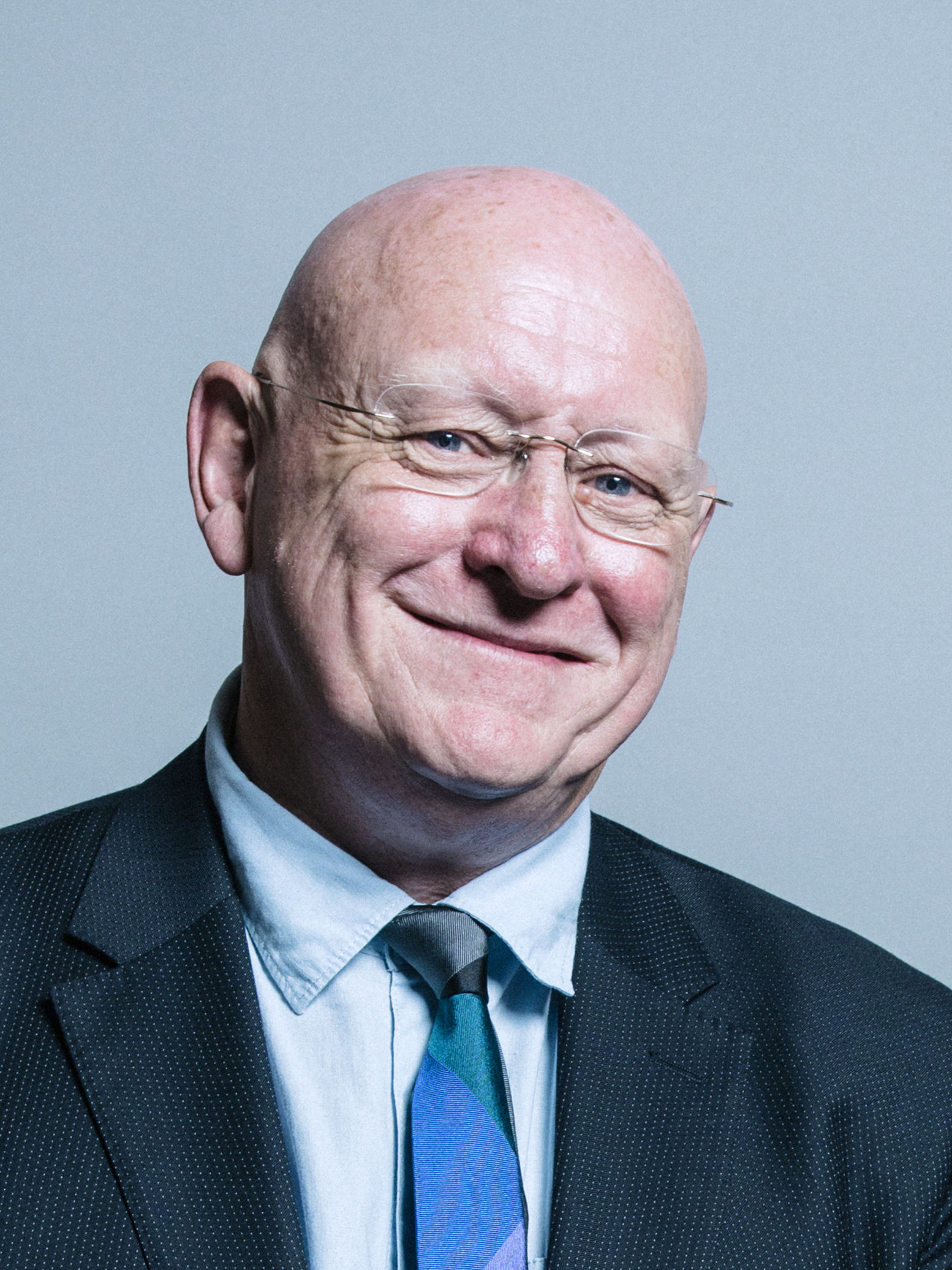
Williams in 2017

At the 2001 general election, Williams was elected as the Plaid Cymru MP for Caernafon, winning with 44.4% of the vote and a majority of 3,511. He was re-elected as MP for Caernafon at the 2005 general election with an increased vote share of 45.5% and an increased majority of 5,209.

In 2005 he joined the Panel of Chairs. This role involves chairing backbench debates, standing committees on legislation, committees on secondary legislation and from time to time, meetings of the whole House as a Committee in the main chamber.

In 2010 the constituency of Caernafon was replaced by the new constituency of Arfon. Williams was elected as MP for the new constituency of Arfon at the 2010 general election, winning with 36% of the vote and a majority of 1,455. He was re-elected as MP for Arfon at the 2015 general election with an increased vote share of 43.9% and an increased majority of 3,668.

He served as leader of Plaid Cymru in Westminster from September 2015 until June 2017. At the snap 2017 general election, Williams was again re-elected, with a decreased vote share of 40.8% and a decreased majority of 92.

In March 2019, he voted for an amendment tabled by members of The Independent Group calling for a second public vote on EU membership.

Williams was again re-elected at the 2019 general election, with an increased vote share of 45.2% and an increased majority of 2,781.

In November 2022, Williams announced that he would not seek re-election as an MP at the 2024 general election.

His parliamentary responsibilities within Plaid Cymru are work and pensions, defence, international development and culture.

In December 2023 Williams was a member of the team for Bangor University which participated in BBC's Christmas University Challenge. The team lost to Middlesex University in the semi-final.

Parliament of the United Kingdom
Preceded by Dafydd Wigley	Member of Parliament for Caernarfon; 2001–2010	Constituency abolished
New constituency	Member of Parliament for Arfon; 2010–2024	Constituency abolished
