= Edward Littleton, 1st Baron Lyttelton =

English peer (1589-1645)

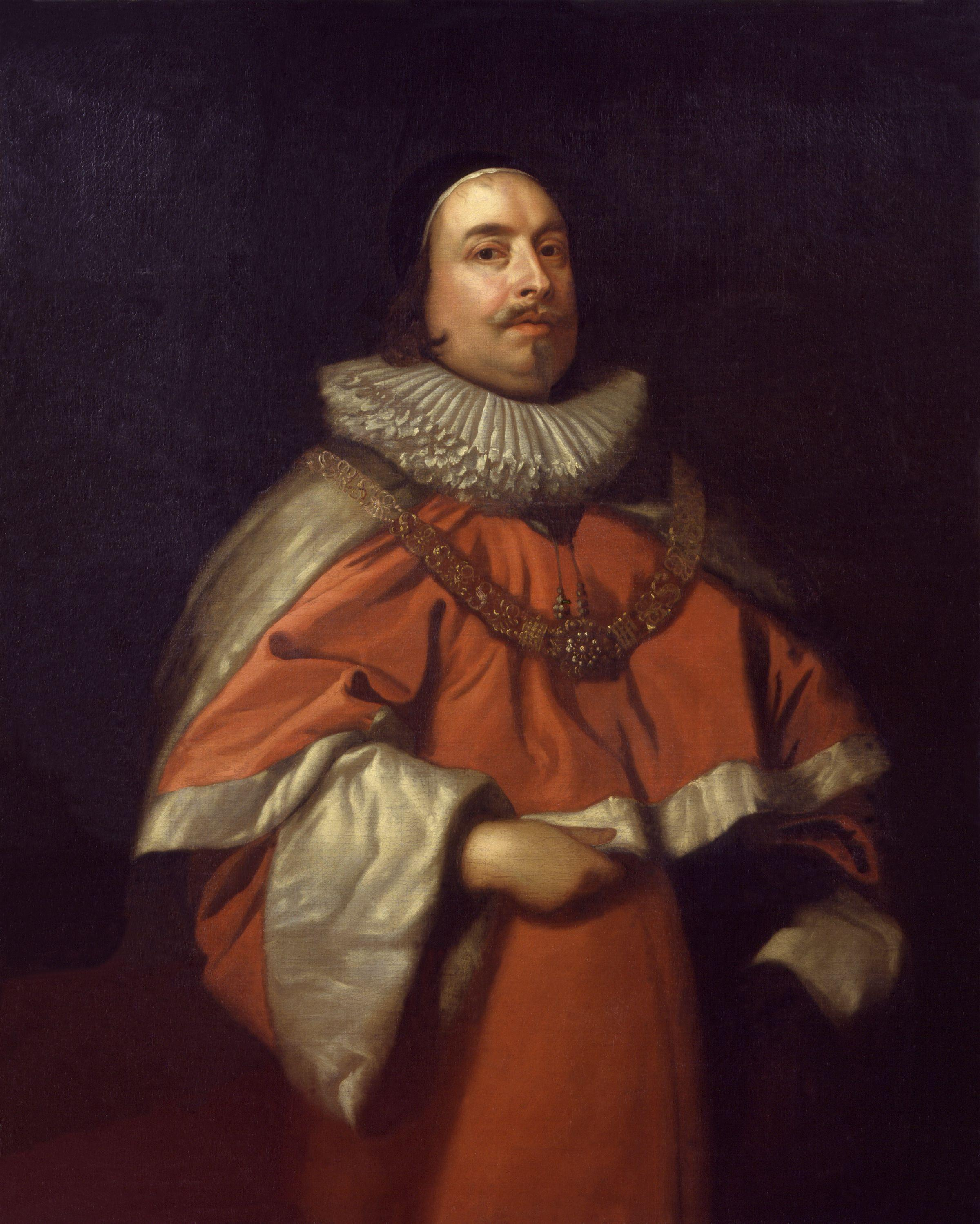
A 1640 portrait of Edward Littleton, possibly after Anthony van Dyck

Edward Littleton, 1st Baron Lyttleton (also Littelton; 1589 – 27 August 1645), from Munslow in Shropshire, was a Chief Justice of North Wales. He was descended from the judge and legal scholar, Thomas de Littleton. His father, also Edward, had been Chief Justice of North Wales before him.

== Education and career ==
He was educated at Oxford before becoming a lawyer. In 1614 he became an MP for Bishop's Castle, Shropshire in the Addled Parliament. In 1625 he was again returned to Parliament for Leominster and Caernarfon borough. In 1628 he was chairman of the Committee of Grievances upon whose report the Petition of Right was based.

As a member of the party opposed to the arbitrary measures of Charles I, Littleton had shown more moderation than some of his colleagues, and in 1634, three years after he had been chosen Recorder of London, the king attached him to his own side by appointing him Solicitor General. In the famous case about ship money, Sir Edward argued against John Hampden. In 1640, he was made Chief Justice of the Common Pleas.

== The Great Seal ==
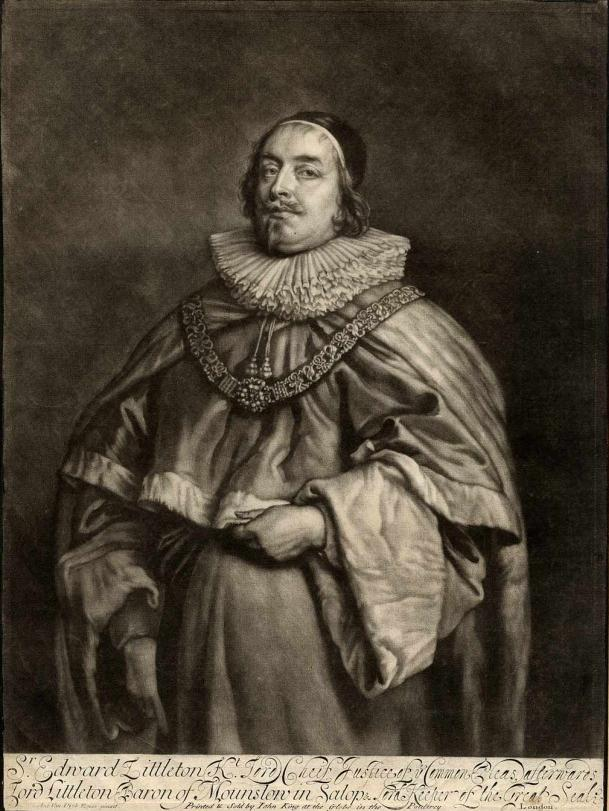
An 18th century mezzotint of Littleton, after Van Dyck

In 1641, when the previous keeper, John Finch, fled into exile, Littleton was appointed Lord Keeper of the Great Seal. He was raised to the Peerage as Baron Lyttelton of Munslow.

As the Lord Keeper Littleton had begun to display a certain amount of indifference to the royal cause. In January 1642, he refused to put the Great Seal to the proclamation for the arrest of five members and he also incurred the displeasure of Charles by voting for the Militia ordinance. However, he assured his friend Edward Hyde, afterwards Earl of Clarendon, that he had only taken this step to allay the suspicions of the parliamentary party who contemplated depriving him of the seal, and he undertook to send this to the King. He fulfilled his promise, and in May 1642, he himself joined Charles at York, but it was some time before he regained the favour of the king and the custody of the seal.

== Death ==
Littleton died at Oxford on 27 August 1645; he left no sons and his barony became extinct. His only daughter, Anne, married her cousin, Sir Thomas Littleton, 2nd Baronet. Their son, Sir Thomas Littleton (c. 1647–1710), was Speaker of the House of Commons from 1698 to 1700, and Treasurer of the Navy from 1700 to 1710.

== Notes ==
Legal offices
Preceded by Sir John Finch	Chief Justice of the Common Pleas; 1640–1641	Succeeded by Sir John Bankes
Political offices
Preceded by William Juxon	First Lord of the Treasury; 1641–1643	Succeeded by The Lord Cottington
Preceded by John Finch	Lord Keeper; 1641–1645	Succeeded by Sir Richard Lane
Peerage of England
New creation	Baron Lyttelton; 1641–1645	Extinct
