= Henry Robins (MP) =

16th-century Welsh politician

Henry Robins (by 1515 – 1562 or later), of Caernarvon, was a Welsh politician.

He was a member (MP) of the parliament of England for Caernarvon Boroughs in October 1553 and April 1554.
