= Arfon (UK Parliament constituency) =

UK Parliament constituency (2010–2024)

- Former county constituency for the House of Commons
- Boundary of Arfon in Wales for the 2010 general election
- Preserved county: Gwynedd
- Electorate: 39,349 (December 2018)

2010–2024
- Seats: One
- Created from: Caernarfon and Conwy
- Replaced by: Bangor Aberconwy, Dwyfor Meirionnydd

1885–1918
- Created from: Caernarvonshire
- Replaced by: Caernarvonshire, Carnarvon Boroughs
- Senedd: Arfon, North Wales

Arfon was a constituency in Wales represented in the House of Commons of the UK Parliament at Westminster. (Note: As with all constituencies, the constituency elects one Member of Parliament (MP) by the first past the post system of election at least every five years.) Although it is relatively large by geographical area, the constituency is a predominantly urban rather than rural seat, with the majority of the population living in the two towns of Bethesda and Caernarfon, as well as in the city of Bangor, on which the constituency is based. "Arfon" is a historical name for the area, meaning "facing Anglesey"; it is also the name of the former district council. This seat was created by the Welsh Boundary Commission in time for the 2010 general election; it replaced the old seat of Caernarfon. Bangor was in the old seat of Conwy. The same boundaries were used for the Arfon Welsh Assembly constituency in the 2007 Welsh Assembly election.

Prior to its abolition, it was the smallest constituency on the mainland of Great Britain by electorate, and larger only than the two Scottish island constituencies, Na h-Eileanan an Iar and Orkney and Shetland. The total population as of the 2011 census was 60,573.

The Arfon division of Caernarvonshire was a former UK Parliament constituency, which existed from 1885 until 1918. Before 1885 and after 1918 the area was part of the Caernarvonshire constituency. The Liberal MP William Rathbone represented the Arfon seat until 1895, followed by fellow Liberal William Jones. Upon the death of Mr Jones, Griffith C. Rees, for the Liberal Party, was elected unopposed at the subsequent by-election.

On 11 November 2022, the then current MP Hywel Williams announced his intention to stand down at the 2024 general election after more than 20 years as MP.

The constituency was abolished as part of the 2023 Periodic Review of Westminster constituencies and under the June 2023 final recommendations of the Boundary Commission for Wales. Its wards were split between Bangor Aberconwy and Dwyfor Meirionnydd.

== Boundaries ==
Map of boundaries 2010-2024

When first created in 1885, the constituency was defined as the Petty Sessional Divisions of Bangor, Conway and Nant-Conway, with the Parishes of Llanddeiniolen and Llanberis (which were within the Carnarvon Petty Sessional Division). The constituency included the boroughs of Bangor and Conway which were part of the Carnarvon District of Boroughs constituency; only those who owned freehold land within the boroughs could vote in elections for the Arfon constituency as a second vote.

The new constituency was a merger of northern Caernarfon and western Conwy. The electoral wards used to create the current constituency are entirely within the preserved county of Gwynedd; They are Arllechwedd, Bethel, Bontnewydd, Cadnant, Cwm-y-Glo, Deiniol, Deiniolen, Dewi, Garth, Gerlan, Glyder, Groeslon, Hendre, Hirael, Llanberis, Llanllyfni, Llanrug, Llanwnda, Marchog, Menai (Bangor), Menai (Caernarfon), Ogwen, Peblig, Penisarwaun, Pentir, Penygroes, Seiont, Talysarn, Tregarth and Mynydd Llandygai, Waunfawr and Y Felinheli.

== Demographics ==
=== Welsh language ===
Welsh is the main language spoken in Arfon, and it has the highest percentage of people who can speak a Celtic language of any constituency in the world. As of June 2024, 84.8% of residents over the age of three could understand spoken Welsh, including 96.8% of those who were born in Wales.

== Electoral history ==
The latest boundary change created a battleground in Arfon particularly for Labour, Plaid Cymru, and the Conservatives, with the latter being labelled as a 'resurgent' party by the Caernarfon Herald. The scale of contention had been reached due to the large shift in boundary changes which in turn created a need within each party to achieve a relatively unforeseen outcome. Plaid Cymru had previously never represented Bangor, which had been held by Conservative Wyn Roberts for twenty-seven years and a further thirteen under Labour's Betty Williams. It had however also been more than thirty years since Caernarfon had been represented by anyone other than Plaid Cymru.

In the event, Plaid gained the seat (which had been notionally Labour) in 2010 and held it in 2015; their victory in 2017 was by just 92 votes, the tightest margin in Wales in that election.

== Members of Parliament ==
=== MPs 1885–1918 ===
Election	Member	Party
1885	William Rathbone	Liberal
1895	William Jones	Liberal
1915 by-election	Caradoc Rees	Liberal
1916	Caradoc Rees	Coalition Liberal
1918	constituency abolished	

=== MPs since 2010 ===
Election	Member	Party
2010	Hywel Williams	Plaid Cymru
2024	Constituency abolished	

== Elections ==
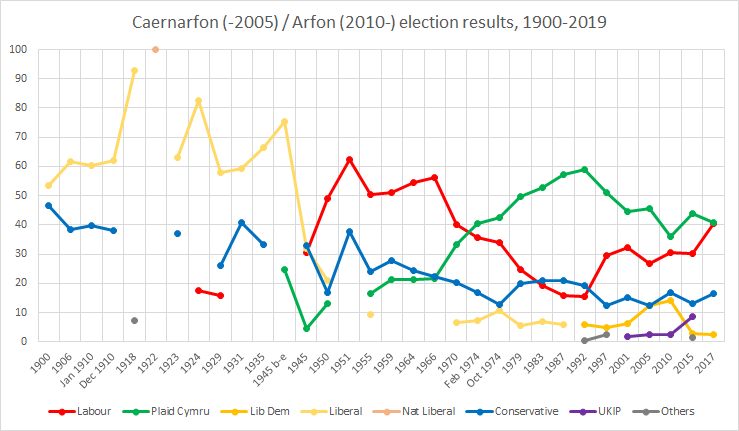
Election results since 1900

=== Elections 1885–1918 ===
==== Elections in the 1880s ====
General election 1885: Arfon
Party	Candidate	Votes	%	±%
Liberal	William Rathbone	4,562	61.6	N/A
Conservative	Henry Platt	2,838	38.4	N/A
Majority		1,724	23.2	N/A
Turnout		7,400	81.0	N/A
Registered electors		9,136		
Liberal win (new seat)				

General election 1886: Arfon
Party	Candidate	Votes	%	±%
Liberal	William Rathbone	4,072	58.0	−3.6
Conservative	Henry Platt	2,950	42.0	+3.6
Majority		1,122	16.0	−7.2
Turnout		7,022	76.9	−4.1
Registered electors		9,136		
Liberal hold		Swing	-3.6	

==== Elections in the 1890s ====
General election 1892: Arfon
Party	Candidate	Votes	%	±%
Liberal	William Rathbone	Unopposed		
Registered electors				
Liberal hold				

General election 1895: Arfon
Party	Candidate	Votes	%	±%
Liberal	William Jones	4,488	61.1	N/A
Conservative	Alfred William Hughes	2,860	38.9	N/A
Majority		1,628	22.2	N/A
Turnout		7,348	83.3	N/A
Registered electors		8,821		
Liberal hold		Swing	N/A	

==== Elections in the 1900s ====
General election 1900: Arfon
Party	Candidate	Votes	%	±%
Liberal	William Jones	Unopposed		
Registered electors				
Liberal hold				

William Jones

General election 1906: Arfon
Party	Candidate	Votes	%	±%
Liberal	William Jones	5,945	70.1	N/A
Conservative	Arthur E. Hughes	2,533	29.9	N/A
Majority		3,412	40.2	N/A
Turnout		8,478	85.2	N/A
Registered electors		9,948		
Liberal hold		Swing	N/A	

==== Elections in the 1910s ====
General election January 1910: Arfon
Party	Candidate	Votes	%	±%
Liberal	William Jones	6,223	70.3	+0.2
Conservative	Arthur E. Hughes	2,629	29.7	−0.2
Majority		3,594	40.6	+0.4
Turnout		8,852	87.2	+2.0
Registered electors		10,153		
Liberal hold		Swing	+0.2	

General election December 1910: Arfon
Party	Candidate	Votes	%	±%
Liberal	William Jones	Unopposed		
Registered electors		10,153		
Liberal hold				

1911 Arfon by-election
Party	Candidate	Votes	%	±%
Liberal	William Jones	Unopposed		
Registered electors				
Liberal hold				

1915 Arfon by-election
Party	Candidate	Votes	%	±%
Liberal	Caradoc Rees	Unopposed		
Registered electors				
Liberal hold				

=== Elections in the 21st century ===
==== Elections in the 2010s ====
General election 2010: Arfon
Party	Candidate	Votes	%	±%
Plaid Cymru	Hywel Williams*	9,383	36.0	N/A
Labour	Alun Pugh	7,928	30.4	N/A
Conservative	Robin Millar	4,416	16.9	N/A
Liberal Democrats	Sarah Green	3,666	14.1	N/A
UKIP	Elwyn Williams	685	2.6	N/A
Majority		1,455	5.6	N/A
Turnout		26,078	63.3	N/A
Registered electors		41,198		
Plaid Cymru win (new seat)				

*Served as MP for the predecessor seat of Caernarfon in the 2001-2010 Parliament

General election 2015: Arfon
Party	Candidate	Votes	%	±%
Plaid Cymru	Hywel Williams	11,790	43.9	+7.9
Labour	Alun Pugh	8,122	30.3	−0.1
Conservative	Anwen Barry	3,521	13.1	−3.8
UKIP	Simon Wall	2,277	8.5	+5.9
Liberal Democrats	Mohammed Shultan	718	2.7	−11.4
Socialist Labour	Kathrine Jones	409	1.5	N/A
Majority		3,668	13.6	+8.0
Turnout		26,837	66.3	+3.0
Registered electors		40,492		
Plaid Cymru hold		Swing	+4.0	

General election 2017: Arfon
Party	Candidate	Votes	%	±%
Plaid Cymru	Hywel Williams	11,519	40.8	−3.1
Labour	Mary Clarke	11,427	40.5	+10.2
Conservative	Philippa Parry	4,614	16.4	+3.3
Liberal Democrats	Calum Davies	648	2.3	−0.4
Majority		92	0.3	−13.3
Turnout		28,208	68.2	+1.9
Registered electors		41,367		
Plaid Cymru hold		Swing	-6.7	

General election 2019: Arfon
Party	Candidate	Votes	%	±%
Plaid Cymru	Hywel Williams	13,134	45.2	+4.4
Labour	Steffie Williams Roberts	10,353	35.6	−4.9
Conservative	Gonul Daniels	4,428	15.2	−1.2
Brexit Party	Gary Gribben	1,159	4.0	N/A
Majority		2,781	9.6	+9.3
Turnout		29,074	68.9	+0.7
Registered electors		42,215		
Plaid Cymru hold		Swing	+4.6	

== See also ==
- Arfon (Senedd constituency)
- List of parliamentary constituencies in Gwynedd
- List of parliamentary constituencies in Wales
