= 1915 Arfon by-election =

UK parliamentary by-election

The 1915 Arfon by-election was a parliamentary by-election held on 6 July 1915 for the Arfon division of Caernarvonshire in North Wales, a constituency of the British House of Commons.

The by-election was caused by death at the age of 55 of the Liberal Member of Parliament (MP) William Jones, a Junior Lord of the Treasury in H. H. Asquith's Liberal government, who had held the seat since the 1895 general election.

The only candidate nominated to contest the by-election was the Liberal Caradoc Rees, who was therefore elected unopposed. Rees, who was a solicitor, held the seat until the constituency was abolished at the general election in December 1918 and was later appointed as a judge.

1915 Arfon by-election
Party	Candidate	Votes	%	±%
Liberal	Caradoc Rees	Unopposed		
Registered electors				
Liberal hold				

== See also ==
- Arfon (UK Parliament constituency)
- 1911 Arfon by-election
- Caernarvonshire
- List of United Kingdom by-elections

== Sources ==
- Craig, F. W. S. (1989) [1974]. British parliamentary election results 1885–1918 (2nd ed.). Chichester: Parliamentary Research Services. p. 469. ISBN 0-900178-27-2.
- Leigh Rayment's Historical List of MPs
