= Rhys Gruffydd =

Sir Rhys Gruffydd (by 1513 – 30 July 1580) was the member of Parliament for the constituency of Caernarfon for the parliaments of November 1554 and 1555.

Rhys was the son of Sir William Gruffydd, a member of the Griffiths of Penrhyn, chamberlain of Wales, and his wife, Sian Stradling. He was paternal descendant of Welsh magnate Gwilym ap Griffith. Rhys was said to have spent much of his early life in London. He was also celebrated by Welsh poets William Cynwal and Sion Brwynog for his military prowess in the Irish wars.

On the death of his elder brother Edward Gruffydd, he disputed the inheritance of the family estate with the maternal grandfather of Edward's daughters, Sir John Puleston. After initially succeeding in his claim, the ruling was invalidated and arbitration resulted in a ruling for partition, but the land dispute continued beyond the deaths of both men. He retained the familial seat of Penrhyn, Anglesey, and the local status that came with being its lord.

Being one of the first justices of the shire, he was knighted at the 1547 coronation of Edward VI. Having been unsuccessfully nominated as sheriff in 1547 and 1548. The 1551 death of his adversary, Puleston, removed an incumberance to him occupying higher office, and in 1554, he took the Parliamentary seat for Caernarfon burroughs, and in 1555 attended Parliament as knight of the shire for Caernarfonshire, and he served as Sheriff of Caernarfonshire in 1566-7. His Catholicism was probably behind his exclusion from the House of Commons during the reign of Elizabeth I.

Rhys married three times: to Margaret, daughter of Morris ap John ap Meredydd of Clenennau; to Jane, daughter of Dafydd ap William ap Gruffydd of Cochwillan, the widow of Robert Owen; and by 1568 to Catherine Mostyn, daughter of Peter Mostyn of Talacre. He sold Penrhyn during his lifetime, and upon his death on 30 July 1580, the heir to his remaining property was his 12-year-old son Peter, the eldest child of his third marriage.
