= Morris Davies =

Welsh poet

Morris Davies, (bardic name: Meurig Ebrill; 1780 – 26 September 1861), was a Welsh poet from the Dolgellau area of mid Wales. As a young man, he worked as an apprentice to a carpenter, and later worked in some of the larger houses in the area, such as Dolserau, Nannau, Hengwrt and Caerynwch.

== Interest ==
He had developed an interest in poetry at a young age, and was possibly quite influenced by his meeting with Thomas Edwards (Twm o'r Nant) at the age of 13. In 1853, he began publishing his own work (including a number of englynion and carols) on various subjects, often dealing with local occurrences: Diliau Meirion (1853) – followed in 1854 by a second part (with a preface by Griffith Griffiths); Hanes Teithiau a Helyntion Meurig Ebrill gyda 'Diliau Meirion’ o Ddolgellau i Gaerlleon-Gawr, Birkenhead, Llynlleifiad, a Manceinion, a'i Ddychweliad yn ol Drwy Siroedd a Threfydd Gogledd Cymru yn 1854–55 (1855).

He died in September 1861.
