= Llandygai =

Village in Gwynedd, Wales

Llandygai: Welsh: Llandygái
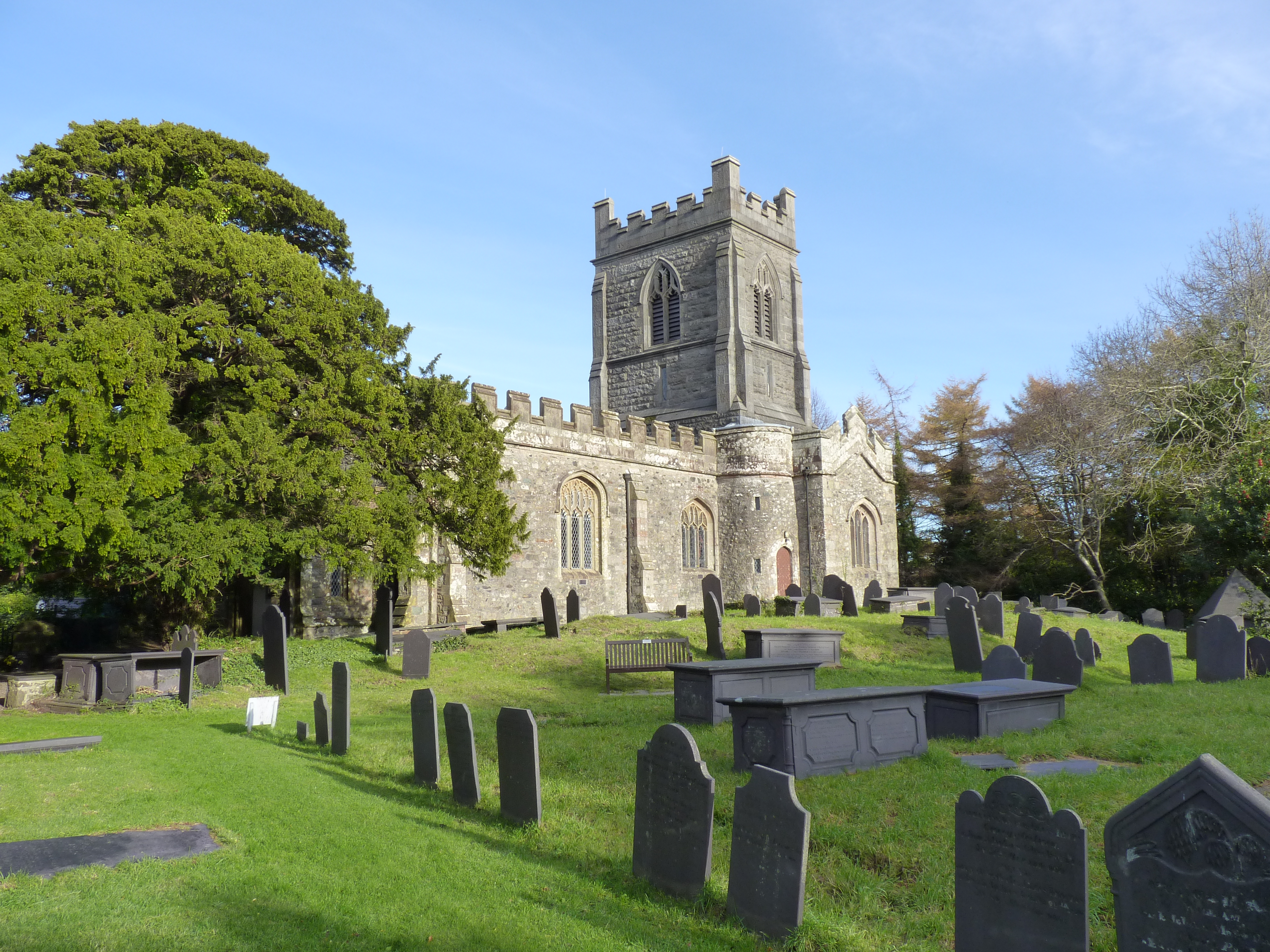
- Church of St Tegai

- Location within Gwynedd
- Population: 2,487 (2011)
- OS grid reference: SH597708
- Community: Llandygai
- Principal area: Gwynedd
- Country: Wales
- Sovereign state: United Kingdom
- Post town: BANGOR
- Postcode district: LL57
- Dialling code: 01248
- Police: North Wales
- Fire: North Wales
- Ambulance: Welsh
- UK Parliament: Bangor Aberconwy
- Senedd Cymru – Welsh Parliament: Arfon
- List of places UK Wales Gwynedd 53.216°N 4.101°W Map of the community

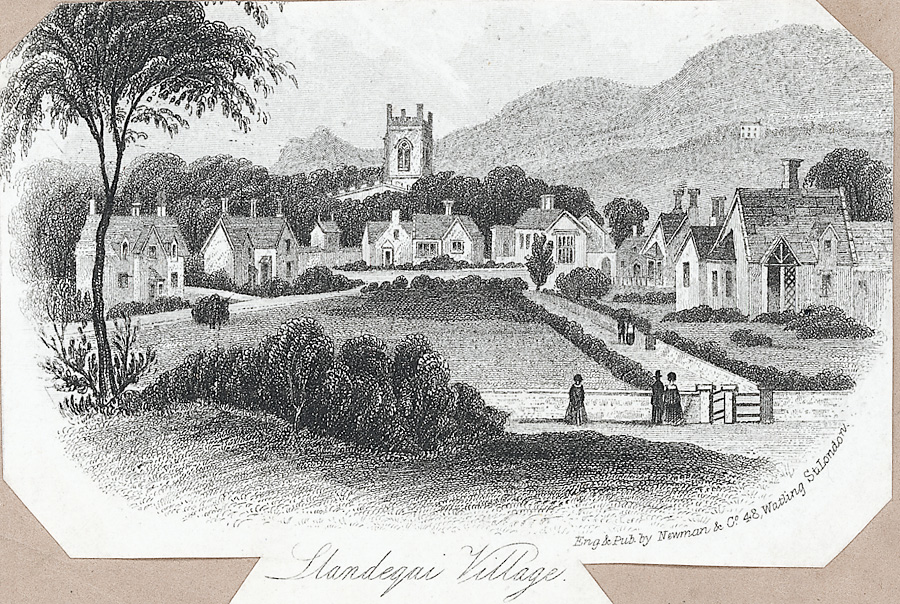
Llandegai Village, 1855

Llandygai (Welsh: Llandygái, Welsh: [ɬandɛ'ɡai]; Welsh pronunciation; also Llandegai) is a small village and community on the A5 road between Bangor and Talybont in Gwynedd, Wales. It affords a view of the nearby Carneddau mountain range. The population of the community taken at the 2011 Census was 2,487. Llandygai community includes nearby Tregarth and Mynydd Llandygai and also the pass of Nant Ffrancon.

== Prehistory ==
There is evidence of human occupation of this site from Neolithic times.

Excavations in the 1960s at the site of the current Industrial Estate uncovered two large henge monuments and a series of hengiform pit circles from the late Neolithic period. Excavations in 2006 and 2007 at the Bryn Cegin site (extending the industrial estate) found an early Neolithic house and later, possibly Romano-British, settlement

== History ==
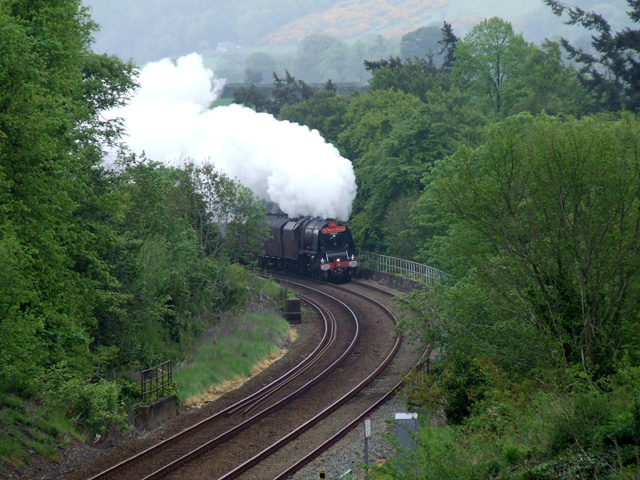
Steam train taking the bend prior to entering the tunnel at Llandegai

In 1648 during the English Civil War the Battle of Y Dalar Hir was fought near Llandygai. Royalist forces of 150 horse and 120 foot soldiers led by Sir John Owen engaged Parliamentarian forces led by Colonel Carter and Colonel George Twistleton.

The village of Llandygai is recorded at the beginning of the nineteenth century as consisting of eight or nine houses. The village was later developed by quarry owner The 1st Baron Penrhyn (1800–1886) as a ‘model village’ for his estate workers, in which ‘no corrupting alehouse’ was permitted. It lies immediately outside of the walls of the Penrhyn Castle demesne walls, with the entrance to the village being some 100 yards (91 m) from the castle's Grand Lodge. Lord Penrhyn, a Scottish aristocrat, had inherited the Penrhyn Estate from his father-in-law, George Hay Dawkins-Pennant (1764–1840), in 1840.

This model village was mostly constructed in the 1840s in a ‘vernacular revival’ style which conformed to the Picturesque ideal. The model village was built within the loop of the road to Conwy from where it branched off Telford’s newly built Holyhead to London road. Each house was built in a similar style but none was to be identical. They were furnished with ample gardens and the layout was such that no house’s front door faced another.

== Llandygai Church ==
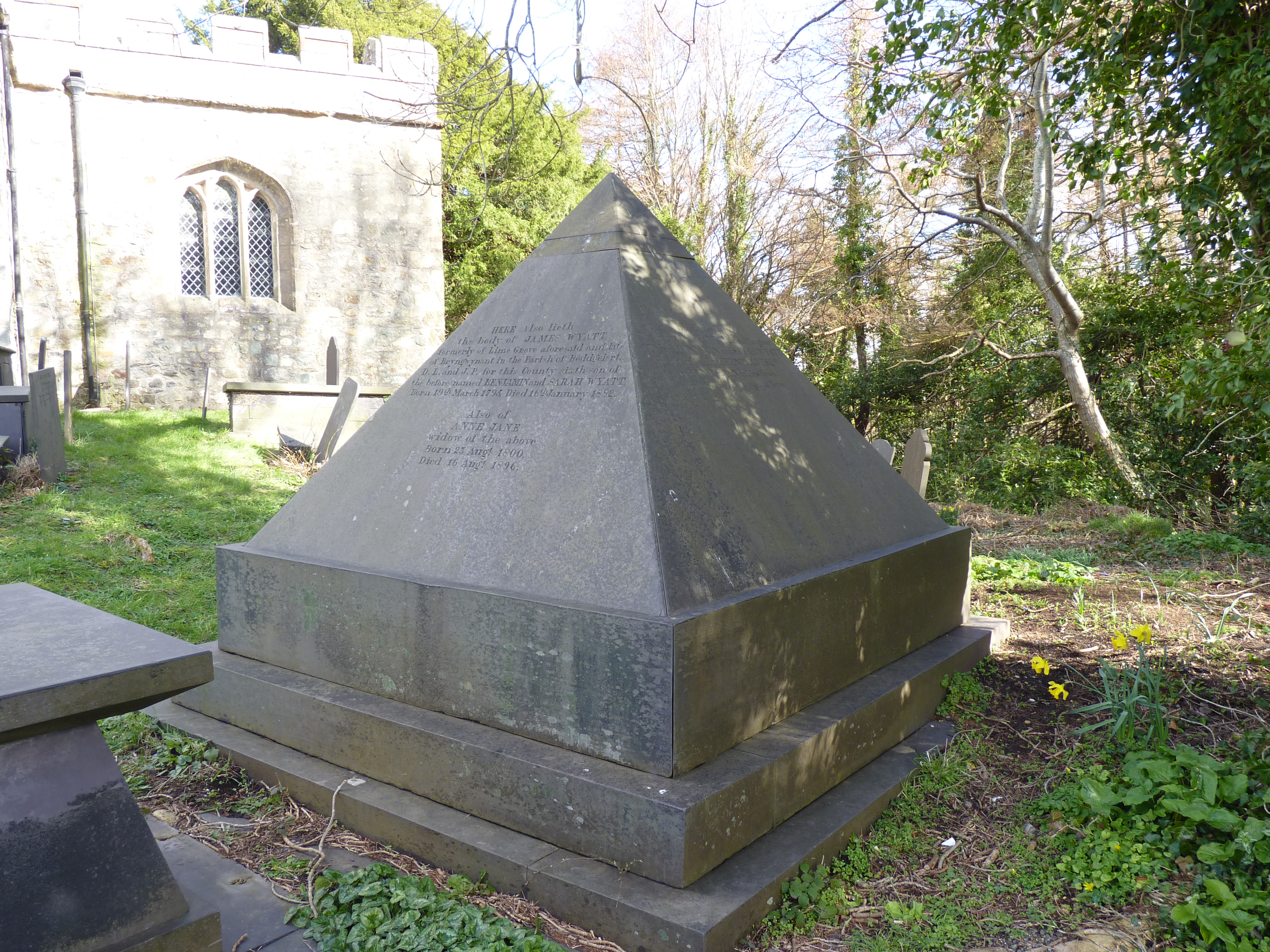
Wyatt family memorial at St. Tegais Church

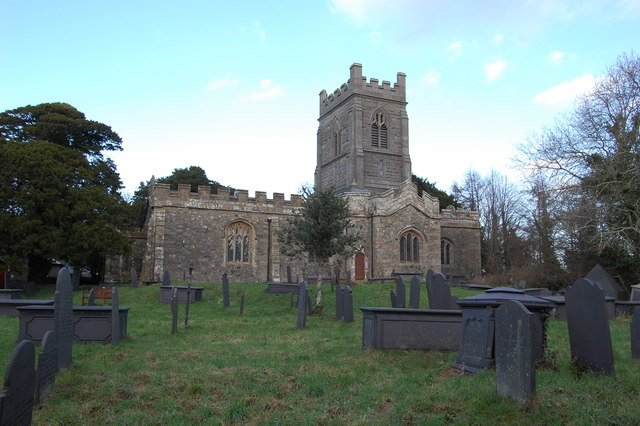
St. Tegais Church

A church was founded by Saint Tegai (or Tygái or simply Cai) in the fifth century. Relics of the Saint, including a stone coffin and a cross bearing his name, are kept at the church.

The present church dates to around 1330 and was much restored and extended by the diocesan architect, Henry Kennedy, in 1853. The church is of cruciform structure with a central tower. It is a Grade II* listed building.

The church has six bells. The bells naturally sound very loud inside the ringing chamber (from where the bells are rung); to combat this the bells are permanently fitted with leather muffles on both sides of the clapper. When ringing the bells they have a strange sound because of this; almost as if they are ringing inside a large tank of water.

In the church is a marble monument to Archbishop John Williams, the Lord Keeper of the Great Seal during the reign of James I. There is also monument by Richard Westmacott to the first Lord Penrhyn, in which the sarcophagus is flanked by a quarryman and peasant woman, described by Eric Hobsbawm as "the earliest sculpted proletarians".Christopher Bethell, Bishop of Bangor, is buried in the churchyard.

The ecclesiastical parish of Llandygai follows the Ogwen valley southwards, giving its name also to the village of Mynydd Llandygai.

== Education ==
There are accounts of schooling for twelve children under the Welsh Trust in the late seventeenth century, and later a circulating school established in the area in 1750. Shortly after her husband's death, the first Lady Penrhyn set up a school for girls in the village in what is now Neuadd Talgai. A school for boys was built in 1843.

The boys school, now with a twentieth century extension, forms the present-day primary school, Ysgol Llandygai. It is a Voluntary Controlled school with around 170 pupils.

== The village today ==
The model village, within the loop of the former line of the A55 road, retains much of its original character, despite some more recent additions, having been declared a conservation area in 1974. The village is next to the Grand Lodge affording the principal entrance to Penrhyn Castle, the former seat of the Penrhyn family, now a National Trust property open to the public.

Outside the model village are also to be found –

- Off the A5 towards Bangor:
  - Llandygai Gypsy Site
  - Llandygai Industrial Estate
  - Ty Newydd probation hostel
  - Bangor Cricket Club (Ty Newydd ground)
- Off the A5 towards Bethesda:
  - Parc Cegin business park (in development)
- Off the former line of the A5, now a narrow lane:
  - Bangor Rugby Football Club

The Holyhead to Chester railway passes by the village through the Llandygai Tunnel, which is 442 yards in length, before emerging onto the Ogwen Viaduct to the east of the village.

== Spelling ==
The correct Welsh language spelling is Llandygái, with the accent signifying that the last syllable is stressed as opposed to the last-but-one, the usual pattern. It is commonly spelled Llandygai (without the accent), or also Llandegai, in English

== See also ==
- Arllechwedd (electoral ward)
