= Battle of Y Dalar Hir =

Battle of the Second English Civil War

- Part of the Second English Civil War
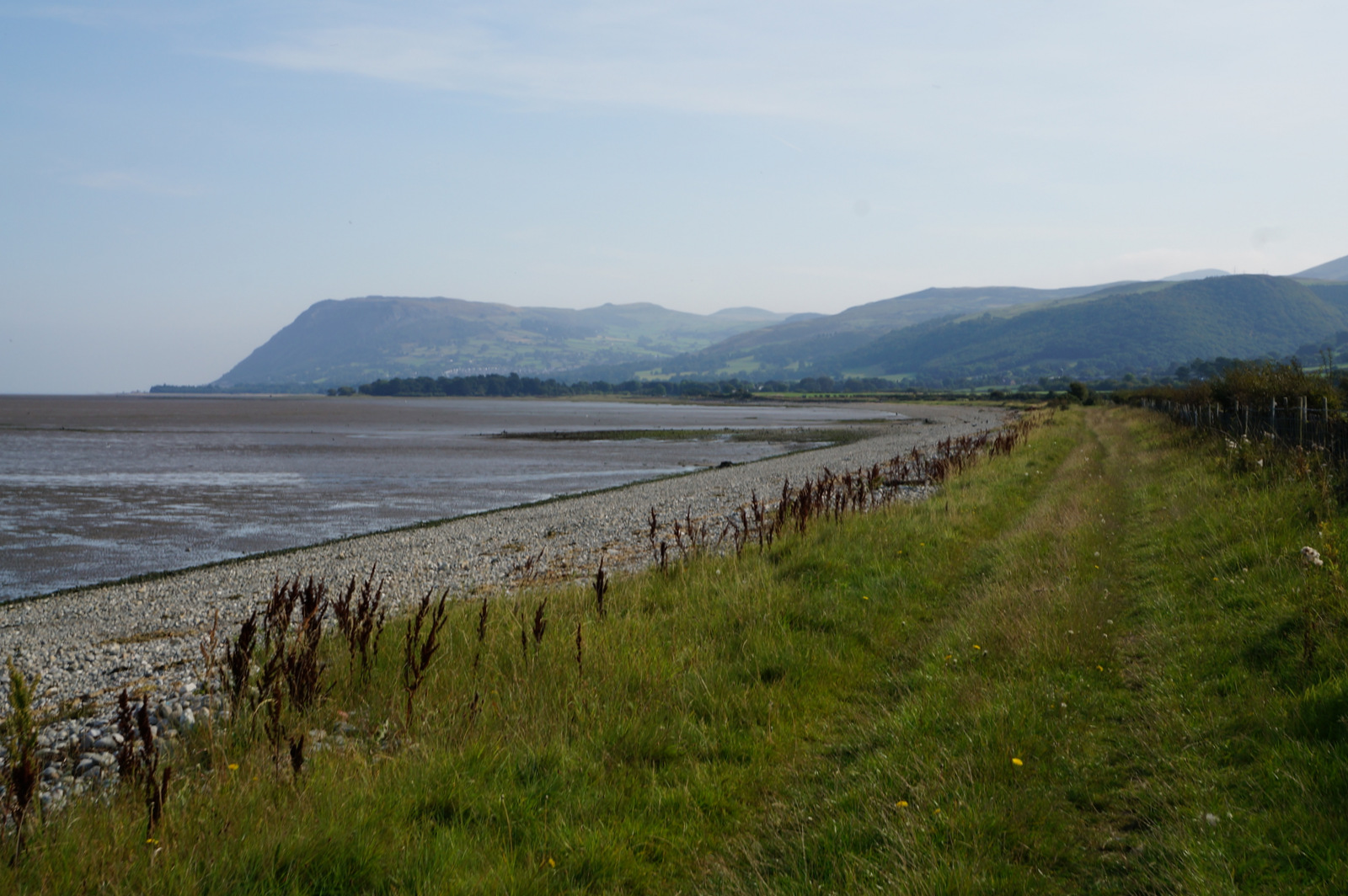
- The foreshore near Y Dalar Hir
Date	5 June 1648
Location	Y Dalar Hir, near Llandegai, Caernarfonshire, Wales 53°13′57″N 4°03′31″W
Result	Parliamentarian victory

Belligerents
Royalists	Parliamentarians

Commanders and leaders
Sir John Owen	Colonel George Twisleton; Colonel John Carter

Strength
120 foot; 140 horse	100 foot; 30 horse

Casualties and losses
30 killed c. 60 prisoners	30–40 killed

The Battle of Y Dalar Hir took place on 5 June 1648 in Caernarfonshire, North Wales, during the Second English Civil War. While little more than a skirmish, it had a significant effect on the local progress of the conflict.

Leading Welsh Royalist Sir John Owen of Clenennau mustered a group of 250-300 cavalry and foot in an attempt to raise North Wales in rebellion against Parliament; on 3 June he defeated local militia in a skirmish near Caernarfon and besieged Caernarfon Castle. Colonel George Twisleton, Parliamentarian governor of Denbigh, confronted Owen at Y Dalar Hir on the shore of the Menai Straits near Llandegai, where the Royalists were scattered and Owen captured, effectively ending the spread of the rebellion in North Wales.

== Background ==
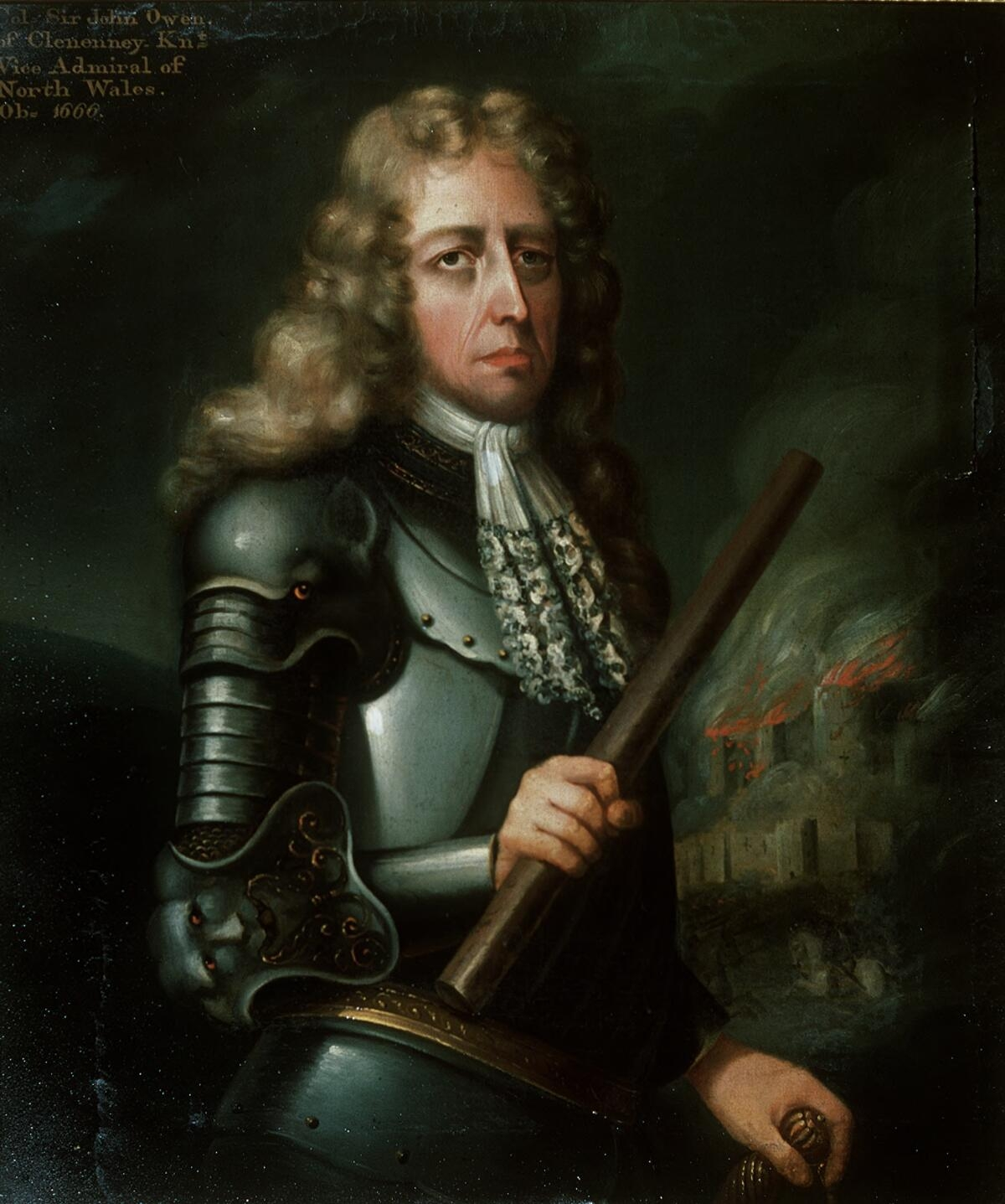
Sir John Owen of Clenannau; he began raising local forces in North Wales to support a larger Royalist revolt in Pembrokeshire.

The First English Civil War had ended in 1646 with the defeat of Charles I's forces, but by 1648 divisions within Parliament and the army were threatening peace. Believing himself essential to any peace settlement, Charles had refused to compromise in negotiations; in December 1647 he made an agreement with representatives of the Scottish Parliament to restore him fully to the English throne in return for imposing a Presbyterian polity for three years. He expected backing from Presbyterian moderates in the English Parliament, while mutinous elements of the army also became drawn into the plan.

The revolt began in Pembrokeshire, an area controlled by Parliament since early 1643. Like their colleagues in the New Model Army, the soldiers had not been paid for months, and feared being disbanded without their wages. In early March, John Poyer, Governor of Pembroke Castle, refused to relinquish command; he was joined by the senior commander in South Wales, Rowland Laugharne.

What began as a pay dispute became overtly political when the Welsh rebels made contact with Charles. Most Royalists had sworn at the end of the first war not to bear arms against Parliament and did not participate, one exception being Sir Nicholas Kemeys, who held Chepstow Castle for the king. By the end of April, Laugharne had assembled around 8,000 troops, and was marching on Cardiff.

Owen and Byron's attempted rising in North Wales, 1648; key locations

In the interim Royalist sympathisers attempted to expand the revolt into North Wales. The north had been affected by the same pay issues as South Wales, while heavy taxation and a poor harvest in 1647 stoked local economic resentments. At the beginning of May, Sir John Owen, a Caernarfonshire landowner who had served as Royalist governor of Conwy Castle during the first war, began recruiting in Merioneth. Senior Royalist exile John Byron, who in March had been given a commission to raise men in his former command of North Wales by the Prince of Wales in anticipation of a Scots intervention, left France for Anglesey on hearing of Owen's mobilisation. While small numbers were involved, Byron believed a guerrilla-type campaign in the north could assist the Pembrokeshire rebels by drawing away Parliament's resources.

On arrival at Anglesey Byron found most local landowners unenthusiastic, but he and Owen continued recruitment efforts throughout May, "giving out many threatening speeches against the Parliament". In the south, Laugharne was defeated on 8 May at St Fagans, but the Royalists' retention of several fortresses encouraged them to continue. The garrison of Beaumaris under Captain Thomas Symkys joined the revolt, as did elements of the Anglesey Trained Bands. In mid-May Owen was reported at Dolgellau with about "100 reformados [former Royalist officers] where they quartered two nights"; Colonel George Twisleton at Denbigh sent patrols to search for Owen among the mountain passes, but the Royalists managed to evade them. The counties of Flintshire, Denbighshire and Montgomeryshire issued declarations that they would resist the rebels and "oppose [...] the disturbance of the peace of the Kingdome".

== Skirmish at Caernarfon ==
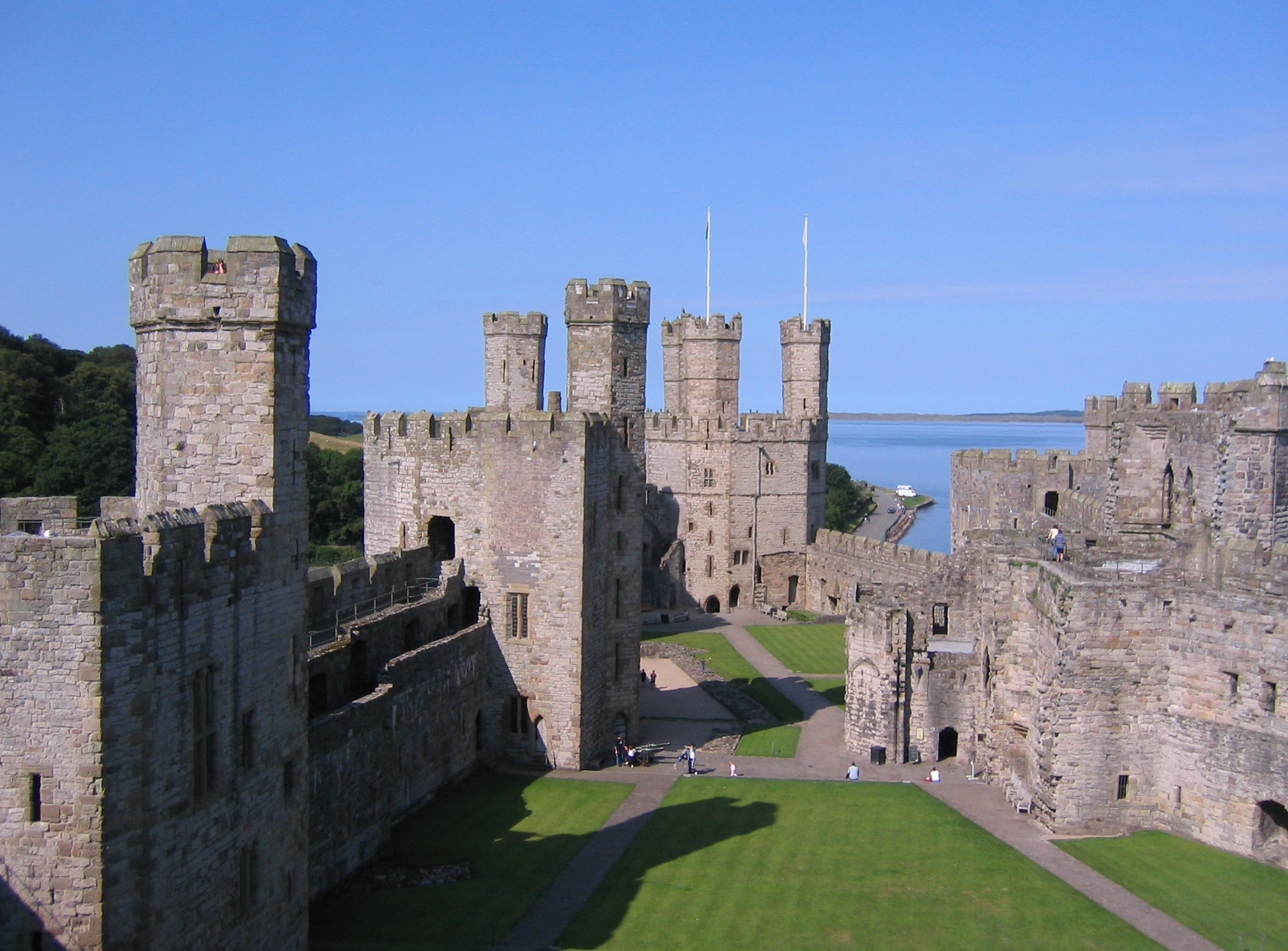
The ward of Caernarfon Castle; Owen briefly besieged it in early June

By the beginning of June Owen had raised a force of about 300. Thomas Mytton, governor of Caernarfon and senior Parliamentarian commander in the area, was anxious to crush the rising before it grew further and sent an urgent message to Twisleton at Denbigh requesting reinforcement. Twisleton and John Carter, governor of Conwy, gathered a scratch force of less than 200 men from Chester and their own garrisons and set out to relieve Mytton, dragging two small field guns with them. (Note: Ivor E. Davies, in a 1981 article in the Transactions of the Caernarvonshire Historical Society, suggested that a small brass cannon that until well into the 20th century lay half-buried in sand between the former quarry jetties at Penmaenmawr might "from the circumstances of its position" have been one of Carter's two cannons abandoned during the march. See Davies, I. E. (1981) "An Unrecorded Mystery of the Civil War?", Transactions of the Caernarvonshire Historical Society, v.41, p.143)

On 3 June Owen clashed at Llandwrog with local militia under Mytton and William Lloyd, Sheriff of Caernarvonshire. Lloyd was seriously wounded and taken prisoner, while Owen briefly besieged Mytton in Caernarfon Castle; Mytton grew concerned that more sympathisers might join the Royalists after hearing news of Owen's success.

Owen received news that the relief force under Twisleton and Carter was marching along the old Roman road through Bwlch-y-Ddeufaen towards the coast, and decided to intercept them. Leaving a small number of men to blockade Mytton, he raised the siege and marched north-eastwards through Bangor: the wounded Lloyd died during the journey, allegedly of "neglect and ill-usage". (Note: Lloyd had switched sides during the first war, which was rumoured to have contributed to his poor treatment at the hands of Owen's men.) Two days after the skirmish at Caernarfon, Owen encountered Twisleton on the shore of the Menai Straits at Y Dalar Hir, north-east of Llandegai.

== The battle ==
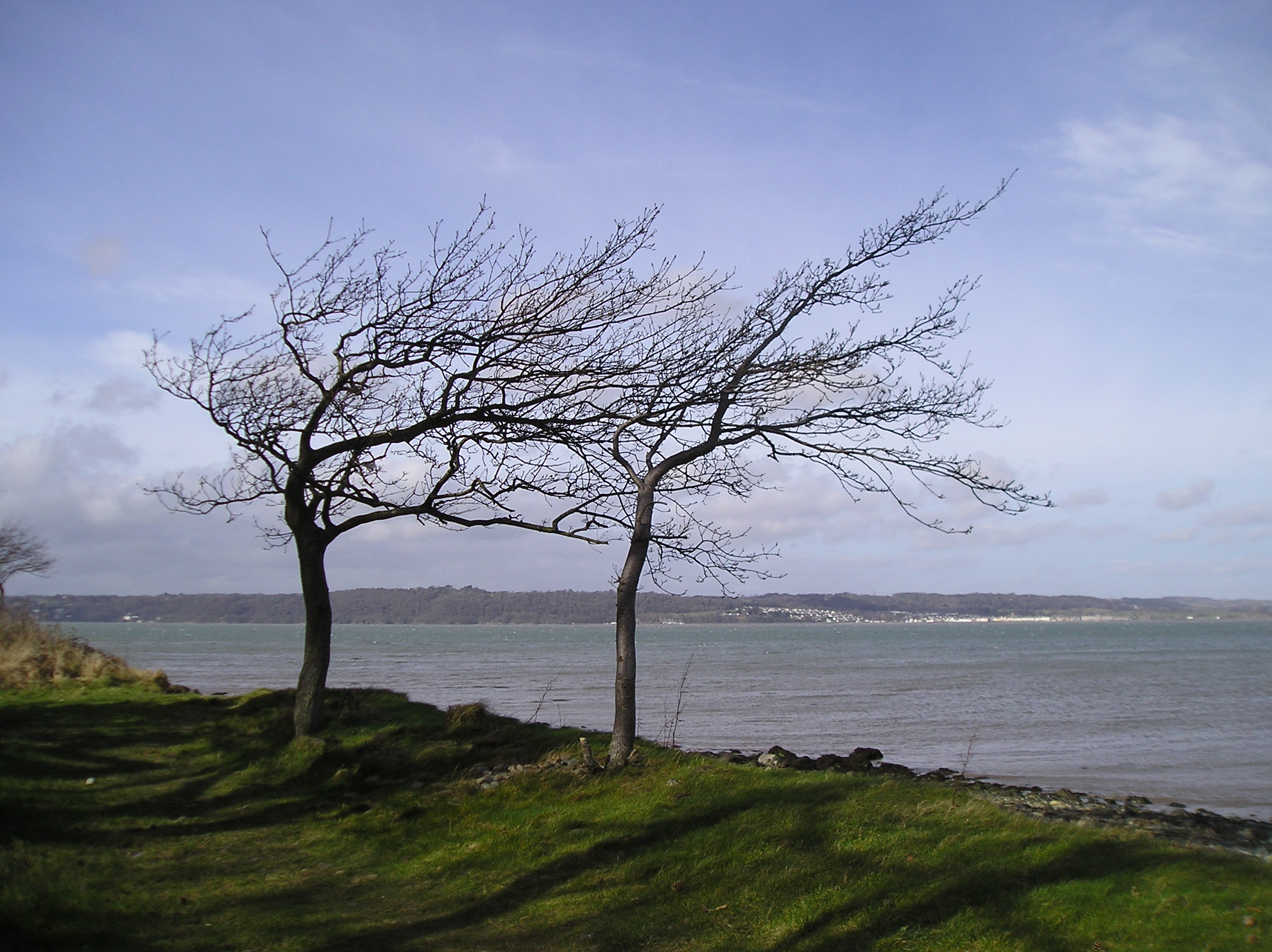
Looking from the shoreline near Y Dalar Hir towards Beaumaris, held by the rebels at the time of the battle

The fighting was marked with some confusion: the commanders had chosen similar "field-words" ("Resolution" for Owen, and "Religion" for Twisleton) and the same "field-sign", in that neither side wore scarfs or sashes. Both sides began the battle by charging with a cavalry forlorn hope, the Royalists having the better of the encounter. Owen then attacked the Parliamentarian horse, who were driven back in a disorderly retreat.

Following his initial success Owen ordered the entire Royalist force to charge the Parliamentarian reserve; however Twisleton's men received and held the charge and after a fiercely contested action of about 30 minutes routed the Royalist cavalry. A Parliamentarian trooper, Captain Edward Taylor, singled Owen out in the retreat and engaged him in hand-to-hand combat. Taylor broke his sword over Owen's head, wounding him, pulled him from his horse and took him prisoner.

The loss of Owen caused the remaining Royalists to scatter. Parliamentarian accounts later claimed that 30 Royalists had been killed and 60 "private Soldiers" taken prisoner, along with Owen and several other officers. While some reports claimed as few as four Parliamentarian casualties, others suggest a figure of 30-40 dead on both sides. The Royalists were also accused of shooting three prisoners during the battle, in addition to the alleged murder of Lloyd.

== Aftermath ==
Owen was initially held in Denbigh Castle, where there were several attempts to rescue him. On the night of 3 July up to 60 Royalists scaled the outer walls using two ladders: they were spotted before getting through the inner gate and most were taken prisoner. Later in the month two of Owen's officers, Major John Dolben and Captain Charles Chambres, mounted another attempt: the diarist William Maurice wrote "aboute the 16th Dolbein and Chambers with their companye came before Denbigh castle, and in a bravado, discharged their pistols and wente away".

He was later brought to London, where he was charged with treason, the violation of his articles of surrender, and the murder of Lloyd. At his trial in February 1649 he was condemned to death, but submitted a successful petition for reprieve: its success was variously attributed to the intervention of Cromwell, Ireton, and foreign ambassadors, as well as to the kidnapping of Griffith Jones of Castellmarch as a hostage by the Royalist captain Bartlet.

While a number of North Wales Royalists remained in arms, Owen's defeat at Y Dalar Hir meant that the rebellion became largely confined to Anglesey. The Scots invasion was defeated in August at Preston; in September it was reported that Byron had departed Anglesey for Dublin, and at the end of the month Mytton and a mixed force of 1,500 crossed the Menai Straits to restore order. He defeated Royalist commander Richard Bulkeley on 1 October in the parkland around Red Hill House; Bulkeley retreated to Beaumaris Castle, but surrendered soon afterwards.

== Sources ==
- Anon. (1829). "A Short Account of the Rebellion in North and South Wales". Cambrian Quarterly Magazine and Celtic Repertory. 1.
- Bennett, Martyn (2005). The Civil Wars Experienced: Britain and Ireland, 1638-1661. Routledge.
- Dodd, A.H. (1959). "OWEN, Sir JOHN (1600-1666), royalist commander". Dictionary of Welsh Biography. National Library of Wales.
- Gaunt, Peter (1991). A Nation Under Siege: The Civil War in Wales, 1642-1648. Cadw.
- Jenkins, Geraint (1987). The Foundations of Modern Wales: Wales 1642-1780. Oxford University Press.
- Mangianello, Stephen (2004). Concise Encyclopedia of the Revolutions and Wars of England, Scotland, and Ireland, 1639-1660. Scarecrow.
- Matthews, Robert (2011). A Storme Out of Wales: The Second Civil War in South Wales, 1648. Cambridge Scholars.
- Mitchison, Rosalind; Fry, Peter; Fry, Fiona (2002). A History of Scotland. Routledge. ISBN 978-1138174146.
- Rees, James Frederick (1947). Studies in Welsh History: Collected Papers, Lectures, and Reviews. University of Wales Press.
- Tucker, Norman (1964). Denbighshire Officers in the Civil War. Gee & Son.
- Tucker, Norman (1958). North Wales in the Civil War. Gee & Son.
