= Privies of Wales =

- First edition cover
- Author: Rev. J. Aelwyn Roberts
- Language: English
- Subject: Outhouses, Toilets, Welsh history
- Genre: Non-fiction
- Publisher: Tegai Publications
- Publication date: 2000
- Publication place: Wales
- Media type: Print (paperback)
- Pages: 100 (paperback edition)
- ISBN: 0-9539494-0-0
- OCLC: 49001961
- Dewey Decimal: 696.182
- LC Class: TH6498 .R63 2000

Privies of Wales is a nonfiction book by J. Aelwyn Roberts, a former vicar of Llandegai. The book traces a history of human sanitation and examines individual examples of Welsh garden privies. The research for the book was paid for by a grant from Cadw.

== Summary ==
The first half of the book presents a brief history of human sanitation disposal starting from the digging of small holes to the “earth closet”; the “privy pioneers” of the Minoans, Romans, and Normans; and information about cesspits. The second half examines multiple examples of Welsh privies, how they were constructed, and how they were used. Roberts also writes about industrial privies, public privies, and the restoration of old privies.

== Development history ==
In 1998 Nicholas Battle, publisher of Countryside Books, asked Roberts to write a book on “The Privies of North Wales.” Although Roberts initially did not want to write such a book, Battle was able to persuade him. The author recalls:

[Nicholas Battle] went on to tell me he was virtually giving me the opportunity to write a book that would be read by generations to come. He was inviting me to write a classic. He suggested that I could be to Welsh Privies what George Borrow is to Wales. He elaborated that if I wrote a book on the privies of North Wales for his publishing firm no other publishing firm in the country would touch the subject for another twenty years. And in twenty years, he said, “there will be no privies in North Wales for anyone to write about”. I am a vain person. I have always wanted to be the author of a classic. The book was written and very well received.

Roberts was contacted by friends in south and mid-Wales about how they also had endangered privies but no way of "keeping them in remembrance." Roberts wrote to Cadw, the Welsh heritage service of the Welsh Assembly Government, to warn them of the "great catastrophe that was befalling [Wales]" with the loss of garden privies. Cadw offered a research grant to create the book on Welsh privies.

=== Publication history ===
- 2000, Wales, Tegai Publications ISBN 978-0-9539494-0-3, Paperback
