= John Owen (Royalist) =

Welsh landowner and Royalist officer in the English Civil War

Sir John Owen JP
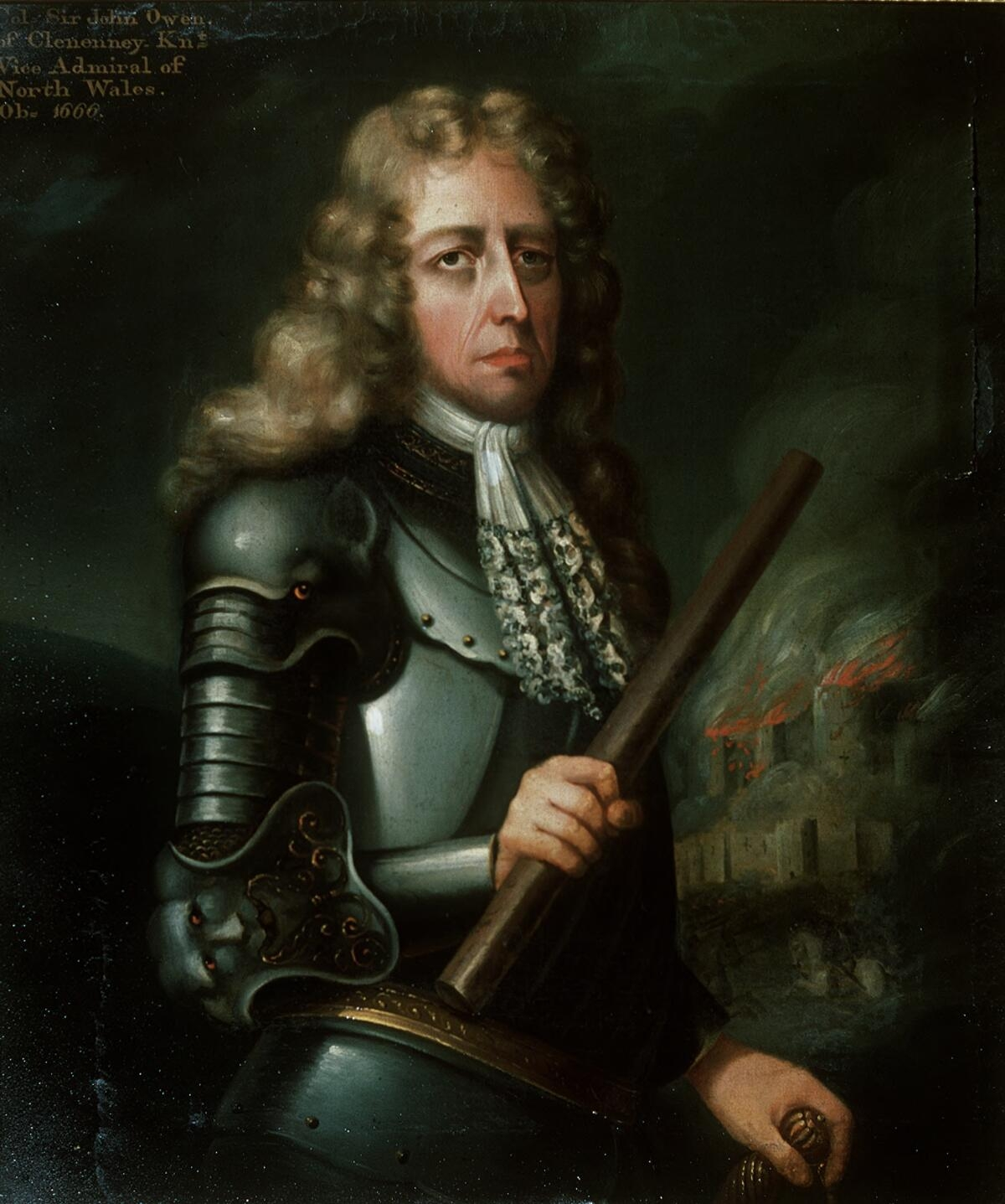
- Portrait of Sir John Owen, c.1660

Vice-admiral of North Wales
- In office 1660–1666

Sheriff of Merionethshire
- In office April 1632 – March 1633

Sheriff of Caernarvonshire
- In office April 1631 – March 1632

Royalist Governor of Conwy
- In office December 1644 – November 1645

Personal details
- Born: c. 1600 Clenennau, Dolbenmaen, Caernarfonshire
- Died: 1666 Clenennau
- Resting place: St Beuno's Church, Penmorfa
- Spouse: Janet Vaughan
- Children: One son, two daughters

Military service
- Allegiance: Royalist
- Rank: Colonel
- Battles/wars: Dutch Revolt; Wars of the Three Kingdoms; Bristol, 1643; First Newbury; Siege of Conwy Castle; Battle of Y Dalar Hir; Booth's Uprising

Sir John Owen of Clenennau (c. 1600–1666), was a Welsh landowner from Anglesey, who served with the Royalist army in the Wars of the Three Kingdoms, during which he held various commands in North Wales.

The Earl of Clarendon, in his history of the war, noted that Owen described himself as "a plain gentleman of Wales, who had been always taught to obey the King"; by contrast Cromwell referred to Owen in passing as "a violent man, now got into trouble enough". Following the Second English Civil War he was sentenced to death in 1649 for treason and the murder of a Parliamentarian official, William Lloyd, but was later reprieved. After the Stuart Restoration in 1660, he was made Vice-Admiral of North Wales, dying in 1666.

== Early life ==
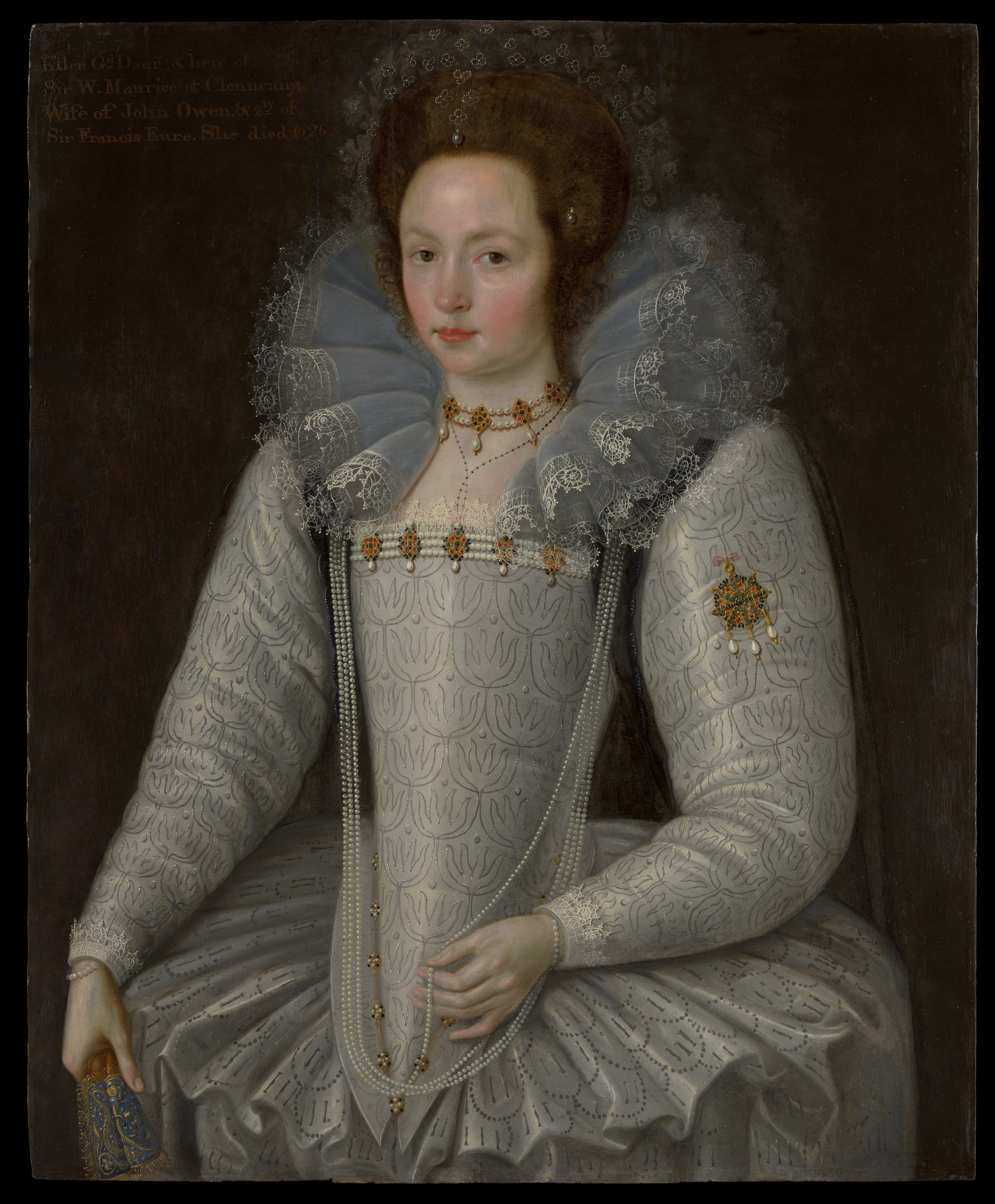
Portrait of Ellen Maurice by Marcus Gheeraerts the Younger, 1597.

Owen was born around 1600 in the commote of Eifionydd in north-west Wales. He was the eldest son of John Owen of Bodsilin, Anglesey (d.1613), secretary to Francis Walsingham. His mother, Elin Maurice, was the daughter of William Wynn Maurice of Clenennau and the granddaughter and heiress of the politician Sir William Maurice of Clenennau. After the elder John Owen's death, she remarried to Sir Francis Eure, a justice of the circuit court of North Wales.

Owen's background connected him with a tradition of High Anglicanism maintained by gentry families in Wales through much of the 17th century and centred on figures like Francis Mansell, principal of Jesus College, Oxford. This "church loyalism", which emphasised the Divine right of kings, was to play a "crucial role in the fate of the Royalist cause". After a period of military service, Owen inherited Clenennau on his mother's death in 1626, along with the large Maurice estates in south Caernarfonshire, Merioneth, and Anglesey. He was High Sheriff of Caernarfonshire in 1630 and of Merioneth the following year.

== First Civil War ==
At the outbreak of the First English Civil War Owen was put on the Commission of Array for Caernarfonshire. Charles I authorised him to use county funds to raise and equip a regiment of foot in the three shires of Gwynedd, though local opposition meant that the unit was not ready until May 1643.

Owen and his regiment were initially in service at Oxford, before being sent to join Prince Rupert's force besieging Bristol, where he was wounded in the face. He was later appointed Governor of Reading, and fought at the First Battle of Newbury in September.

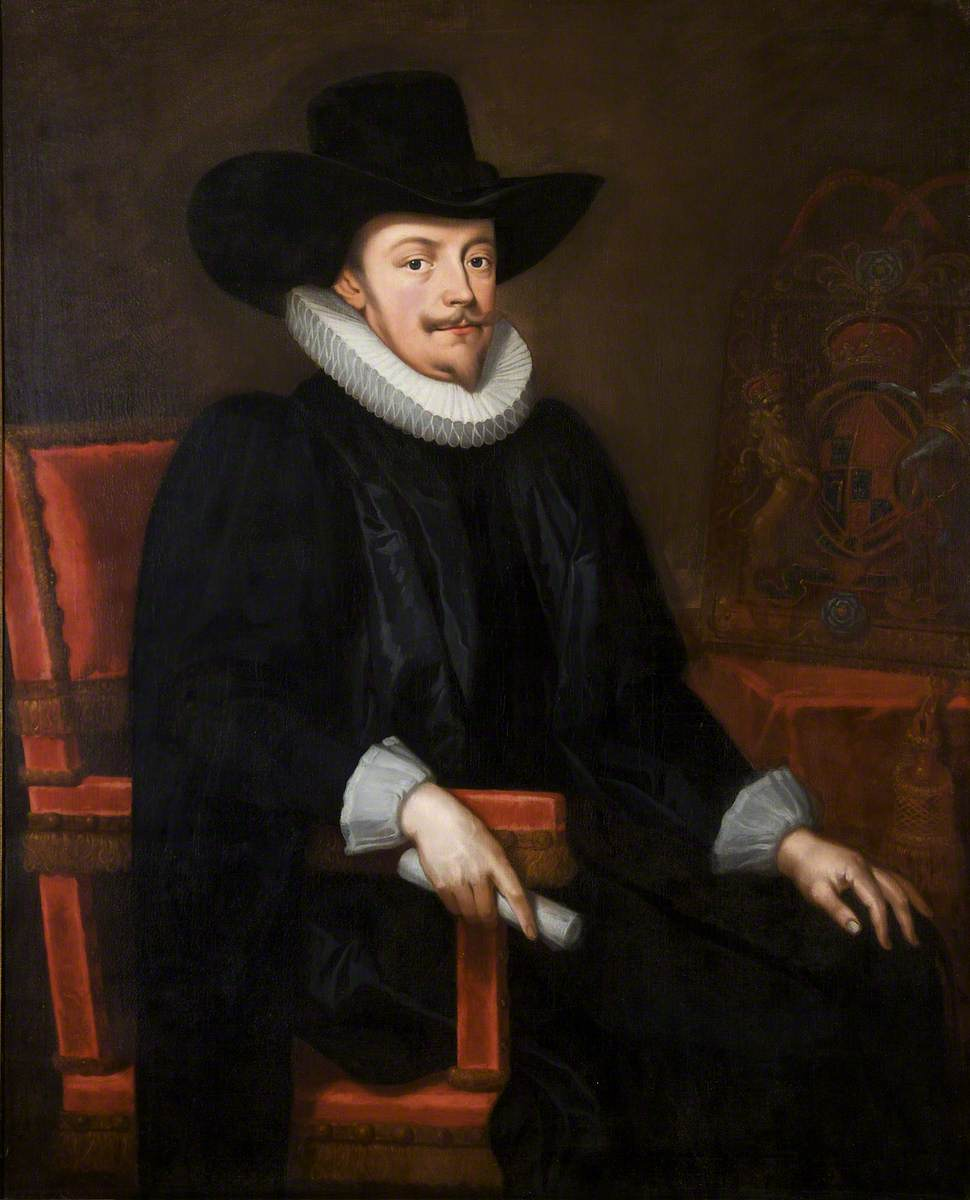
Archbishop of York John Williams, who clashed repeatedly with Owen during 1645–6 over the latter's military governorship of Conwy.

By the spring of 1644 he had returned to Wales; he was reappointed Sheriff of Caernarfonshire that autumn. Following Thomas Myddleton's invasion of Wales in the winter of 1644 Owen was knighted by Charles at Oxford and was made Governor of the strategic walled town of Conwy. In February he was commissioned Sergeant Major General of foot under the Governor of Chester, John Byron, 1st Baron Byron.

Owen encountered a good deal of resistance to military rule at Conwy, where the town's defences had previously been organised by Archbishop Williams of York, a Conwy native. In May 1645 Owen forcibly took possession of Conwy Castle from Williams, for which he was personally rebuked by Charles. The relationship between Williams and Owen broke down completely in 1646 after the latter requisitioned cattle and stores from Williams' relations at Gwydir Castle, and with Royalist control of Wales crumbling, in August Williams finally assisted Parliamentarian troops under Thomas Mytton to take Conwy. Owen continued to occupy the castle until surrendering on "honourable terms" on 9 November.

In the immediate aftermath of the war he retired to Clenennau; he was fined heavily by Parliament but rejected an offer from Rupert to lead a Welsh brigade in French service.

== Second Civil War ==
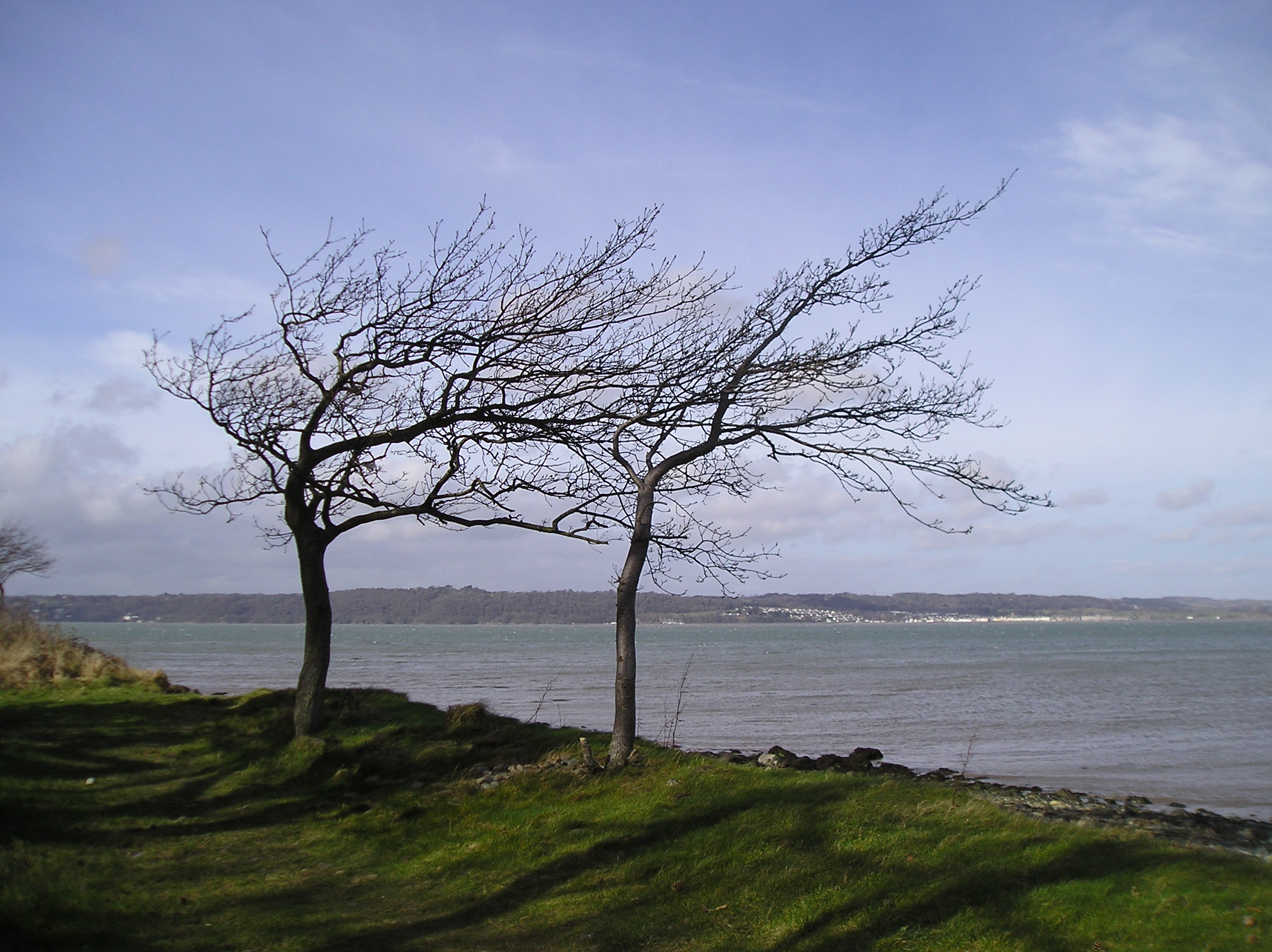
The Menai Straits at Y Dalar Hir; Owen's involvement in the 1648 revolt ended in a running battle near this spot

By 1648 prospects of a peace settlement appeared in danger; Charles made an agreement with the Engager faction of the Parliament of Scotland to invade England and restore him, while elements of the Parliamentarian army were mutinous over arrears of pay. A revolt over pay led by Major-General Rowland Laugharne began in South Wales in March 1648, which became overtly political when the rebels made contact with Charles. Most Royalists chose to abide by the terms of their surrender and avoided involvement: Owen was said to have initially considered joining Laugharne, but was persuaded to attempt to spread the rebellion to Caernarfonshire.

In early May Owen began recruiting disaffected former Royalist officers; his former superior Byron also arrived in Anglesey from France. Throughout the spring he managed to avoid local Parliamentarian forces under Mytton and George Twisleton, Governor of Denbigh, and by early June had gathered a force of around 300 men. On 3 June he attacked Caernarfon, taking prisoner the current High Sheriff, William Lloyd of Plas Hen, and trapping Mytton in Caernarfon Castle. Lloyd was seriously wounded and later died of "neglect and ill-usage" at the hands of Owen's men.

After a brief siege Owen received news that Twisleton was marching towards Caernarfon with a relief force. Raising the siege, Owen decided to intercept Twisleton, confronting him at Y Dalar Hir on the shore of the Menai Straits on 5 June. A confused running battle developed, in which Owen initially had the upper hand but failed to break Twisleton's reserves; a Parliamentarian trooper, Captain Edward Taylor, took on Owen in single combat, pulled him from his horse, and took him prisoner, after which the remaining Royalists scattered.

Owen was taken by Mytton under guard to Denbigh Castle; Owen's officers made several unsuccessful rescue attempts. He was later moved to London and held at Windsor Castle.

== Trial and later life ==
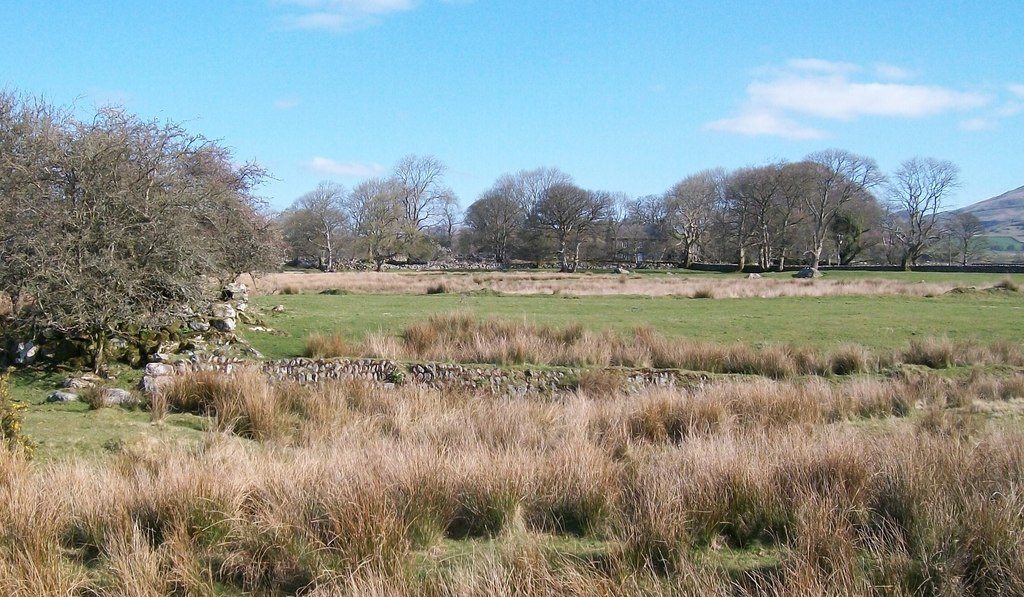
Clenenney Farm, near Dolbenmaen, which incorporates a wing of Owen's former manor house.

Owen was charged with treason, the violation of his 1646 articles of surrender, and the murder of Lloyd. He was tried alongside Lords Goring, Holland, Cambridge, and Capel, who had also led local rebellions in 1648. At trial in February 1649 he was condemned to death; he is supposed to have commented that "it was a very great honour to a poor gentleman of Wales to lose his head with such noble lords" and swore "that he was afraid they would have hanged him".

Owen later submitted a successful petition for reprieve; the reason for its success is "a mystery", but at the time was variously attributed to the personal intervention of Cromwell, Ireton, and foreign ambassadors, as well as to the kidnapping of Griffith Jones of Castellmarch as a hostage by the Royalist captain Bartlet. A later comment by Owen suggests that the regicide James Chaloner may have been responsible for the reprieve, although there is no obvious reason for his interest in Owen's case. By July he was at liberty in London, where he entertained John Evelyn with a Welsh harpist, and was back at Clenennau by September.

During the 1650s Owen remained quietly at home, although his movements were subject to restrictions; in 1652 the poet John Taylor recorded that Owen entertained him at Clenennau with a "liberall welcome". In 1659 he joined the abortive Royalist rebellion known as Booth's Uprising, leading to another sequestration order being placed on his estate. After the 1660 Stuart Restoration, Owen was rewarded for his previous service by being appointed to the Vice-Admiralty for North Wales, but took relatively little further part in public life: Owen had little interest in or aptitude for politics, being "fundamentally a soldier". He died in 1666 and was buried at Penmorfa Church.

== Family ==
Owen married Janet, the daughter of Griffith Vaughan of Cors-y-gedol, Merioneth: they had one son, William (1624–1677), through whom Owen was the ancestor of the Owen and (later) Ormsby-Gore families of Brogyntyn, and two daughters, Anne and Katherine. Katherine, who married Robert Anwyl, later became well known as a patron of Welsh literature.

Other members of the Owen family, over several generations, were also patrons of Welsh language poets; among the National Library of Wales' manuscript holdings from the Brogyntyn collection are several poems written in praise of Sir John Owen, including poems written at the time of his appointment as Sheriff and a lengthy eulogy.

== Sources ==
- Carlyle, Thomas, ed. (1845). Oliver Cromwell's letters and speeches, volume I. Chapman & Hall.
- Dodd, Arthur (1959). "OWEN, Sir JOHN (1600-1666), royalist commander". Dictionary of Welsh Biography. National Library of Wales.
- Ellis, Stephen (2014). Conquest and Union: Fashioning a British State 1485–1725. Routledge.
- Hutton, Ronald (2009). The Royalist War Effort 1642–1646. Routledge.
- Hyde, Edward, Earl of Clarendon (1826). The History of the Rebellion and Civil Wars in England, Book XI.
- Jones, E.D. (1953). "The Brogytntyn Welsh Manuscripts". Llyfrgell Genedlaethol Cymru: The National Library of Wales Journal. 8 (1).
- Lawson, P. H. (1959). "ANWYL family, of Park, Llanfrothen, Meironnydd". Dictionary of Welsh Biography. National Library of Wales.
- Matthews, Robert (2011). A Storme Out of Wales: The Second Civil War in South Wales, 1648. Cambridge Scholars.
- Rees, J.W. (1931). "The Second Civil War in Wales". Transactions of the Honourable Society of Cymmrodorion. Session 1930–31.
- Tucker, Norman (1964). Denbighshire Officers in the Civil War. Gee & Son.
- Young, Peter (1985). Naseby 1645: The Campaign and the Battle. Century.
