= William Thomas (MP for Carnarvon) =

William Thomas (died 1653) was a Welsh politician who sat in the House of Commons from 1640 to 1644.

Thomas was the son of Sir William Thomas but became a Queen's ward in 1593. He owned lands in Carnarvonshire, Anglesea and Carmarthen with his main house in Carnarvonshire. In 1638 he was High Sheriff of Caernarvonshire.

In December 1640, Thomas was elected Member of Parliament for Carnarvon in the Long Parliament. He was disabled from sitting in Parliament on 5 February 1644 and became Groom of the Privy Chamber to the Queen Consort on 14 February 1644. He compounded £780 for his estates.

Parliament of England
| Preceded by John Glynne | Member of Parliament for Carnarvon; 1640 | Succeeded by William Foxwist |
