= George Twisleton =

English soldier and politician

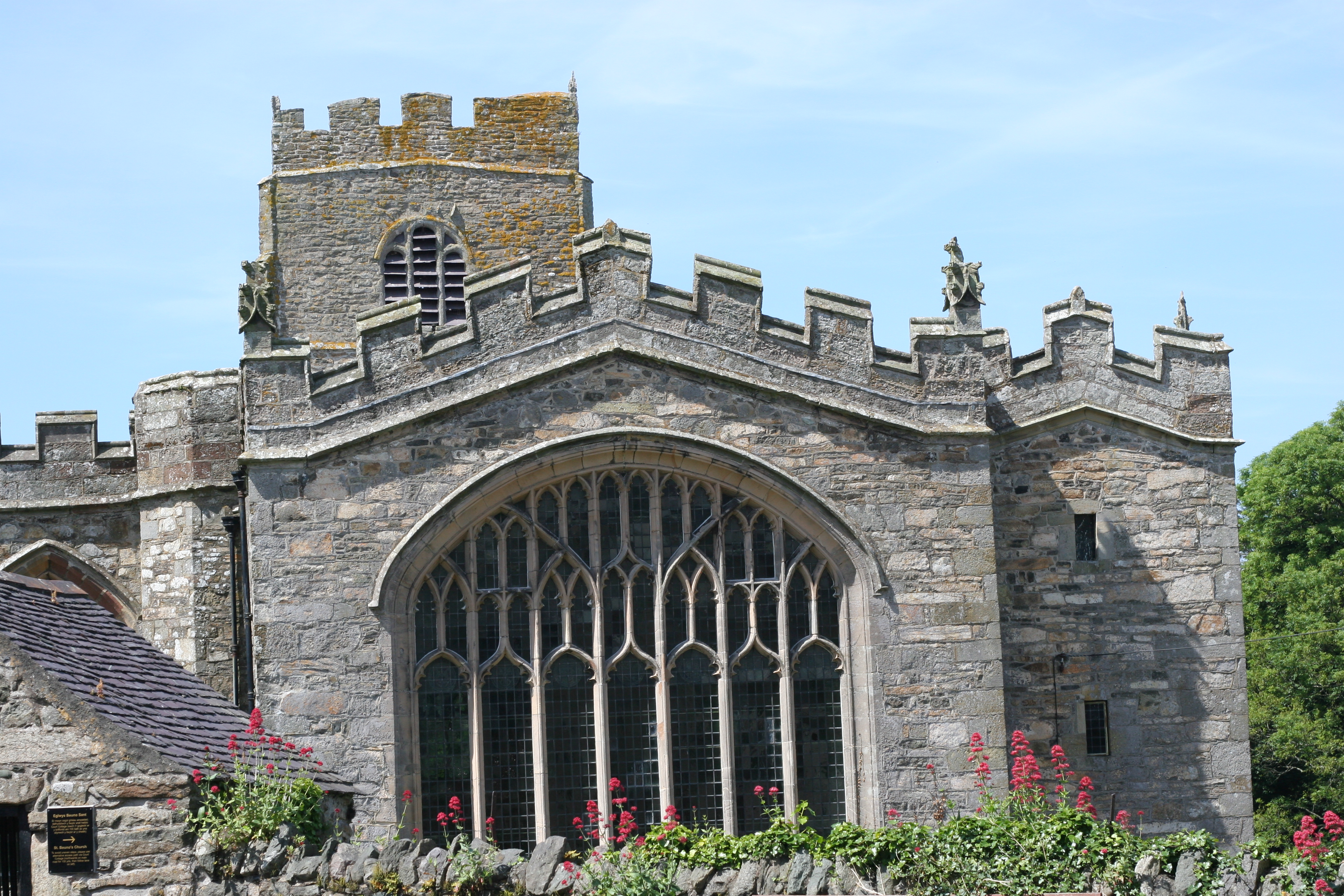
- St Beuno's Church, Clynnog Fawr, where Twisleton was buried in 1667

Member of Parliament for Anglesey
- In office September 1654 – April 1659

Governor of Denbigh Castle
- In office October 1646 – May 1660

Personal details
- Born: 1618 Drax, West Riding of Yorkshire
- Died: 12 May 1667 (aged 48–49) Lleuar Fawr, Carnarvonshire
- Resting place: St Beuno's Church, Clynnog Fawr
- Spouse: Mary Glynne c. 1650 to his death
- Children: George (1652–1714); Margaret; Jane; Philip (died 1701); William (died 1719); Mary (died 1720?); Alice (died 1720?); Elin (died 1727)

Military service
- Rank: Colonel
- Battles/wars: Wars of the Three Kingdoms; Siege of Chester; Denbigh Green; Siege of Denbigh Castle; Battle of Y Dalar Hir

George Twisleton, 1618 to 12 May 1667, was a member of the landed gentry from Yorkshire and colonel in the Parliamentarian army during the Wars of the Three Kingdoms. Under the Commonwealth of England, he sat as MP for Anglesey from 1654 to 1659.

Although nominated to the High Court of Justice for the Trial of Charles I in January 1649, he did not participate and thus escaped prosecution after the 1660 Stuart Restoration. Thereafter he lived quietly at home in Lleuar Fawr, Carnarvonshire, where he died in 1667.

== Personal details ==
George Twisleton was born in 1618, third son of John Twisleton, who owned lands near Drax and Barlow, North Yorkshire, and Margaret Constable (died 1626). His two elder brothers, John (1614–1682), and Philip (c. 1616–1673), also supported Parliament during the Wars of the Three Kingdoms.

Sometime before 1652, he married Mary Glynne (died 1676), a Welsh heiress; they had numerous children, including George (1652–1714), Margaret, Jane, Philip (died 1701), William (died 1719), Mary (died 1720?), Alice (died 1720?), and Elin (died 1727).

== First English Civil War ==
When the First English Civil War began in 1642, his brother Philip joined the army of the Eastern Association in Lincolnshire. Twisleton's own movements are uncertain, although it seems likely he served with the Northern Association horse under Sir Thomas Fairfax. In April 1645, he is listed as Lieutenant Colonel of a cavalry regiment in the forces led by Sir William Brereton, Parliamentarian commander in the North Midlands.

How Twisleton ended up here is unclear. Fairfax combined with Brereton on a number of occasions, including the Battle of Nantwich in January 1644, and Twisleton's unit may have remained in the area to support the Siege of Chester. The latter was a key supply point, linking Royalist recruiting areas in Wales and Ireland with their armies elsewhere in England. By summer 1645, Brereton's blockade meant only the crossing over the River Dee still connected Chester and North Wales.

Key locations mentioned in article

Based in Oswestry, Twisleton was deputy to Colonel John Carter, charged with driving the Royalists out of Montgomeryshire. The Battle of Naseby in June 1645 turned the war decisively in favour of Parliament, while the surrender of Montgomery Castle shortly afterwards cemented their control of the county.

This allowed Parliamentarian forces from Oswestry under Thomas Mytton to push north into Denbighshire and Carnarvonshire. At Denbigh Green in November 1645, they repulsed a last ditch Royalist attempt to relieve Chester. Twisleton led an attack on Whitchurch, Shropshire in December, and was then sent to blockade Hawarden Castle, just before Chester capitulated in February 1646. Denbigh Castle itself held out until October 1646, when the garrison was ordered to surrender by Charles I. Twisleton became the new Governor, a position he retained until the Stuart Restoration in 1660.

== Second English Civil War ==
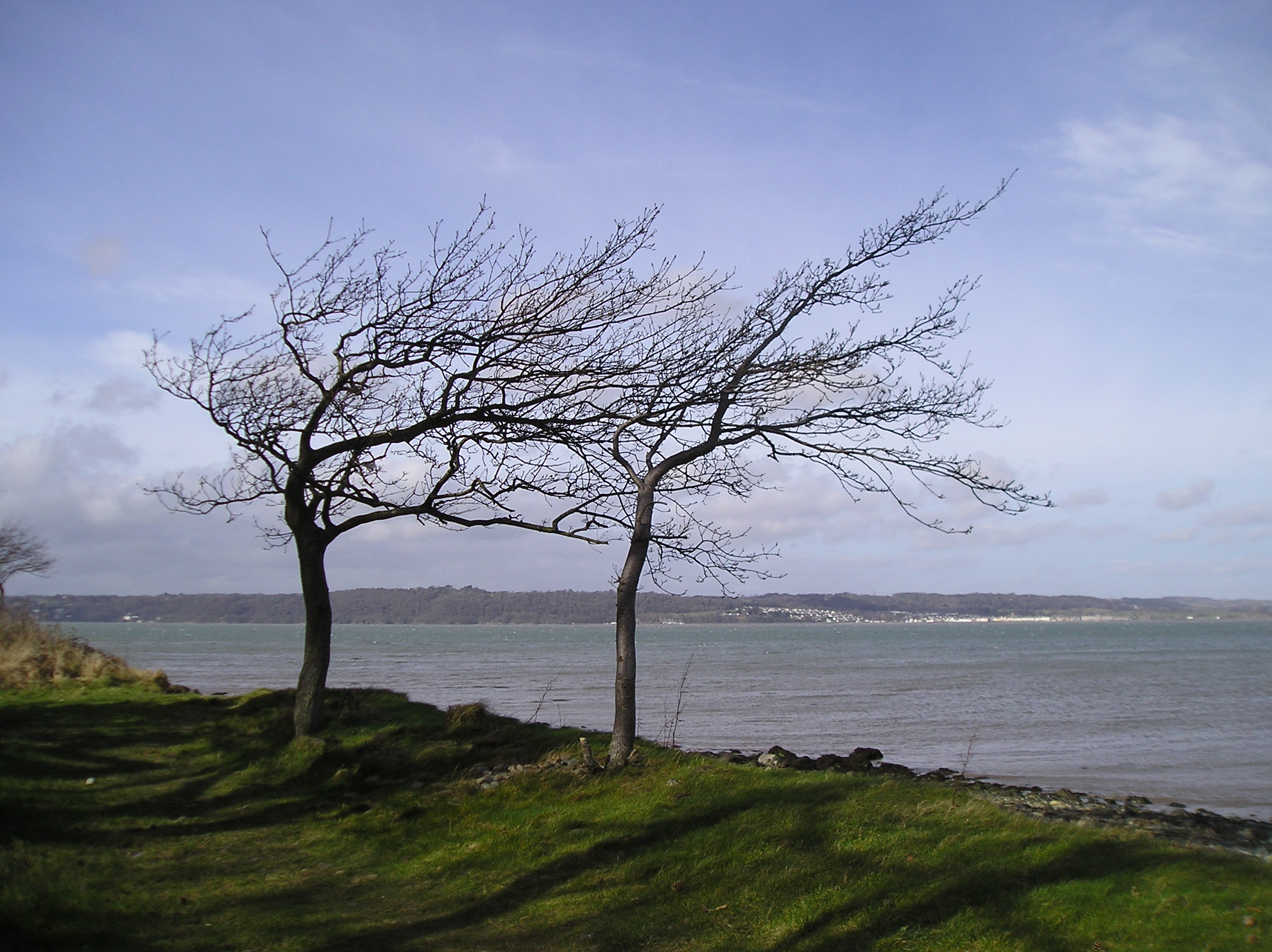
Menai Straits, close to the site of the Battle of Y Dalar Hir, fought on 5 June 1648

However, victory resulted in bitter disputes over the post-war political settlement between the New Model Army and the majority of MPs in Parliament. In this internal struggle, Twisleton's own position is unclear, although Philip Twisleton sided with the army, and in August 1647 replaced Edward Rossiter as colonel of the regiment guarding Charles I at Holdenby House. Rossiter was viewed by the Army Council as unreliable due to his links with Parliamentary moderates, and dismissed.

When the Second English Civil War began in April 1648, John Owen, former Royalist Governor of Conwy, raised a small force in Carnarvonshire. On 3 June, he laid siege to Caernarfon Castle; Twisleton marched to its relief, and two days later Owen intercepted him near Y Dalar Hir on the shore of the Menai Straits. In the ensuing battle, the Royalists initially had the upper hand but fled after Owen was captured. Combined with an earlier victory at St Fagans in May, this ended serious Royalist resistance in Wales, although Anglesey was not finally subdued until October.

In January 1649, Twisleton was among the 135 commissioners appointed to the High Court of Justice for the Trial of Charles I, but he did not attend the proceedings. He focused instead on establishing his position in Denbigh, marrying Mary Glynne, an heiress whose father was Lord Chief Justice from 1655 to 1660, while her brother William was Member of Parliament for Caernarfon in 1659. Returned as MP for Anglesey in 1654, Twisleton was re-elected in both 1656 and 1659, serving on several Parliamentary committees.

In the political infighting that took place in the last few months of the Commonwealth, Philip Twisleton supported George Monck, who considered his brother George reliable enough to confirm him as colonel of an infantry regiment in February 1660. Following the Stuart Restoration in May, the regiment was disbanded, while the Royalist Bulkeley family resumed their control of local politics. Twisleton resigned all his offices, and retired to live on his wife's estate at Lleuar Fawr. He died there on 12 May 1667, and was buried in St Beuno's Church, Clynnog Fawr.

== Sources ==
- Barton, Tony (2008). "Colonel Edward Rossiter's Regiment of Horse". Archived from the original on 14 June 2021.
- Clark, David (2010). The English Civil War. Pocket Essentials. ISBN 978-1842433454.
- Gentles, Ian (2002). Kenyon, John; Ohlmeyer, Jane (eds.). The Civil Wars in England in The Civil Wars; a Military History of England, Scotland and Ireland 1638-1660. OUP. ISBN 978-0192802781.
- Helms, M.W; Mimardière, A.W (1983). GLYNNE, William (1638-90), of Bicester, Oxon. and Hawarden, Flints in The History of Parliament: the House of Commons 1660–1690. Boydell & Brewer.
- Hutton, Ronald (2003). The Royalist War Effort 1642–1646. Routledge. ISBN 9780415305402.
- Mangianello, Norman (2004). Concise Encyclopedia of the Revolutions and Wars of England, Scotland, and Ireland, 1639-1660. Scarecrow. ISBN 978-0810851009.
- Rees, J.W. (1931). "The Second Civil War in Wales". Transactions of the Honourable Society of Cymmrodorion. Session 1930–31.
- Roberts, Stephen K (2017). 'Philip Twisleton in Surnames beginning "T": The Cromwell Association Online Directory of Parliamentarian Army Officers. British History Online.
- Royle, Trevor (2004). Civil War: The Wars of the Three Kingdoms 1638–1660 (2006 ed.). Abacus. ISBN 978-0-349-11564-1.
- Wales, Tim (2017). 'George Twisleton in Surnames beginning "T": The Cromwell Association Online Directory of Parliamentarian Army Officers. British History Online.
- Williams, W. G (1959). TWISLETON, GEORGE (1618-1667), officer in the parliamentary army in Dictionary of Welsh Biography.
- Williams, W. R (1895). The Parliamentary History of the Principality of Wales 1541-1895. Edwin Davies.

Parliament of England
Preceded by Not represented in Barebones Parliament	Member of Parliament for Anglesey; 1654–1659; With: William Foxwist 1654; Griffith Bodwrda 1656	Succeeded by Not represented in Restored Rump
