= William Foxwist =

Welsh judge and politician

William Foxwist (1610 – 1673?) was a Welsh judge and politician who sat in the House of Commons at various times between 1647 and 1660.

== Life ==
Foxwist was born in 1610 in Caernarvon, Wales, the son of Richard Foxwist of Carnarvon and his wife Ellen Thomas daughter of William Thomas of Aber. He matriculated at Jesus College, Oxford on 25 January 1628 aged 17. He became a barrister, joining Lincoln's Inn in 1636 and being called to the bar in 1645. He was Recorder of St Albans in 1645.

In 1646, Foxwist became judge of the admiralty for North Wales. In 1647 he was elected member of parliament for Carnarvon until he was excluded under Pride's Purge in 1648. He became Bencher of his Inn in 1649. He was elected MP for Anglesey in 1654 for the First Protectorate Parliament. He became puisne justice of the Brecknock circuit in 1655 and held the post until 1659. He was elected MP for Swansea in 1659. He became judge advocate of the Chester circuit in 1660 and in the same year was elected MP for St Albans in the Convention Parliament. He was regarded as a moderate Parliamentarian.

Although the date of his death is unknown, his will was dated 1673 and was proved in the same year.

Foxwist married Mary Pemberton, daughter of John Pemberton of St Albans.

Parliament of England
Preceded by William Thomas	Member of Parliament for Carnarvon; 1646–1648	Not represented in Rump Parliament
Vacant Not represented in Barebones Parliament	Member of Parliament for Anglesey; 1654; With: George Twisleton	Succeeded by George Twisleton; Griffith Bodwrda
New constituency	Member of Parliament for Swansea; 1659	Constituency disenfranchised
