= Burgess Gate =

Part of the defences of Denbigh Castle, Denbigh, Wales

Coordinates: 53°10′57″N 3°25′15″W

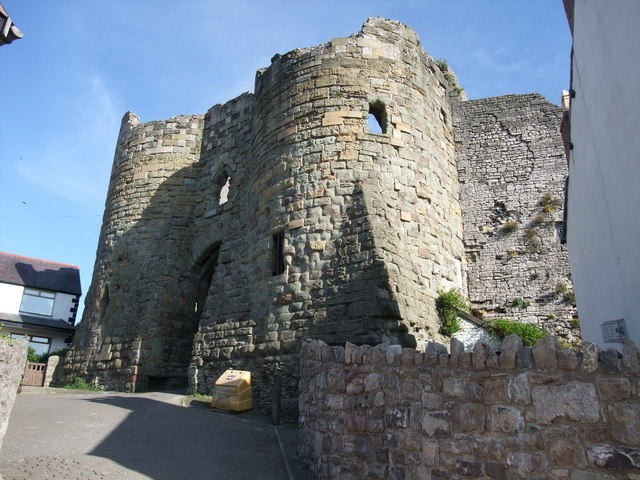
The Burgess gate; the Northern entrance to the Denbigh Old-town and Castle

The Burgess Gate was built as part of the outer defences of Denbigh Castle between 1282 and 1294. The gate is a Grade I listed building.

Located at the northern section of the medieval town walls of Denbigh, in Denbighshire, Wales, The gate was one of the two principal entrances into the walled town, the other being the exchequer gate to the south, which no longer survives. In 1646 the gate was the scene of a major conflict during the siege of Denbigh by Parliamentarian forces during the English civil war. The gate shows signs of considerable damage that was likely incurred the civil war.

== History ==
Construction of the gate was begun following the conquest of Northern Wales by Edward I in 1282, as part of a series of English fortifications designed to control the native Welsh population. The first English lord of Denbigh was Henry de Lacy, the Earl of Lincoln, who was appointed by King Edward I, and who was responsible for the construction of the Burgess gate. It is likely that Henry employed the architect James of St George to build the gate. He was a leading military architect of the time, responsible for designing other notable castles in Wales such as Harlech and Conwy. The gate was completed by 1294 though the larger fortifications were still under construction by the time of Edward's death in 1311. The gate was breached in 1400 during the Glyndŵr Rising although he was unable to take the castle itself and later withdrew. The town was again taken, and this time sacked, by Lancastrian forces during the wars of the roses, following which the old town within the walls was largely abandoned; the Burgess gate here became part of the castles outer defences as a result. There is evidence of Civil War era cannon danmage, particularly on the western tower.

The government took responsibility for the site, including the gate, in 1914, first under the Office of works, and currently under the Welsh heritage organisation Cadw.

== Architecture ==
The gatehouse is a two-storey structure comprising an East and West tower built from limestone, with sandstone ashlar facing. At the time of its construction, the gate was a matter of civic pride and its upper level is consequently decorated in a similar chequered fashion to the castle gatehouse. The original defensive features are still in evidence, such as murder-holes, the portcullis and side facing arrow slits.
