= Gwespyr =

Village in Flintshire, Wales

Coordinates: 53.335571°N 3.336687°W

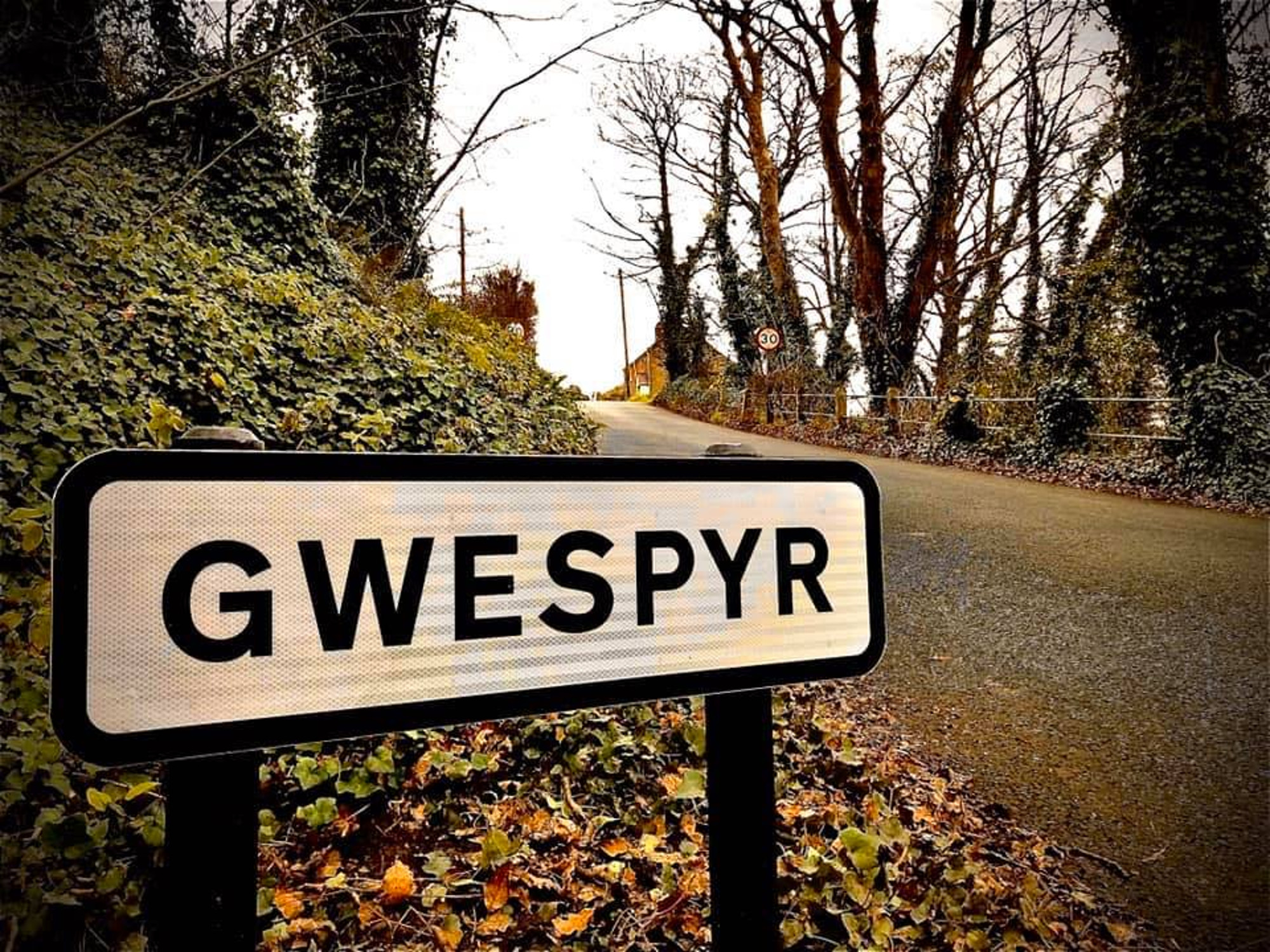
- Gwespyr Village sign

- Location within Flintshire
- OS grid reference: SJ1083
- Principal area: Flintshire
- Country: Wales
- Sovereign state: United Kingdom
- Post town: HOLYWELL
- Postcode district: CH8
- Dialling code: 01745
- Police: North Wales
- Fire: North Wales
- Ambulance: Welsh
- UK Parliament: Clwyd East
- Senedd Cymru – Welsh Parliament: Delyn

Gwespyr is a village in Flintshire on the north coast of Wales in the community of Llanasa. Gwespyr had a population of 289 people in the 2001 census. It overlooks Point of Ayr on the west side of the River Dee estuary and its sandy beaches with dunes. The hills of the Clwydian Range behind the village form the eastern boundary of the Vale of Clwyd. Although 'Gwespyr' looks Welsh, it is Old English for 'West-bury', which came to be interpreted as the 'west fort' meaning the westernmost fort in Mercia. Originally, it is thought to have been a strategic Mercian lookout which was reduced in importance with the development of a fortified Rhuddlan.

Gwespyr stone has been quarried in quantity from Roman times and shipped to the rest of the UK and abroad. "Gwespyr Stone" was commercially successful for its grain, colour, and quality of cutting and shaping. It was used for many buildings around Gwespyr, and was also used to build the ancient Maen Achwyfan Cross at Whitford, the chapel at St Winefride's Well in Holywell, stone carvings in Rhuddlan Castle and Denbigh Castle, St Asaph Cathedral, The Talacre Arms Public house in Gwespyr and Basingwerk Abbey in Greenfield, Flintshire. Gwespyr stone was also found on sites such as Prestatyn Castle and the Roman bath house in Prestatyn. There is evidence of the stone industry in Gwespyr prevalent even today, though all but one quarry is disused.

== Religion ==
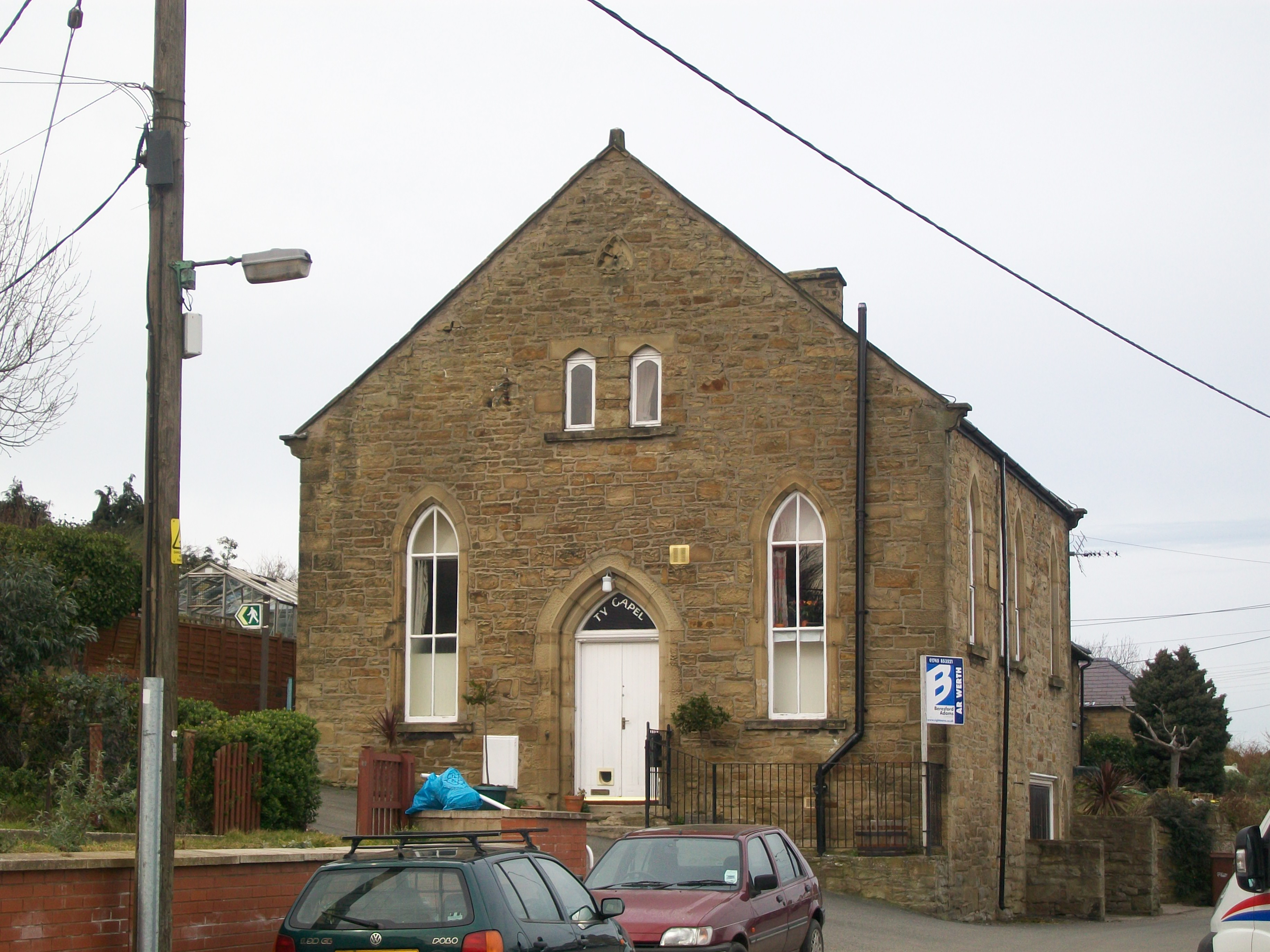
Capel Gwespyr

Gwespyr has been home to at least three Chapels during its history. Only two remain standing today, but they are now private houses. Gwespyr's chapels are listed as Calvinistic Methodist and Wesleyan Methodist. "Gwespyr Chapel", located in on Tanrallt Road, was Calvinistic Methodist and built in 1860. It had a congregation averaging 136 people between 1911 – 1960. "Wesley's Memorial Chapel" is also located on Tanrallt Road and was Wesleyan by denomination. The chapel was built in 1841 and was attended by an average of 140 worshipers between 1911 – 1960; services at the chapel where conducted in the Welsh language. Another chapel belonging to the Church in Wales was built during the 1960s on the top of Gwespyr Hill opposite the Reservoir. The structure was built out of tin and was nicknamed "The Tin Chapel" by the locals. The church was opened after the closure of its counterparts on Tanrallt Road but closed in the late 1970s and the congregation was moved to nearby Llanasa Parish Church. Church services were also held every other Sunday at Gwespyr Village Hall by the Minister from Llanasa to aid the elderly community who could not make the journey to nearby Llanasa. These services ceased due to falling numbers and changes at the Village Hall in 2001.

== Gwespyr Village Hall ==
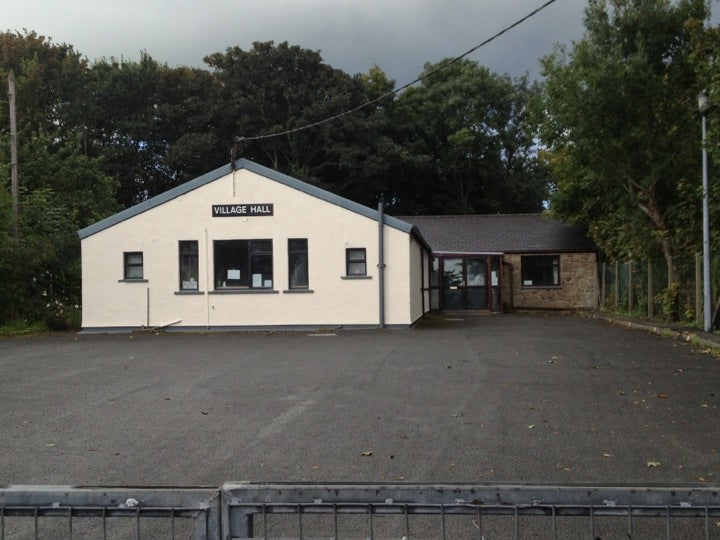
Gwespyr Village Hall in 2019

Gwespyr Village Hall was built in 1952. It was used initially by the local people as a meeting place and a variety of clubs where subsequently formed and based at the Hall, including a Bowls Club, Indoor shooting range club, Bingo, a Youth club and a Snooker club. The Village Hall could be rented by local residents for parties and events. In the 1980s, two extensions were built, funded by local government grants. A sub Post office was introduced at that time. The Village Hall was also home to Gwespyr Sounds Productions between 1998 – 2004 for its bands and music acts to rehearse. The Village Hall became redundant in 2004. A new committee was formed in June 2010 and registered as a Charitable organization and work began to regenerate the building. New events and openings began in May 2011. The Village Hall once again became redundant during the COVID-19 pandemic. A new committee was formed and the hall is undergoing a period of surveys and renovations in the hopes of once again opening its doors.

== War memorial ==
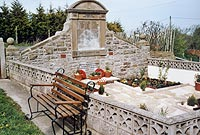
Gwespyr War Memorial

Gwespyr War Memorial sits in a small memorial garden near the top of Gwespyr Hill and was designed by R.Bruce Esq of Talacre. It commemorates the men who fought in World War I, together with the one soldier who died in action. The one soldier killed in World War II is also commemorated. The memorial was originally erected by Sir Pyres William Mostyn Baronet to commemorate Queen Victoria's diamond jubilee 14 August 1897.

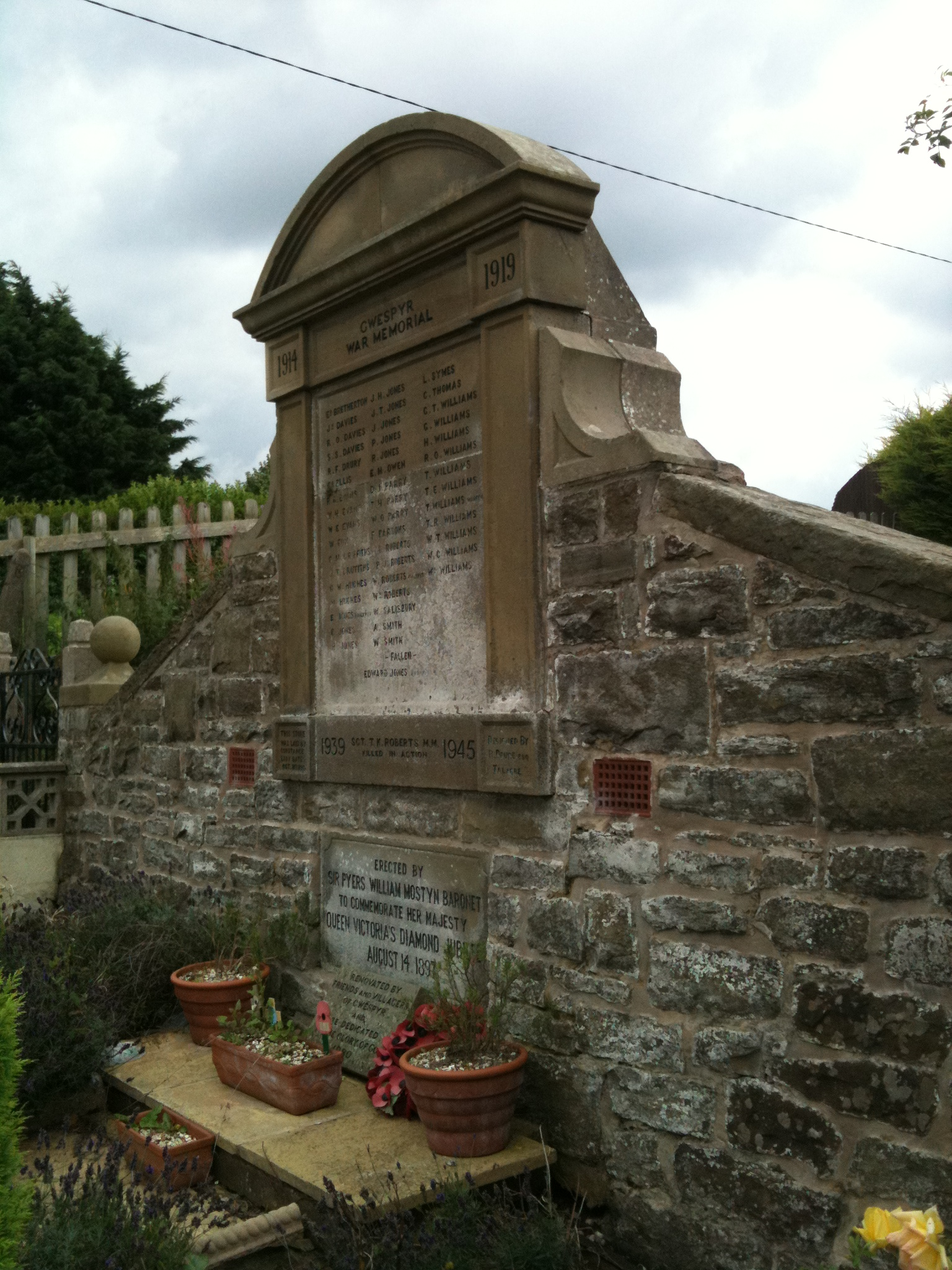
Gwespyr War Memorial

== Legend ==
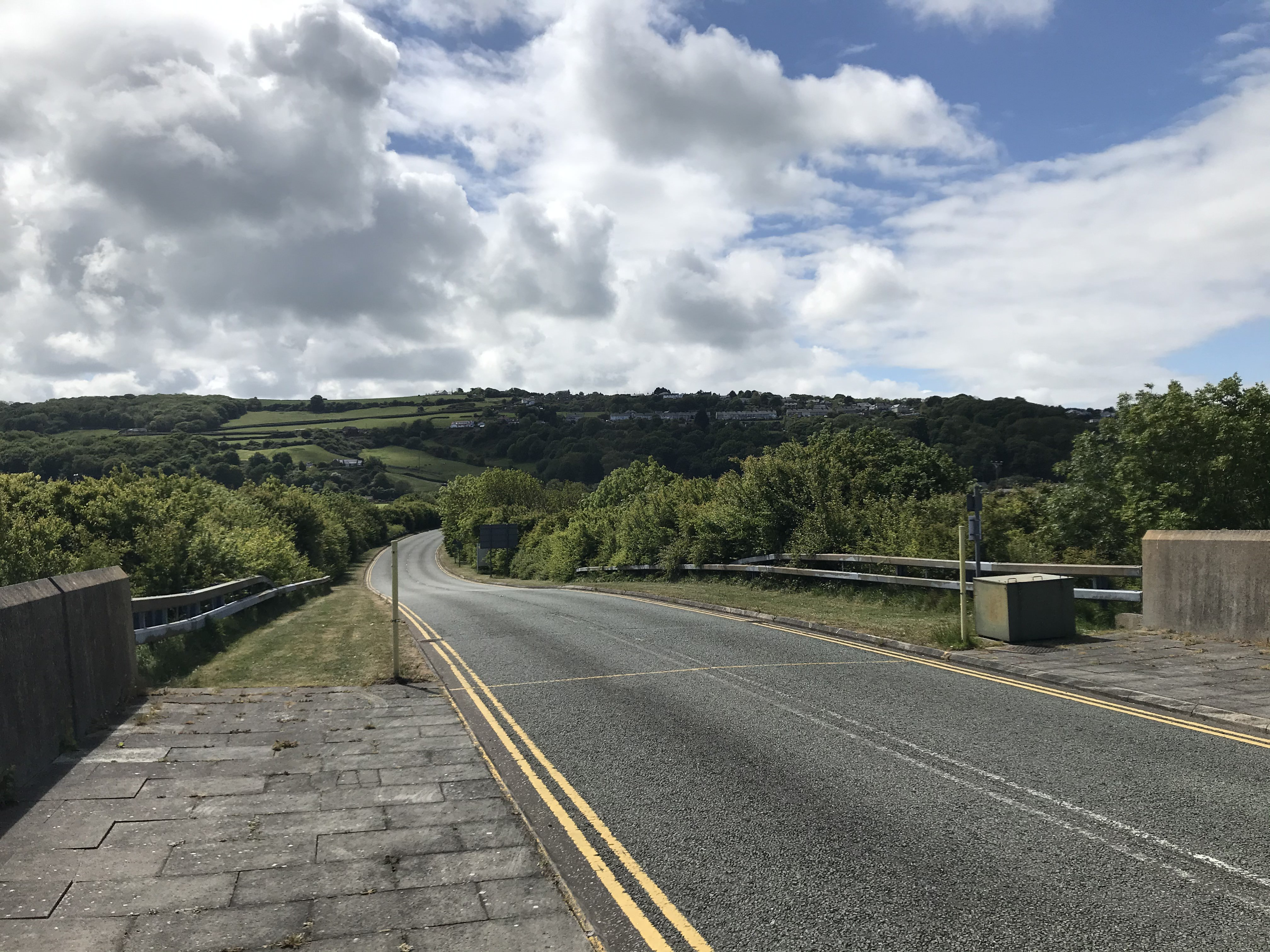
Gwespyr Hillside from Talacre

Frank Nicholson of Gwespyr was a Welsh baritone, a National Eisteddfod winner, and a radio singer, who was attacked and killed by a horse while walking home on a footpath leading from Talacre Abbey to Gwespyr on 8 October 1928. Three weeks later a woman was seriously injured by the horse at the same place.

== Amenities ==
=== Public houses ===
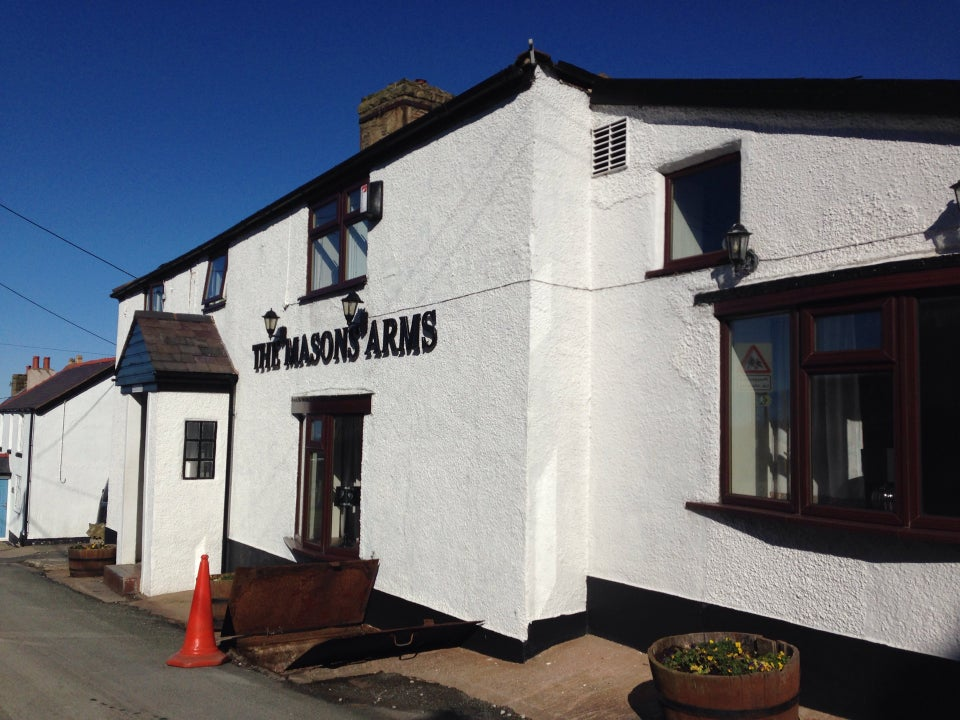
The Masons Arms

The village is home to two public houses. "The Masons Arms" is located near the top of Gwespyr Hill. The pub was owned by Allied Breweries and served Ansells beer until the mid-1990s when it was bought by private owners. The pub is still open.

"The Talacre Arms" was situated midway up Gwespyr Hill. The pub was popular during the 1960s when it was owned by Marston's Brewery until the mid-1990s when it was bought by private owners; it closed in May 2011 and is now a residence.

=== Playground ===
There is a play area across from the Masons Arms public house that is maintained by Flintshire County Council. It includes a basketball court.

== Transport ==
Bus services are provided by Arriva Buses Wales. There are two bus stops serving the village, one on Tanrallt Road across from the former shop and the other on the A548 coast road next to the old Cam Gas Store.
