= John Carter (Roundhead) =

English politician

Sir John Carter
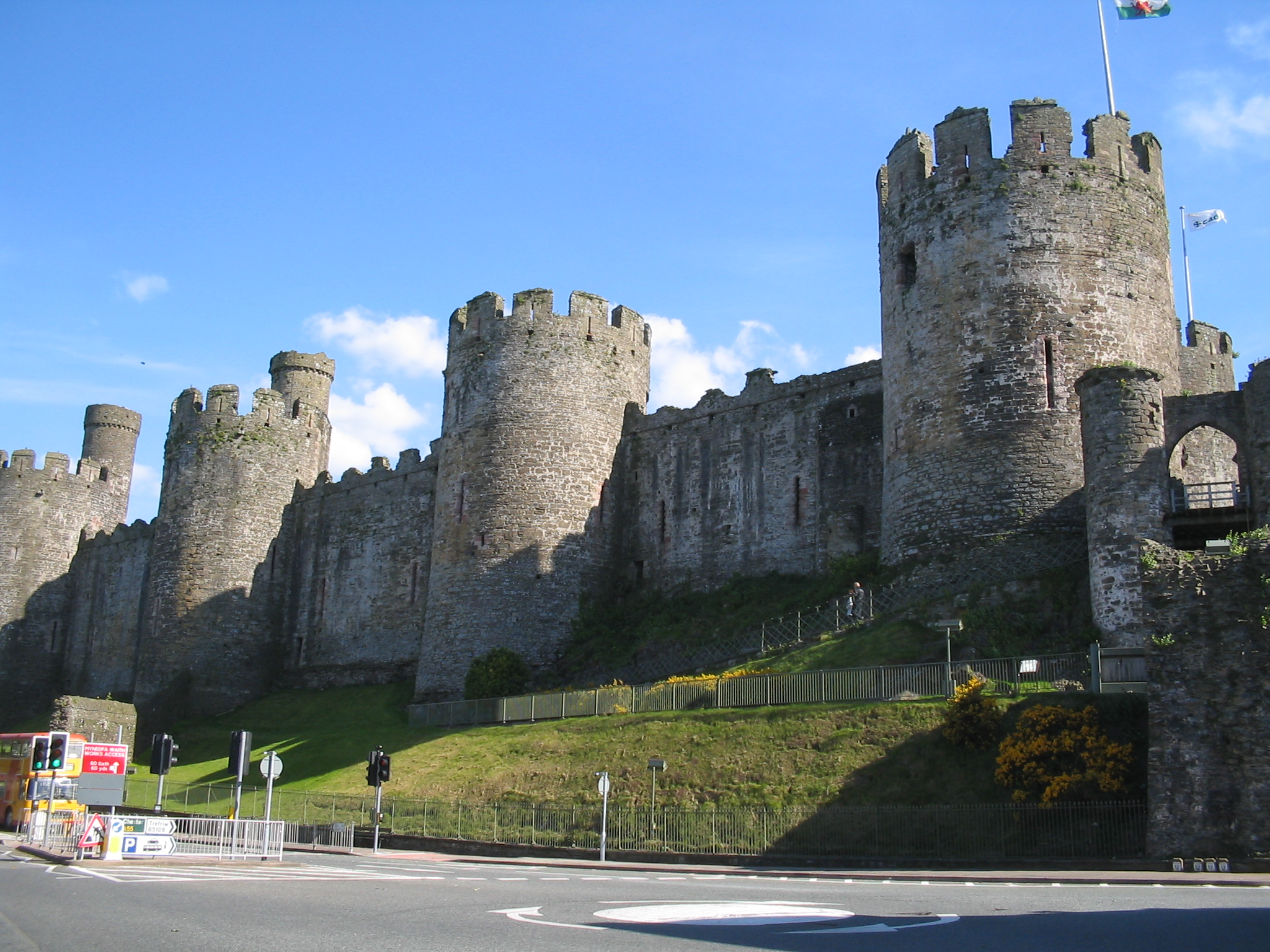
- Conwy Castle, where Carter was Governor, 1646 to 1661

High Sheriff of Denbighshire
- In office November 1664 – November 1665

Governor of Holyhead
- In office May 1660 – April 1661

Member of Parliament for Denbigh Boroughs
- In office April 1660 – December 1660

Member of Parliament for Denbighshire
- In office 1654–1659

Sheriff of Caernarvonshire
- In office February 1650 – November 1650

Governor, Conwy Castle
- In office 1646–1661

Personal details
- Born: c. 1619 Dinton, Buckinghamshire
- Died: 28 November 1676, aged 54-55 St George, Conwy
- Spouse: Elizabeth Holland
- Children: 2 sons, 4 daughters

Military service
- Rank: Colonel
- Battles/wars: Wars of the Three Kingdoms; Siege of Chester; Denbigh Green; Siege of Denbigh Castle; Battle of Y Dalar Hir

Sir John Carter (c. 1619 – 28 November 1676) was an English soldier, politician and administrator from Buckinghamshire, who served in the Parliamentarian army during the Wars of the Three Kingdoms. He settled in Denbighshire and was a Member of Parliament at various times between 1654 and 1660.

== Biography ==
Carter was the second son of Thomas Carter of Denton, Buckinghamshire. He is said to have been apprenticed to a linen-draper, probably in London. During the Civil War he joined the Parliamentary army where he distinguished himself as a Parliamentary officer. As Lieutenant Colonel Carter, he was sent with forces from London to reinforce General Middleton and landed in Pembrokeshire in August 1644. After marching to join Middleton's army in Cardiganshire he then accompanied him to North Wales. He was one of General Mytton's Commissioners to receive the surrender of Carnarvon Castle on 4 June 1646. He settled at Kinmel and became one of the most powerful men in Denbighshire. The Committee of both Houses ordered him to continue as Governor of Conway Castle on 17 July 1647. He was appointed a Commissioner for pious uses for the use of the Corporation of Denbigh on 17 November 1648 and was Constable of Conway Castle from 23 June 1649 to 15 February 1661. In 1649 he was appointed Sheriff of Caernarvonshire, (Note: The dates in the Williams are inconsistent "9 Oct. 1649-50, and 13 Feb. 1650" usually dates before 25 March are styled 1649-50 in this period (see Old Style and New Style dates), so it may be that he was Sheriff from 13 February 1649 to October 1649 or 1650. All that can be said with certainty from this source is that he was a Sheriff in 1649 and maybe also in 1650.) and was appointed a Commissioner of Sequestration in North Wales on 18 February 1650. He was Custos Rotulorum of Caernarvonshire from 1 May 1651 to 25 June 1656. As Governor of Conway, he received a commission from the Council of State on 18 August 1651 to raise a Troop of Horse.

In 1654 Carter was admitted a capital burgess of Denbigh and was elected Member of Parliament for Denbighshire in the First Protectorate Parliament. He was Custos Rotulorum of Carnarvonshire from 4 July 1656 to September 1660. In 1656 he was re-elected MP for Denighshire in the Second Protectorate Parliament. He was knighted by Cromwell between 1656 and 1658. In 1659 he was re-elected MP for Denbighshire in the Third Protectorate Parliament.

In 1660, Carter was elected Member of Parliament for Denbigh in the Convention Parliament. He was knighted on 7 June 1660 at Whitehall and was appointed Steward of the Manor of Denbigh in July 1660. He was ordered on 24 October 1660, with William Griffiths of Llyn and Griffith Bodwrda to see to the dismantling of Carnarvon Castle He was appointed Governor of the Fort and Garrison of Holyhead in November 1660. In 1665 he was High Sheriff of Denbighshire.

Carter died at the age of 57 and was buried in St. George's Chapel, Denbigh.

== Family ==
Carter married Elizabeth Holland, daughter and co-heir of David Holland of Kinmel. The country people considered him as a rapacious oppressor and petty tyrant, and claimed that he forced the heiress of Kinmel to marry him. It was joked at the time that he betrayed his former trade by choosing the "best piece of Holland " in the County.
