= Griffith Bodwrda =

Welsh politician (1621–1677)

Griffith Bodwrda (1621–1677) was a Welsh politician who sat in the House of Commons at various times between 1656 and 1660.

Bodwrda was the son of Hugh Bodwrda of Bodwrda Carnarvonshire. Before 1646 he was granted the Wine Licence Office which had an income of £300 pa. He was also appointed Receiver of the First Fruits worth £200 pa and was Keeper of the Records of the Court of Common Pleas in 1656. In 1656 Bodwrda was elected Member of Parliament for Anglesey in the Second Protectorate Parliament. He was elected MP for Beaumaris in 1659 for the Third Protectorate Parliament.

In 1660, Bodwrda was re-elected MP for Beaumaris in the Convention Parliament. In October 1660 he was ordered by King Charles II to see to the dismantling of Carnarvon Castle and in 1666 he was charged with providing protection to refugees from the Great Fire of London who were displaced to Islington.

Parliament of England
Preceded by George Twistleton; William Foxwist	Member of Parliament for Anglesey; 1656; With: George Twistleton	Succeeded by George Twistleton
Preceded by Not represented in Protectorate Parliaments	Member of Parliament for Beaumaris; 1659	Succeeded by Not represented in Restored Rump
