= Denbigh Castle and town walls =

Ruined castle and fortifications in Denbigh, Wales

- Castell Dinbych a waliau tref
- Denbigh, Wales
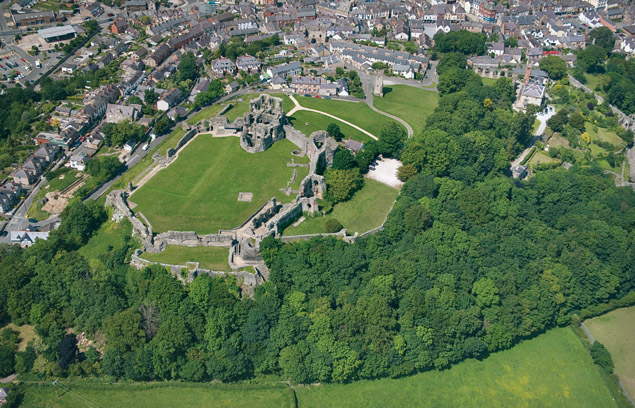
- Aerial view of the castle and town walls

Site information
- Owner: Cadw
- Condition: Ruined

Location
- Location in Wales
- Location within Wales
- Coordinates: 53.1806°N 3.4207°W

Site history
- In use: Open to public
- Events: Welsh Wars; Madog ap Llywelyn revolt Glyndŵr Rising; Wars of the Roses; English Civil War

Listed Building – Grade I

Denbigh Castle and town walls (/ˈdɛnbi/ DEN-bee; Welsh: Castell Dinbych a waliau tref [ˌkastɛɬ ˈdɪnbɨχ]) were built to control the lordship of Denbigh after the Conquest of Wales by Edward I of England in 1282. The lands were granted to Henry de Lacy, Earl of Lincoln, who began to build a new walled town, colonised by immigrants from England, protected by a substantial castle and surrounded by deer parks for hunting. The work had not been completed by 1294, when the Welsh temporarily seized the castle during the Madog ap Llywelyn revolt. The defences continued to be improved, although the castle was not completely finished by the time of Henry's death in 1311.

The castle passed between various owners in the first half of the 14th century, before coming under the control of the Mortimer family. Meanwhile, the walled town had proved impractical to live in, and a newer, much larger, settlement developed outside the defences. In 1400, the walled town was raided during the Glyndŵr Rising, although the castle itself remained secure throughout the rebellion. During the Wars of the Roses, Denbigh was attacked by Lancastrian forces; the walled town was attacked and burnt. In the aftermath, the old town was largely abandoned by its inhabitants, the walled area becoming an extension of the castle's defences.

During the First English Civil War, Denbigh was held by the Royalists until it was captured by Parliamentarian forces in October 1646. The castle was seized by pro-Royalist soldiers in 1659, after which General George Monk ordered it to be slighted, with various parts of the walls and towers being demolished. The site deteriorated further over the years and the old walled town remained almost deserted. In the middle of the 19th century, the town created a committee to manage the ruins and carried out restoration work. The Office of Works assumed responsibility for the fortifications in 1914, with the site ultimately passing into the control of the Welsh Cadw heritage agency.

Denbigh Castle is dominated by a triangle of three octagonal towers that forms its main entrance, considered by the historian John Goodall to be "the most architecturally sophisticated gatehouse of the thirteenth century". Eight mural towers protect the rest of its curtain wall, further protected by barbicans and a mantlet of defensive terraces and walls. The castle connects to the town walls, which remain largely intact and stretch for around 1,100 metres (3,600 ft) around the old town. The town walls were once protected by four towers and two gatehouses, although only one of the gatehouses still survives. The castle and town's gatehouse were constructed of decorative stonework, intended to symbolise royal authority and civic pride.

== History ==
=== 13th century ===
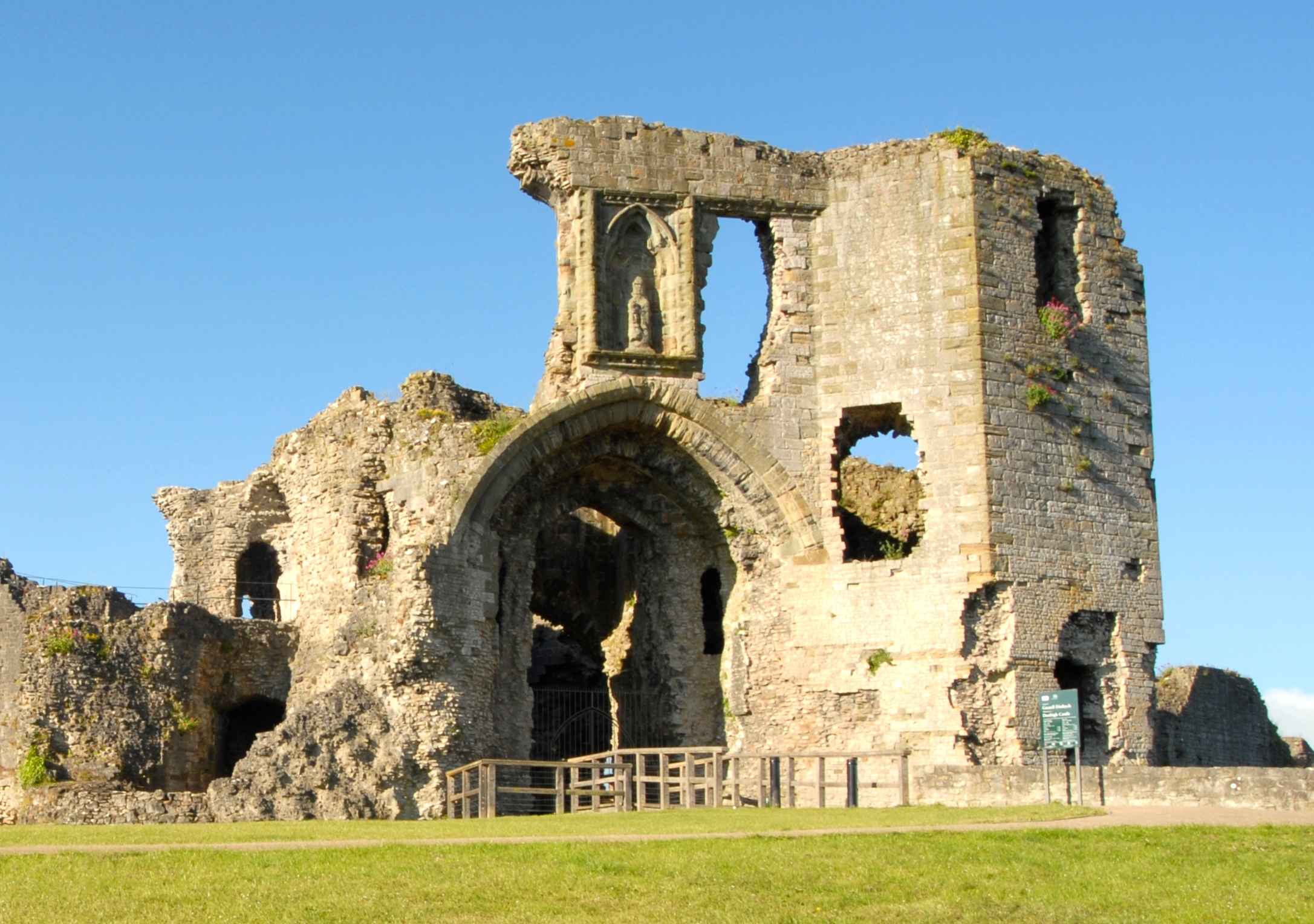
The exterior of the castle's gatehouse, showing the Porter's Lodge Tower (left) and the Prison Tower (right)

Denbigh Castle was constructed within what was originally the Welsh patrimony of Perfeddwlad. The patrimony controlled the pastoral farming lands on the Denbigh Moors and formed a royal residence, llys, for the Welsh princes. Perfeddwlad was strategically located along the Welsh border but its ownership was disputed and the territory was fought over by the Normans and Welsh many times during the 11th and 12th centuries.

In 1277, the Welsh prince Dafydd ap Gruffudd was granted Perfeddwlad by the English king, Edward I, who at the time was allied with Dafydd in his struggle against his brother Prince Llywelyn. Dafydd rebuilt the existing residence, creating a substantial castle. It is uncertain what form it took or exactly where on the current castle site it was located, but it included a bakehouse, buttery, chapel and a hall, and it became Dafydd's main stronghold. The Welsh called the settlement Dinbych, an abbreviation of Dinas Fechan, meaning "little fortress".

In 1282, Dafydd and Llywelyn rebelled against the King. Edward invaded North Wales with a huge army; after a month long siege, Dinbych fell to his forces in October 1282. The King created a new lordship to govern the district around Dinbych, which he renamed Denbigh and granted these lands to Henry de Lacy, the Earl of Lincoln. With the help of James of St George, the King's master mason, Edward and Henry made plans for the construction of a new castle to govern the area, symbolically placed on top of the former llys.

Edward continued into Snowdonia, leaving Henry to continue the work at Denbigh, using local labourers and possibly men brought from Henry's estates in England. The western and southern sides of the castle and the new town walls were built first, in order to protect the construction teams and by 1285, Henry gave the new town its first charter. Work on the rest of the defences continued for several years. The castle and town formed part of a wider landscape controlled by de Lacey, including a nearby manor, a dovecote, barn and fishponds, which were all important symbols of lordship during the period. He similarly established three parks around the castle, stocked with deer from England.

The town walls enclosed an area approximately 9.5 acres (3.8 ha) in size and held 63 burgesses in 1285, each of which promised to provide an armed man to help protect the settlement. The townsfolk were English, many from Henry's estates in northern England and were reinforced by further English colonists who acquired large areas of rural land around the region. From the earliest days of the new settlement; the inhabitants began to spread out beyond the walls onto the flatter ground further down the hill, spurred on by the limited space and poor water supply in the inner town. This was unusual compared to the experience of other walled towns established in Wales at the time and within fifty years the external villa mercatoria had come to cover around 57 acres (23 ha).

The building work on Denbigh Castle had not been completed by September 1294, when a Welsh revolt broke out, led by Madog ap Llywelyn. The castle was taken by Welsh forces, despite efforts by Henry to relieve it and the fortification was not recaptured until December. The castle's defences continued to be improved, although it was not completely finished, possibly because the project was disrupted by the death of Henry's eldest son in an accident at the castle.

=== 14th – 16th centuries ===
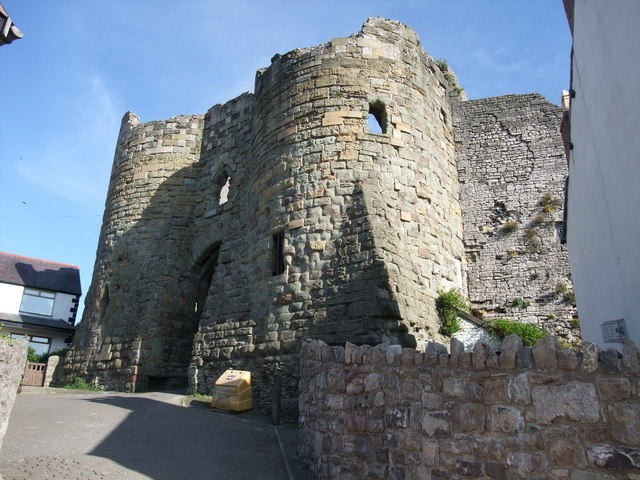
The exterior of the town's Burgess Gate, showing its distinctive defensive talus spurs

Henry de Lacy's daughter, Alice, inherited Denbigh Castle on his death in 1311. Alice was the wife of Thomas, the Earl of Lancaster, and the castle continued to be developed until Thomas was executed for treason in 1322. The following years were politically unstable and the castle was passed between several, short-lived, owners - Hugh Despenser, the Earl of Winchester and then Roger Mortimer, the Earl of March - before being held for a period by William Montagu. Work on the castle and the town walls continued throughout this period.

The Mortimer family reacquired the lordship in 1355 and carried out repairs over the next fifty years to the castle's stonework and timber. In 1400, Owain Glyndŵr led a revolt against the Crown and raided the town of Denbigh. Since Edmund Mortimer was only eight years old, King Henry IV placed Henry Percy in charge of Denbigh, until Percy defected to the rebels in 1403. Despite being isolated, Denbigh remained in royal hands through to the end of the rebellion in 1407. Edmund continued to hold the castle until he died, childless, in 1425, when ownership passed to Richard, the Duke of York.

During the Wars of the Roses, Denbigh was fought over by the rival Lancastrian and Yorkist factions. Jasper Tudor, the Earl of Pembroke and a Lancastrian supporter, was declared the constable of the castle by Henry VI in 1457 but the fortification remained in the hands of the Yorkists. After the Lancastrian victory at the Battle of Ludford Bridge, Jasper was able to force the garrison to surrender and finally took possession of the castle in 1460. The war then turned in favour of the Yorkists and despite the castle's new garrison holding out for several months under Roger Puleston, it was recaptured by Sir Richard Herbert in late 1461. The new Yorkist regime made William Herbert, Jasper's rival to the title of Earl of Pembroke, the constable and steward of Denbigh in 1467.

Jasper returned to Denbigh in 1468 and although he could not take the castle, he burnt the interior of the walled town. The attack spurred an exodus from the walled town to the newer suburbs. By the end of 16th century the inner area had been largely abandoned, coming to form part of the external defences of the castle and the Burgess Gate on the town walls became the town jail. In 1586, the antiquarian William Camden could observe that the "old town is now deserted".

Much of the castle had fallen into decline by 1530 but six years later the castle became the centre for administrating the new county of Denbighshire, with the great gatehouse and nearby towers being used as a courthouse, prison and associated buildings by the county authorities. The remainder of the castle had fallen into ruin by 1561. Robert Dudley, later made the Earl of Leicester, was granted a lease of the castle in 1563, partially because the Crown was trying to reduce the costs of maintaining the dilapidated property.

During Dudley's tenure, Denbigh Castle was used as a place of imprisonment for those considered traitors by the officials of the Crown, including many dissidents towards the Elizabethan religious settlement. The most famous such prisoner was the Welsh poet and underground Catholic schoolmaster Richard Gwyn, who was imprisoned at Denbigh Castle from September 1581 to the Spring of 1582.

After Gwyn's execution on 15 October 1584, his head and one of his quarters were spiked upon Denbigh Castle. The other three quarters were similarly displayed at Wrexham, Ruthin Castle, and Holt Castle.

On 25 October 1970 Pope Paul VI presided over the canonization ceremony in Rome for St. Richard Gwyn, as one of the Forty Martyrs of England and Wales.

The Catholic Church in England commemorates Gwyn with a feast day together with all the 284 canonized and beatified martyrs of the English Reformation on 4 May. The Catholic Church in Wales commemorates him on the feast day of the Six Welsh Martyrs: priests Philip Evans and John Lloyd, John Jones, David Lewis, John Roberts, the layman Richard Gwyn, and their companions, every year on 25 October.

During his rule, Dudley also built a large Anglican parish church in the walled town, possibly intending it to become a cathedral and carried out some minor repairs to the castle but little other work was completed before his death in 1588.

=== 17th century ===
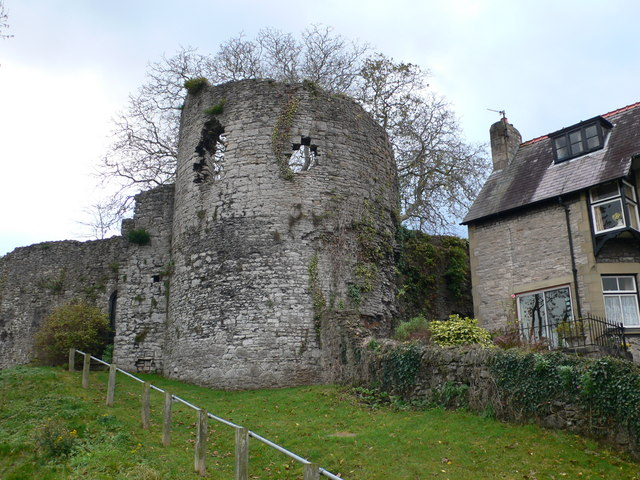
The North-Eastern Tower on the town walls

When the First English Civil War broke out in August 1642, North Wales was solidly Royalist, and Denbigh Castle was held by a garrison of 500 under Colonel William Salesbury, who made repairs to the defences. By late 1645, the war had turned against the Royalists, and Charles I spent three days at the castle after his defeat at Rowton Heath in September.

The following month, a Royalist army under the command of Sir William Vaughan gathered at Denbigh Green, close to the ruins of Denbigh Friary, intending to march to Chester to relieve the forces under siege there. Before this, Vaughan was attacked and defeated by a force commanded by Sir Thomas Mytton, and some of the Royalist soldiers retreated into the castle in the aftermath. Mytton took the outer parts of Denbigh but could not break into the walled town or the castle.

Mytton returned the next year with additional equipment and placed the castle and the walled town under a close siege in April 1646, erecting earthwork bastions for his guns along the eastern site of Denbigh. The Goblin Tower along the town walls, which contained the garrison's main well, was bombarded with artillery and Mytton placed more guns on nearby Galch Hill to attack the south-western side of the walls. With only one artillery piece of his own and no Royalist reinforcements likely, Salesbury's position appeared hopeless but he held on, arguing that he had given assurances to the King that he would not surrender the castle. Finally, Charles I sent Salebsury a message, personally ordering him to give up Denbigh; after negotiations, Salesbury agreed to surrender on good terms on 26 October.

After Salesbury departed, Parliament installed a small garrison in the castle, under the command of Colonel George Twistleton, the new governor. It was used as a prison for political prisoners, including David Pennant, the High Sheriff of Flintshire and there was an abortive Royalist attempt in 1648 to break into the castle to rescue the inmates.

In 1659, Sir George Booth led an uprising of Royalist and Presbyterian leaders against the Commonwealth government. A group of Royalist soldiers seized Denbigh Castle in August and took the garrison prisoner. After Booth's defeat at the Battle of Winnington Bridge a few weeks later, the rebels surrendered and the government retook the castle. General George Monck then ordered it to be slighted, put beyond military use. The republican politician John Carter demolished parts of the curtain walls and two towers over the course of six weeks. The site fell further into ruin over the remainder of the century, with its stone being reused to build houses in the town. When granted briefly in 1696 to William Bentinck, the Earl of Portland, complaints were made in Parliament and it reverted to the Crown.

=== 18th – 21st centuries ===
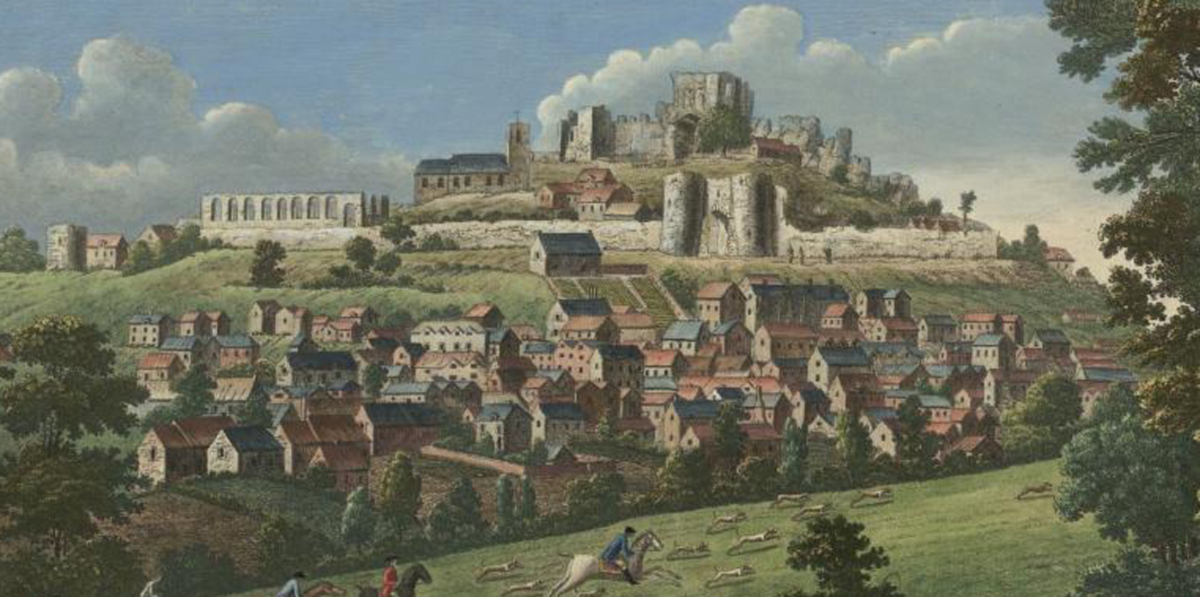
A depiction of the castle and town walls around 1750, showing the slighted ruins of the castle

Denbigh Castle remained ruined, although a new grammar school was built in the walled town in 1726 and a bowling green was established around 1769. Castle House, a large private dwelling, was also constructed there in either the second quarter or the middle of the century, using stone taken from the castle ruins and Leicester's church. In the middle of the 19th century, the historian John Williams observed that the walled town remained otherwise deserted, with only three irregular rows of cottages, holding a total of 163 inhabitants; these dwellings attracted complaint from the writer Samuel Lewis, who argued that they "materially diminished the interest excited by the ruins". The western tower of the Burgess Gate was then being used as a private house, as had the eastern tower until a few years before.

In the middle of the 19th century, the town created a "Castle Committee" to maintain the ruins; the Crown leased the committee control of the castle and in 1879 lent them £300 to fund repairs to the ruins. The Crown reclaimed control of the Burgess Gate from its occupants and carried out conservation work, before then leasing the gatehouse to the committee in 1908. In 1914, the central government's Office of Works took over responsibility for the site and during the late 1950s, its successor organisation, the Ministry of Works, first bought and then demolished various later buildings along the walls to clear the area for research and visitors.

In the 21st century, Denbigh Castle and the town walls are maintained by the Welsh heritage agency Cadw. The castle is open to visitors, receiving 10,154 in 2015 and parts of the extant walls are also open to visitors. £600,000 was invested by Cadw in the castle and walls during the mid-2010s, financing the construction of a new visitors' centre. The site is protected under UK law as a scheduled monument and the castle as a grade I listed building.

== Architecture ==
=== Castle ===
Plan of the castle; A - Red Tower; B - Prison Tower; C - Porter's Lodge Tower; D - Bishop's Tower; E - Badnes Tower; F - Great Hall; G - Great Kitchen Tower; H - Tower-next-Treasure-House; I - pigeon house; J - Green Chambers; K - White Chamber and Pitcher House towers; L - Treasure House Tower; M - Upper Gate and Postern Tower

Denbigh Castle is located on a naturally defensible, rocky outcrop above the Clwyd valley, with the walled town just beneath it to the north. The castle comprises a large gatehouse, with a curtain wall and mural towers encircling an inner area approximately 350 by 260 feet (107 by 79 m) across. The historian John Goodall considers the fortification to be "one of the outstanding architectural creations of the Welsh conquest".

The Great Gatehouse is formed by a triangle of octagonal towers around a central octagonal hall, protected by a barbican. The gatehouse was built using decorative bands of masonry in different colours, intended to symbolise Edward I's royal authority and displayed a statue, probably of Edward II, over the main entrance. The complex was defended with a 30-foot (9.1 m) wide ditch, a drawbridge, murder holes and a portcullis. The three towers making up the gatehouse have individual names: the Porter's Lodge and Prison towers face outwards and the Badnes Tower, possibly named after an early constable of the castle, lies to the rear. Goodall considers the building to be "the most architecturally sophisticated gatehouse of the thirteenth century" and notes that the architectural ideas were later "reworked to brilliant effect" at Knaresborough.

To the east of the gatehouse is the site of the Queen's Chapel, since destroyed and the castle well, which is over 50 feet (15 m) deep. The hexagonal, three-storey Great Kitchen Tower and the White Chamber Tower, which was slighted after the English Civil War, flank the foundations of the Great Hall. Further south is the Pitcher House Tower, probably used for storing water during the summer months and the Green Chambers, so called because of the colour of their Gwespyr stonework. The chambers have basements specially designed for the storage of meat and wine and the upper storeys originally contained exceptionally fine accommodation.

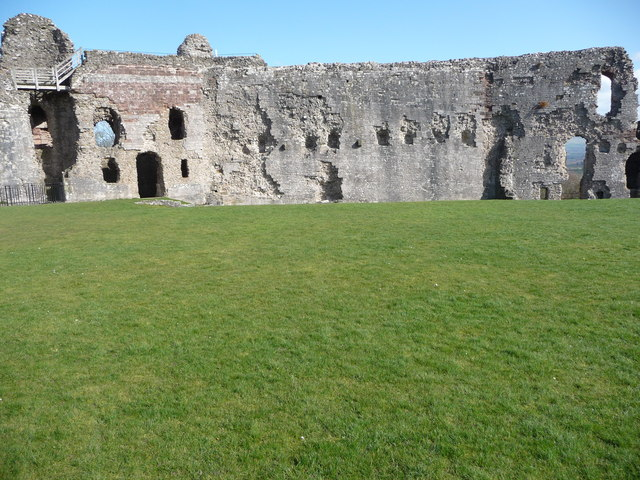
Part of the walls of Denbigh Castle

At the southern end of the castle, the Postern Tower, originally three storeys high, links the castle to one end of the town walls. The adjacent Upper Gate and the Postern Gate formed a rear entrance to the castle, protected by another barbican, drawbridges and a steep passageway.

A mantlet of defensive terraces and cross-walls stretches around the south and eastern sides of the castle and originally prevented the undermining of the mural towers and thinnest stretches of the curtain wall. This side of the castle was protected by the Treasure House Tower, which held the Treasure House; the Tower-next-Treasure House; the Bishop's Tower, containing a sally port and the octagonal Red Tower, named after the red sandstone used in its construction, which linked to the other end of the town wall circuit. Stables, a blacksmith's workshop and storehouses once ran along the inside of the south-western corner of the castle.

=== Town walls ===
Plan of castle and town walls; A - Burgess Gate; B - North-Eastern Tower; C - Lord Leicester's Church; D - Countess Tower; Exchequer Gate; F - St Hilary's Chapel; G - Goblin Tower; H - castle

The town walls stretch for around 1,100 metres (3,600 ft) from the north edge of the castle to its southeastern tip and mostly remain intact. The walls were built in the 13th century and originally protected by four mural towers, positioned in a disorderly pattern; the two gatehouses and the defences along the eastern salient were added in the 14th century.

Only the foundations of the Exchequer Gate on the western side of the walls remain but the gatehouse would originally have been protected by two circular towers, with a rectangular talus base to prevent undermining. The walls between the Exchequer and Burgess Gate at the north-west corner of the circuit are intact. The Burgess Gate has two circular towers protecting a vaulted passage way, again with a distinctive talus base. The gatehouse is built from white limestone and yellow sandstone, with the stonework forming a chequered design; this was a common decorative approach at the time and would have symbolised local civic pride. Although the top courses have been lost, the gatehouse might originally have stood up to 60 feet (18 m) tall. The section of the walls to the east of the Burgess Gate has been lost.

The walled circuit recommences in the north-east corner of the town, where the walls survive up to 15 feet (4.6 m) high, further protected by the two-storey tall North-Eastern Tower. On the eastern side of the walls, the original defences had been set back from the edge of a rocky salient, protected by the Countess Tower, an angular, two-storey building with two towers. The defences were adapted to follow the outer edge of the salient, with the Goblin Tower built on the outermost point, overlooking the edge of the cliffs. The Goblin Tower is a hexagonal, two-storey tower, protecting a deep well that formed the only reliable source of water for the defences during the summer.

The walled circuit continues south, meeting the Bastion Tower in the south-east corner. The Bastion Tower was originally three storeys tall and was decorated with chequered sandstone and limestone in a similar fashion to the Burgess Gate.

== See also ==
- Castles in Great Britain and Ireland
- List of castles in Wales

== Bibliography ==
- Anonymous (1908). Bye-gones Relating to Wales and the Border Counties. 1907–1908. London, UK: Elliot Stock. OCLC 656559286.
- Brown, R. Allen (1989). Castles from the Air. Cambridge, UK: Cambridge University Press. ISBN 978-0-521-32932-3.
- Butler, L. A. S. (2007). Denbigh Castle (rev. ed.). Cardiff, UK: Cadw. ISBN 978-1-85760-238-8.
- Cadw (2010). Denbigh: Understanding Urban Character. Cardiff, UK: Cadw. ISBN 978-1-85760-281-4.
- Creighton, Oliver; Higham, Robert (2005). Medieval Town Walls: An Archaeology and Social History of Urban Defence. Stroud, UK: Tempus. ISBN 978-0-7524-1445-4.
- Davis, Paul R. (2007). Castles of the Welsh Princes. Talybont, UK: Y Lolfa. ISBN 978-0-86243-970-5.
- Evans, Howell T. (1915). Wales and the Wars of the Roses. Cambridge, UK: Cambridge University Press. OCLC 499598683.
- Goodall, John (2010). "The Baronial Castles of the Welsh Conquest". In Williams, Diane; Kenyon, John (eds.). The Impact of Edwardian Castles in Wales. Oxford, UK: Oxbow Books. pp. 155–165. ISBN 978-1-84217-380-0.
- Goodall, John (2011). The English Castle, 1066–1650. New Haven, US and London, UK: Yale University Press. ISBN 978-0-30011-058-6.
- Hemp, Wilfred James; Radford, Courtenay Arthur Ralegh (1965) [1943]. Denbigh Castle and Town Walls. London, UK: Her Majesty's Stationery Office. OCLC 557815987.
- Henning, Basil Duke (1983). The House of Commons, 1660–1690. Vol. 1. London, UK: Martin Secker and Warburg. ISBN 978-0-436-19274-6.
- Liddiard, Robert (2005). Castles in Context: Power, Symbolism and Landscape, 1066 to 1500. Macclesfield, UK: Windgather Press. ISBN 978-0-9545575-2-2.
- Manganiello, Stephen C. (2004). The Concise Encyclopedia of the Revolutions and Wars of England, Scotland, and Ireland, 1639-1660. Oxford, UK: Scarecrow Press. ISBN 978-0-8108-5100-9.
- Royal Commission on Ancient Monuments in Wales and Monmouthshire (1912). Minutes of Evidence Given Before the Royal Commission on Ancient Monuments in Wales and Monmouthshire. Vol. I. London, UK: His Majesty's Stationery Office. OCLC 757802640.
- Turner, Hilary L. (1970). Town Defences in England and Wales. London, UK: John Baker. ISBN 978-0-212-98384-1.
- Turner, Rick (2010). "The Life and Career of Richard the Engineer". In Williams, Diane; Kenyon, John (eds.). The Impact of Edwardian Castles in Wales. Oxford, UK: Oxbow Books. pp. 46–58. ISBN 978-1-84217-380-0.
- Walker, David (1990). Medieval Wales. Cambridge, UK: Cambridge University Press. ISBN 978-0-521-31153-3.
- Williams, John (1856). Ancient and Modern Denbigh: A Descriptive History of the Castle, Borough and Liberties. Denbigh, UK: J. Williams. OCLC 9352877.
