= Gwydir Castle =

Historic building in Conwy, Wales

Coordinates: 53.1328°N 3.8010°W

- Castell Gwydir (Welsh)
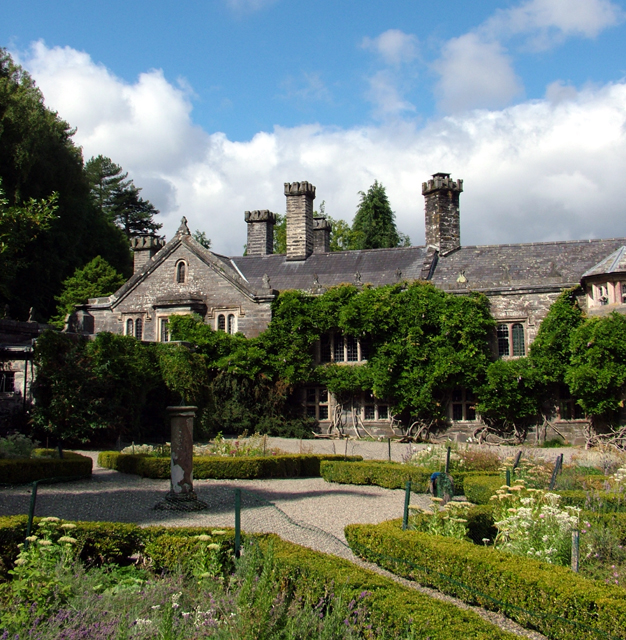
- Interactive map of the Gwydir Castle area

General information
- Location: Llanrwst, Conwy, Wales
- Year built: c. 1500

Gwydir Castle (Welsh: Castell Gwydir, pronounced [ˈkastɛɬ ˈɡwɨdir]) is in the Conwy valley, Wales, a mile west of the market town of Llanrwst and 1.5 miles (2.4 km) south of the large village of Trefriw. An example of a fortified manor house dating back to c. 1500, it is located on the edge of the floodplain of the river Conwy, and overlooked from the west by the slopes of Gwydir Forest.

== Etymology ==
The name Gwydir might derive from the Welsh gwo- 'under, low' and tir 'land', referring to the land beside the river Conwy. Sir John Wynn's The History of the Gwydir Family makes reference to the fact that some consider it a compound of Gwy and tir [wet + land] or of Gwaed and tir [blood + land]. Any similarity with the Welsh word gwydr 'glass' is coincidental.

== History ==
There have been fortifications associated with this site since AD 600. In the Early Middle Ages, numerous skirmishes were fought in the area between the post-Roman kingdoms of Wales. Two significant encounters were in AD 610, when Llywarch Hen, a bardic prince of Rheged, fought a bloody battle nearby and later when the Kingdoms of Gwynedd and Deheubarth fought a major battle near Llanrwst in AD 954.

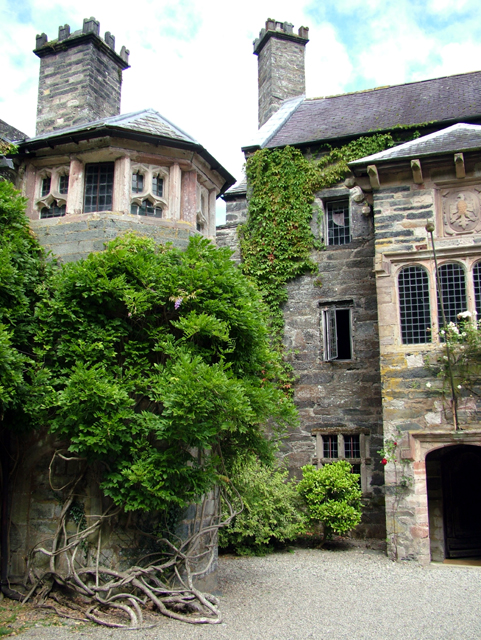
The entrance

By the 14th century, the Welsh knight Hywel Coetmor (d.1440), whose family had fought in the Hundred Years' War as commanders of longbowmen under Edward, the Black Prince at the Battle of Poitiers in 1356, is recorded as the first owner of a manor house on the site. He would later fight in the Battle of Shrewsbury (1402) and Agincourt (1415) before going on to support the rising led by Owain Glyndŵr.

By the 16th century, Gwydir had become the seat of the powerful Wynn family who were descendants of the Kings of Gwynedd. The Wynns were one of the most significant families of north Wales during the Tudor and Stuart periods.

Following the Wars of the Roses, the castle was rebuilt by Meredith ap Ieuan ap Robert, the founder of the Wynn dynasty. The house incorporated re-used mediaeval material from the dissolved Maenan Abbey. The square turret at the rear of the Solar Tower contains a spiral staircase taken from the Abbey and many elaborately carved stones can also be seen. The turret was added around 1540 and John Wyn ap Maredudd's initials can be seen above the main entrance in the courtyard gatehouse along with the date of 1555. The surviving buildings date from around the year 1500, and there were alterations and additions in c. 1540, c. 1600 and c. 1828, the latter after Lord Willoughby had undertaken some demolition work in c. 1819.

Although called a castle, it is an example of a Tudor architecture courtyard house or fortified manor house, rather than a traditional castle, such as those built in North Wales by Llywelyn the Great and Edward I.

Gwydir was home to Katheryn of Berain. Charles I is said to have visited Gwydir in 1645 as the guest of Sir Richard Wynn, 2nd Baronet, Treasurer to Queen Henrietta Maria, and Groom of the Royal Bed Chamber.

More recently, King George V and Queen Mary stayed here as the Duke and Duchess of York, in April 1899.

=== Gwydir estate ===
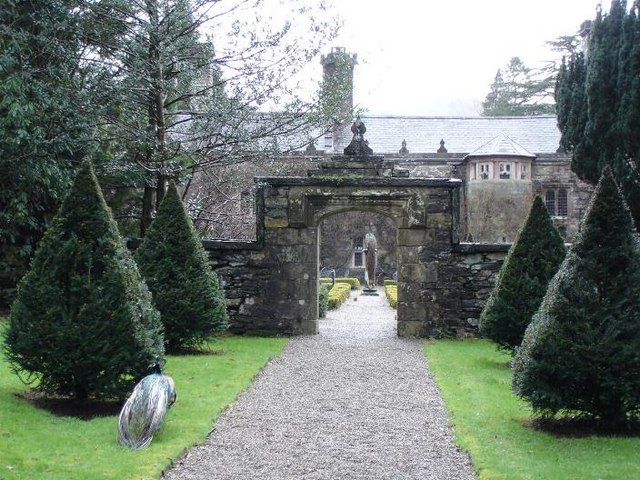
The yew walk

During the 16th and 17th centuries, the Gwydir Estate under the Wynn family dominated north Wales, and at the centre of this huge estate, Gwydir itself stood in a deer park of some 36,000 acres (150 km^{2}). In 1678, it passed by marriage to the Barons Willoughby de Eresby (when Mary Wynn married Robert Bertie, 1st Duke of Ancaster and Kesteven, then Lord Willoughby de Eresby), based in Lincolnshire (Dukes of Ancaster and Kesteven in 1715–1779, and from 1892 Earls of Ancaster). The 18th century consequently saw a period of some neglect (but in 1796 the title of Baron Gwydyr was created for Peter Burrell, 1st Baron Gwydyr, husband of Priscilla Bertie, 21st Baroness Willoughby de Eresby, who acted as Lord Great Chamberlain in 1780–1820), and by the early 19th century the estate largely comprised the parishes of Dolwyddelan (where the Wynns also had an ancestral home), Llanrhychwyn, Trefriw, and Gwydir, totalling some 55 square miles (140 km^{2}). This land, however, was mostly mountainous and of poor quality, and although there were some 30 slate mines on the land, of varying sizes, this slate was not of a particularly good standard, much of it more suited to slabs than roofing slate. Nor was production high, and the output of all the quarries over the 150 years of their existence totalled, for instance, just two years' worth of output from the Blaenau Ffestiniog quarries. Prior to the arrival of the railway in the 1860s, most slate was carried by cart to the quays at Trefriw. The estate also owned a number of mineral mines, mostly in the area of today's Gwydir Forest.

The principal quarries on the estate were located around Dolwyddelan, where a syncline compressed the Nod Glas mudstones into slate veins. These were the Prince Llewellyn, Chwarel Ddu, Ty'n-y-bryn and Rhiw-goch quarries.

Much of the estate was, however, under continuous mortgage, and in 1894 Dolwyddelan was sold off, followed in the next two years by most of Llanrhychwyn and Trefriw. The sale of the house in 1921 by the Earl Carrington saw it passing out of inherited ownership for the first time in over 400 years, and virtually all other lands were subsequently sold off. Today the estate comprises just the 10 acres (40,000 m^{2}) in which Gwydir Castle sits.

== 20th century ==
In 1921, the panelled main dining room from the 1640s was stripped, the carved and gilded panelling being bought at auction by William Randolph Hearst, the American press baron. On his death, the panels were inherited by the Metropolitan Museum of Art and until recently were kept in storage at the museum. The new owners of Gwydir, Peter Welford and Judy Corbett, traced these panels and negotiated with the museum, which sold the panels back to the Corbetts. They have been carefully replaced in their original setting, and the restored dining room was re-opened in July 1998 at a ceremony attended by the Prince of Wales.

In 1922, a fire broke out and gutted the Solar Tower, leaving it roofless. A subsequent fire in the West Wing made the place untenable, and it was abandoned, remaining unoccupied until 1944. In this year it was bought by Arthur Clegg, a retired bank manager, who, together with his wife and son, started a 20-year programme of renovation.

The castle is now privately owned by Peter Welford and his wife, Judy Corbett. They purchased the castle in 1994. They then began a programme of restoration to restore the 15th-century Tudor castle to its former glory. The story of the restoration is told in Judy Corbett's book Castles in the Air.

== Gardens ==
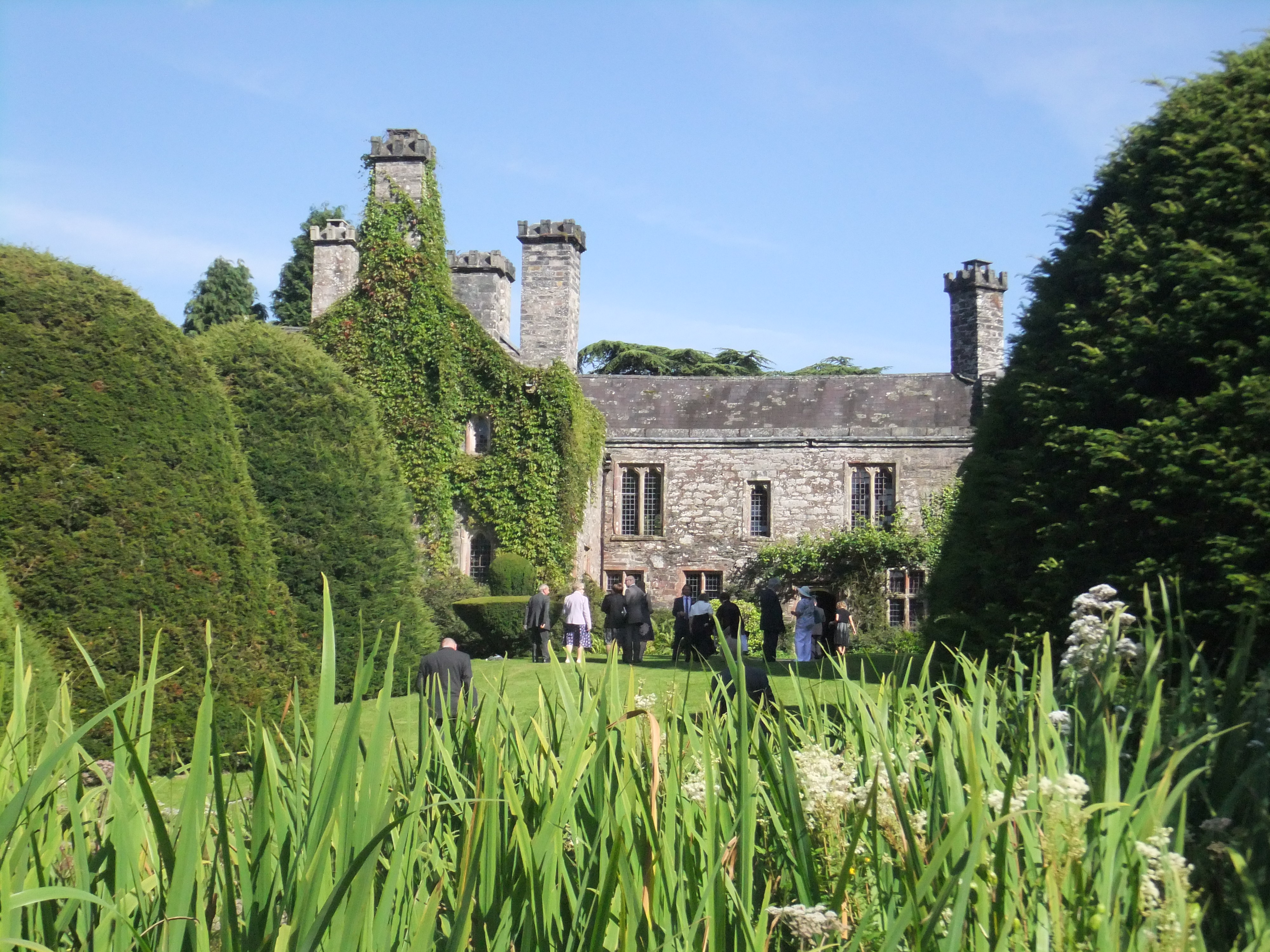
Gwydir Castle viewed from the Dutch garden

The castle is set within a Grade I listed, 10-acre (40,000 m^{2}) garden, which contains some ancient cedars — one of which was planted in 1625 to commemorate the wedding of King Charles I to Queen Henrietta Maria. One yew tree, known as the "Lovers Tree" or "Giant Yew", is estimated to be between 600 and 1,000 years old, and therefore pre-dates the castle itself.

The raised terrace contains an imposing Renaissance arch, probably dating from the 1590s. The Old Dutch garden contains ancient yew topiary and an octagonal fountain. The Royal and Statesman's gardens contain Welsh Oaks planted during the royal visit of 1899, and in 1911. An Elizabethan causeway called the Chinese Walk runs across the fields to the River Conwy, where the remains of the Gwydir Quay can be seen. The River Conwy was tidal up to this point, but silting has limited most tides to below Gowers Bridge.

== Gwydir Uchaf Chapel ==
Gwydir Uchaf Chapel, in the woods above Gwydir Castle, was built in 1673 by Sir Richard Wynn as a family memorial chapel for the Wynns of Gwydir. The simple exterior provides a direct contrast with its beautifully painted ceiling, depicting the Creation, the Trinity and the Last Judgement.

This chapel should not be confused with the one adjoining Llanrwst Church, called Gwydir Chapel. (This was built in 1633 by an earlier Sir Richard Wynn, and is said to have been designed by Inigo Jones. It has elaborate wood panelling, several family tombs and a stone coffin said to be that of Llywelyn ab Iorwerth, moved from Maenan Abbey at the Dissolution.) The chapel is still owned by the Willoughby family who were the hereditary owners of Gwydir Castle. It is now managed by Cadw. In 2024, it was announced that Cadw would rename the chapel to use the Welsh name Capel Gwydir Uchaf in English, as part of an effort to standardise the names in both languages.

== See also ==
- List of gardens in Wales
- Grey Mare's Tail
- Wynn baronets
- Baron Gwydyr
