= Owen Gethin Jones =

Welsh building contractor, quarry owner and poet

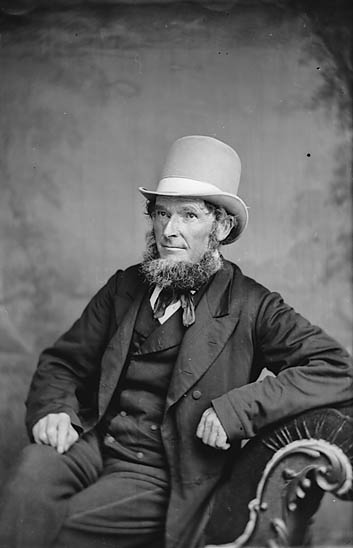
- Owen Gethin Jones around 1875
- Born: 1 May 1816; Penmachno
- Died: 29 January 1883 (aged 66)
- Citizenship: British

Owen Gethin Jones (1816 - 1883), was a Welsh building contractor, quarry owner and prominent poet.

== Early life ==
Jones was born on 1 May 1816 at Tyn-y-Cae, Penmachno, to parents Owen and Grace Jones.

== Family ==
In 1843, Jones married Ann Owen of Bwlch Bach, Dolwyddelan. Their son Owen Jones died in 1877 of liver failure. Their youngest daughter Jeanie G. Jones was married in 1884.

== Writer ==
Jones was a prominent poet in Eisteddfod circles and was a noted local historian. His essay on Penmachno, written in the mid 19th century, was first published in 1884 (after his death) in "Gweithiau Gethin" (The Works of Gethin). The essay refers to the first nonconformist sermon in the parish in about 1784 at Penrhyn Uchaf; it describes the buildings at Dugoed farm (53.053°N 3.782°W) (the oldest part of the farmhouse was built around 1517) and reflects on the possible sites of historical significance on the farm itself, including Tomen y Castell as a possible fort and the field Cae'r Braint ("Field of Honour") which may have contained a great Bardic circle.

In 1875, he was a member of the committee organising the National Eisteddfod in Pwllheli.

== Contractor and quarry owner ==
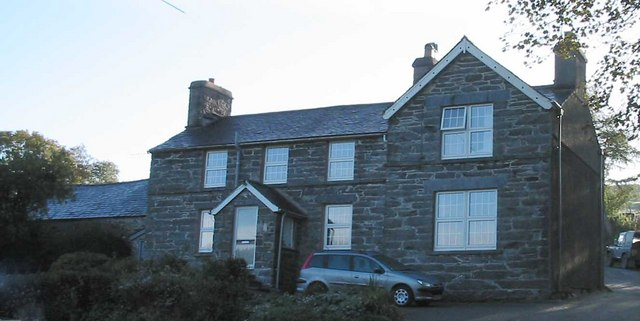
Tyddyn Cethin

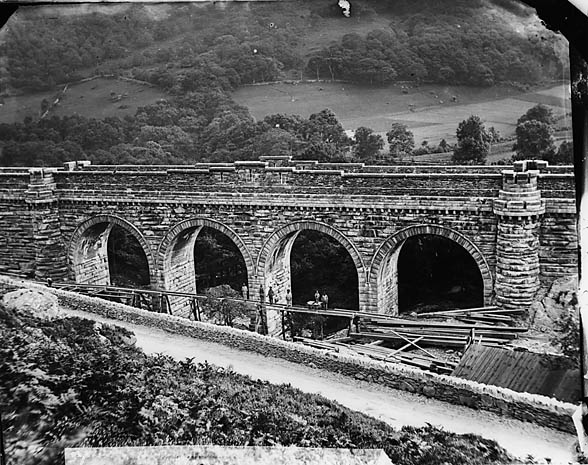
Pont Gethin under construction in 1875

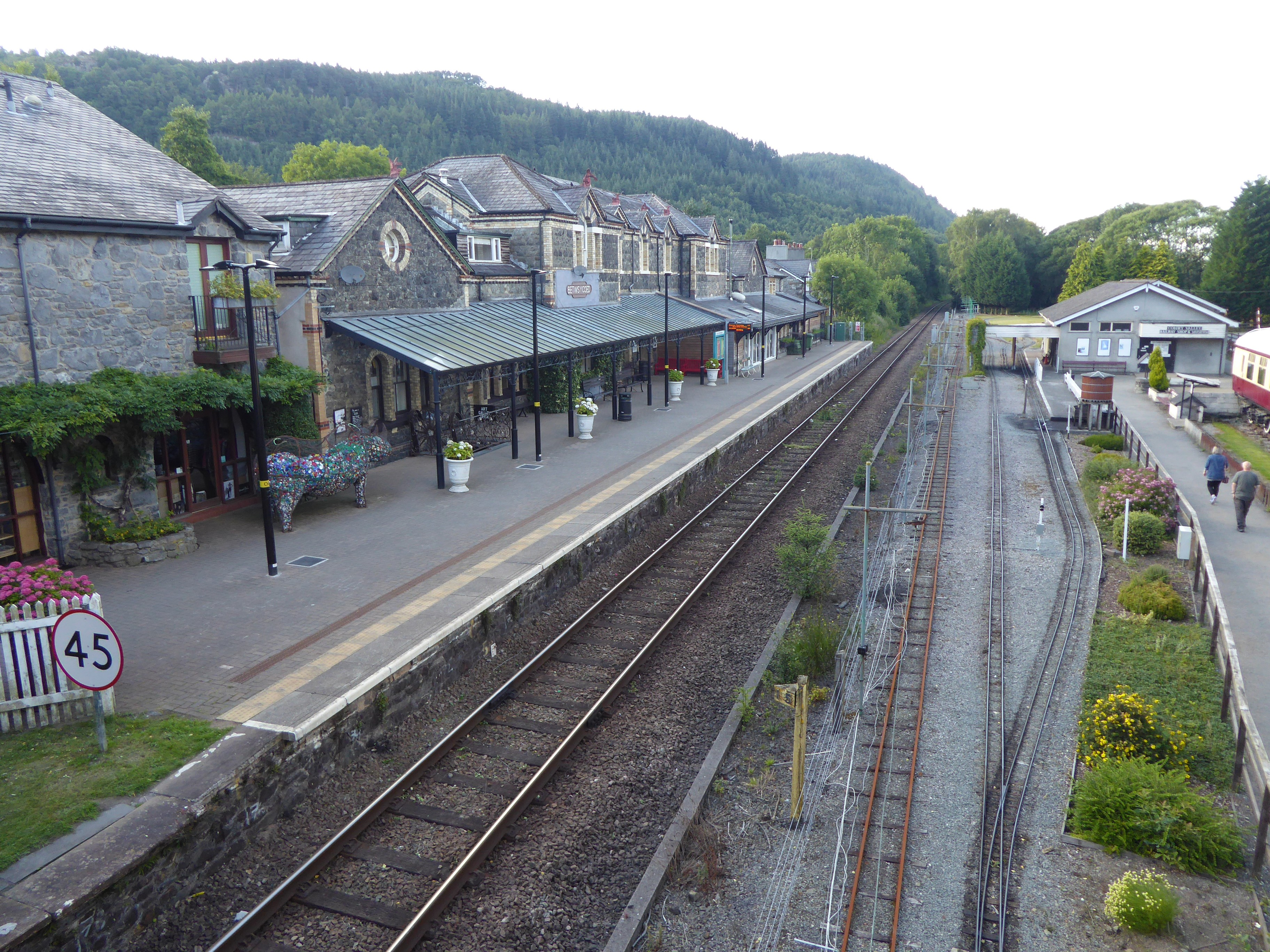
The station building at Betws-y-coed

Between 1861 and 1863, Jones built the Rhiwbach Tramway serving eight of the slate quarries at Blaenau Ffestiniog. He also built the Betws-y-Coed and Pont-y-Pant stations and the Pont Gethin viaduct on the Conwy Valley Line spanning the Lledr Valley, and St Mary's Church, Betws-y-Coed.

Jones built the parsonage at Llandrillo, Denbighshire in 1872.

In the mid 1870s, Jones opened the Bwlch Gordduant quarry in the Crimea Pass between Blaenau Ffestiniog and Dolwyddelan. This was not a great success and he sold the quarry to the owner of the Prince Llewellyn quarry in late 1876.

== Death ==
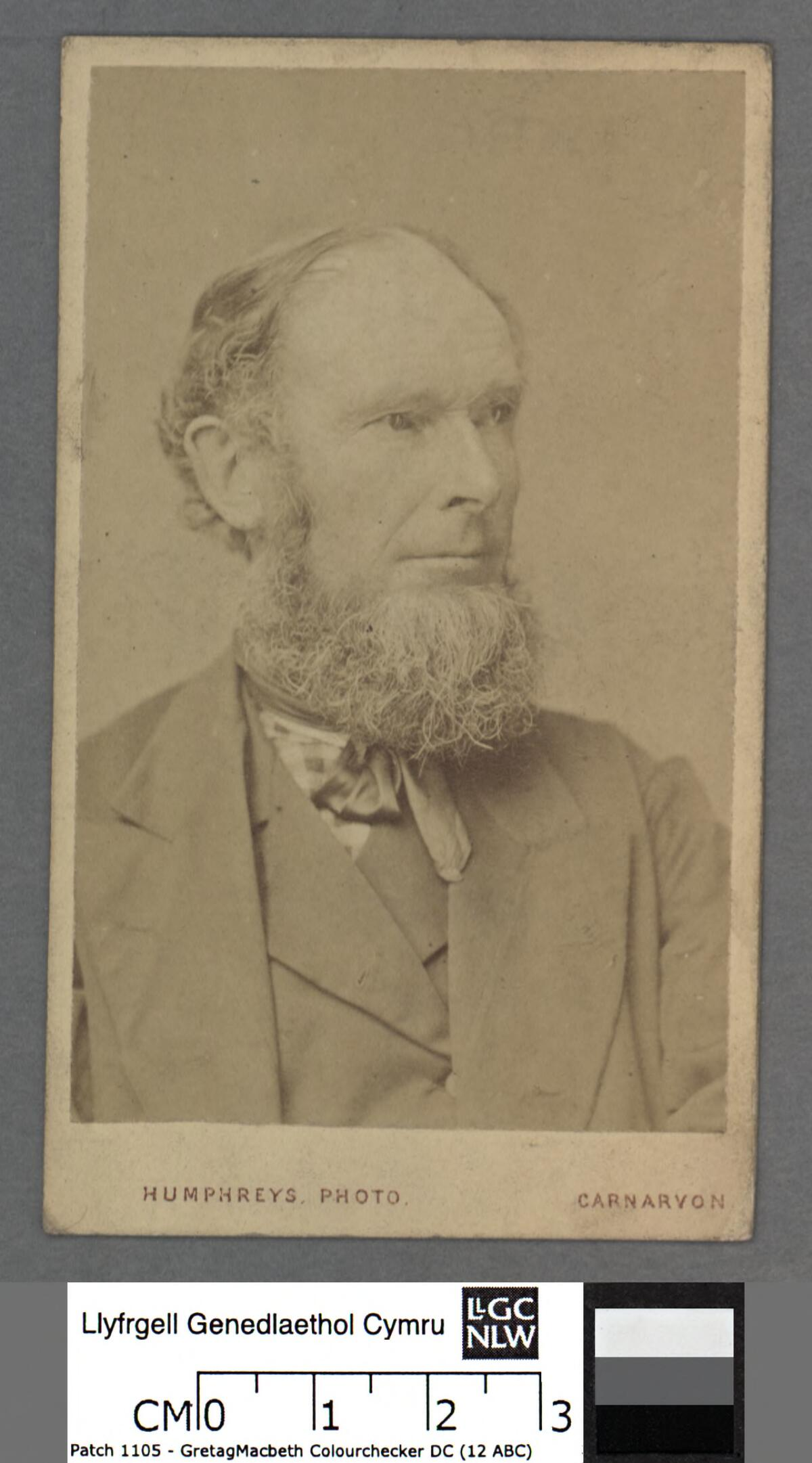
Jones circa 1880

In early 1882, Jones was paralysed and subsequently confined to his home. He died on 29 January 1883, at Tyddyn Cethin in Penmachno (as recorded in 1871 and 1881 Wales censuses and National Probate Calendar for 1883, but currently known as Tyddyn Gethin (transl. Home of Gethin or Gethin House)) .
