= Rhiw-goch quarry, Conwy =

Disused slate quarry in north Wales

Rhiw-goch
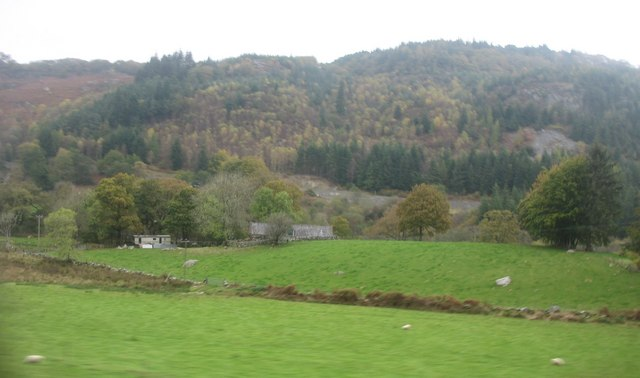
- Trees now surround Rhiw-goch quarry

- Location in Conwy
- Location: near Dolwyddelan, Carnarvonshire (now Conwy County Borough), Wales, UK; 53.066°N 3.868°W SH 749 537
- Products: Slate
- Type: Quarry
- Opened: 1860s
- Active: 1860s–1890s; 1904–1908
- Closed: 1908

Rhiw-goch quarry (also known as Brandreath quarry) was a slate quarry that was worked from the 1860s to 1908. It stands on the north side of the Afon Lledr, on the opposite side of the valley from Pont-y-Pant railway station.

== History ==
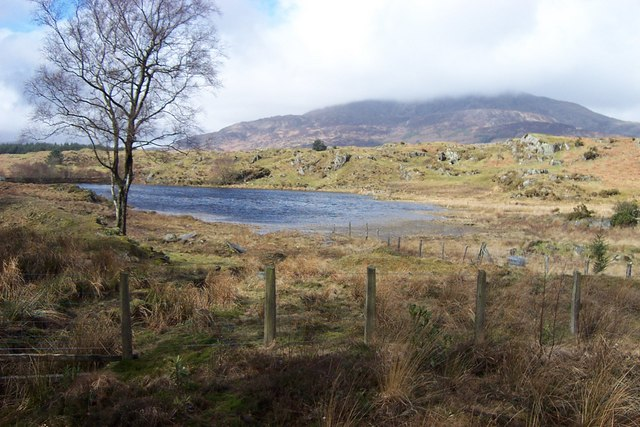
The quarry reservoir in 2006

The quarry opened in the 1860s and was initially worked into the hillside on an outcrop of the Nod Glas Formation. As the quarry expanded, an open pit was dug down into the slate vein.

In 1874, the quarry, which had been in local ownership, was sold to a Mr. Blackwell, who spent a great deal to re-equip the quarry. In 1876, Blackwell contracted Issac Hughes of Rhyl to build a large reservoir in the hills above the quarry. The same year, he appointed David E. Davies as his manager. Davies went on to manage the nearby Ty'n-y-bryn quarry, and died in 1902. A mill was built to the south-east of the pit, likely in 1876 or 1877. The reservoir fed the waterwheel that powered the mill. A water turbine was installed at the mill before 1880, a notably early date for equipment of this sort in the Welsh slate industry.

In 1887, a new company, the Rhiw-Goch Slate Company Limited was formed to take over the quarry. The company offered 600 shares at £25 each to the public. The new company started extending the mill on the north-east side of the waterwheel, though it may never have been completed. The quarry closed in the 1890s.

In 1904, the quarry re-opened and a new quarry, called Ty'n-y-fallen quarry was opened to the north-east of the mill, connected by a short tramway. This venture was unsuccessful and the quarry closed for the last time in 1908.

== Geology ==
The quarry worked slate from the Nod Glas Formation, which outcrops along the Lledr Valley. Through most of its length, the Nod Glas is black shale, but in the area around Dolwyddelan a syncline compressed the shales and it developed enough cleavage to be worked as slate.

== Transport ==
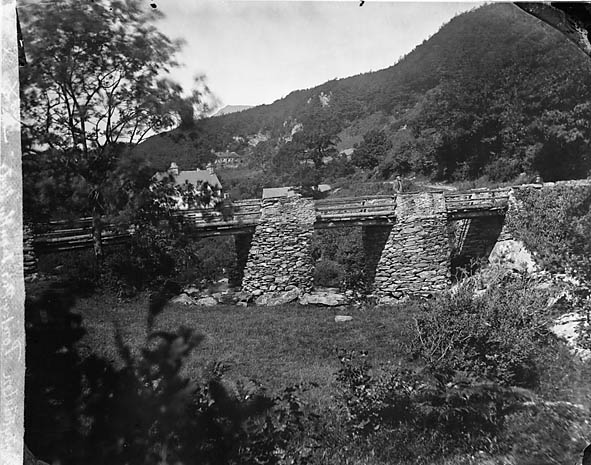
The bridge across the Afon Lledr that connected the quarry to Pont-y-Pant railway station

Within the quarry, tunnels led from the pit to the mill, with hand-worked tramways to carry the rock. A longer tramway was built to connect to Ty'n-y-fallen quarry in 1904. Construction started on a long incline from the mill down to the Dolwyddelan to Betws-y-Coed road around 1877, but it was never completed. Carnarvonshire Council denied the quarry's application to build a tramway across the road, on a level crossing; this may have been the reason for the incline's abandonment.

Finished product from the mill was carted across the river to Pont-y-Pant railway station over a fine slate and timber bridge. At the station it was loaded onto LNWR trains bound for Deganwy quay.
