= Roman Bridge railway station =

Railway station in Conwy, Wales

Roman Bridge Welsh: Pont Rhufeinig
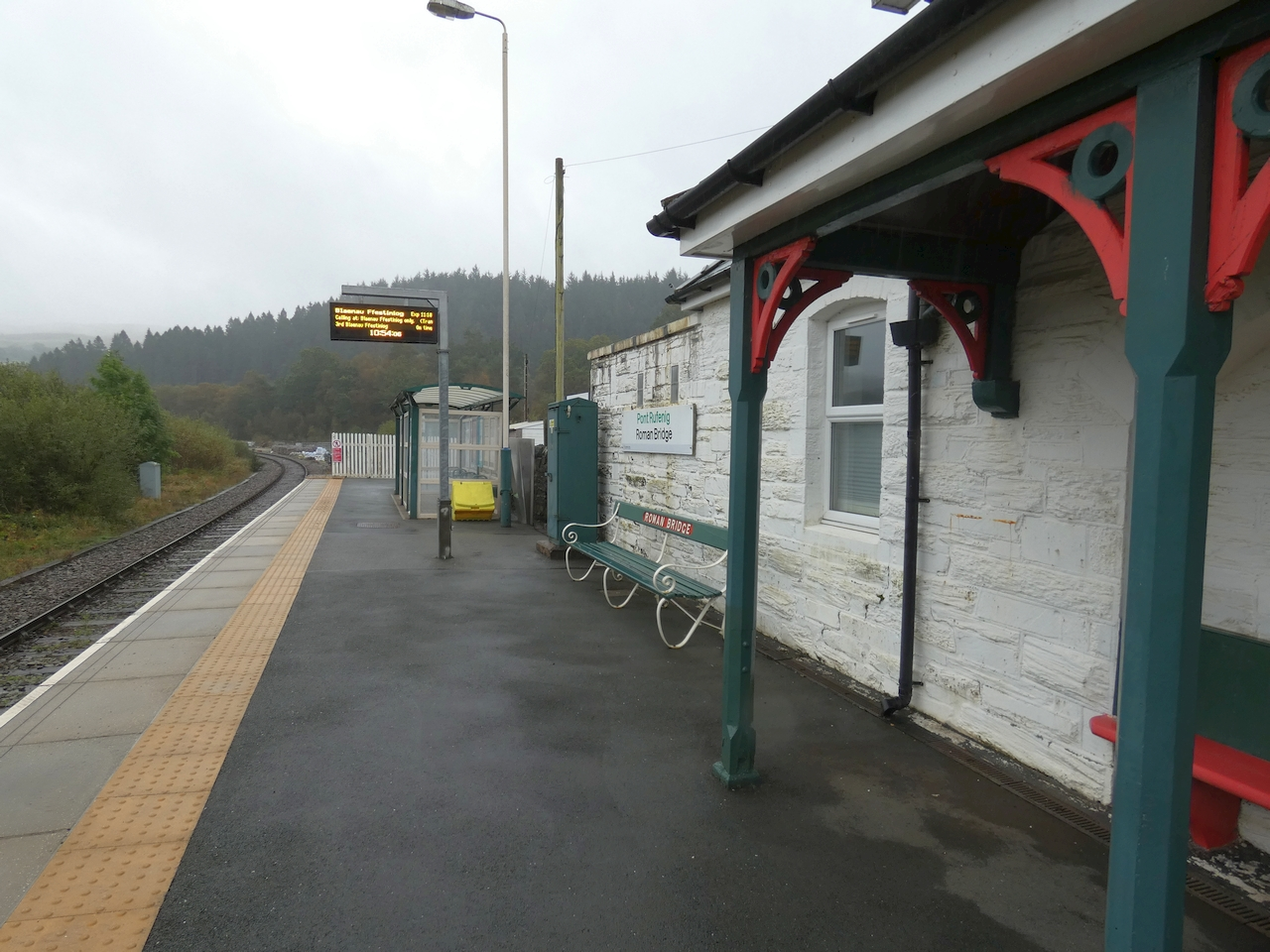
- Roman Bridge station in October 2019

General information
- Location: Lledr Valley, Conwy; Wales
- Coordinates: 53.0443°N 3.9214°W
- Grid reference: SH712514
- Manager: Transport for Wales Rail
- Platforms: 1

Other information
- Station code: RMB
- Classification: DfT category F2

History
- Original company: London and North Western Railway
- Pre-grouping: London and North Western Railway

Key dates
- 22 July 1879: Opened

Passengers
- 2021/22: ▲472
- 2022/23: ▼450
- 2023/24: ▲680
- 2024/25: ▼612
- 2025/26: ▲676
Location
Notes
- Passenger statistics from the Office of Rail and Road

Roman Bridge railway station (Welsh: Pont Rhufeinig) is a railway station in the Lledr Valley, Wales, on the Conwy Valley Line. It is 22 miles 48 chains (36.4 km) from Llandudno Junction, and is between Dolwyddelan and Blaenau Ffestiniog. The station and the services calling at the station are operated by Transport for Wales Rail.

It is named after a nearby ancient bridge over the River Lledr, that carries a minor highway from the A470 road to scattered hill farms at Blaenau Dolwyddelan.

== History ==
The station was opened on 22 July 1879 when the London and North Western Railway opened an extension of the Conwy Valley line from Betws-y-Coed to Blaenau Ffestiniog. Early Baedeker guide books to Great Britain state that there is no explanation for the name, though the Roman road Sarn Helen is known to have passed down the valley on its way from Canovium (in the Conwy Valley) to Tomen y Mur, at Trawsfynydd making a crossing at this point feasible.

The station had a goods yard, which in 1939 received grain, flour, manure and other items. However, the yard was removed in the 1950s.

The station was host to two LMS caravans from 1935 to 1939, and a camping coach was also positioned here by the London Midland Region from 1954 to 1956.

The station building still stands and is well maintained as a residence - it was offered for sale in 2013 for £450,000 as a private home (with 10 acres of land), after previous use as a holiday cottage.

The station signs erroneously give the Welsh name as Pont Rufenig.

== Facilities ==
The unstaffed station has digital CIS screens. There is a waiting shelter, pay phone and timetable poster board for train running information provision. As there are no facilities to purchase tickets, passengers must buy one in advance, or from the guard on the train.

== Passenger volume ==
For the year April 2023 to March 2024, it was the least used station in Wales, with 680 entries and exits.

Passenger volume at Roman Bridge
	2004–05	2005–06	2006–07	2007–08	2008–09	2009–10	2010–11	2011–12	2012–13	2013–14	2014–15	2015–16	2016–17	2017–18	2018–19	2019–20	2020–21	2021–22	2022–23	2023–24	2024–25
Entries and exits	230	310	307	377	388	610	636	780	842	764	746	544	744	942	1,094	720	64	472	450	680	612

The statistics cover twelve month periods that start in April.

== Services ==
Five southbound and six northbound trains call on request Mondays to Saturdays (approximately every three hours), with three trains each way on Sundays between May and early September.

Services were temporarily suspended in February 2020 and replaced by road transport due to flooding of the line north of Llanrwst caused by Storm Ciara. Following completion of the work to repair the storm damage, services at the station were reinstated on 28 September 2020.

Preceding station	National Rail	Following station
Dolwyddelan	Transport for Wales Conwy Valley Line	Blaenau Ffestiniog

== Bibliography ==
- Mitchell, Vic; Smith, Keith (2010). Bala to Llandudno. West Sussex: Middleton Press. figs. 70-71. ISBN 9781906008871. OCLC 668198724.
- Wills, Dixe (2014). Tiny Stations (Paperback, 1st reprint ed.). Basingstoke: AA Publishing. ISBN 978-0-7495-7732-2.
