= Lledr Valley =

Valley in Snowdonia in north Wales

Coordinates: 53.06°N 3.87°W

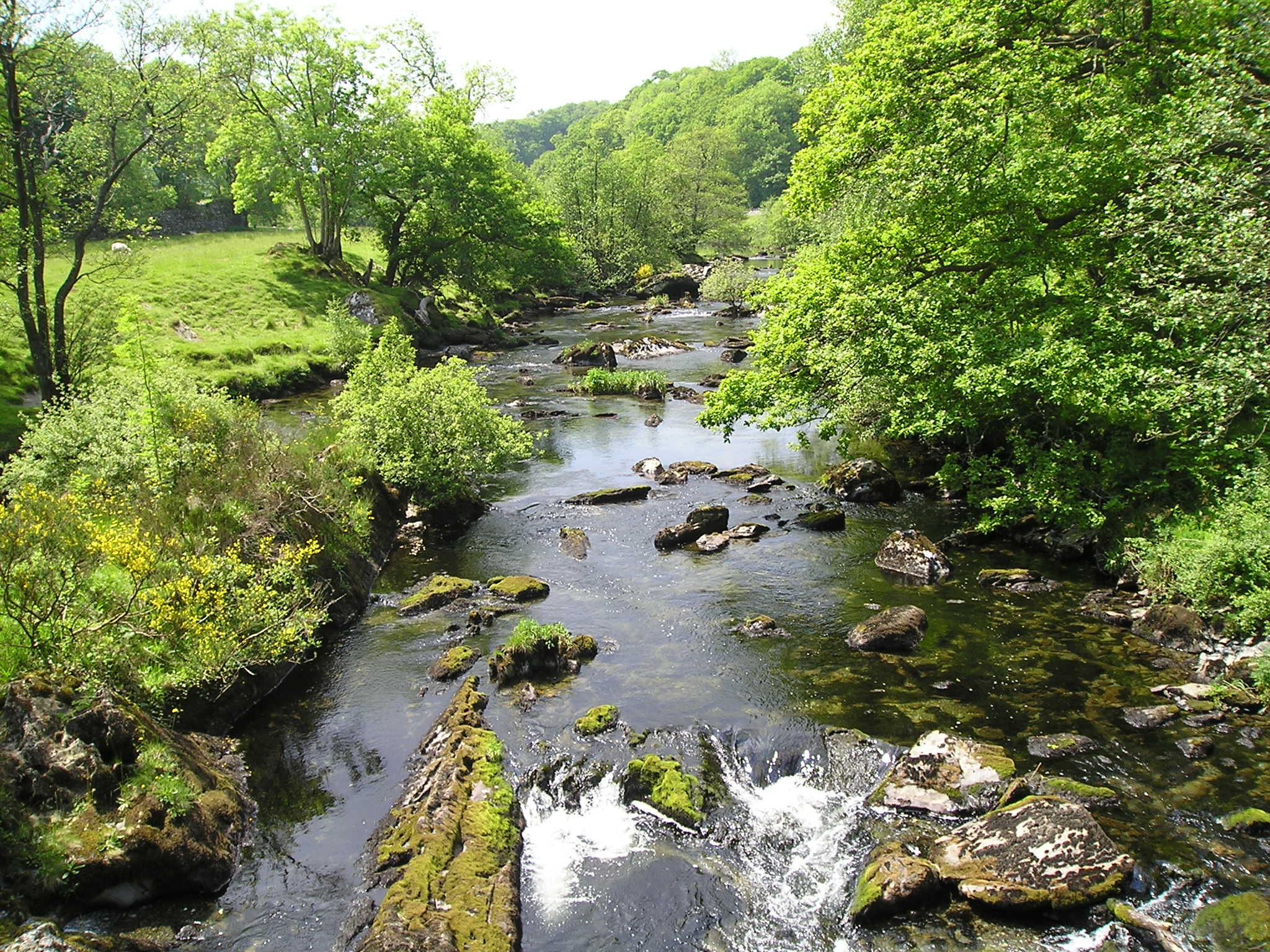
The Afon Lledr from the bridge at Pont-y-Pant

The Lledr Valley (Welsh: Dyffryn Lledr) is a valley in Snowdonia in north Wales. It runs from the top of the Crimea Pass, north of Blaenau Ffestiniog down to Betws-y-Coed.

The A470 road follows the line of the valley, as does the railway line from Blaenau Ffestiniog to Llandudno, and within the valley there are stations at Roman Bridge, Dolwyddelan, and Pont-y-Pant.

Dolwyddelan is the main settlement in the valley.

The river Lledr, which gives its name to the valley, joins the River Conwy to the south of Betws-y-Coed.

== Industry ==
During the Victorian period the valley was renowned for its slate quarries, which were concentrated around Dolwyddelan. These quarries worked the Nod Glas Formation, which extended across Mid and North Wales. It was primarily a bed of soft, black shale, but in the area of the Dolwyddelan syncline it was partially metamorphised into slate. The principle quarries in the valley were:

- Prince Llewellyn quarry and Chwarel Fedw
- Chwarel Ddu
- Ty'n-y-bryn quarry and Penllyn
- Rhiw-goch quarry
