= Ty'n-y-bryn quarry =

Disused slate quarry in north Wales

Ty'n-y-bryn
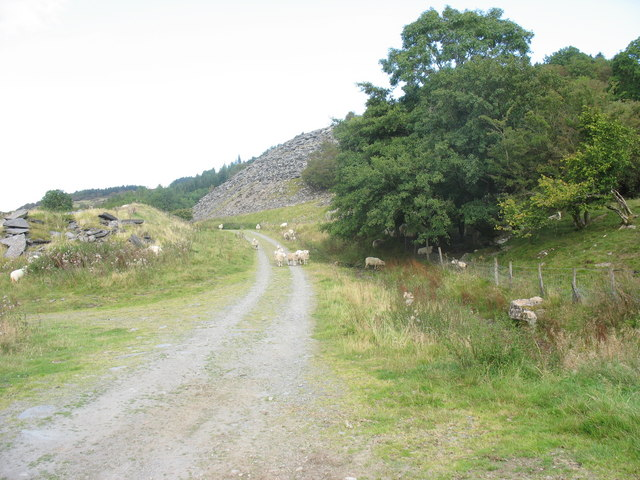
- The lower slate tips of Ty'n-y-bryn quarry

- Location in Conwy
- Location: near Dolwyddelan, Carnarvonshire (now Conwy County Borough), Wales, UK; 53.051124°N 3.877559°W SH 742 521
- Products: Slate
- Type: Quarry
- Opened: 1840s
- Active: 1840s–?; 1861–1914; 1920–1924
- Closed: 1924

Ty'n-y-bryn quarry (also known as Bwlch y Llan quarry or Lledr Vale quarry) was a slate quarry that was worked from the 1840s to about 1914. It stands on the south-east edge of Dolwyddelan.

== History ==
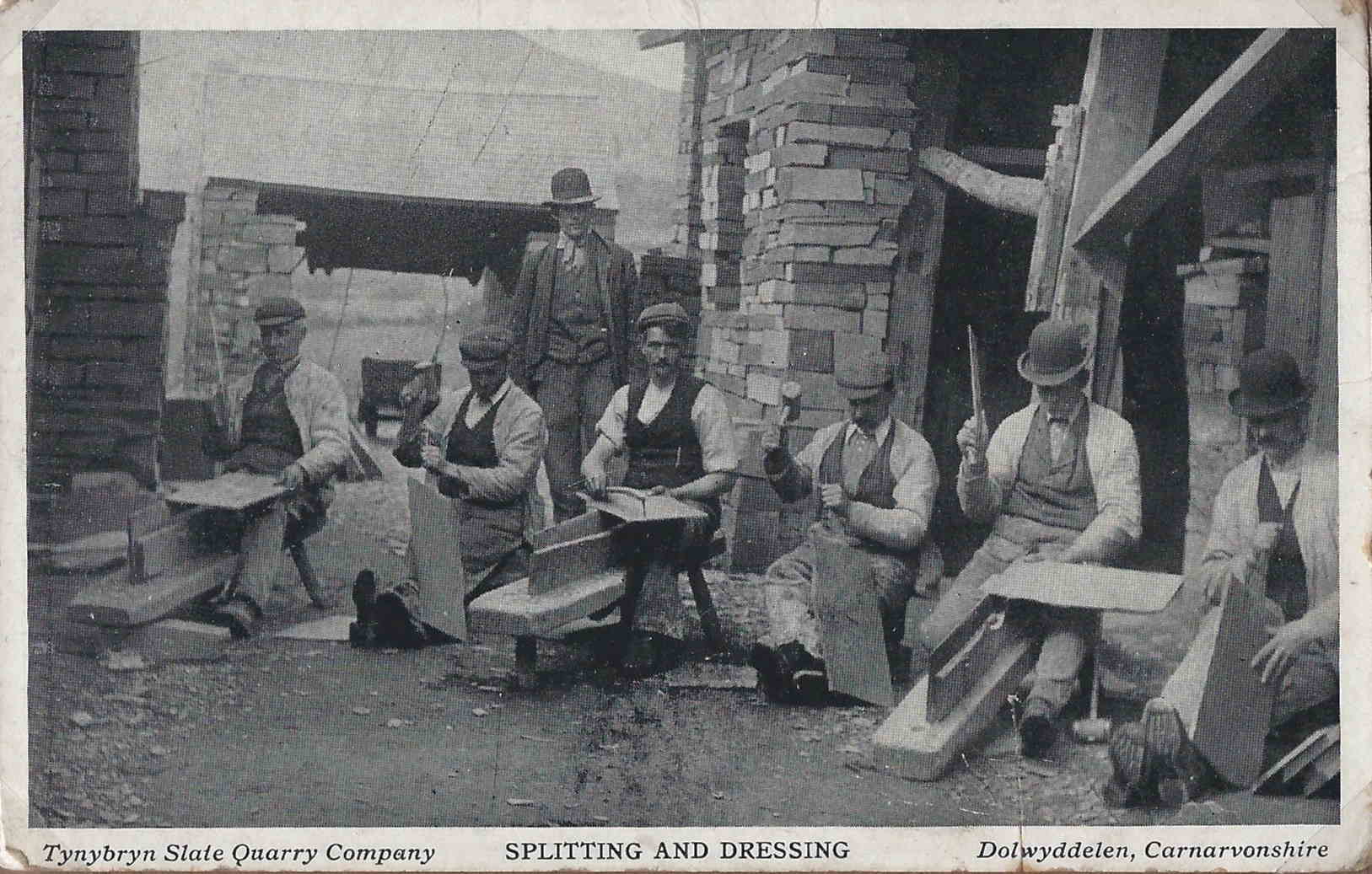
Quarrymen pose with their tools at Ty'n-y-bryn slate quarry

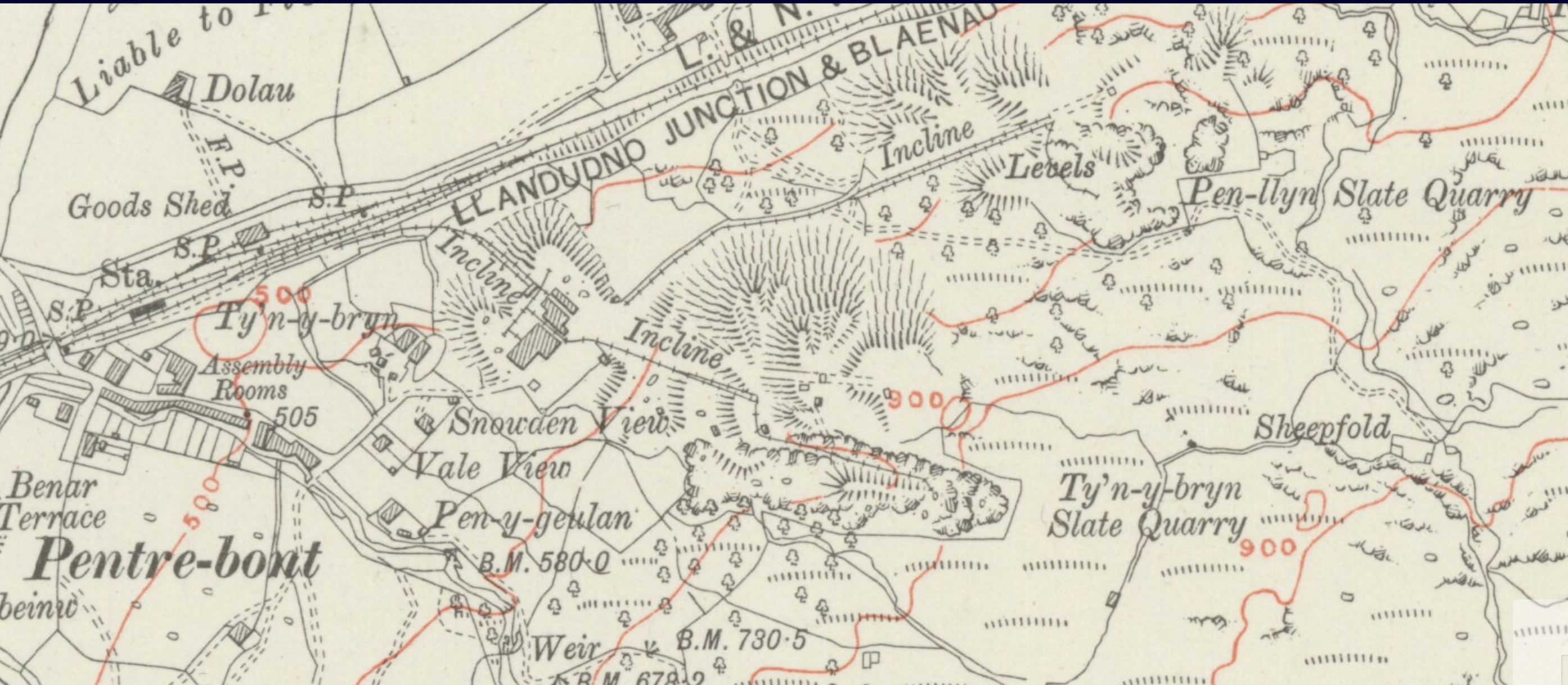
Map showing the Ty'n-y-bryn and Penllyn quarries and Dolwyddelan railway station in 1911

The original workings at Ty'n-y-bryn were started in the 1840s. In 1861, the quarry was restarted and a large mill was built just behind the Pentre-bont houses on the edge of Dolwyddelan. The mill had a large waterwheel which was fed from the Llyn Cwm-penamnen reservoir about 1 mile (1.6 km) to the south.

In 1875, the Penllyn quarry was taken over by the company. Penllyn had been worked on a small scale since at least 1873, and was immediately to the east of Ty'n-y-bryn. The Ty'n-y-bryn mill processed slate from both quarries. In 1879, an incline was built down from the mill level to exchange sidings at Dolwyddelan railway station. Unusually, the incline was laid as standard gauge, allowing wagons from the London and North Western Railway to be taken up to the mill. It was one of only four slate quarries in North Wales that had standard gauge railway laid directly to its mill.

Quarrying at the quarry ended in 1914. There was an attempt to restart Penllyn, again using the Ty'n-y-bryn mill, in 1920. This lasted until 1924, when all work ceased.

== Geology ==
The quarry worked slate from the Nod Glas Formation, which outcrops along the Lledr Valley. Through most of its length, the Nod Glas is black shale, but in the area around Dolwyddelan a syncline compressed the shales and it developed enough cleavage to be worked as slate.
