= Crimea Pass =

Mountain pass in North Wales

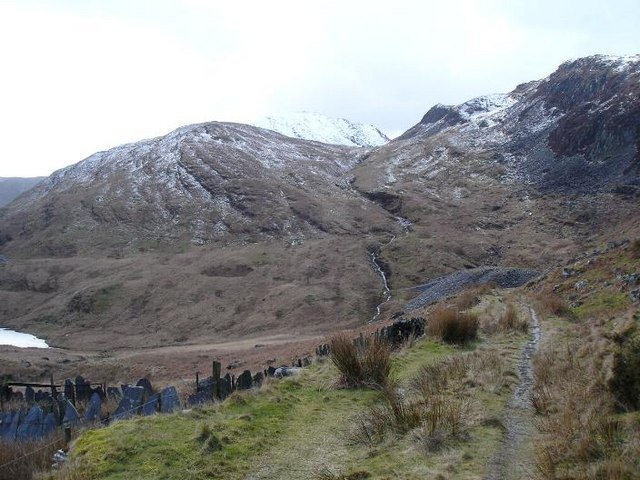
- The Pass in 2006
- Interactive map of Crimea Pass
- Elevation: 385 metres (1,263 ft)
- Traversed by: A470 road

Third Approach
- Location: North Wales
- Coordinates: 53.02338°N 3.93816°W

The Crimea Pass (Welsh: Bwlch y Gorddinan) is a mountain pass in North Wales, on the A470 road between Blaenau Ffestiniog and Dolwyddelan connecting the counties of Gwynedd and Conwy.

== Geography ==
At its highest point, it is 385 metres (1,263 ft) above sea level, and is sometimes closed in winter because of snow. At one time there was an inn at the summit of the pass, called the "Prince Llewellyn Inn" but it was popularly known as "the Crimea", because of its reputation for fights. The inn closed in 1881 because the police opposed the renewal of its licence and the justices thought that there was no need for the Inn when the railway to Ffestiniog was completed.

== Industry ==
In the mid-1870s, Owen Gethin Jones opened the Bwlch Gordduant quarry near the summit of the pass. The quarry was not a great success and it was sold to the owner of the Prince Llewellyn quarry in late 1876. There is a track above the road which follows the route of the old road across the pass, described as a cleverly constructed route with gradients appropriate for a time when horses were the source of power.

== Name ==
It takes its name from the Crimean War which was being fought about the time the road was opened, in 1854. The construction of the stone walls in the area was carried out by Russian prisoners of war captured at the battles of Inkerman and Balaclava.

== Recent development ==
In 2008 major highway improvement work on the A470 through the pass was completed, this included the downhill section to the north of the pass, and southwards down to Blaenau Ffestiniog.
