= Afon Lledr =

River in north-west Wales

Coordinates: 53°04′N 3°48′W

Afon Lledr River Lledr
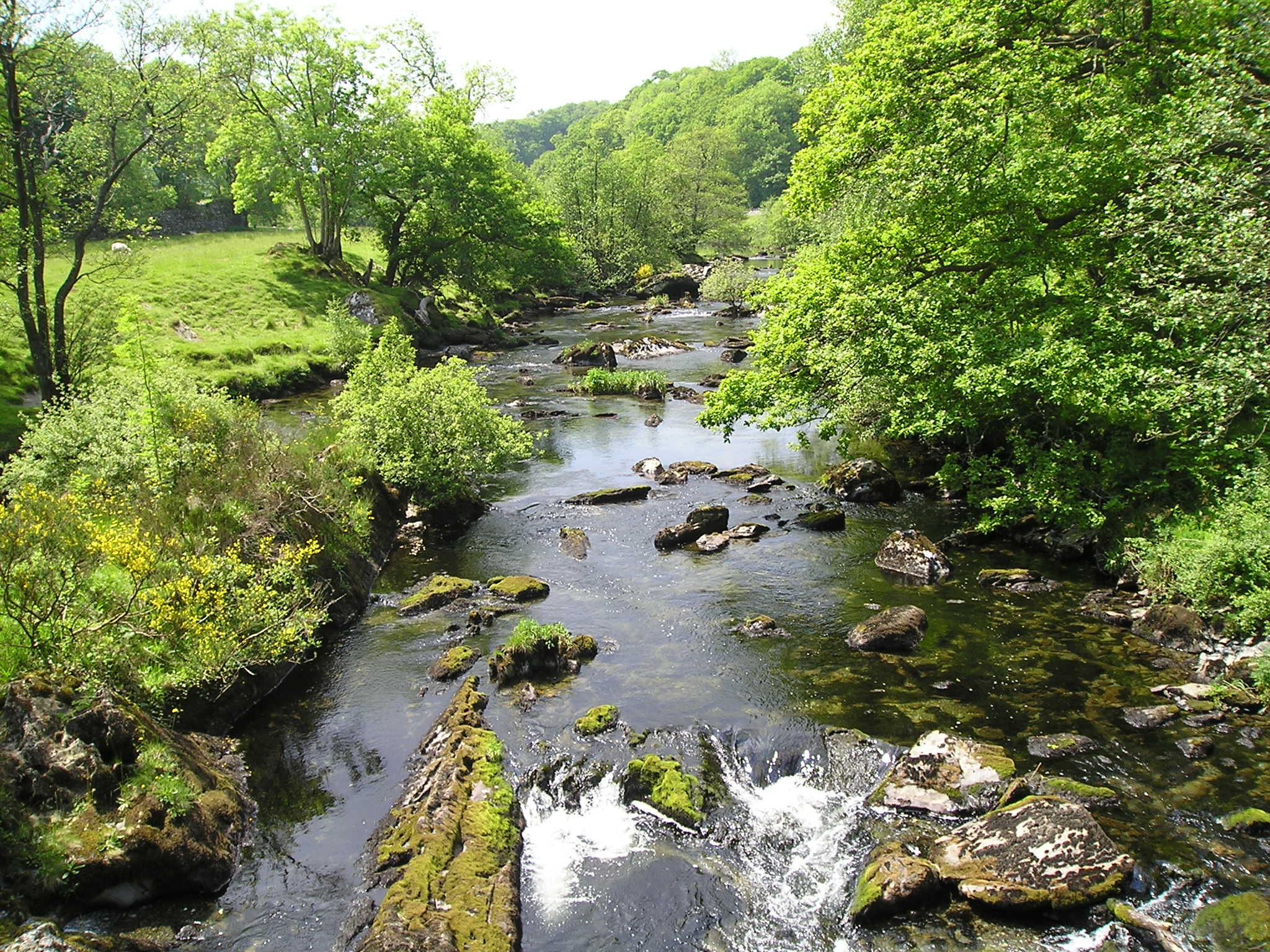
- Afon Lledr from the bridge at Pont-y-Pant

- Location of mouth

Location
- Country: Wales

Physical characteristics
- Source
  - location: the eastern slopes of Ysgafell Wen, which lies about 3 km NE of Cnicht
- Mouth
  - location: confluence with River Conwy
- Length: 16 km (9.9 mi)

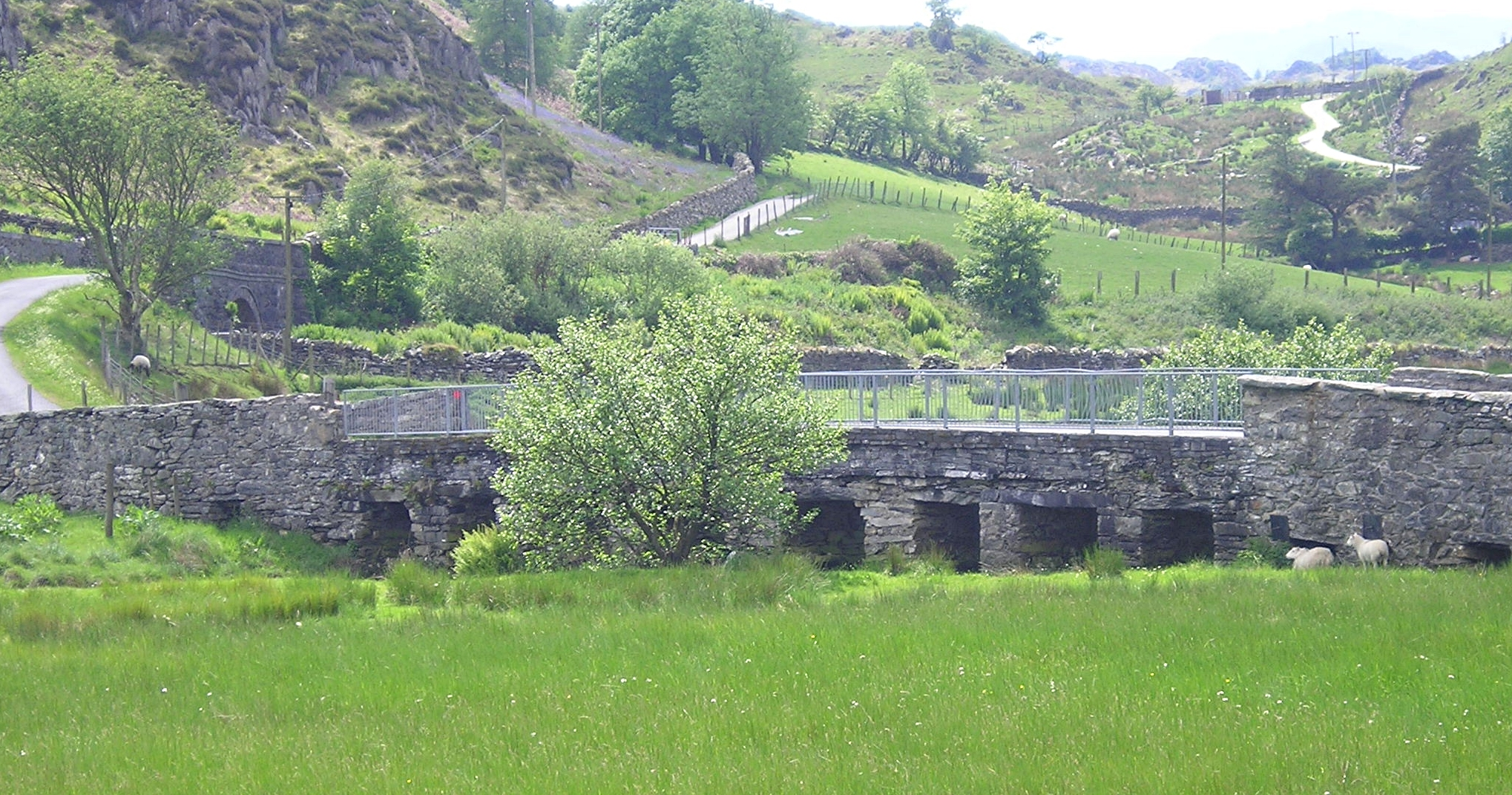
The ancient Pont Rufeinig across the upper Afon Lledr

Afon Lledr (Welsh for 'River Lledr') is a river in north-west Wales and the second major tributary of the River Conwy. It is about 10 miles or 16 km long, and flows in a generally easterly direction.

The Lledr has its source on the eastern slopes of Ysgafell Wen, which lies about 3 km NE of Cnicht. It initially flows in a north-easterly direction towards Blaenau Dolwyddelan, where Ceunant Ty'n y Ddol joins it, then flows under the Roman Bridge (Welsh: Pont-y-Sarn-Ddu) and past Dolwyddelan, where Afon Penamnen joins it. It continues to the north-east past Pont-y-Pant and then east along the Lledr Valley, running parallel to the A470 and the railway line from Blaenau Ffestiniog to Llandudno. This line has stations in the Lledr Valley at Roman Bridge, Dolwyddelan, and Pont-y-Pant. The river joins the River Conwy to the south of Betws-y-Coed.

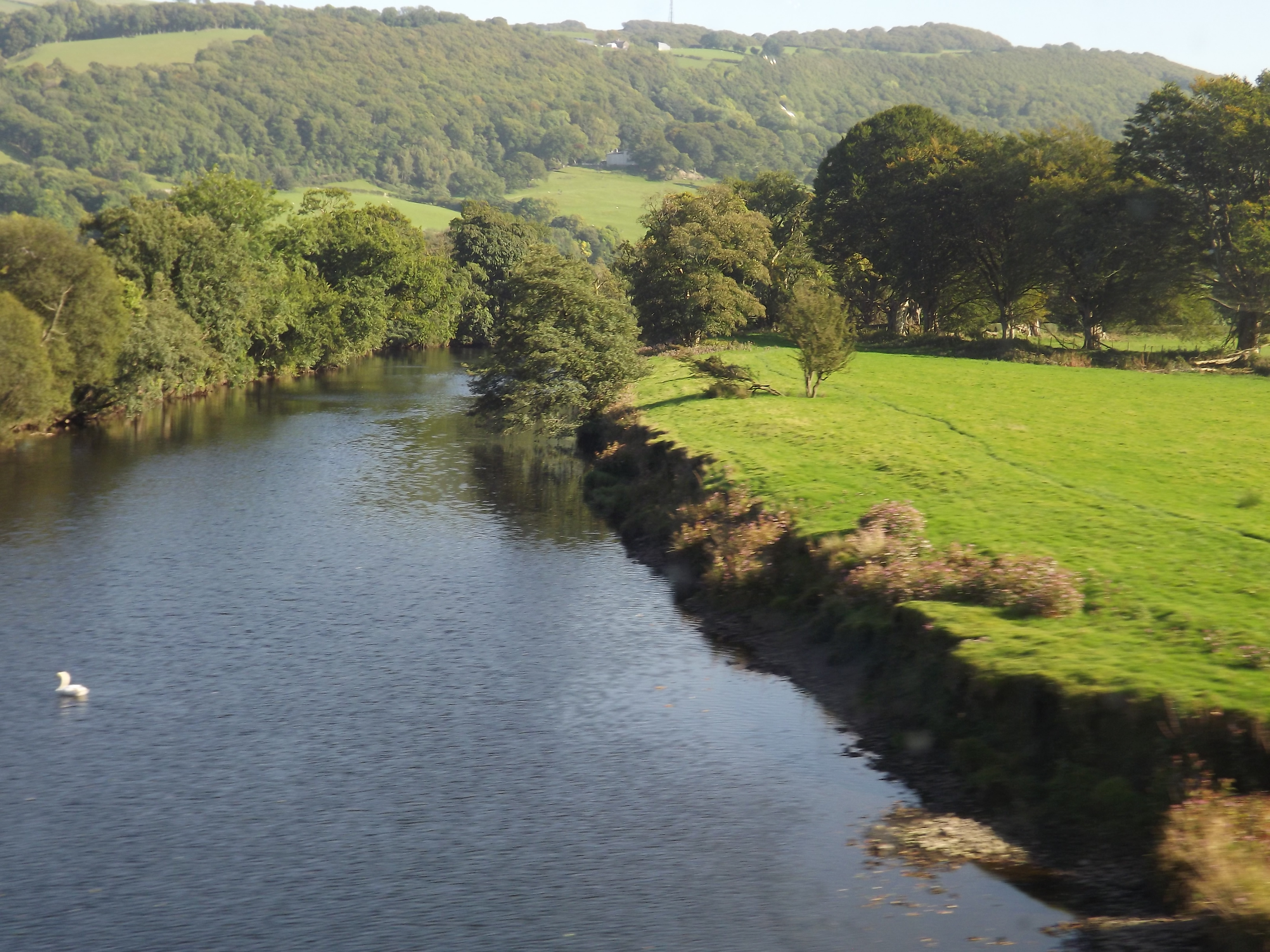
Taken on a moving train
