= Pentre Bont =

Village in Conwy County Borough, Wales

Coordinates: 53.051185°N 3.881848°W

- Location within Conwy
- OS grid reference: SH 7396 5209
- Community: Dolwyddelan
- Principal area: Conwy
- Country: Wales
- Sovereign state: United Kingdom
- Police: North Wales
- Fire: North Wales
- Ambulance: Welsh
- UK Parliament: Bangor Aberconwy

Pentre Bont is a small village in the Dolwyddelan community, in the historic county of Caernarfonshire and county borough of Conwy.

== See also ==
- List of localities in Wales by population
