= Conwy Valley Railway Museum =

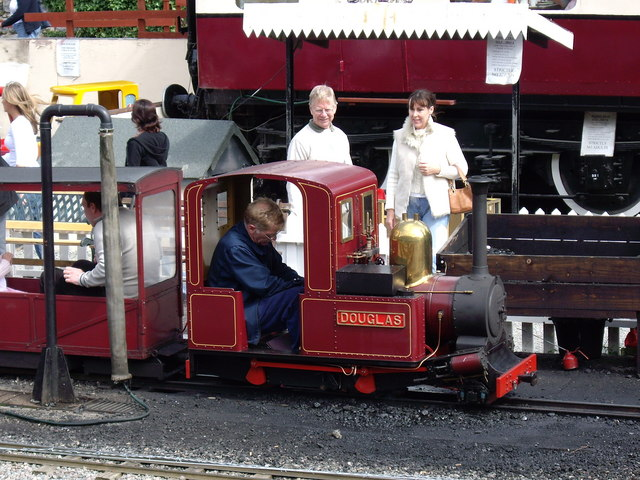
- The miniature steam railway

- Location within Conwy County Borough
- Established: 1970s
- Location: Betws-y-Coed, Conwy County Borough, Wales
- Coordinates: 53.092903°N 3.800207°W
- Type: Railway museum
- Founder: Alan Pratt
- Owner: Colin Cartwright
- Website: Conwy Valley Railway Museum

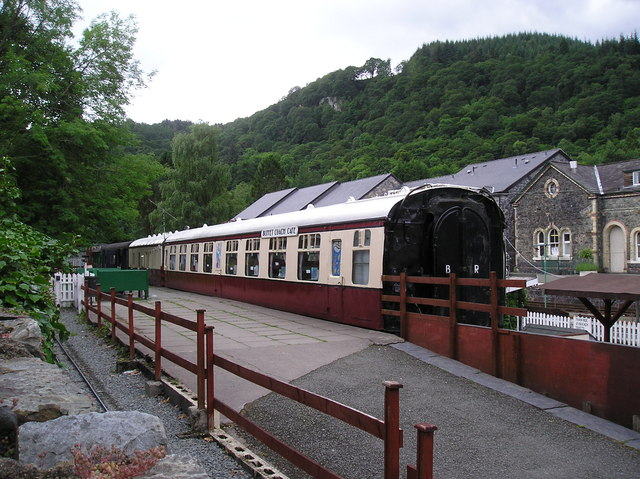
The buffet coach

The Conwy Valley Railway Museum (Welsh: Amgueddfa Rheilffordd Dyffryn Conwy) is located at Betws-y-Coed railway station, Betws-y-Coed, North Wales, on the site of the old railway goods yard.

== Museum ==
The museum was founded starting with a former standard gauge railway carriage which today acts as a licensed buffet and restaurant car. The current museum was built later, and contains various railway artefacts.

== Miniature railway ==
Other attractions include a 7 1/4 in (184 mm) gauge miniature steam railway which runs for 1-mile (1.6 km) on the site. The railway is a single track running around the perimeter of the site. It is curved round 180 degrees at the South of the site with a balloon loop at each end which are superimposed at the North of the site. Use of several spring points allow trains to complete a circuit without manual adjustment of any points. Passing loops allow more than one train to use the circuit simultaneously.

== Tramway ==
There is also a one-third full-size (1:3) electric tramcar which runs for a 0.5-mile (805 m) on the site, on track of 15 in (381 mm) gauge. This is one of only two electric tramways in Wales (the other being a short 18 in (457 mm) gauge electric tramway in Heath Park, Cardiff, owned by Cardiff Model Engineering Society).

== See also ==
- British narrow gauge railways
- Conwy Valley Line
- List of British railway museums
- Miniature Railways
