= Maredudd ab Ieuan ap Robert =

Welsh landed gentleman (1465?–1525)

Maredudd ab Ieuan ab Robert (born around 1465, died 1525), also spelt Maredudd ap Ieuan and Maredudd ab Ifan, was a Welsh landed gentleman and succeeded his father Ieuan ap Robert ap Maredudd (1437–1468). He had two full brothers, Robert and John, and three half-siblings born of his father Ieuan ap Robert's second marriage to Gwenhwyfar ferch Madog Vaughan of Llwyn Dyrus, they being Gruffudd Vaughan, Ieuan and an unnamed sister. He purchased and rebuilt Gwydyr Castle after it was destroyed in the 1460s and made it the family home. He was an ancestor of Sir John Wynn, 1st Baronet.

To avoid implication in the feuds of his kinsmen in Eifionydd, Maredudd purchased the lease of Dolwyddelan Castle about 1489. He later built Penamnen. He finally purchased Gwydyr from Dafydd ap Hywel Coetmor about 1500.

He married three times and had multiple natural children by various mistresses. He married firstly Alice, the natural daughter of Gwilym ap Gruffudd ap Robin of Cochwillan, with whom he had four sons – John Wyn ap Maredudd, who succeeded him, Rhys Wyn, William Wyn and Rhydderch – and six daughters.

He married secondly Gwenhwyfar, daughter of Gruffudd ap Hywel y Farf, by whom he had a daughter, Elsbeth. He married thirdly Margaret, daughter of Morus ap John, by whom he had two sons – Humphry Wyn and Cadwaladr – and seven daughters.

In total he is said to have had 26 children.
