= Prince Llewellyn quarry =

Disused slate quarry in north Wales

Prince Llewellyn
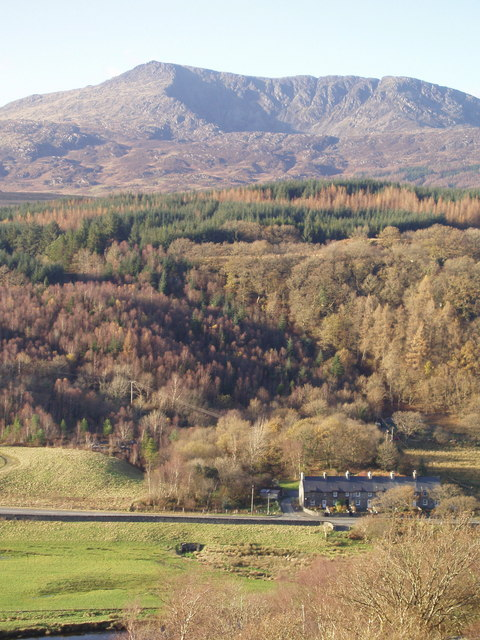
- Prince Llewelyn Terrace, the site of the quarry is behind and to the left of the houses

- Location in Conwy
- Location: near Dolwyddelan, Carnarvonshire (now Conwy County Borough), Wales, UK; 53.058658°N 3.875230°W SH 743 529
- Products: Slate
- Type: Quarry
- Opened: c. 1820
- Active: c.1820–1917; 1918–1934
- Closed: 1934

The Prince Llewellyn quarry (also known as Bwlch Cynnud quarry, Y Foel quarry, Hendre Ddu quarry, or Prince Llywelyn quarry) was a slate quarry that stands on the west side of the Lledr Valley, ENE of Dolwyddelan. It was worked from around 1820 to 1934.

== History ==
=== Early years ===
The quarry opened around 1820, and was originally an open pit. The quarry was expanded in the 1840s. The road from Betws-y-Coed to Dolwyddelan was re-routed in 1846 to allow construction of a new quarry mill and Prince Llewelyn Terrace to house quarry workers. The new mill contained four horizontal sandsaws driven by a steam engine, which was later replaced with a 30 feet (9.1 m) waterwheel. An incline led down from the pit to the mill level.

=== Chwarel Fedw ===
In 1873, the quarry was owned by John Jones and employed about 40 men. The quarry was worked in conjunction with Chwarel Fedw on the east side of the valley. A tramway was built across the Afon Lledr to connect the two quarries and slate from Chwarel Fedw was taken across to the second mill for processing.

=== Expansion, decline and recovery ===
In 1877, 120 men were employed at Prince Llewellyn and the owner, George Raynes was looking to expand, and he purchased the Bwlch Gordduant quarry from Owen Gethin Jones. 1878 saw a collapse in the slate market and nearly all of the workers at Prince Llewwllyn were laid off in December of that year. Chwarel Fedw had closed and the tramway had been lifted by 1887.

In 1882, the quarry employed 74 workers and produced 1685 tons of finished slate under the ownership of George de Wolfe and Fisher Jones. In the 1890s, a second mill was added, driven by a water turbine. This larger structure contain six sandsaws, six slate dressing machines and three planers. There was some underground working in later years.

In August 1896, there was a serious accident at the quarry. Mill worker Thomas Morris was pulled into one of the slate working machines when his clothes got caught in the drive strap. His legs were crushed. He died of his injuries, and the quarry company was fined £7 16s (equivalent of £672 in 2018).

=== Decline, closure and final attempts ===
1898 was the peak of production in the Welsh slate industry. After the turn of the century, the Great Strike at Penrhyn gave smaller quarries a boost, but once the strike ended in late 1903, the rest of the industry suffered. In 1907, the company was sued by R.O. Jones & Davies, their solicitors. The company did not appear at Llanrwst County Court and a judgement of £28 0s 4d (equivalent of £2234 in 2018) was made against them.

In 1909, the company was back in court after it failed to pay wages owed to its workers, and in December it was ordered to make good the missing money. It declared bankruptcy less than 11 months later in 1910. Despite this, limited work continued at the quarry, but it closed in 1917 following the outbreak of the First World War.

Prince Llewellyn re-opened after the war and operated until 1934, and is thought to be the last mill to have used sandsaws in the Welsh slate industry.

=== After closure ===
In 2015, the quarry gained notoriety when David Craig Ellis killed Alec Warburton and dumped his body into the flooded pit of the quarry. Ellis was convicted of murder in 2016 and sentenced to 26 years in prison.

== Geology ==
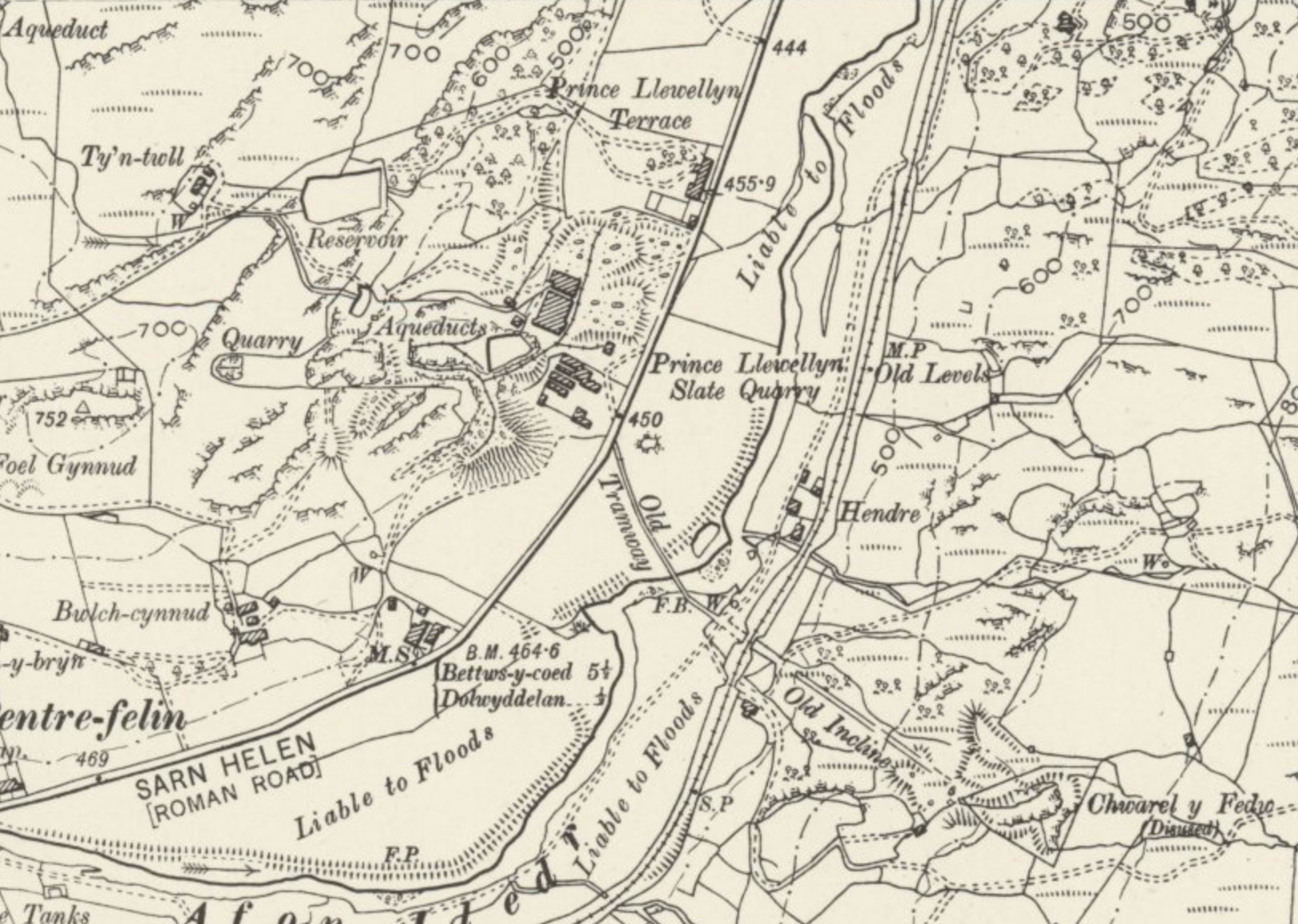
Extract of the 1899 Ordnance Survey map, showing Prince Llewellyn and Chwarel Fedw quarries

The quarry worked slate from the Nod Glas Formation which outcrops along the Conwy Valley. Through most of its length, the Nod Glas is black shale, but in the area around Dolwyddelan a syncline compressed the shales and it developed enough cleavage to be worked as slate.
