= Chwarel Ddu quarry =

Disused slate quarry in north Wales

Chwarel Ddu
- Location in Conwy

Location
- Location: near Dolwyddelan, Carnarvonshire (now Conwy County Borough), Wales, UK; 53.051163°N 3.909534°W SH 720 522

Production
- Products: Slate
- Type: Quarry

History
- Opened: c.1800–1805
- Active: c.1805–1888 (sporadically); 1920s–c.1929
- Closed: 1920s

Chwarel Ddu quarry was the earliest slate quarry in the Lledr Valley. It was working before 1810, and continued in sporadic operation until the late 1920s. It is about 0.5 miles (0.80 km) west of Dolwyddelan, just beneath Dolwyddelan Castle.

== History ==
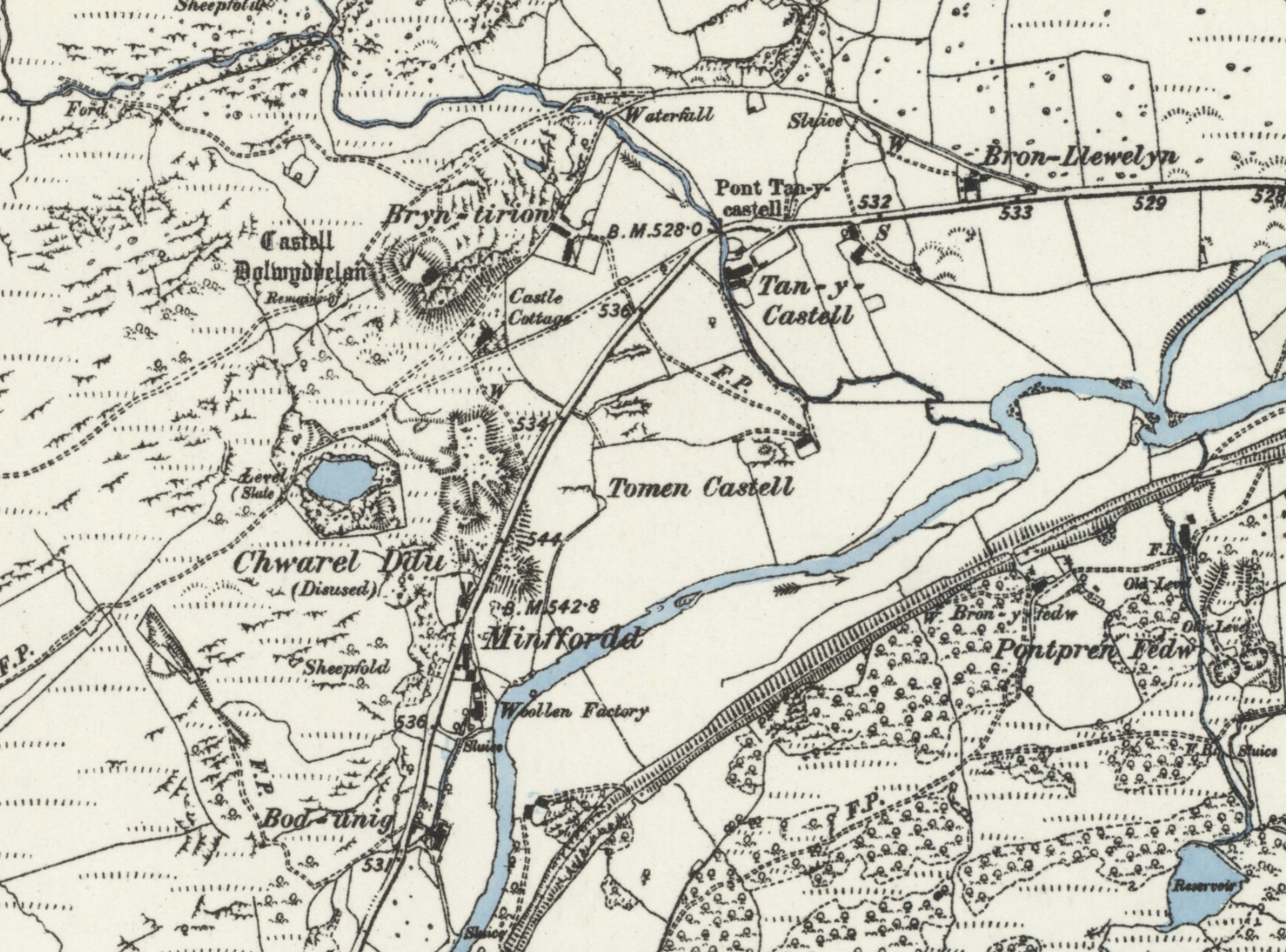
An extract of the 1888 Ordnance Survey map showing Dolwyddelan Castle and Chwarel Ddu

The quarry is believed to have opened between 1800 and 1805. In 1810, the quarry was successful enough that the Gwydir Estate, who owned the land on which the quarry sat, constructed a cart road from the quarry to the Holyhead Road at Conwy. This now forms part of the A470. Despite this early success, the quarry only operated for short periods over the next few decade. For several years in the late 1850s, it produced significant amounts of slate, up to 700 tones per year. At this time a stationary steam engine was used to haul rock up from the open pit. By 1888 it was once more closed.

There was an attempt to re-open the quarry during the 1920s, and an oil engine was installed to replace the steam engine. A small number of quarrymen were employed, but the quarry had shut again by the end of the decade.

Like several other early slate quarries, Chwarel Ddu had an internal tramway using wooden rails with iron strapping on their surface. Several of the iron running surfaces were discovered in the 1980s when the quarry site was being levelled to make way for road improvements.

== Geology ==
The quarry worked slate from the Nod Glas Formation which outcrops along the Conwy Valley. Through most of its length, the Nod Glas is black shale, but in the area around Dolwyddelan a syncline compressed the shales and it developed enough cleavage to be worked as slate.
