= Pont-y-Pant railway station =

Railway station in Conwy, Wales

Pont-y-Pant
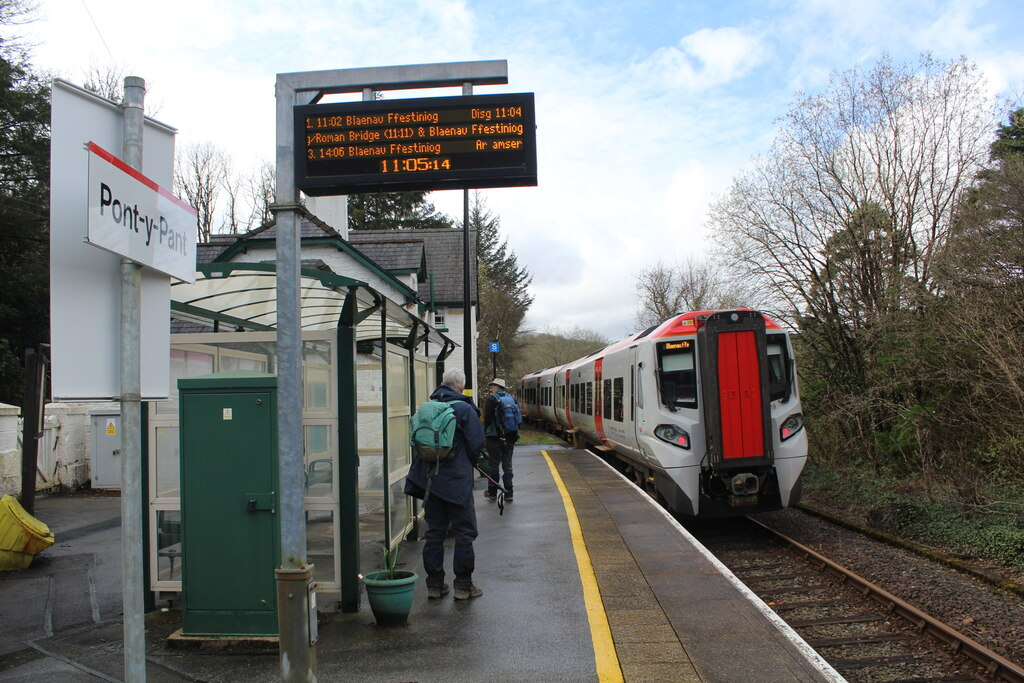

General information
- Location: Lledr Valley, Conwy; Wales
- Coordinates: 53.065°N 3.863°W
- Grid reference: SH752536
- Manager: Transport for Wales Rail
- Platforms: 1

Other information
- Station code: PYP
- Classification: DfT category F2

History
- Original company: London and North Western Railway
- Pre-grouping: London and North Western Railway

Key dates
- 22 July 1879: Opened

Passengers
- 2021/22: ▲574
- 2022/23: ▲776
- 2023/24: ▲814
- 2024/25: ▲994
- 2025/26: ▲1,038
Location
Notes
- Passenger statistics from the Office of Rail and Road

Pont-y-Pant railway station is a single platform passenger station in the Lledr Valley, Wales, on the Conwy Valley line from Llandudno Junction to Blaenau Ffestiniog, which is operated by Transport for Wales Rail. The station house is well maintained and used as a private dwelling.

== History ==
The station was opened on 22 July 1879 when the London and North Western Railway opened an extension of the Conwy Valley line from Betws-y-Coed to Blaenau Ffestiniog.

The station was the loading point for slate from the Rhiw-goch quarry on the opposite side of the valley. The slate was brought across the river by carts which crossed a substantially built bridge. The bridge is not shown on the 1888 OS Six-inch map but it is on the 1901 edition. Both maps show sidings to the north of the station on the eastern side of the line.

The station was host to a LMS caravan from 1934 to 1936, followed by two caravans from 1937 to 1939. A camping coach was also positioned here by the London Midland Region in 1954.

== Location ==
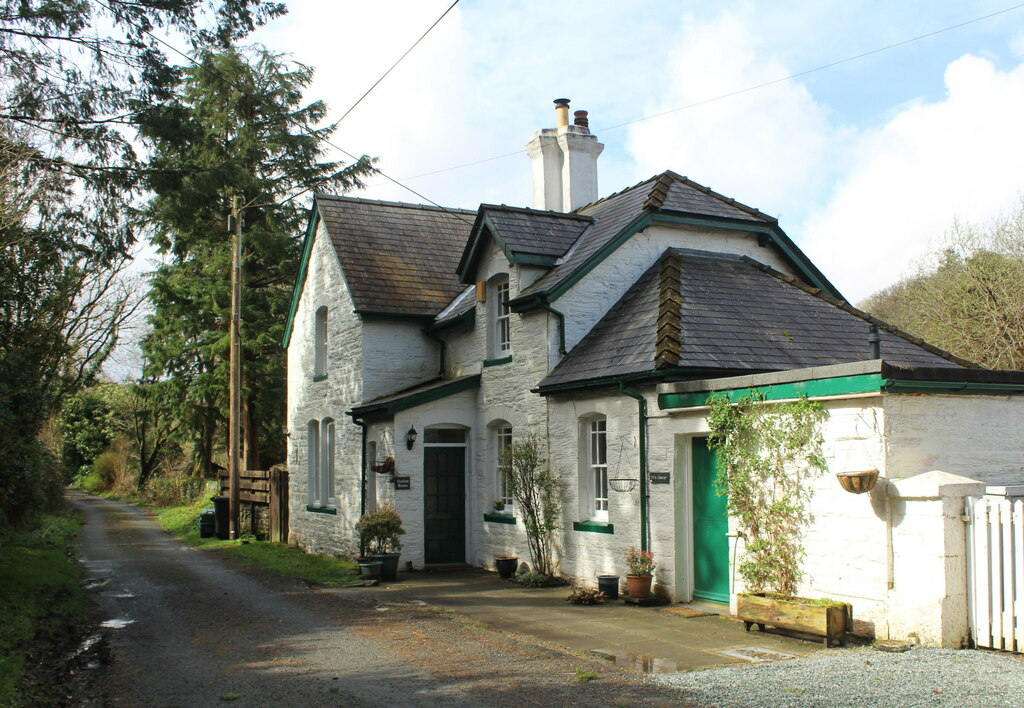
The station house in April 2024

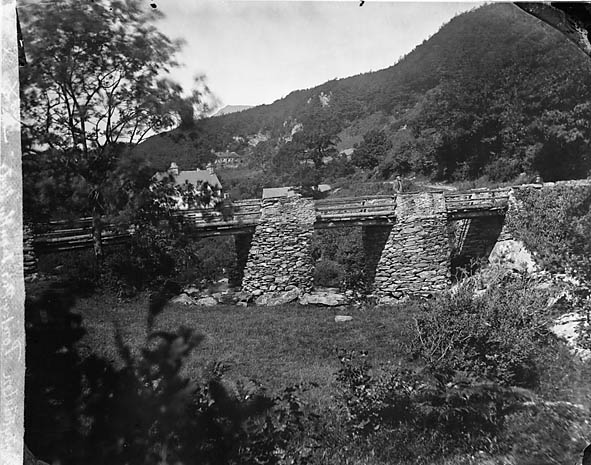
The bridge across the Afon Lledr connecting the station to Rhiw-goch quarry

The station, which is operated as an unstaffed halt and as a request stop, is across the River Lledr from the A470 main road and the bridge is a quarter of a mile to the north of the station.

There is no local village but the station serves a number of nearby isolated properties, and is also useful to walkers, owing to its proximity to a surviving section of the Sarn Helen Roman road.

== Services ==
Five southbound and six northbound trains call on request Mondays to Saturdays (approximately every three hours), with four trains each way on Sundays.

From 16 March 2019 however, the service was suspended and replaced by buses due to major flood damage in the Llanrwst area caused by Storm Gareth. The line remained closed for several months whilst repairs were carried out. Services resumed on 24 July 2019. Further storm damage to the north (this time from Storm Ciara) in February 2020 once again saw services suspended, with buses replacing trains from here until the line reopened again on 28 September 2020.

Preceding station	National Rail	Following station
Betws-y-Coed	Transport for Wales Rail; Conwy Valley Line	Dolwyddelan
