= Betws-y-Coed railway station =

Railway station in Conwy, Wales

Betws-y-coed
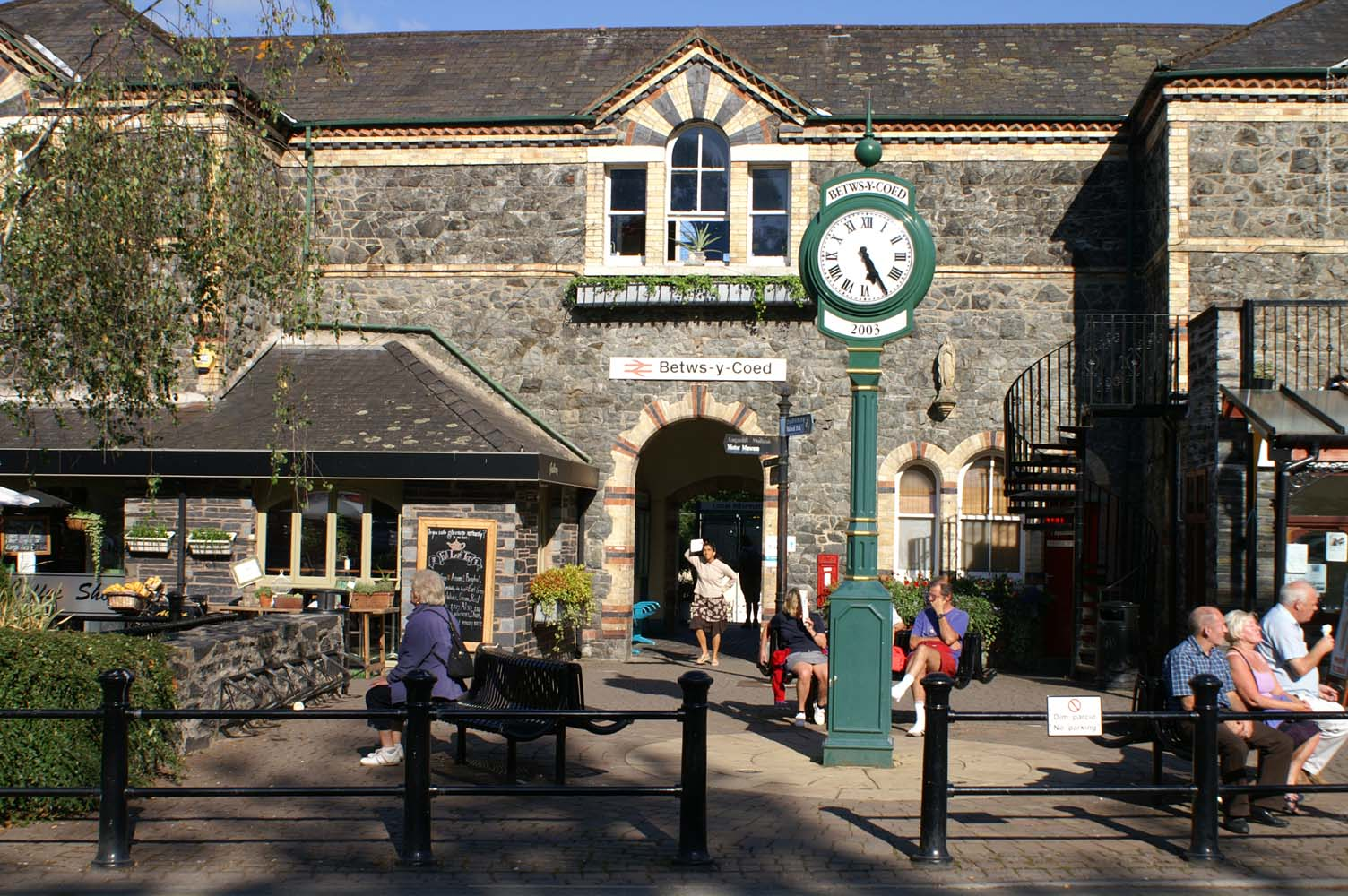
- The station entrance in August 2006.

General information
- Location: Betws-y-coed, Conwy; Wales
- Coordinates: 53.092°N 3.801°W
- Grid reference: SH795565
- Manager: Transport for Wales Rail
- Platforms: 1

Other information
- Station code: BYC
- Classification: DfT category F1

History
- Original company: London and North Western Railway

Key dates
- 6 April 1868: Opened as Bettws-y-Coed
- 8 June 1953: Renamed

Passengers
- 2021/22: ▲24,716
- 2022/23: ▲33,322
- 2023/24: ▲44,014
- 2024/25: ▲52,838
- 2025/26: ▲59,054
Location
Notes
- Passenger statistics from the Office of Rail and Road

Betws-y-coed railway station is on the Conwy Valley Line, which runs between Llandudno and Blaenau Ffestiniog. It is situated 15 1/2 miles (24.9 km) south of Llandudno Junction.

The passenger train service is operated by Transport for Wales Rail and is marketed as the Conwy Valley Railway (Welsh: Rheilffordd Dyffryn Conwy).

The railway station is also an important bus interchange. It is used by the Snowdonia National Park Sherpa bus services to Capel Curig, Pen-y-Gwryd, Pen-y-Pass, Beddgelert, Porthmadog, Tryfan and Bethesda. Other connecting bus services operate to Penmachno, Corwen, Llangollen, Llanrwst, Trefriw, Dolgarrog, Conwy and Llandudno. The local bus timetables advertise the train services and the Gwynedd Red Rover day ticket is valid on Conwy Valley trains as well as the Sherpa and Conwy Valley bus services. There is also a coach park at the station, which is used extensively by tourist coach operators.

== Station history ==
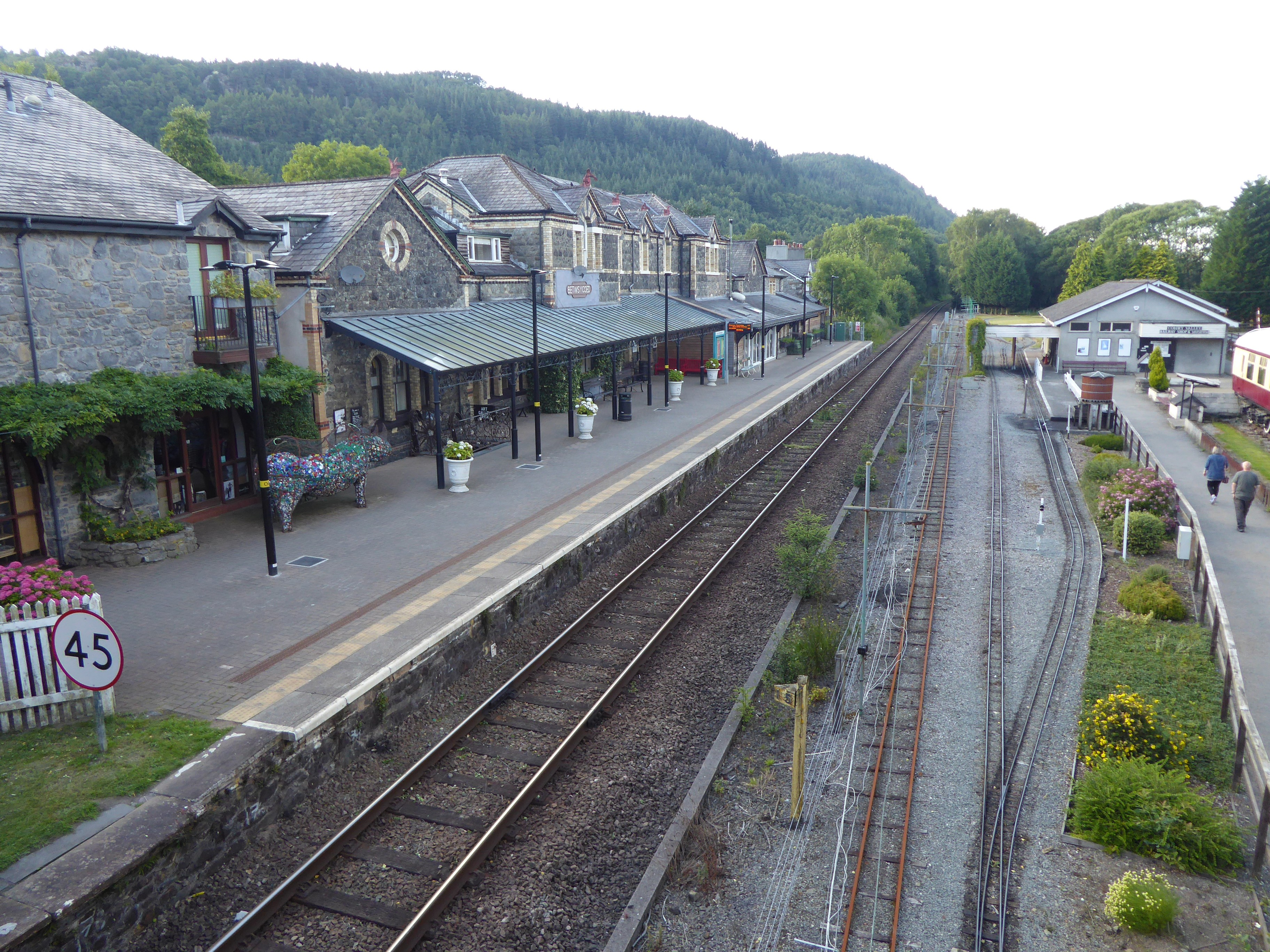
The station platform in July 2017.

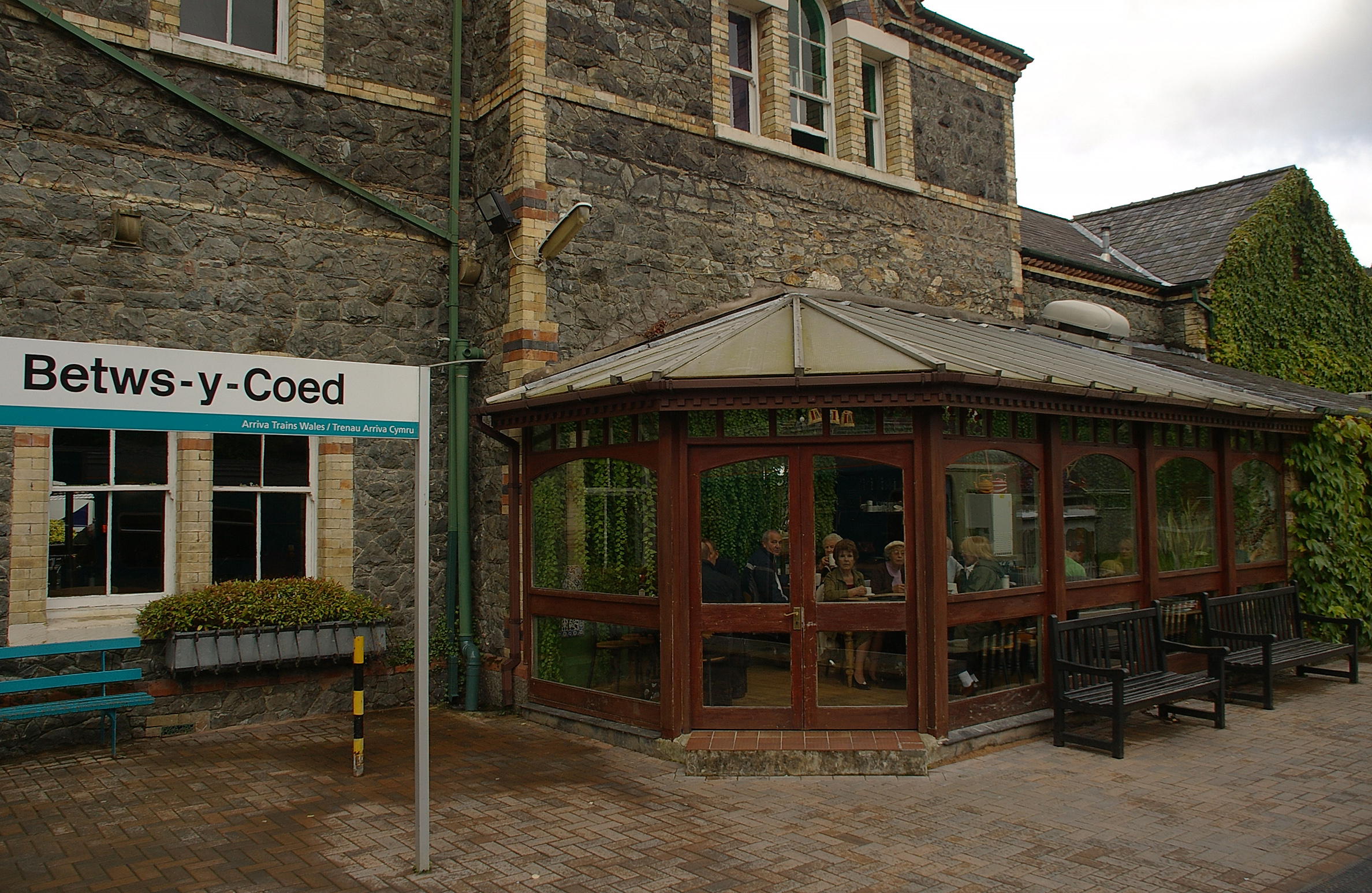
Patrons of the station café watch a train pass. (September 2009)

The Conwy Valley line was constructed by the London and North Western Railway with the primary aim of transporting dressed slate from the Blaenau Ffestiniog quarries to a specially built quay at Deganwy for export by sea. The original plans envisaged a railhead at Betws-y-Coed and a large goods yard was established with intended interchange to a proposed narrow gauge line (with a significant saving in construction costs) via the steeply graded Lledr Valley to Blaenau Ffestiniog. Other entrepreneurs proposed narrow gauge lines from Corwen to Betws-y-Coed, Penmachno to Betws-y-Coed and from Beddgelert to Betws-y-Coed. In the event the line to Blaenau, which was not completed until 1879, was built to standard gauge and the other proposals were abandoned.

Extensive passenger and goods facilities were however provided at Betws-y-Coed, where the station, which was opened in 1868, adjoins the London to Holyhead A5 turnpike road and was thus ideally located to serve many isolated communities in Snowdonia and also the rapidly developing tourist industry. In the LMS timetables the station was listed as "Bettws-y-Coed - Station for Capel Curig".

There was originally a passing loop with full length up and down platforms. A camping coach was positioned here by the London Midland Region from 1955 to 1959; this coach was replaced in 1960 by a Pullman camping coach which was here until 1970.

The loop was removed in the 1960s but the footbridge that previously gave access to the now removed down platform has been retained and provides access to the Conwy Valley Railway Museum, which runs a miniature railway and other attractions in the former goods yard.

The comprehensive range of passenger station buildings have been preserved and sympathetically adapted for use as a cafe, coffee shop, holiday apartments and retail outlets. The station now functions as an unstaffed halt. The platform was refurbished and a digital Passenger Information System installed in Spring 2009. Train running information is also provided via telephone and timetable poster boards.

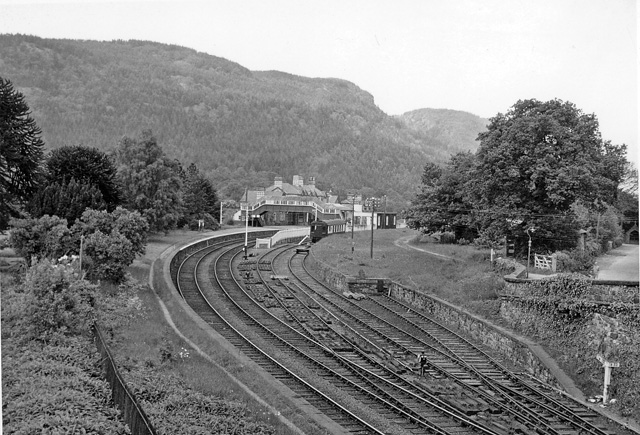
Betws-y-Coed Station in 1961 with Camping Coaches in the siding.

== Services ==
Six trains each way per day call on Mondays to Saturdays (approximately every three hours), with four trains each way on Sundays.

Services from this station were suspended following serious flood damage to the track and associated infrastructure resulting from the heavy rainfall associated with Storm Gareth on 16 March 2019. Repairs took several months to complete, with a replacement bus service in operation in the meantime. The line was reopened on 24 July 2019, in time for the staging of the National Eisteddfod in Llanrwst. Further storm damage to the north (this time from Storm Ciara) in February 2020 once again saw services suspended, with buses replacing trains from here until the line reopened again on 28 September 2020.

Preceding station	National Rail	Following station
Llanrwst	Transport for Wales Rail; Conwy Valley Line	Pont-y-Pant

== Village and surrounding area ==
Betws-y-Coed is an important tourist village and the station is centrally located beside the large village green. The district has magnificent scenery and there are several spectacular waterfalls, including the much visited Swallow Falls, which are served by hourly Sherpa buses from Betws-y-Coed station. There are several large hotels in the village. Next to the station is the Conwy Valley Railway Museum.

== Sources ==
- Butt, R. V. J. (October 1995). The Directory of Railway Stations: details every public and private passenger station, halt, platform and stopping place, past and present (1st ed.). Sparkford: Patrick Stephens Ltd. ISBN 978-1-85260-508-7. OCLC 60251199. OL 11956311M.
- McRae, Andrew (1997). British Railway Camping Coach Holidays: The 1930s & British Railways (London Midland Region). Vol. Scenes from the Past: 30 (Part One). Foxline. ISBN 1-870119-48-7.
- Quick, Michael (2022) [2001]. Railway passenger stations in Great Britain: a chronology (PDF). version 5.04. Railway & Canal Historical Society. Archived from the original (PDF) on 25 November 2022.
