= Dolwyddelan railway station =

Railway station in Conwy, Wales

Dolwyddelan
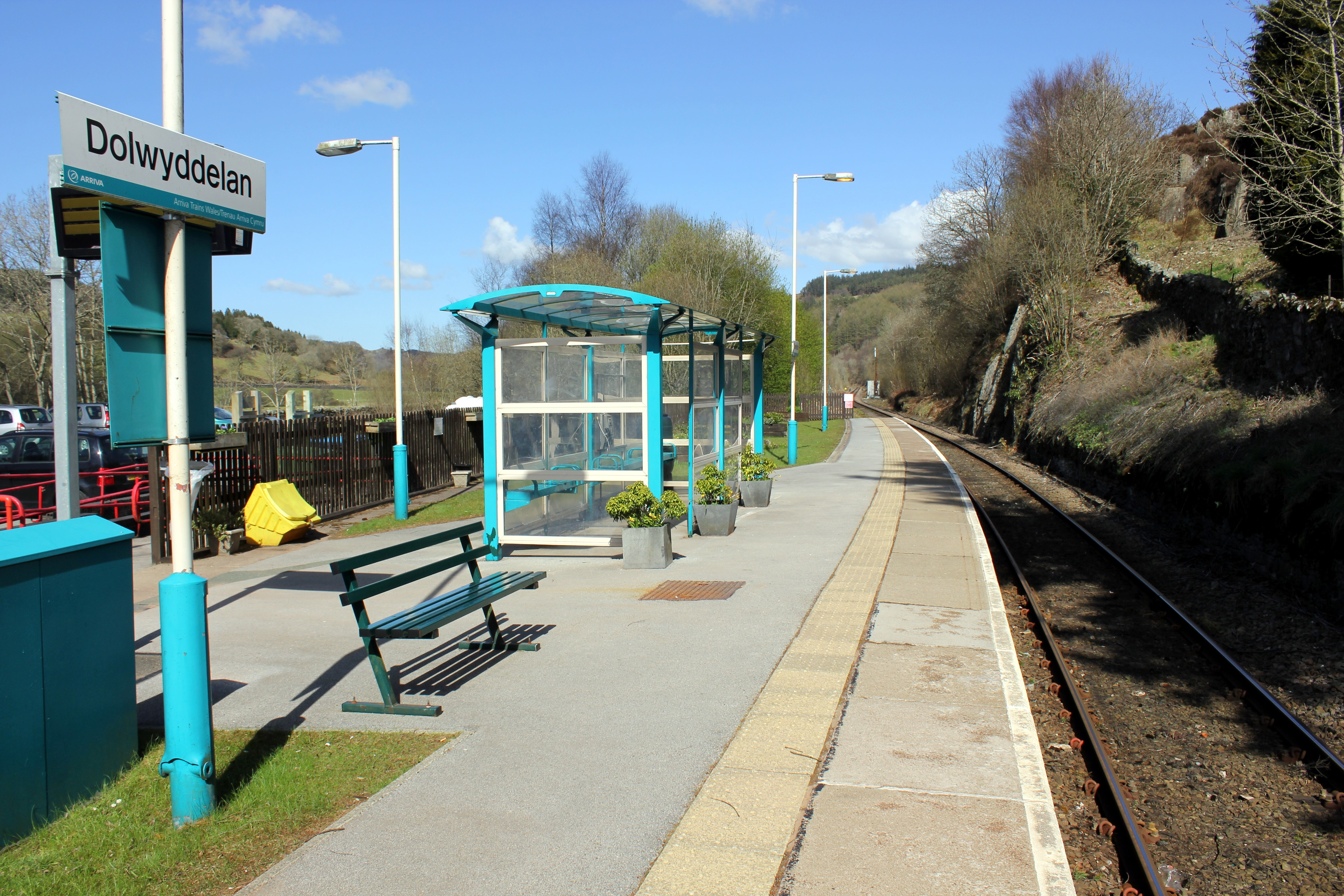

General information
- Location: Dolwyddelan, Conwy; Wales
- Coordinates: 53.052°N 3.885°W
- Grid reference: SH737521
- Manager: Transport for Wales Rail
- Platforms: 1

Other information
- Station code: DWD
- Classification: DfT category F2

Key dates
- 1879: Opened

Passengers
- 2021/22: ▲1,732
- 2022/23: ▲3,546
- 2023/24: ▲5,518
- 2024/25: ▲6,412
- 2025/26: ▼6,342
Location
Notes
- Passenger statistics from the Office of Rail and Road

Dolwyddelan railway station is a passenger station in the Lledr Valley, Wales, on the Conwy Valley Line from Llandudno Junction to Blaenau Ffestiniog, which is operated by Transport for Wales Rail. It is located at Pentre-Bont across the river a few hundred yards from the centre of Dolwyddelan. The station is unstaffed.

== History ==
During the 1980s and 1990s a narrow-gauge train was displayed on the station platform. The locomotive was 750 mm (2 ft 5 1/2 in) gauge Hunslet 2209, on loan from the Gloddfa Ganol railway museum.

== Facilities ==
The platform used to be an island platform as there was a passing loop on the west side. There used to be a substantial station building on the platform and a footbridge up to the road bridge. Both have now been removed and only remaining building is a standard waiting shelter. It is however fitted with a CIS display to offer train running details (these can also be obtained by phone and timetable posters). Step-free access is provided from the car park to the platform.

== Services ==
Five southbound and six northbound trains call on request Mondays to Saturdays (approximately every three hours), with four trains each way on Sundays.

From 16 March 2019 services were suspended from here due to major flood damage to the track further north (near Llanrwst) caused by Storm Gareth. The line remained closed for several months whilst repairs were carried out, with services resumed on 24 July 2019. Further storm damage to the north (this time from Storm Ciara) in February 2020 once again saw services suspended, with buses replacing trains from here until the line reopened again on 28 September 2020.

Preceding station	National Rail	Following station
Pont-y-Pant	Transport for Wales Rail; Conwy Valley Line	Roman Bridge
