= Dolwyddelan =

Village and community in Conwy, Wales

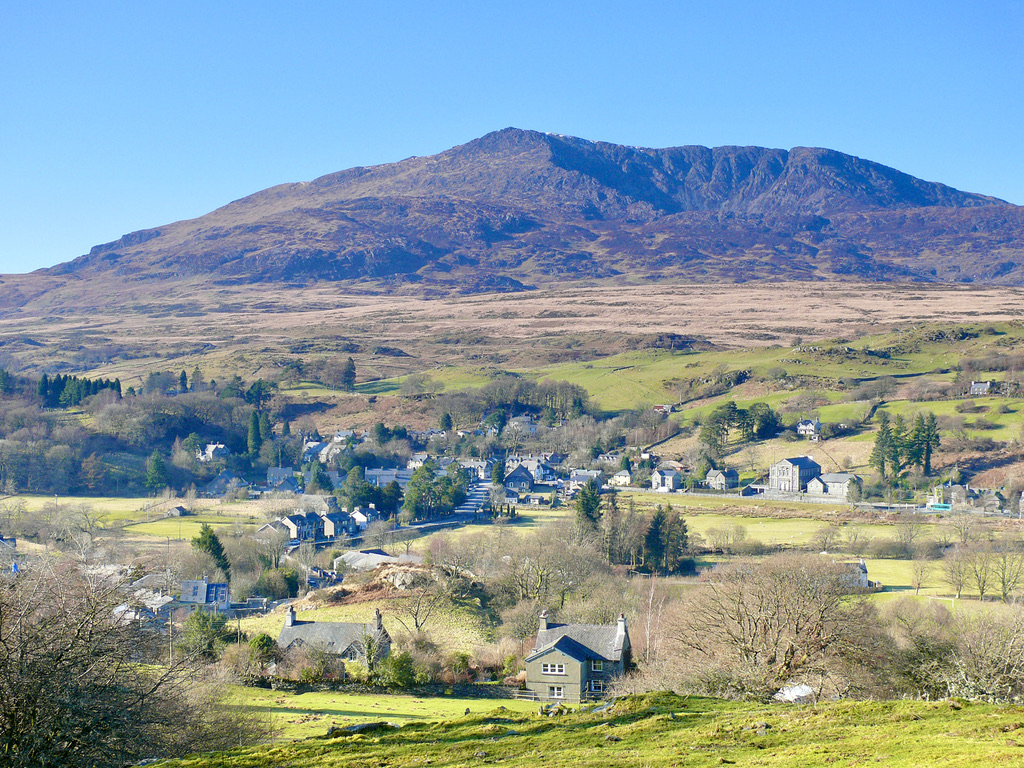
- View north over Dolwyddelan, with Moel Siabod behind

- Location within Conwy
- Population: 454
- OS grid reference: SH730511
- Community: Dolwyddelan
- Principal area: Conwy
- Preserved county: Clwyd
- Country: Wales
- Sovereign state: United Kingdom
- Post town: DOLWYDDELAN
- Postcode district: LL25
- Dialling code: 01690
- Police: North Wales
- Fire: North Wales
- Ambulance: Welsh
- UK Parliament: Bangor Aberconwy
- Senedd Cymru – Welsh Parliament: Bangor Conwy Môn
- List of places UK Wales Conwy 53.042°N 3.895°W Map of the community

Dolwyddelan (English: /ˌdɒlwɪˈðɛlæn/ dol-with-EL-an; Welsh: [ˌdɔlwɪˈðɛlan]; Welsh pronunciation) is a village and community in Conwy County Borough, Wales. The community occupies most of the valley of the Afon Lledr, and contains the settlements of Dolwyddelan, Pentre Bont, Blaenau Dolwyddelan, and Pont-y-Pant. It lies within Snowdonia, and the surrounding hills are part of the Moelwynion range. The population of the community was recorded as 454 in the 2021 census, and in the 2011 census the proportion of Welsh speakers was recorded as 50.8%.

Dolwyddelan was a centre within the Kingdom of Gwynedd in the twelfth and thirteenth centuries; it is likely that Prince Llywelyn the Great was born in Tomen Castell, west of the village, in c. 1173. Llywelyn built Dolwyddelan Castle some time between 1210 and 1240, although after its capture by Edward I of England in 1283, the military importance of the area declined. In 1488, the lease on the area was bought by Maredudd ab Ieuan, and it later became part of the large Gwydir Estate. In the nineteenth century slate was mined in the area.

== Toponymy ==
The spelling of the village's name has varied over the years, though there appear to be two primary spellings with two primary meanings. The common modern spelling "Dolwyddelan" is translated as "Gwyddelan's meadow", referring to Saint Gwyddelan, an Irish missionary of the 6th century, after whom the parish church is named. There is some question as to which came first, the castle or the name. Saint Gwyddelan is believed to have arrived around 600 AD. A variant of this spelling is Dolwyddelen, which was used by the railway between 1880 and 1980.

Before the First World War, the alternate spelling Dolyddelen was in common use; it is translated as "Elen's meadow", named after Elen Luyddog. Elen's Castle Hotel, which is on the east of the village, is also named after Elen Llyddog.

== Geography ==
The community lies in the valley of the Afon Lledr, which has its source in the south-west of the community on the eastern slopes of Ysgafell Wen. The river is approximately 10 miles (16 km) long, and exits the community approximately 1 mile (1.6 km) before its confluence with the River Conwy in Betws-y-Coed.

Dolwyddelan is surrounded on the north, south, and west by the Moelwynion range, which is within the wider region of Snowdonia (Eryri). The northern skyline is dominated by Moel Siabod (872 m (2,861 ft)), the highest mountain in the community. Other peaks in the area include Y Cribau (591 m (1,939 ft)) and Ysgafell Wen 672 m (2,205 ft) in the west, and Yr Arddu (589 m (1,932 ft)), Moel Dyrnogydd (524 m (1,719 ft)), Moel Farlwydd (577 m (1,893 ft)), and Y Ro Wen (599 m (1,965 ft)) to the south. The summits of several of these peaks form the community boundary, including Moel Siabod. Carreg Alltrem, a crag used by many rock climbers, is located about a mile south of the village.

== History ==
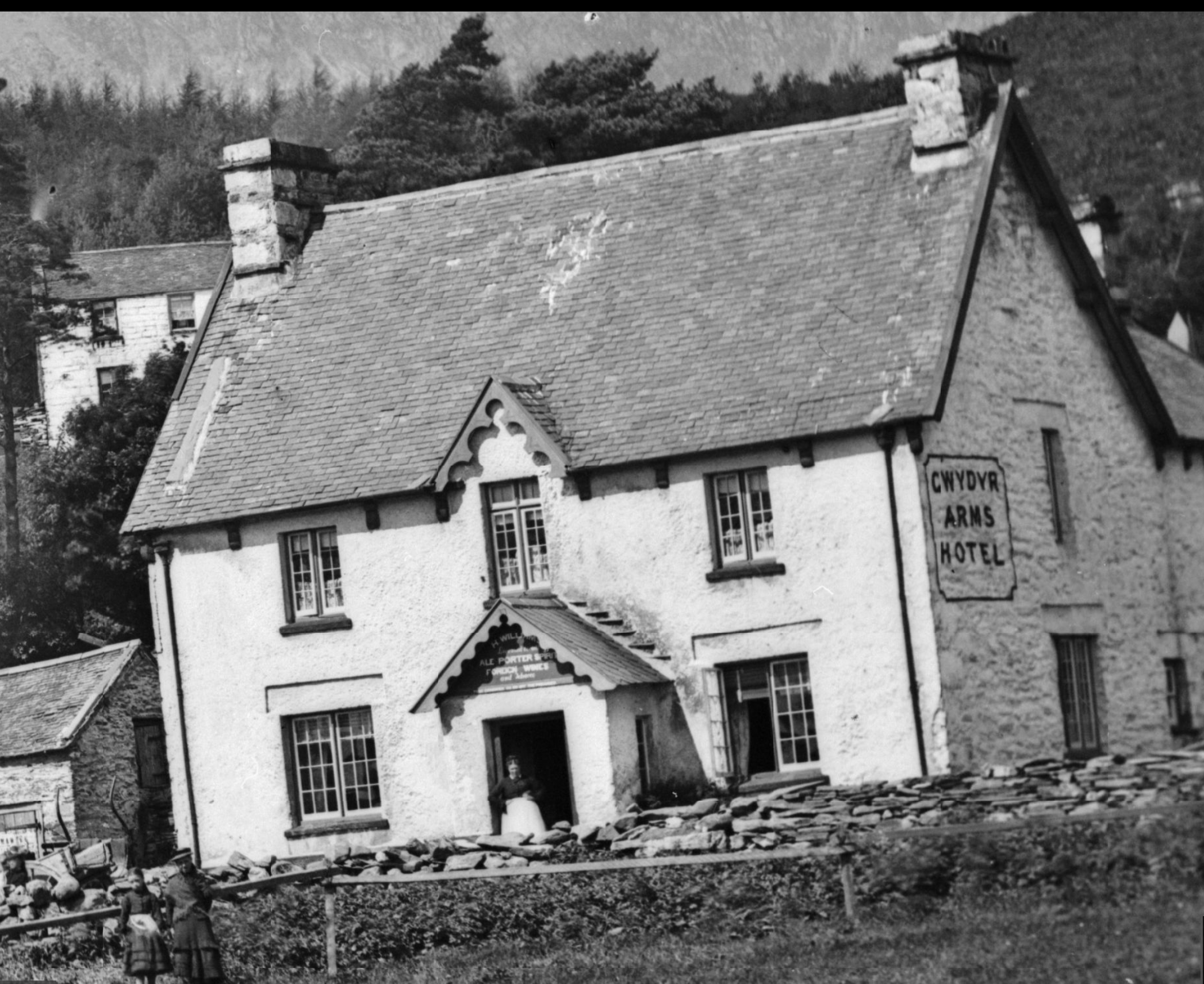
Gwydir Arms Hotel, Dolwyddelan, taken around 1875

The Lledr Valley contains a number of earthworks. On the side of Garnedd Pen y Bont to the north of Blaenau Dolwyddelan are a pair of huts dating from the Iron Age or Romano-British era. Blaenau Dolwyddelan also contains Ty'n y Ddol, a medieval long hut 'of national importance.' All three sites are scheduled monuments. A boundary bank marks part of the community's border with Beddgelert in the west, across the Bwlch y Rhediad pass between Carnedd y Cribau and Cerrig Cochion. It may originally have marked the boundary of lands belonging to Aberconwy Abbey, which are mentioned in a charter of c. 1198.

Between Blaenau Dolwyddelan and Dolwyddelan are the remains of Tomen Castell, a small fortification which stood a rocky outcrop between the Afon Lledr and the later Dolwyddelan Castle. The outcrop falls away steeply to the north, east, and south, and was defended by a ditch on the west where the ground is less precipitous. At its summit are the fragmentary ruins of a small rectangular tower with outer dimensions of approximately 8.8m by 9.5m and walls approximately 2.3 to 2.95m thick. There is a tradition that the later castle was the birthplace of Llywelyn the Great, which would make it an eleventh-century structure, however it is more likely that he was born at Tomen Castell. The site was designated a scheduled monument in 1988.

The lease on Dolwyddelan was purchased from the Crown by Maredudd ab Ieuan in 1488, and he restored the castle and built the present parish church. He later purchased neighbouring Gwydir and began building the present castle in 1515. Under Maredudd's descendants, the Wynn family, the Gwydir Estate expanded to over 36,000 acres (150 km^{2}) extending from near Blaenau Ffestiniog in the south to the edge of Conwy in the north. In 1678 the estate, and therefore Dolwyddelan, passed to the Barons Willoughby de Eresby, based in Lincolnshire, and in 1892 it became the property of Gilbert Heathcote-Drummond-Willoughby, 1st Earl of Ancaster. By the early 19th century the estate largely comprised the parishes of Dolwyddelan, Llanrhychwyn, Trefriw, and Gwydir, totalling some 55 square miles (140 km^{2}). Much of the estate was under mortgage, and in 1894 Dolwyddelan was sold off.

In the Victorian period Dolwyddelan was surrounded by slate quarries. These quarries worked the Nod Glas Formation, which extended across Mid and North Wales. It was primarily a bed of soft, black shale, but in the area of the Dolwyddelan syncline it was partially metamorphised into slate. The principal quarries were Prince Llewellyn, Chwarel Fedw, Chwarel Ddu, Ty'n-y-bryn, Penllyn, Rhiw-goch, and Ty'n-y-fallen.

In 1980 Walt Disney used Dolwyddelan Castle and surrounding grounds to film the external castle scenes in the film Dragonslayer.

=== Dolwyddelan Castle ===
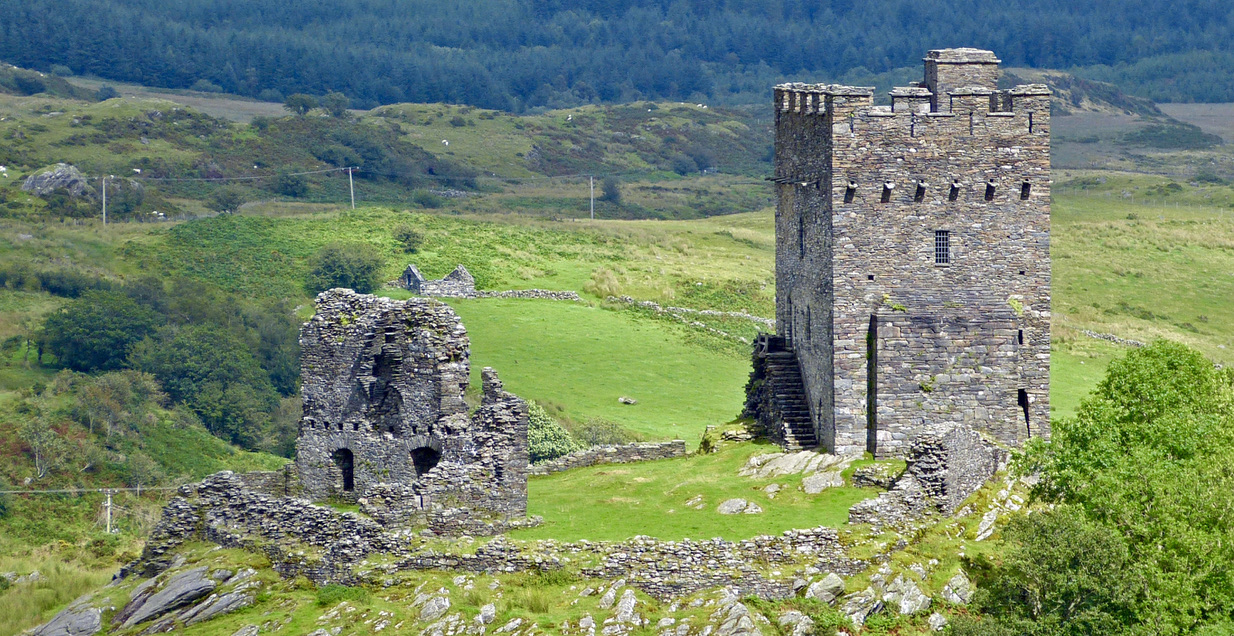
Dolwyddelan Castle from the path to Blaenau Dolwyddelan

Dolwyddelan Castle is located west of the village. The structure was likely begun by Llywelyn the Great between 1210 and 1240 in order to defend a north–south route within the Kingdom of Gwynedd. It was captured by King Edward I of England in 1283, and despite being immediately refortified its military significance subsequently declined. In 1488, Maredudd ab Ieuan purchased the lease and repaired the structure, but it was ruinous by the mid-nineteenth century. Between 1848 and 1850 the eastern tower was restored and reconstructed by Peter Drummond-Burrell, 22nd Baron Willoughby de Eresby, and in 1930 the castle was placed in state care; it is currently managed by Cadw, the Welsh Government's historic environment service. It was designated a grade I listed building in 1997, and is a scheduled monument.

The castle consists of two towers on the east and west sides of a small knoll, linked by walls to form a roughly circular enclosure. Much of its building history is uncertain, but the eastern tower is the oldest structure. It has been heightened twice, first by either Edward I or Maredudd ab Ieuan, and second during the nineteenth century restoration. The western tower may have been constructed in the late thirteenth century by Llywelyn ap Gruffudd, or shortly after the English capture of the castle.

=== Saint Gwyddelan's Church ===
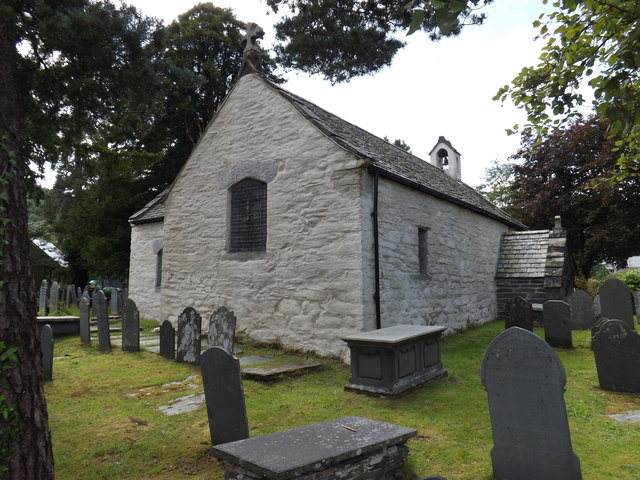
St Gwyddelan's Church

The parish church was built in c. 1500, likely by Maredudd ab Ieuan, and was originally a single-cell building. A south chapel was added in the sixteenth century by Robert Wynn of Plas Mawr, Conwy, and a north porch shortly before 1850 by Baron Willoughby de Eresby, who also paid to have the church re-roofed. It is a grade I listed building.

The church contains several interesting fixtures and fittings. The oak rood screen and bronze bell inside the church, called Cloch Wydellan, may have come from the previous church at Bryn y Bedd, just east of the village. There is a second bell in the bell-cote, inscribed 'S Richard Win 1639'. The east window contains nearly 60 fragments of stained glass dating from c. 1500, and the north window a single quarry depicting St Christopher carrying the infant Christ. Part of Maredudd ab Ieuan's memorial brass survives and depicts him kneeling in armour. Next to it is the Wynn memorial, which commemorates Maredudd and his wives Alice, Gwenhwyfar, and Margaret; his son John "Wynn" ap Maredudd and his wife Elena; and his grandson Maurice Wynn and his wives Jane, Anne, and Katherine. The lychgate outside the church collapsed after being accidentally hit in 2006, but was rebuilt in 2008 using new oak to replace the damaged sections.

== Transport ==
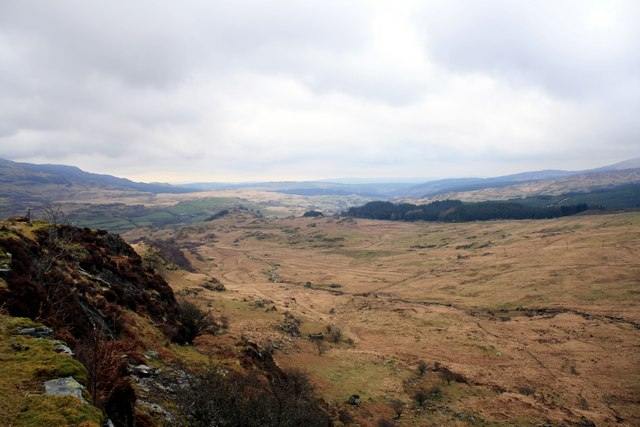
Crimea Pass looking toward Dolwyddelan

The Conwy Valley railway line passes through the community, which contains three railway stations: Pont-y-Pant, Dolwyddelan, and Roman Bridge. All three stations are request stops. After Roman Bridge the line enters the Ffestiniog Tunnel, which is 2.5 mi (4 km) long and passes beneath Moel Dyrnogydd before re-emerging shortly before Blaenau Ffestiniog railway station.

Roman Bridge railway station is named after the nearby bridge, known as Pont Sarn-Ddu in Welsh, which is the original crossing point of the Afon Lledr on the Roman road from Blaenau to Dolwyddelan. It is possible that the bridge contains some medieval or earlier fabric, and the current stone roadway probably replaces a timber original.3157 The main road through the valley is now the A470, which enters the community from the east and passes through Dolwyddelan before turning south and climbing over the Crimea Pass (Bwlch y Gorddinan) to Blaenau Ffestiniog.

== Governance ==
Dolwyddelan has a community council, which meets six times per year in Dolwyddelan Community Centre. The community is part of the Betws-y-Coed and Trefriw ward of Conwy County Borough Council, which consists of the communities of Betws-y-Coed, Capel Curig, Dolwyddelan, and Trefriw and elects one councillor. In Senedd elections, which use an additional-member system, Dolwyddelan is part of the Aberconwy constituency and the North Wales electoral region. In the Parliament of the United Kingdom the community is part of the Bangor Aberconwy constituency.

== Notable residents ==
- Paul Griffiths, playwright, writer, and theatre critic lived and worked in the village.
- Baron Gwydyr, the Earl of Ancaster, lived in the house which is now Elen's Castle Hotel.
- Angharad James, poet, lived in Cwm Penamnen, to the south of the village, most of her life and is buried in Saint Gwyddelan's church.
- Rachel Johncock, sprinter lives in the village; she represented Great Britain in the 2012 World Junior Championships in Athletics for the 100m and 4×100 m relay.
- Llywelyn the Great (ca.1173 – 1240) King of Gwynedd.
- Ellis Pierce, also known as Elis o'r Nant, was from Dolwyddelan.
- Eigra Lewis Roberts, writer, won two Prose Medals, National Eisteddfod Drama Crown and Medal. She was born in Blaenau Ffestiniog, and now lives in Dolwyddelan.
- John Jones, Talysarn, Welsh preacher was born in Dolwyddelan.
- Thomas Firbank, writer "I bought a mountain" and decorated soldier.
