= Nod Glas Formation =

Geological group in mid Wales

- Stratigraphic range: Hirnantian Stage
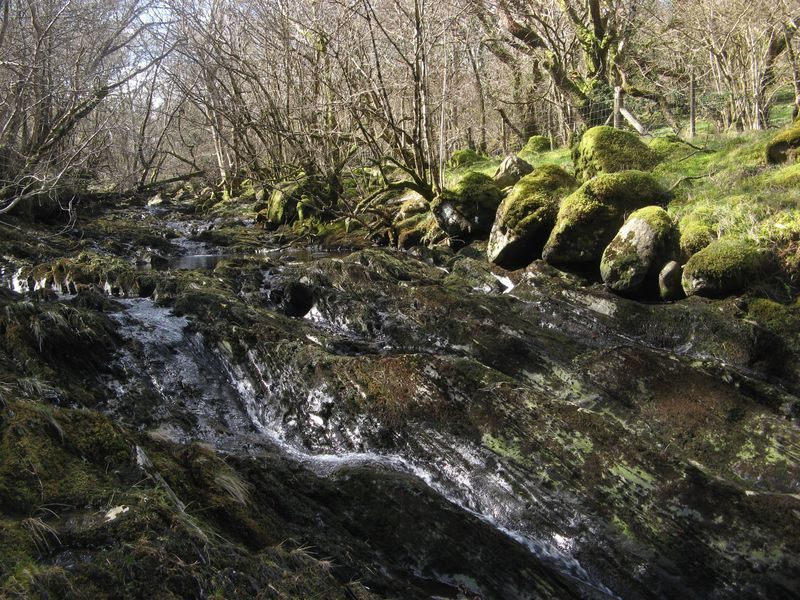
- River bed of the Afon Ddu, near Dolgarrog, showing the exposed Nod Glas Formation
- Type: Formation
- Underlies: Broad Vein Mudstone Formation
- Overlies: Ceiswyn Formation
- Thickness: Typically 20 metres (66 ft) to 30 metres (98 ft), up to 400 metres (1,300 ft) at the northern end

Lithology
- Primary: Mudstone

Location
- Coordinates: 53°10′37″N 3°50′27″W
- Region: Mid Wales
- Country: Wales

Type section
- Named for: Adapted from "Blue Mark" a quarryman's term for the strata
- Named by: W. J. Pugh

The Nod Glas Formation (also known as the Nod Glas Black Shale, the Cadnant Shale, the Penarwel Mudstones or just Nod Glas) is an Ordovician lithostratigraphic group (a sequence of rock strata) in Mid Wales. The rock of the formation is made up of pyritous, graptolitic mudstone that is generally black in colour. It weathers to a soft, very well cleaved and coal-like material. The formation runs from Conwy in the north, down to Cardigan Bay in the area around Aberdyfi and Tywyn, though it is not a continuous over this area.

The formation is the topmost of the Caradoc Series in North Wales, and the name refers to all the black shale beds in the area. In South Wales, the equivalent beds of shale are called the Dicranograptus Shales.

== North Wales ==
Between Tywyn and Aberllefenni the Nod Glas Formation is about 25 metres (82 ft) thick. The section between Aberllefenni and Aberangell is the type locality for the formation. North of Corris, towards Bwlch y Groes, the formation gradually thins and ceases entirely at the pass. Just north of Dinas Mawddwy, at Aber Cywarch the exposed shale beds contain thin layers of limestone. The formation appears again to the east of Bwlch y Groes and can be found in thicknesses up to 19.5 metres (64 ft) as far east as Welshpool. There is a further outcrop approximately 10 kilometres (6.2 mi) long west of Glyn Ceiriog.

There is a further significant layer of the Nod Glas running along the Conwy and Lledr vallies. Within the Dolwyddelan syncline the shales have been compressed and are quarried in Chwarel Ddu as slate. There are further outcroppings around Betws-y-coed where again there was some quarrying of the formation as slate. At Dolgarrog the Nod Glas is between 83 metres (272 ft) and 400 metres (1,300 ft) thick. There is one further outcropping of the formation, on the Llŷn Peninsula which is about 16 metres (52 ft) thick, and is known locally as the Penarwel Mudstones.

== Fossils ==
Fossils of graptolites, conodonts and trilobites have been found in the Nod Glas Formation near Welshpool.

== Other uses ==
The term Nod Glas was also used in Wales to denote a blue-black sheep mark.
