= Wynn baronets of Gwydir (1611) =

Escutcheon of the Wynn baronets of Gwydir

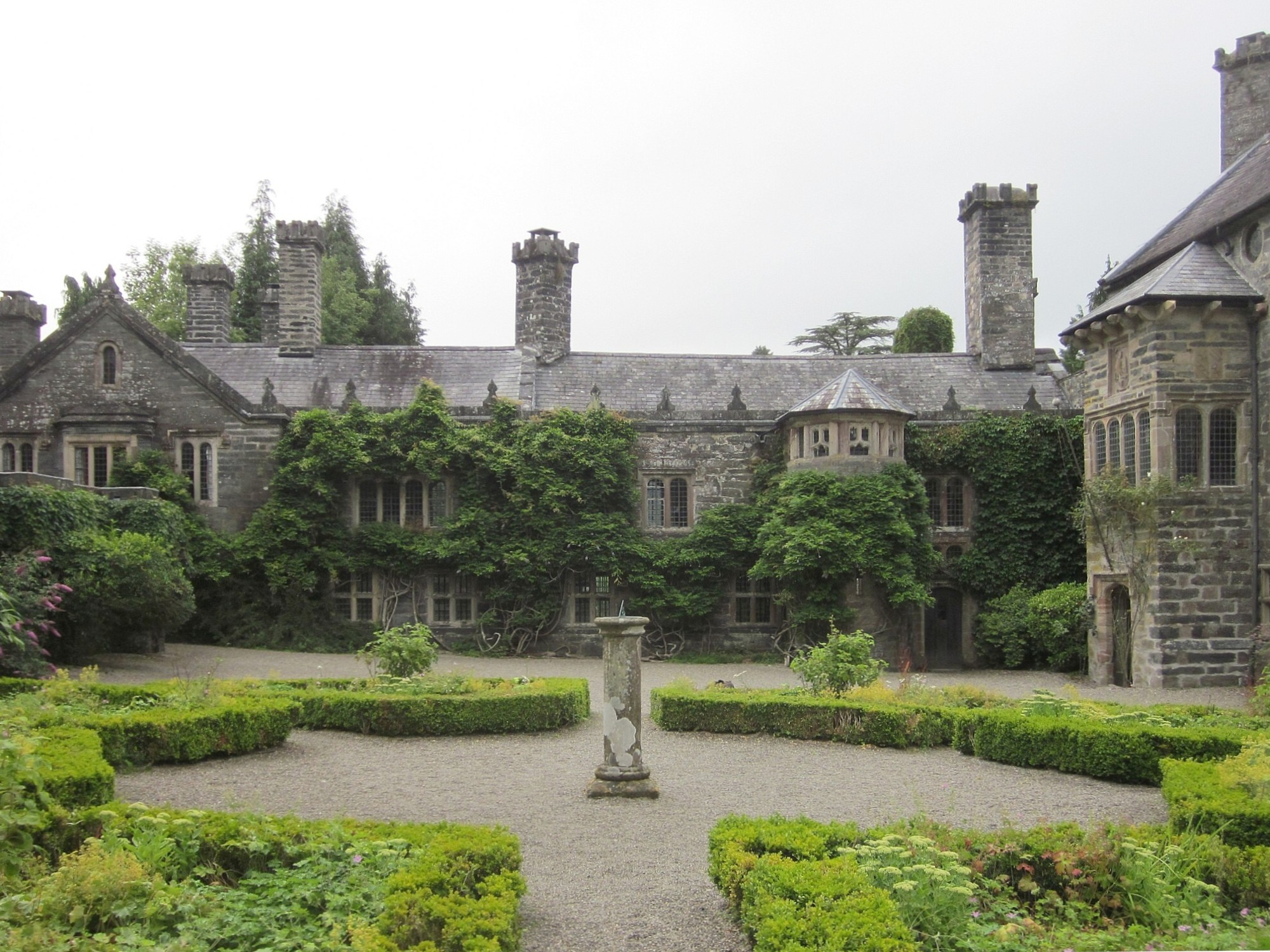
Gwydir Castle, the former family seat of the Wynn baronets

The Wynn baronetcy, of Gwydir in the County of Carnarvon, was created in the Baronetage of England on 29 June 1611, for John Wynn, knighted in 1606. He married Jane Bulkeley, daughter of Sir Richard Bulkeley of Beaumaris.

The 2nd Baronet sat in parliament for six different constituencies between 1614 and 1649. The 4th Baronet twice represented Caernarvonshire in parliament.

The 5th Baronet succeeded his cousin the 4th Baronet, and inherited the Wynnstay estate, near Ruabon, north Wales. He was a Member of Parliament five times between 1679 and 1713. The title became extinct on his death in 1719.

== Wynn baronets, of Gwydir (1611) ==
- Sir John Wynn, 1st Baronet (c.1553–1627)
- Sir Richard Wynn, 2nd Baronet (c.1588–1649)
- Sir Owen Wynn, 3rd Baronet (c.1592–1660)
- Sir Richard Wynn, 4th Baronet (c. 1625–1674)
- Sir John Wynn, 5th Baronet (c.1628–1719)

== Extended family ==
- The 4th Baronet's daughter Mary Wynn, an only child, was the wife of Robert Bertie, 17th Baron Willoughby de Eresby and 1st Duke of Ancaster and Kesteven, of Grimsthorpe Castle. The line is now represented by the Baron Carrington who sold Gwydir Castle in 1921.
- A descendant of the 4th Baronet was Sir Peter Burrell, husband of Priscilla Bertie, 21st Baroness Willoughby de Eresby, of Drummond Castle. He was created Baron Gwydyr in 1796. Peter's wife Priscilla was a daughter of Peregrine Bertie, 3rd Duke of Ancaster and Kesteven, and Duchess Mary Panton.
- On the extinction of the baronetcy, the family estate was inherited by a cousin. The family is represented in the same area today by the Williams-Wynn baronets. Wynnstay had been the seat of the Wynn family. The mansion eventually passed to Jane Thelwell and her husband Sir Watkin Williams-Wynn, 3rd Baronet who inherited the estate.
- John Bodvel (1617–1663) was Member of Parliament for Anglesey and worked as the commission of array for Caernarfonshire in 1643, then also was Custos Rotulorum of Anglesey, attending the Oxford Parliament (1644). He was a grandson of the 1st Baronet, and also a great-grandson of Hugh Gwyn Gwyn being one of the children of John Wynne of Bodvean (died 1576).

== Background ==
The members of this line were heirs to the House of Aberffraw's claim to the Kingdom of Gwynedd and subsequently the Principality of Wales as direct descendants of Prince Owain Gwynedd, the King of Gwynedd.

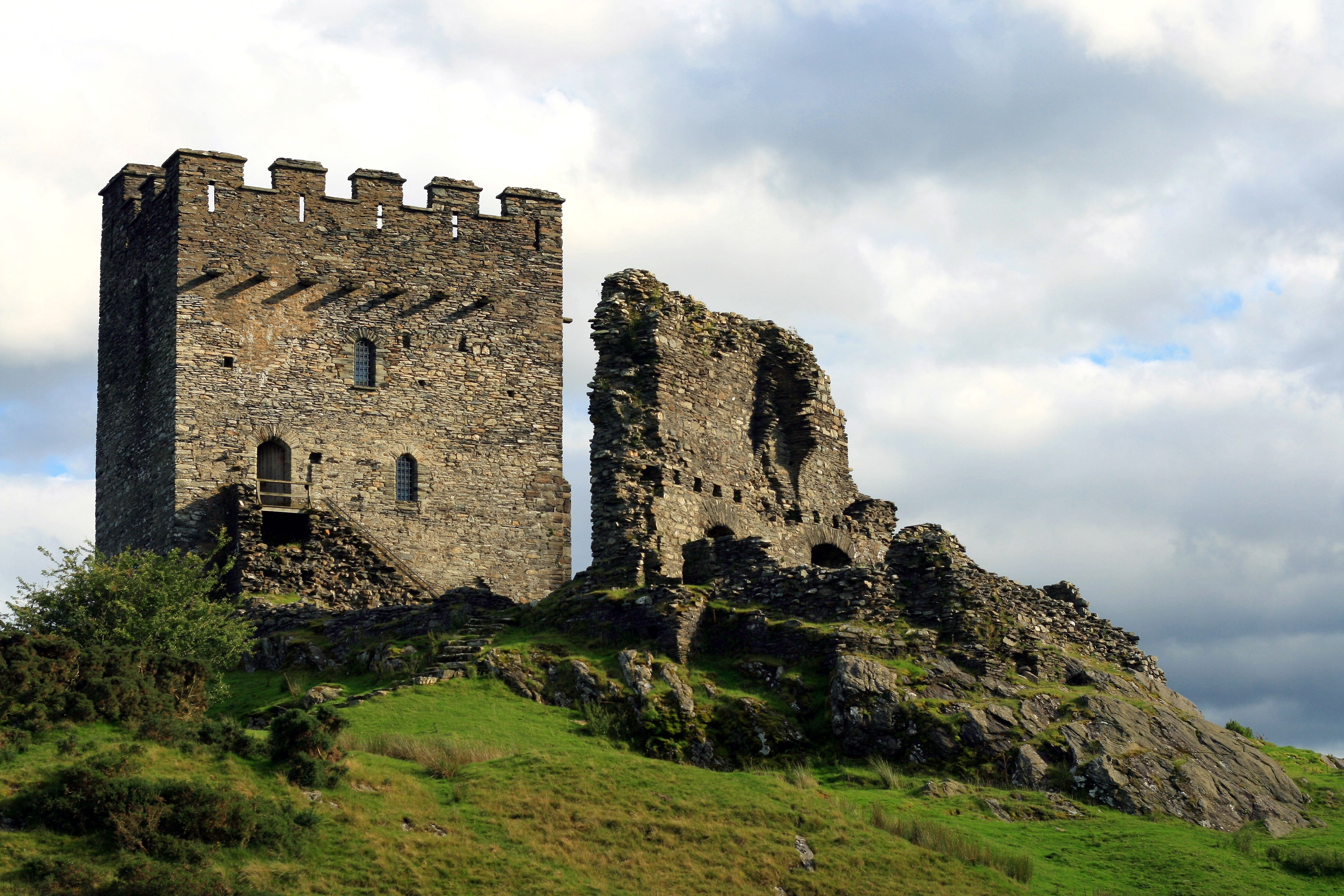
Dolwyddelan Castle, leased by John "Wynn" ap Maredudd's father

The history of the Wynns of Gwydir begins with the father of Maurice Wynn, John "Wynn" ap Maredudd. John had rebuilt Gwydir around 1555 after inheriting the lease of Gwydir from his father Maredudd ab Ieuan; Maredudd had purchased the estate from Dafydd ap Hywel Coetmor around 1500. Maredudd also purchased the lease for Dolwyddelan Castle, built Penamnen, and owned lands in the commote of Nant Conwy and Llanfrothen. Maurice was the first to adopt the family name 'Wynn' and was a high sheriff and a member of parliament for Caernarvonshire during the 16th century.

A younger branch of the Wynn of Gwydir family arose in the area of Berthddu and Bodysgallen as descendants of Gruffudd Wynn, the younger brother of Maurice (died 1580); they married into the Mostyn baronets and Vaughan of Corsygedol and Talhenbont families.

=== Wynn of Gwydir family tree ===
- Maurice Wynn (Morys Wynn ap John) died on 18 August 1580.
  - Sir John Wynn, 1st Baronet.
    - Sir Richard Wynn, 2nd Baronet.
    - Sir Owen Wynn, 3rd Baronet.
      - Sir Richard Wynn, 4th Baronet.
    - Henry Wynn
      - Sir John Wynn, 5th Baronet.

== Notes ==
Baronetage of England
Preceded by Bendish baronets	Wynn baronets of Gwydir; 29 June 1611	Succeeded by Throckmorton baronets
