= Sir John Wynn, 5th Baronet =

Welsh politician and baronet

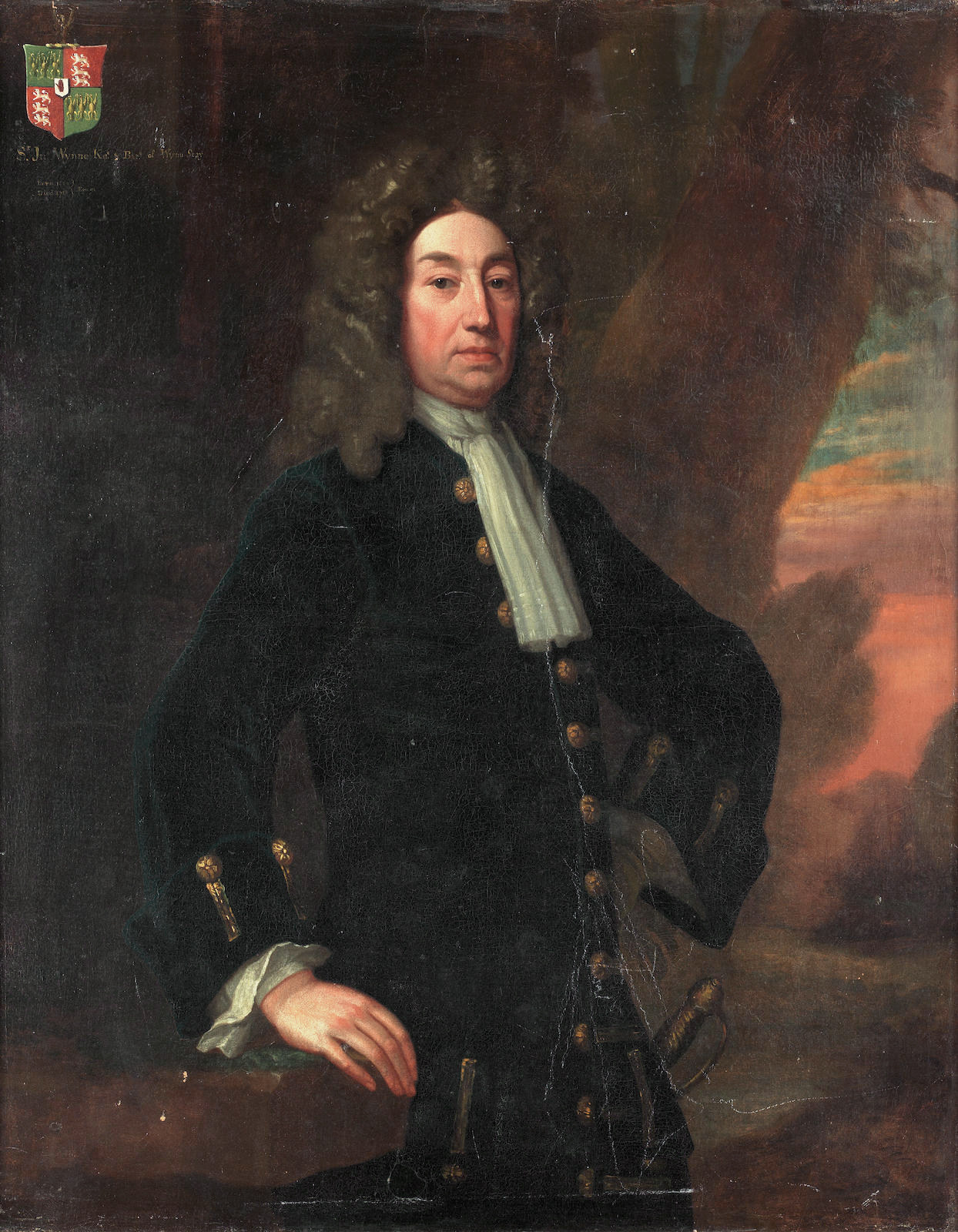
John Wynn, 5th Bt

Sir John Wynn, 5th Baronet (1628 – 11 January 1719) was a Welsh landowner and Tory politician who sat in the English and British House of Commons between 1679 and 1713. He was among the largest landowners in Wales.

== Early life ==
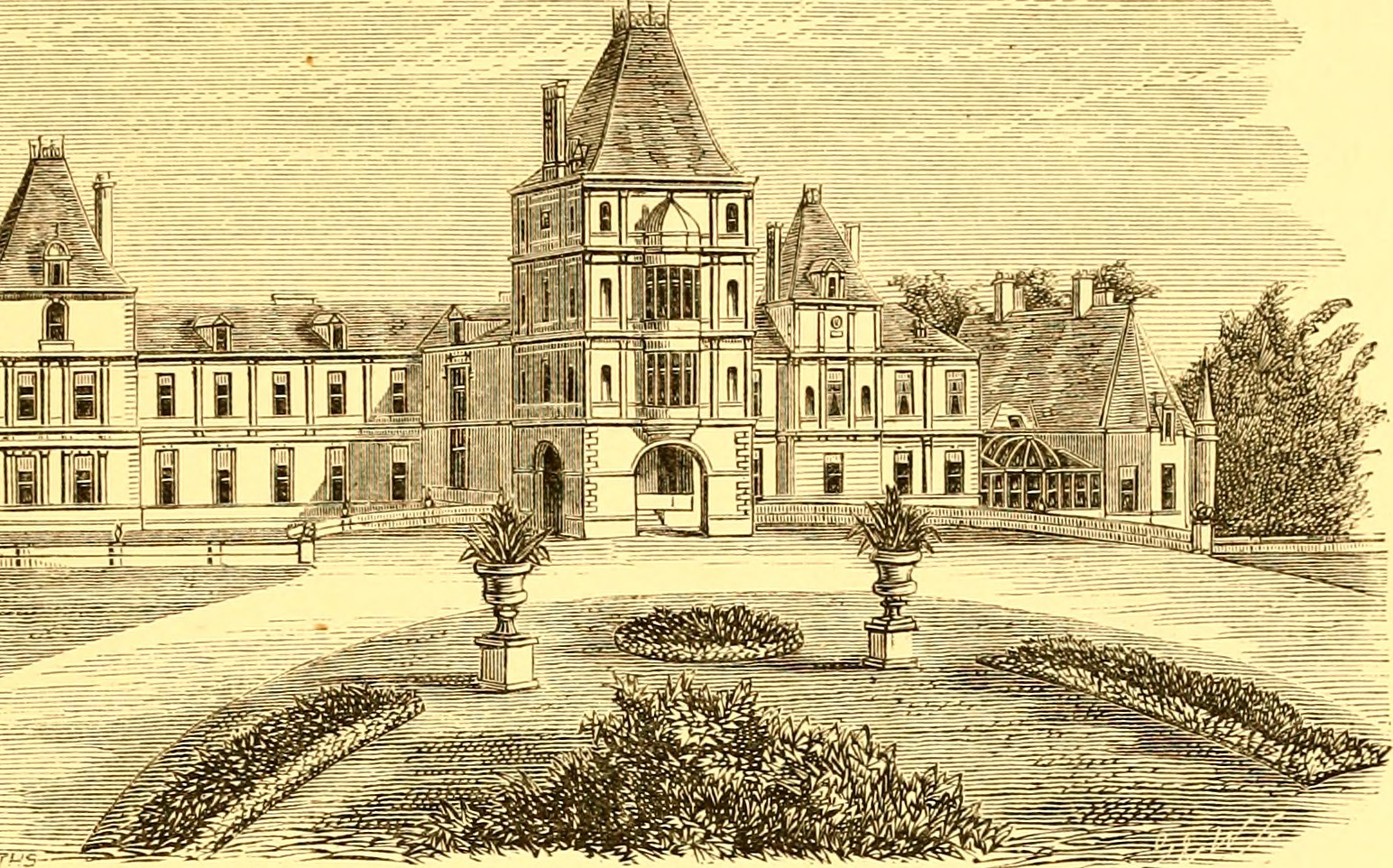
Wynnstay Estate, inherited by the 5th Baronet

Wynn was the only son of Henry Wynn of Rhiwgoch, Merioneth, and was educated at the Inner Temple, 1646. He inherited the Watstay Estate through his marriage to Jane Evans (daughter of Eyton Evans of Watstay), which he renamed the Wynnstay Estate. He also, allegedly, won the manor of Stanwardine in Shropshire from Thomas Corbett in a snail race.

He succeeded his cousin Sir Richard Wynn, 4th Baronet as a baronet in 1674 but did not inherit the Gwydyr Estate, which passed to his predecessor's daughter Mary (later wife of Robert Bertie, 1st Duke of Ancaster and Kesteven).

== Career ==
Wynn served as High Sheriff of Denbighshire for 1671–3, as High Sheriff of Caernarvonshire for 1674-75 and as High Sheriff of Merionethshire for 1675–1676. He was Custos Rotulorum of Merionethshire for 1678–1688, 1690–96 and 1700–1711.

Wynn was returned as Member of Parliament for Merioneth in 1679. He was returned again in 1685 and held the seat until 1695. At the 1698 English general election he was returned as MP for Caernarvon Boroughs. At the 1705 English general election he was returned unopposed as MP for Caernarvonshire. He was returned unopposed at the 1708 British general election and the 1710 British general election. He retired at the 1713 British general election

== Later life ==
Wynn lived into his nineties, mainly residing in London, but died without issue in 1719. On his death the Wynn baronetcy became extinct and the ancient House of Aberffraw (which claimed direct descent from Rhodri Mawr ap Merfyn in the late 9th century and through him to the legendary line of Brutus) was left without known male issue.

== Possible heir and relatives ==
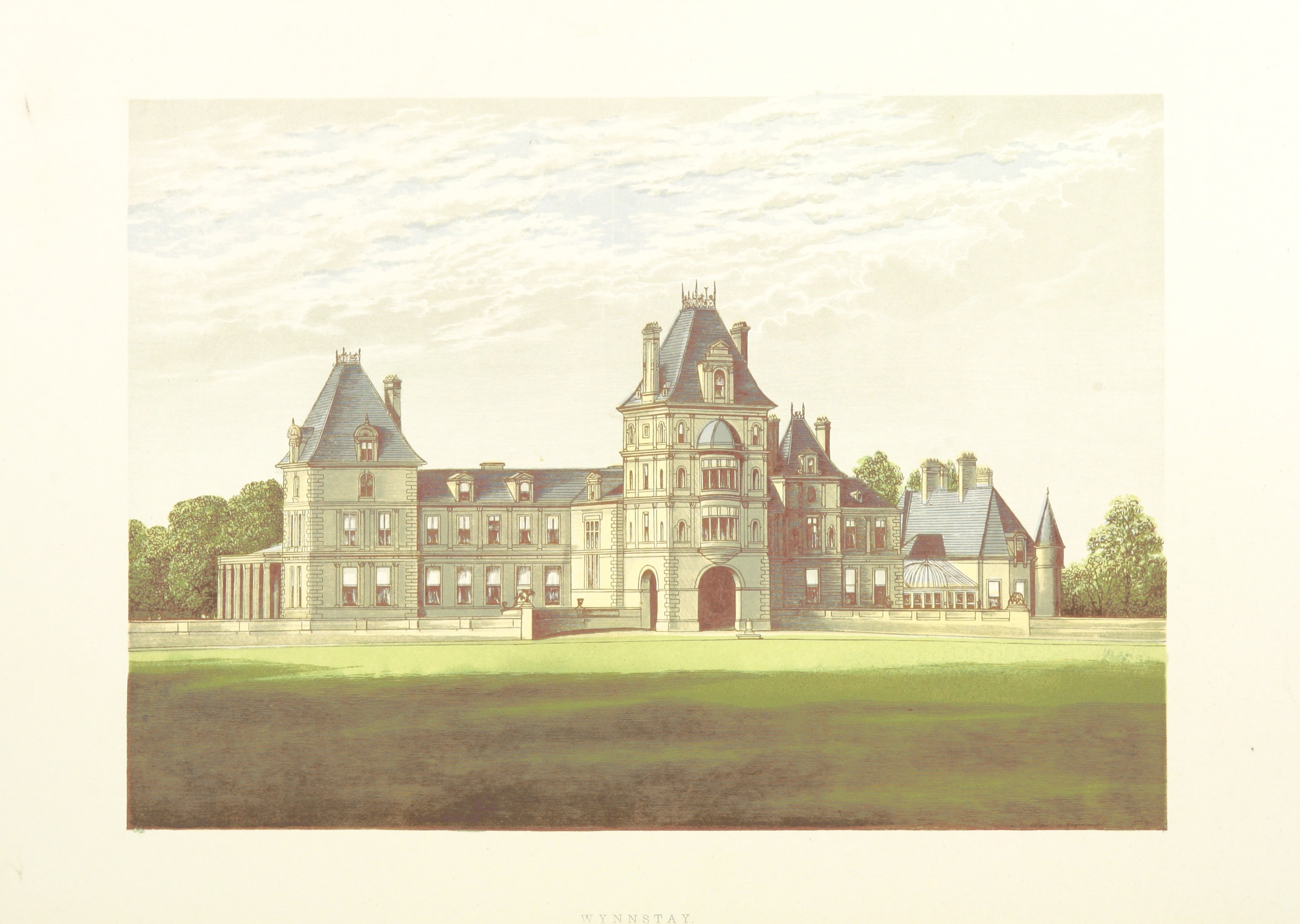
Wynnstay Estate, Denbighshire, 1879

Had Thomas Jones (Twm Siôn Cati) really been the illegitimate son of John "Wynn" ap Maredudd (as claimed by Sir John Wynn, 1st Baronet in his family history), his children would have been next in line, illegitimate sons having the same rights of inheritance as legitimate ones under ancient Welsh law. There are also several claims that "lost" relatives such as a supposed Colonel Hugh Wynn who is alleged to have moved to Virginia and raised a family.

However, with no clear heir, Sir John bequeathed the entire Wynnstay estate to Jane Thelwall, great-granddaughter of the first baronet and wife of Sir William Williams, 2nd Baronet (c. 1665 – 20 October 1740). Sir John Wynn and Sir William Williams were the two largest landowners in north Wales at that time and together the combined estate dwarfed all others. In honour of his wife's ancestry Sir William Williams changed his name to Sir William Williams-Wynn of Wynnstay.

The current baronet is Sir David Watkin Williams-Wynn, 11th Baronet (born 1940).

== Notes ==
Parliament of England
Preceded by William Price	Member of Parliament for Merioneth; 1679–1681	Succeeded by Sir Robert Owen
Preceded by Sir Robert Owen	Member of Parliament for Merioneth; 1685–1695	Succeeded by Hugh Nanney
Preceded by Sir Robert Owen	Member of Parliament for Caernarvon Boroughs; 1698–1705	Succeeded by Thomas Bulkeley
Preceded by Thomas Bulkeley	Member of Parliament for Caernarvonshire; 1705–1707	Succeeded by Parliament of Great Britain
Parliament of Great Britain
Preceded by Parliament of England	Member of Parliament for Caernarvonshire; 1707–1713	Succeeded by William Griffith
Honorary titles
Preceded by William Owen	Custos Rotulorum of Merionethshire; 1678–1688	Succeeded by The Marquess of Powis
Preceded by Sir William Williams, Bt	Custos Rotulorum of Merionethshire; 1690–1711	Succeeded by Edward Vaughan
Baronetage of England
Preceded by Richard Wynn	Baronet (of Gwydir); 1674–1719	Extinct
