= Sheriff of Caernarvonshire =

Welsh county ceremonial officer

This is a list of Sheriffs of Caernarvonshire (or Carnarvonshire).

The Sheriff is the oldest secular office under the Crown. Formerly the Sheriff was the principal law enforcement officer in a county but over the centuries most of the responsibilities associated with the post have been transferred elsewhere or are now defunct, so that its functions are now largely ceremonial. The Sheriff changes every March.

On 1 April 1974, under the provisions of the Local Government Act 1972, the counties of Caernarvonshire, Wales, together with that of Anglesey and Merionethshire were abolished along with their shrievalties, and were replaced by the new county of Gwynedd and the new office of High Sheriff of Gwynedd.

== List of Sheriffs ==
- 1284–1295: Richard de Pulsedon, brother of Sir Roger de Pulesdon, Sheriff of Anglesey
- 1295–1299: Robert de London
- 1299–1307: Henry de Dynynton
- 1308–1309 or 1310: Gruffudd ap Rhys
- 1309 or 1310–1315: William Troutwyn
- 1315–1316: Richard Casteleyn
- 1316–1321: John de Sapy
- 1321–1325: Giles de Bello Campo (Giles de Beauchamp)
- 1325–1326: Madog Gloddaith
- 1326–1327: Richard Ate
- 1327–1329: Giles de Bello Campo
- 1329–1332: Richard Ate
- 1332–1337: Hywel ap Henri
- 1337: Stephen de Pulton
- 1339–1345: Richard FitzAlan, 10th Earl of Arundel
- 1345–1346: Edward de St John
- 1347–1348: Einion ap Philip
- 1348–1350: Robert de Holewell
- 1350–1351: Robert de Parys
- 1351–1359: Einion ap Gruffudd
- 1359–1360: Thomas de Middelton
- unknown date: Ade Haye
- unknown date: Robert Stircheley
- 1376–1378: Hugh Coly
- 1378–1382: William de Hunton
- 1382–1385: Thomas de Wodelef
- 1385–1390: Ifan ab Einion ap Gruffudd
- 1390–1395: Hugh Coly
- 1395–1399: Richard de Pykemere
- 1399–1407?: Siôn ap Hywel
- 1407: Reginald Bayldon
- 1407–1408: John Salshall
- 1408–1409: Robert Fenrether
- 1410–1411: Thomas Camvill
- 1411–1413: Hugh Huls
- 1413–1437: Nicholas Saxton
- 1437–1460: John Hynde
- 1461–1473: Sir Henry Bolde
- 1473–1483: Anthony Woodville, 2nd Earl Rivers
- 1484–1485: Thomas Tunstall
- 1485–1500: Wiliam ap Gruffudd ap Robyn of Cochwillan
- 1500–1527: Sir Hugh Vaughan jointly with
- 1505–1506: Ralph Birkenhead
- 1527–1540?: Sir Richard Bulkeley
- 1540?–1541: Edmund Lloyd, of Glynllifon
- 1541: Griffith ap Robert Vaughan
- 1541 William Wynn Williams of Cochwillan
- 1542 Sir Richard Bulkeley, of Beaumaris, Kt
- 1543 John Puleston of Caernarvon
- 1544 John "Wynn" ap Maredudd, of Gwydir Castle
- 1545 Hugh Peak, of Conway

=== Edward VI ===
- 1546 William Williams, of Cochwillan
- 1547 Griffith ap William Madog, of Llwyndyrus
- 1548 John ap Robert ap Llywelyn Ithel, of Caftellmarch
- 1549 Sir Richard Bulkeley, of Beaumaris, Kt
- 1550 John Wynn ap Hugh of Bodyel in Llannor
- 1551 Hugh Peake, of Conway
- 1552 William Williams, of Cochwillan

=== Mary I ===
- 1553 Griffith ap William Madog, of Llwyndyrus
- 1554 Maurice Wynn, of Gwydir Castle
- 1555 Griffith Davies of Caernarvon
- 1556 John "Wynn" ap Maredudd, of Gwydir Castle
- 1557 Sir Richard Bulkeley of Beaumaris, Kt.

=== Elizabeth I ===
- 1558 Ellis Price, Plas Iolyn, doctor of law
- 1559 John Wynn ap Hugh of Bodvel in Llannor
- 1560 Robert Pugh of Creuddin
- 1561 William Glynn, of Glynn Llivon
- 1562 William Griffith, of Caernarvon
- 1563 Griffith Glynne, of Pwllheli
- 1564 Griffith Davies of Caernarvon
- 1565 William Herbert, of Swansea, Kt
- 1566 Sir Rice Griffith of Penrhyn, Kt
- 1567 William Mostyn of Mostyn Hall
- 1568 Thomas Owens, of Plas Du (the celebrated Epigrammatist's ancestor)
- 1569 Maurice Wynn, of Gwydir Castle
- 1570 Edward Williams; alias Edward Wynne ap Williams, of Maes y Castell
- 1571 Richard Mostyn, of Bodyscallen
- 1572 Griffith Davies of Caernarvon
- 1573 Rice Thomas, of Caernarvon
- 1574 Rowland Pulefton, of Caernarvon
- 1575 Richard Peake, of Conway
- 1576 Edward Conway, of Bryn Eiryn
- 1577 Maurice Wynn, of Gwydir Castle
- 1578 Richard Vaughan, of Llwyndyrys, Caernarvonshire
- 1579 Maurice Kyffin, of Maenan
- 1580 William Thomas, of Caernarvon
- 1581 William Maurice of Clenennau
- 1582 John Griffith, of Caernarvon
- 1583 Thomas Mostyn of Mostyn Hall
- 1584 John Wynne ap Hugh ap Richard, of Bodwrda
- 1585 John Vaughan, of Penmachno (the Queen's footman)
- 1586 Thomas Madryn, of Madryn
- 1587 John Wynn of Gwydir Castle
- 1588 Hugh Gwyn Bodvel of Bodvel, Llannor
- 1589 Griffith ap John Griffith, of Llŷn
- 1590 Robert Wynne of Conway
- 1591 William Williams, of Cochwillan
- 1592 Richard Puleston, of Caernarvon
- 1593 Richard Gwynne, of Caernarvon
- 1594 Robert Wynne, of Bryncir
- 1595 Thomas Wynn Brinkyer
- 1596 William Maurice of Clenennau
- 1597 Hugh Gwynne, of Bodvel
- 1598 Thomas Vaughan, of Pant Glas
- 1599 William Williams, of Vaynol
- 1600 Hugh Gwynne, of Penarth
- 1601 Richard Vaughan, of Plas Hen
- 1602 Maurice Lewis, of Ffestiniog

=== James I ===
- 1603 John Wynne, of Gwydir
- 1604 John Griffith, of Llŷn
- 1605 Robert Madryn, of Madryn
- 1606 Hugh Bodurda, of Bodurda
- 1607 William Williams, of Vaenol
- 1608 William Thomas, of Caernarvon
- 1609 Thomas Bodvel, of Bodvel
- 1610 Robert Prichard, of Conway
- 1611 William Glynn, of Penllechog
- 1612 William Humphreys, of Pant Du
- 1613 William Vaughan, of Plas Hen
- 1614 Humphrey Meredith, of Clynog
- 1615 Griffith Hughes, of Cefn Llanfair
- 1616 William Griffith, of Caernarvon
- 1617 Simon William, of Weeg
- 1618 John Griffith, junior, of Llŷn
- 1619 John Wynne, of Penllech
- 1620 Robert Wynne, of Glascoed
- 1621 Robert Owen, of Ystum Cegid
- 1622 Thomas Glynn of Glynllifon
- 1623 John Bodvel, of Bodvel
- 1624 Ellis Brynkir, of Bryncir
- 1625 Richard Evans, of Elernion

=== Charles I ===
- 1625 Richard Evans, of Elernion
- 1626 Thomas Williams, of Vaenol
- 1627 Thomas Glyn, of Nantlli
- 1628 John Vaughan, of Pantglas
- 1629 Henry Humphreys, of Pwllheli
- 1630 John Bodurda, of Bodurda
- 1631 John Owen, of Clenennau
- 1632 William Vaughan, of Cors y Gedol
- 1633 Griffith Madryn, of Madryn
- 1634 William Glyn of Elernion
- 1635 John Wynne, of Conway
- 1636 Evan Wynne, of Saethon
- 1637 William Lewis Anwyl of Parc
- 1638 William Thomas, of Aber
- 1639 William Williams, of Vaenol, baronet
- 1640 William Hookes, of Conway
- 1641 James Brynkir, of Bryncir
- 1642 Thomas Cheadle, of Beaumaris
- 1643 Thomas Madryn, of Madryn
- 1644 Robert Jones, of Castellmarch
- 1645 Sir John Owen, of Clenenney
- 1646 Sir John Owen
- 1647 Thomas Williams, of Dinas
- 1648 William Lloyd, of Plas Hen

=== The Commonwealth ===
- 1649 Thomas Madryn, of Madryn
- 1649 John Carter, of Cyn Mael
- 1650 Sir Griffith Williams
- 1651: Henry Williams of Maes-y-Castell
- 1653: Sir Owen Wynn, 3rd Baronet, of Gwydir Castle, Llanrwst|
- 1654: Sir William Williams, 3rd Baronet
- 1655: Edward Williams of Wig
- 1656: William Vaughan of Plashern
- 1657: Richard Anwyl, of Hafodwrid
- 1658: Richard Wynn, of Gwydir Castle, Llanrwst
- 1659: John Williams, of Meillionydd

=== Charles II ===
- 1660: John Williams, of Meillionydd
- 1661: William Griffith of Cefnamlwch, Lleyn
- 1662: Sir Griffith Williams, 1st Baronet of Penrhyn
- 1663: Richard Cyffin, of Maenan
- 1664: Gruffudd Jones of Castellmarch
- 1665: Richard Glyn of Elernion
- 12 November 1665: Colonel Thomas Madryn, of Madryn, Llŷn
- 7 November 1666: Sir Roger Mostyn, 1st Baronet, of Mostyn Hall
- 6 November 1667: William Lloyd, of Bodfan
- 6 November 1668: John Glynn, of Glynllifon
- 11 November 1669: Sir Robert Williams, 2nd Baronet, of Penrhyn
- 1671: Ieuan "Llwyd" ap Humphrey "Wyn" of Hafodlwyfog
- 1672: William Wynn of Glanyrafon
- 1673: William Wynn, of Llanwrda
- 1673: Robert Williams
- 1674: William Griffith, of Madryn isaf
- 1675: Sir John Wynn, 5th Baronet of Wattstay
- 1676: Owen Wynne, of Ystymcedig
- 1676: Peter Pennant of Bychton
- 1676: Holland Williams
- 1677: Richard Wynn, of Glasinfryn
- 1678: Griffith Vaughan, of Plashen
- 1679: Thomas Wynn, of Glascoed
- 1680: William Lloyd, of Hafodlwyfog
- 1681: Edward Williams, Meillionydd
- 1682: William Arthur, Bangor
- 1683: George Twisleton, of Lleuar
- 1684: Robert Coytmor, of Tymawr

=== James II ===
- 1685: Love Parry, of Cefn Llanfair
- 1686: William Wynne
- 1687: Hugh Bodwrda
- 1688: Hon. Thomas Bulkeley of Dinas

=== William III ===
- 1689: Sir Thomas Mostyn
- 1689: Owen Wynne of Pen-y-Bryn
- 1690: Samuel Hanson of Bodvel
- 1691: Hugh Lewis of Pont Newydd
- 1692: John Rowland of Nant
- 1693: John Thomas of Aber
- 1694: Richard Madryn of Llanerch
- 1695: James Brynkir of Brynkir
- 1696: Richard Edwards of Nanhoran in Lleyn
- 1697: David Parry of Llwynynn
- 1698: Henry Vaughan of Pantglas
- 1699: Richard Vaughan of Plashen
- 1700: Pierce Lloyd of Llanidan
- 1701: Sir Roger Mostyn, 3rd Baronet of Mostyn Hall
- 1701: Edward Holland of Conwy

=== Anne ===
- 1702: Arthur Williams of Mellionydd
- 1703: Simon Fowkes of Bodvel
- 1704: Lloyd Bodvel of Bodvan (jointly with Griffith Wynn)
- 1705: Thomas Roberts of Brynneuadd
- 1706: Richard Owen of Peniarth
- 1707: Sir William Williams, 2nd Baronet of Llanforda, Oswestry
- 1708: Sir Griffith Williams, 6th Baronet of Marle
- 1709: George Coytmore, of Coytmor
- 1710: John Griffith, of Aber
- 1711: Roger Price
- 1712: Thomas Wynn, of Glynllifon and Bodfean Hall
- 1713: Huw Davies of Caerhun

=== George I ===
- 1714: Thomas Ellis, of Wern
- 1715: Timothy Edwards, Cefnmain
- 1716: Lewis Owen, of Peniarth
- 1717: John Wynn, of Melai
- 1718: William Wynne
- 1719: William Bodvell of Madryn
- 1720: Edward Baily, of Gorswen
- 1721: Hugh Lewis, Pontnewydd
- 1722: Love Parry, of Wernfawr
- 1723: Thomas Rowland, of Nant
- 1724: William Wynne, of Llanwrda
- 1725: William Brynkir, of Treborth
- 1726: Humphrey Roberts, Brynneuadd

=== George II ===
- 1727: Hugh Winne, of Waine
- 1728: William Wynn, of Llanfair
- 1729: Izacheus Hughes of Trevan
- 1730: Maurice Wynn, of Penybryn
- 1731: William Butler of Llysfan
- 1732: William Price of Penmorva
- 1733: John Wynn of Glynllifon
- 1734: John Griffith, of Caernarvon
- 1735: William Wynne
- 1736: Humphrey Owen, of Bodidda
- 1737: George Devereux of Sahone (Saython)
- 1738: Humphry Meredith, of Pengwern
- 1739: John Lloyd of Tyddynbychan
- 1740: Rice Williams, of Glanyrafan
- 1741: John Owen of Castlemay
- 1742: Hugh Williams of Pentir
- 1743: Edward Philip Pugh of Penrhyn
- 1744: William Brynker the younger of Brynker
- 1745: John Hoare of Conway
- 1746: William Thomas of Coedallen
- 1747: Robert Parry of Mellionen
- 1748: Christopher Butler of Llysffaen
- 1749: Charles Allanson of Vaenol
- 1750: Owen Holland of Conway
- 1751: Charles Evans of Treveilir, Anglesey
- 1752: John Lloyd of Porthyraur
- 1753: Owen Hughes of Trefan
- 1754: Hugh Davis of Carlum
- 1755: Richard Lloyd of Tal-y-bryn
- 1756: William Owen of Clenenney
- 1757: Robert Wynne of Llanerch
- 1758: Zacheus Jones of Aber y Pwll
- 1759: William Smith of Vaenol

=== George III ===
- 1760: Richard Lloyd of Tynewydd
- 1761: Robert Wynn of Farchwoll
- 1762: Hugh Hughes of Bodvan
- 1763: Love Parry of Waenfawr
- 1764: John Griffith of Garreglwyd, Anglesey
- 1765: John Griffith of Cefnamwlch
- 1766: Hugh Williams of Pentir
- 1767: Edward Lloyd of Pengwern
- 1768: Robert Howel Vaughan of Meillionydd
- 1769: Robert Godolphin Owen, of Clenenney
- 1770: William Archer of Llechan
- 1771: Rice Thomas of Coedhelen
- 1772: Richard Parry of Meillionen
- 1773: Ralph Griffith of Caerhun
- 1774: Thomas Assheton Smith of Vaynol
- 1775: Hugh Stoddart of Diganwy
- 1776: James Coytmor Pugh of Penrhyn
- 1777: Hugh Griffith of Brynodol
- 1778: John Rowlands of Bodaden
- 1779: Jeffery Prendergast of Marle
- 1780: Robert Lloyd of Gwnys and Tregaian
- 1781: Edward Carreg
- 1782: Richard Pennant
- 1783: Thomas Assheton Smith of Vaynol
- 1784: Robert Wynne of Llanerch
- 1785: John Jones, of Brynhir
- 1786: John Griffith of Tryfan
- 1787: John Lloyd of Gessel Gyfarch
- 1788: Henry Pritchard
- 1789: William Hughes, of Nantcall
- 1790: Robert Lloyd of Gesailgyfarch
- 1791: Richard Lloyd of Hendre fenws
- 1792: Edward Lloyd of Ty Mawr
- 1793: William Owen, of Pencraig (replacing Richard Lloyd)
- 1794: Richard Lloyd of Bronhaulog
- 1795: William Lloyd of Penmachno
- 1796: William John Lenthal of Bessels Leigh Manor, Berks
- 1797: Sir Edward Pryce Lloyd, 2nd Baronet of Pengwern Place
- 1798: Sir Thomas Mostyn, 6th Baronet of Gloddaeth Hall
- 1799: Evan Lloyd of Portyraur
- 5 February 1800: Evan Prichard, of Tynewydd
- 21 February 1800: Rice Edwards, of Porthyregwl
- 14 March 1800: Rowland Jones, of Weirglodd Fawr
- 11 February 1801: William Hervey, of Bodvel
- 3 February 1802: Robert William Wynne, of Llanerch
- 3 February 1803: Gwyllym Lloyd Wardle, of Wernfawr
- 1 February 1804: Owen Molyneux Wynne, of Penmachno
- 6 February 1805: Richard Garnons, of Pantdu
- 1 February 1806: William Williams, of Llangystennin
- 4 February 1807: Hugh Rowlands, of Bodaden
- 3 February 1808: Robert Thomas Carreg, of Carreg
- 6 February 1809: Thomas Parry Jones Parry, of Madryn
- 15 March 1809: William Griffith, of Bodegroes
- 31 January 1810: Humphrey Rowland Jones, of Ystumllyn
- 8 February 1811: Thomas Parry Jones-Parry, of Madryn
- 24 January 1812: Hon. Peter Robert Drummond-Burrell, of Gwydir
- 4 March 1812: George Thomas Smith, of Penydyffryn
- 10 February 1813: John Griffith, of Llanfair
- 4 February 1814: Charles Wynne Griffith Wynne, of Cefn Amwlch
- 13 February 1815: William Gryffydd Oakeley, of Bachysaint
- 1816: Thomas Burrowes of Benarth
- 1817: John Lloyd of Trallwyn
- 1818: Thomas Jones of Bryntirion
- 1819: George Hay Dawkins-Pennant of Penrhyn Castle

=== George IV ===
- 1820: William Ormsby-Gore of Clenenney
- 1821: Joseph Huddart, of Brynker
- 1822: William Lloyd Caldecot, of the Cottage
- 1823: William Turner, of Parkia, Criccieth
- 1824: Sir David Erskine, 1st Baronet of Plas Isa
- 1825: Henry Davies Griffith of Caerhun
- 1826: Kyffin John William Lenthall of Maenan
- 1827: William Glyn Griffith of Bodegroes
- 1828: R. Watkin Price of Bron-y-gader
- 1829: Thomas Lloyd, of Glangwna, died and replaced by Daniel Vaudrey, of Plasgwynant

=== William IV ===
- 1830: John Williams, of Bryntirion
- 1831: Rice Thomas, of Codehelen
- 1832: John Rowlands, of Plas-tirion
- 1833: David Price Downes, of Hendre-rhys-gethin
- 1834: Richard Lloyd Edwards, of Nanhoron
- 1835: John Morgan, of Weeg
- 1836: Thomas Parry Jones Parry, of Aber-du-nant
- 1837: Hon. Thomas Pryce Lloyd, of Plashen

=== Victoria ===
- 1838: Sir Richard Bulkeley Williams-Bulkeley, 10th Baronet, of Plas-y-nant
- 1839: John Williams, of Hendregadno
- 1840: Edward Lloyd-Mostyn, 2nd Baron Mostyn, of Plas Hên
- 1841: David White Griffith, of Hafodydd-Brithion
- 1842: John Griffith Watkins, of Plas Llanfair
- 1843: David Jones, of Bodfan
- 1844–1845: John Price, of Garth y Glo
- 1846: Charles Henry Evans, of Pontnewydd
- 1847: Thomas Wright, of Derwenfawr
- 1848: George Augustus Huddart, of Brynkir
- 1849: Samuel Owen Priestley, of Trefan
- 1850: Isaac Walker, of Hendre-gadredd
- 1851: John Williams, of Hafodyllan
- 1852: Martin Williams, of Penamser, was initially appointed, but was replaced by George Hammond Whalley, of Plas Madoc, Ruabon
- 1853: Robert Vaughan Wynne Williams, of Llandudno
- 1854: Sir Thomas Duncombe Love Jones-Parry, 1st Baronet, of Madryn Castle, Nefyn
- 1855: Samuel Dukinfield Darbishire, of Pendyffryn
- 1856: John MacDonald, of Plas-ucha-Dwygyfylchwy
- 1857: James Edwards, of Benarth
- 1858: John Nanney, of Maesyneuadd
- 1859: John Lloyd Jones, of Broom Hall
- 1860: John Whitehead Greaves, of Tanyrallt
- 1861: Henry McKellar, of Sygunfawr
- 1862: David Williams, of Castle Deudraeth
- 1863: John Platt, of Bryn-y-neuadd
- 1864: Griffith Humphreys Owen, of Ymwlch
- 1865: Charles Millar, of Penrhos
- 1866: John Dicken Whitehead, of Glangwna
- 1867: Abram Jones Williams, of Gelliwig
- 1868: Robert Sorton Parry, of Tan-y-Graig
- 1869: Rice William Thomas, of Coed Helen
- 1870: Hugh John Ellis-Nanney, of Plas-ben
- 1871: John Griffith Wynn Griffith, of Llanfair
- 1872: Owen Evans, of Broom Hall
- 1873: Thomas Turner, of Plasbrereton
- 1874: Benjamin Thomas Ellis, of Rhyllech
- 1875: Edward Griffith Powell, of Coedmawr
- 1876: Robert Carreg, of Carreg
- 1877: Henry Platt, of Gorddinog
- 1878: George William Duff Assheton Smith, of Vaynol
- 1879: Henry Kneeshaw, of Tanyfoel, Penmaenmawr
- 1880: Francis William Lloyd Edwards, Nanhoron
- 1881: Charles Arthur Wynne Finch, Y Foelas, Pentrefoelas
- 1882: Joseph Evans, Glyn
- 1883: John Owen, Tŷ Coch
- 1884: Albert Wood, Bodlondeb
- 1885: John Ernest Greaves, of Plas Hen
- 1886: Sir Llewellyn Turner, of Parkia, Criccieth
- 1887: Francis William Alexander Roche of Portmadoc
- 1888: Sydney Platt of Bryn-y-neuadd, Llanfairfechan
- 1889: Edward Brooke, of Conwy
- 1890: William Bostock, of Colwyn Bay
- 1891: Thomas Barker, of Plas Gogarth, Llandudno
- 1892: Joseph Broome, of Sunny Hill, Llandudno
- 1893: Charles Frost, of Minydon, Colwyn
- 1894: Frederick George Wynn of Glynllifon Park, Caernarfon
- 1895: John Albert Alexander Williams of Aberglaslyn Hall, Beddgelert
- 1896: Richard Methuen Greaves of Wern, Porthmadog
- 1897: Lloyd Warren George Hughes of Coedhelen, Carnarvon
- 1898: George Farren of Trefenai, Carnarvon
- 1899: John Robinson of Talysarn
- 1900: Thomas Lewis of Gartherwen, Bangor

=== Edward VII ===
- 1901: Lieutenant-Colonel Owen Lloyd Jones Evans, of Broomhall, Chwilog
- 1902: Ephraim Wood, of Pabo Hall, Conwy
- 1903: Frank Stewart Barnard, of Bryn Bras Castle
- 1904: Lt.-Colonel Llewellyn England Sydney Parry, of Stainsford House, Dorchester
- 1905: John Issard Davies, of Llysmeirion, Caernarvon
- 1906: Francis John Lloyd Priestley of Ymwlch, Criccieth
- 1907: Sir Owen Roberts, of Dinas, Caernarfon
- 1908: Charles Garden Assheton-Smith, of Vaynol Park, Bangor
- 1909: Owen Jones, of Glanbeuno, Caernarvon
- 1910: David Pierce Williams, of Vrondinas, near Carnarvon

=== George V ===
- 1911: Thomas Edwards Roberts, of Plas-y-Bryn, near Carnarvon
- 1912: John Evan Roberts, of Brynmar, Bangor
- 1913: Thomas Roberts of Maesygroes, near Bangor
- 1914: Thomas Rowland Hughes
- 1915: Joseph Wallis Goddard
- 1916: Ernest Albert Neele, of Plas Dinorwic, Port Dinorwic
- 1917: Sir Frederick Henry Smith, 1st Baronet of Queen's Lodge, Colwyn Bay
- 1918: David Thomas Lake, of Highfield, Carnarvon
- 1919: Lewis Rivett of Marine Crescent, Deganwy
- 1920: Thomas Frederick Tattersall
- 1921: Major John Robert Williams of Ardre, Penmaenmawr
- 1922: William Malesbury Letts
- 1923: Charles William Keighley
- 1924: Robert Gwyneddon Davies of " Gradanfryn," Llanwnda
- 1925: Albert Henry Mallalieu
- 1926: John Robert Collie, of "Bryn Rhedyn", Conway
- 1927: Griffith Hughes Roberts, of Glanrhyd, Edeyrn
- 1928: Henry Pratt, of Bron Derw, Penrhyn Bay, near Llandudno
- 1929: Sir Robert Armstrong-Jones
- 1930: Watkin Williams
- 1931: Duncan Elliott Alves, of Bryn Bras Castle, Caernarvon
- 1932: Sir Michael Robert Vivian Duff-Assheton-Smith, Bt, of Vaynol Park, Bangor
- 1933: Richard Elias Pritchard
- 1934: Frank Charles Minoprio
- 1935: Owen Cadwaladr Roberts, of York House, Stanmore, Middlesex and Ael y Bryn, Llanrhos Road, Deganwy
- 1936: Ronald Owen Lloyd Armstrong-Jones

=== George VI ===
- 1937: Herbert Wood, of The Cottage, Sylva Gardens South, Llandudno and Green Royd, Brighouse
- 1938: Thomas William Pierce, of Quellyn, Caernarvon
- 1939: John Thomas, of Cefn, Llanengan, Abersoch and Mollington Road, Wallasey, Cheshire
- 1940: Eldred Owen Roberts, of Plasybryn, Bontnewydd, Caernarvon, and Old Forge Close, Stanmore, Middlesex
- 1941: David Lewis Jones
- 1942: Griffith Ivor Evans of Bryn Teg, Caernarvon
- 1943: Samuel Victor Beer
- 1944: William Penry Williams of Ty Coch, Caernarvon
- 1945: Lieut.-Colonel William Hilton Parry, of Ty Newydd, Caernarvon
- 1946: George Brymer, of Meifod, Bontnewydd, Caernarvon
- 1947: Emyr Wyn Jones of Llety'r Eos Llanfairtalhaearn and of Seibiant, Pontllyfni
- 1948: David Allen Bryan of The Gables, Penmaenmawr
- 1949: Owen Percy Griffith of Berwyn, Caernarvon
- 1950: Lady Margaret Gladwyn Goronwy Owen, of Llwynybrain, Llanrug
- 1951: Henry Humphries Jones of Cefn-y-Coed, Roewen, Conway, and of Menlove Avenue, Liverpool
- 1952: Rev. William Pierce Owen of Ffridd, Nantlle

=== Elizabeth II ===
- 1953: Joseph Thomas Jones of Bryn Arfon, Woodlands, Conway.
- 1954: Alfred Reginald Chadwick Huntington, of Carreg Bran, Llanfairpwll.
- 1955: Dr Robert Alun-Roberts, of Hafod-y-Coed, Victoria Drive, Bangor.
- 1956: Hugh Morris Roberts of Barclays Bank House, Aberystwyth and Bronygaer, South Road, Caernarvon
- 1957: Pyrs William Morris of Glanbeuno, Bontnewydd
- 1958: Dr Robert Hughes Parry of Cefniwrch, Criccieth
- 1959: Alderman William Hugheston-Roberts of Ty Gwyn, Tremadoc
- 1960: Dr Gwilym ap Vychan Jones of Y Betws, Portdinorwic
- 1961: Dr Robert Rees Prytherch of Plas Newydd, Criccieth
- 1962: George Trevor Brymer of Meifod, Bontnewydd
- 1963: Edward Samuel Evans of Plas Hendre, Cwm Pennant, Garn, Dolbenmaen
- 1964: William Trefor Matthews of Bryn Teg, Caernarvon
- 1965: Roger Clough-Williams-Ellis of Glasfryn, near Pwllheli
- 1966: Christopher Baskin Briggs, of Pen-y-Gwryd, Nantgwynant
- 1967: Professor David Richard Seaborne Davies of Y Garn, Pwllheli.
- 1968: Sir Reginald Lawrence William Williams, 7th Baronet, of Penrhos, Caeathraw
- 1969: Evan Wynne Jones of Madryn, Llanfairfechan
- 1970: John Francis Humphreys Jones of Llwyn y Brain, Llanrug
- 1971: Major James Richard Edwards Harden, of Nanhoran, Pwllheli
- 1972: Edward Jones of Y Garn, Conway Old Road, Penmaenmawr
- 1973: Alwyn Hughes-Jones of Bodarfryn, Groeslon
- 1974 onwards: see High Sheriff of Gwynedd
