= Glynne baronets =

Extinct baronetcy in the Baronetage of England

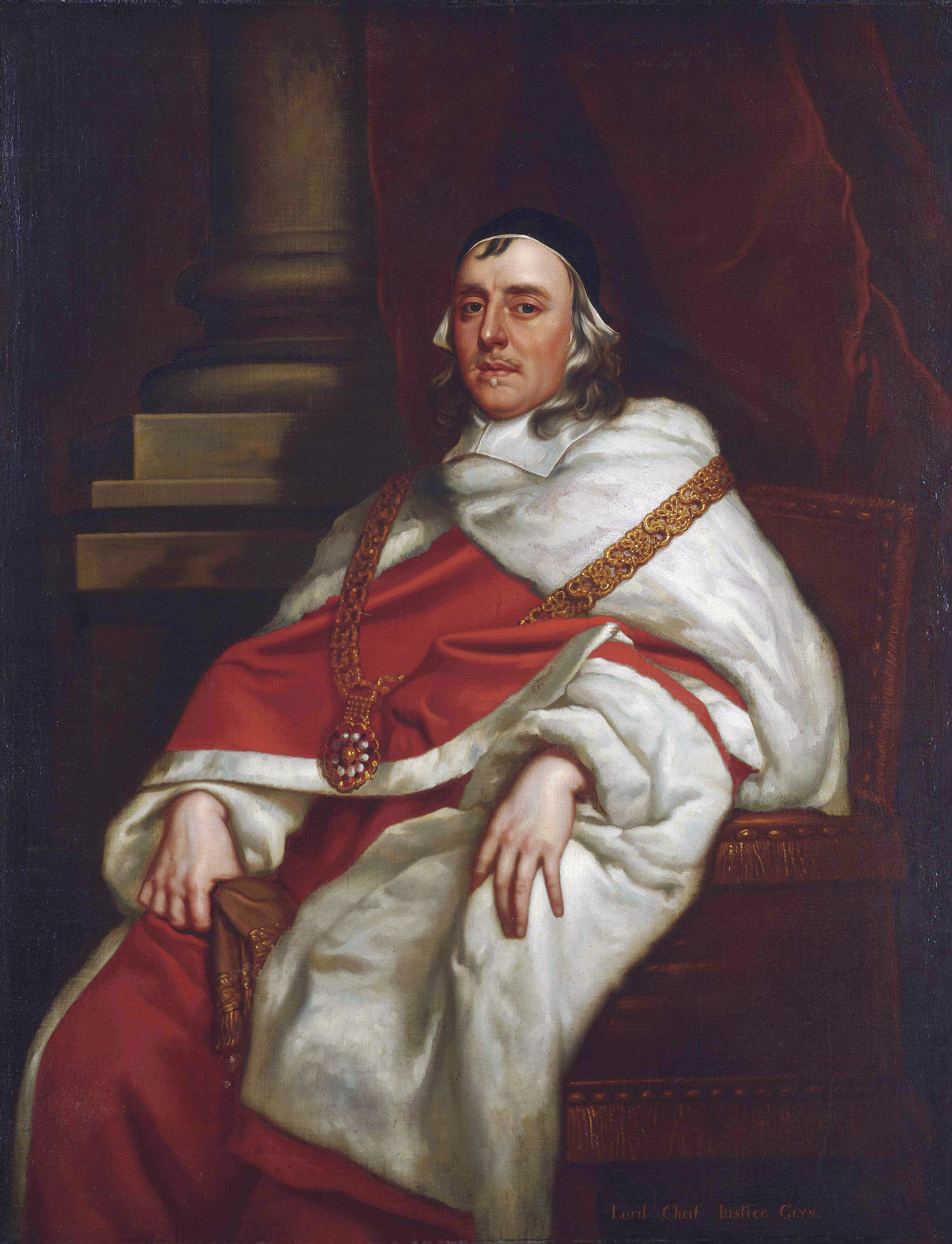
Sir John Glynne, ancestor of the Glynne baronets

The Glynne Baronetcy, of Bicester in the County of Oxford, was a title in the Baronetage of England. It was created on 20 May 1661 for William Glynne, the former Member of Parliament for Carnarvon. He was the son of Sir John Glynne, Lord Chief Justice during the Commonwealth. The second Baronet sat as Member of Parliament for Oxford University and Woodstock. The sixth Baronet was Member of Parliament for Flintshire and Flint. The title became extinct on the death in 1874 of Sir Stephen Glynne, 9th Baronet. The family estates, including Hawarden Castle in Flintshire, had been rescued from bankruptcy by the wealth of Sir John Gladstone, whose son William Ewart Gladstone (the Liberal prime minister) had married the ninth Baronet's sister Catherine; on his death, they passed to Catherine and William's eldest son William Henry Gladstone.

== Glynne baronets, of Bisseter (1661) ==
- Sir William Glynne, 1st Baronet (1638–1690)
- Sir William Glynne, 2nd Baronet (1663–1721)
- Sir Stephen Glynne, 3rd Baronet (7 February 1665 – 29 April 1729). Glynne married Sophia Evelyn (his sister-in-law), by whom he had three sons, the 4th, 5th, and 6th Baronets.
- Sir Stephen Glynne, 4th Baronet (c. 1696 – September 1729)
- Sir William Glynne, 5th Baronet (c. 1710 – August 1730). Glynne died unmarried at Aix-la-Chapelle.
- Sir John Glynne, 6th Baronet (1712–1777)
- Sir Stephen Glynne, 7th Baronet (12 May 1744 – 1 April 1780). Glynne was educated at Queen's College, Oxford and took holy orders, becoming rector of Hawarden. He married Mary Bennett in 1779, and died of a ruptured blood vessel while hunting the next year.
- Sir Stephen Richard Glynne, 8th Baronet (May 1780 – 5 March 1815). Glynne was the posthumous son of the 7th Baronet. He was educated at Eton and Christ Church, Oxford. Sir Stephen was an amateur architect and an agriculturalist. In 1806, he married Mary Griffin, daughter of Lord Braybrooke. He died at Nice in 1815 and was succeeded by his son Stephen.
- Sir Stephen Richard Glynne, 9th Baronet (1807–1874)
