= Sir Richard Wynn, 2nd Baronet =

Welsh courtier and politician

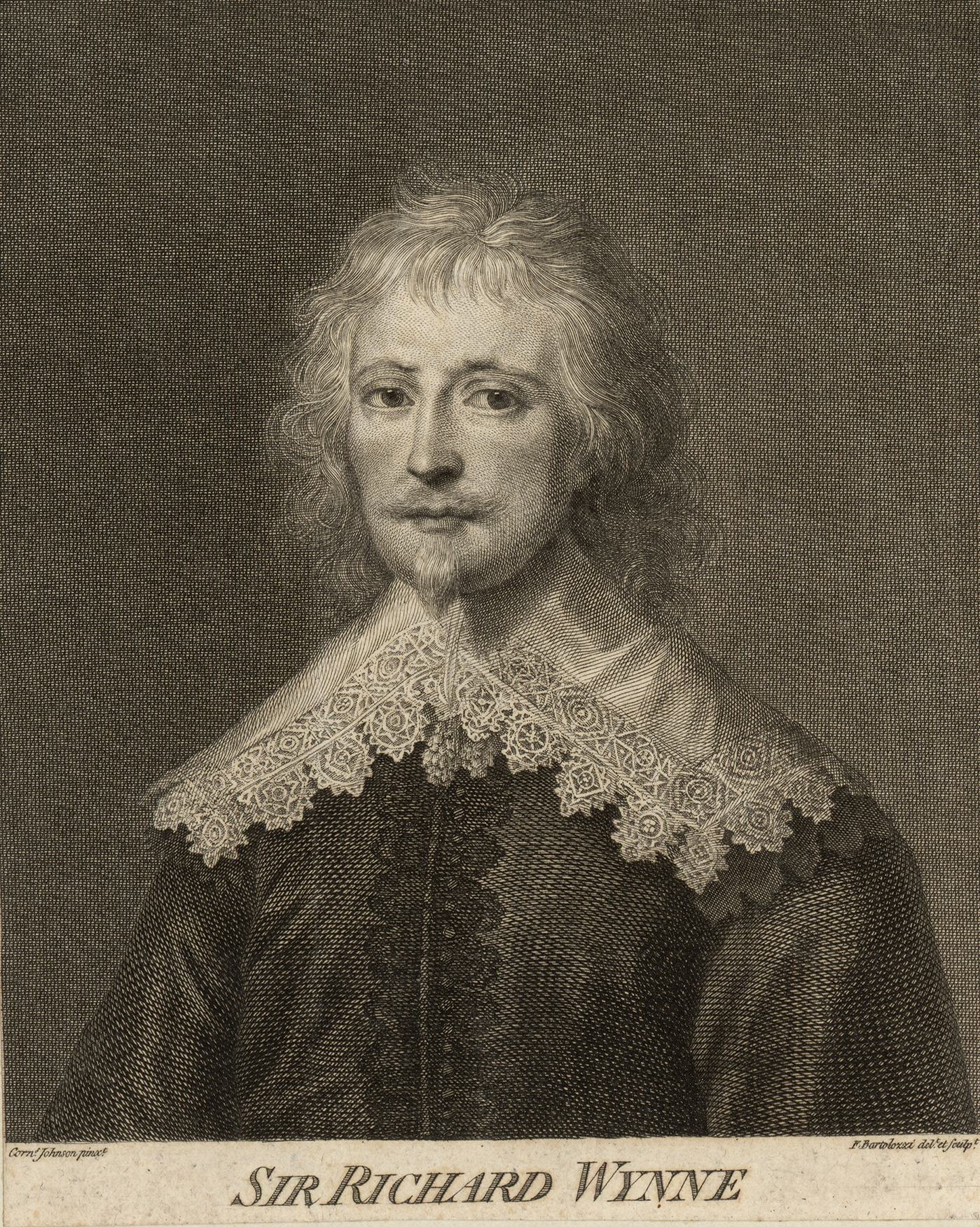
Sir Richard Portrait

Sir Richard Wynn, 2nd Baronet (1588 – 19 July 1649) was a Welsh courtier and politician who sat in the House of Commons at various times between 1614 and 1649.

== Biography ==
Wynn was the second and eldest surviving son of Sir John Wynn, 1st Baronet, and his wife Sidney, daughter of William Gerard, Lord Chancellor of Ireland. He was a Member of Parliament for Caernarvonshire in 1614. He was Groom of the Bedchamber to Charles, Prince of Wales, from 1617 to 1625. He unsuccessfully contested Caernarvonshire in 1621 but in the same election he returned as MP for Ilchester.

Wynn accompanied Prince Charles on his voyage to Spain in 1623 and wrote an account of the journey, published by Thomas Hearne in 1729. He describes the costumes of Spanish country people and aristocrats. In 1625, he was elected MP for Ilchester again. He was also appointed treasurer to Queen Henrietta Maria. He inherited the baronetcy after the death of his father in 1627. In 1629, he was once again groom of the bedchamber to Charles (now crowned King Charles I) and Henrietta Maria. He established the Gwydir chapel in Llanrwst church and had a bridge built over the River Conwy in 1633.

In April 1640, Wynn was elected MP for Andover, for Newton and for Bodmin in the Short Parliament and chose to sit for Andover. He was elected MP for Liverpool for the Long Parliament in November 1640. He sat in parliament until 1648 when he was excluded under Pride's Purge and died a few months later in 1649.

He married Anne, daughter of Sir Francis D'Arcy of Isleworth and Katherine Legh, but had no issue. The baronetcy passed to his brother Owen.

== Notes ==
Parliament of England
Preceded by Sir William Maurice	Member of Parliament for Caernarvonshire; 1614	Succeeded by John Griffith
Preceded by Right to return Members restored in 1621	Member of Parliament for Ilchester; 1621–1625; With: Arthur Jarvis 1621–22; Edmund Waller 1624–25; Sir Robert Gorges 1625	Succeeded by Sir William Beecher; Robert Caesar
Vacant Parliament suspended since 1629	Member of Parliament for Andover; 1640; With: Robert Wallop	Succeeded by Robert Wallop; Sir Henry Rainsford
Preceded by Lord Cranfield; John Holcroft	Member of Parliament for Liverpool; 1640–1648; With: John Moore	Succeeded by Thomas Birch; John Moore
Honorary titles
Preceded by Sir John Wynn	Custos Rotulorum of Caernarvonshire; 1627–1646	Vacant Interregnum Title next held by Sir Richard Wynn, Bt
Baronetage of England
Preceded by John Wynn	Baronet (of Gwydir); 1626–1649	Succeeded by Owen Wynn
