= Madryn (disambiguation) =

Puerto Madryn is a city in the province of Chubut in Argentine Patagonia.

Madryn may also refer to:

- Saint Materiana (born c. 440), Welsh saint
- Thomas Madryn (fl. 1654), Welsh politician

== See also ==
- Madron, Cornwall, Great Britain
