= Custos Rotulorum of Caernarvonshire =

Civic post in Caernarvonshire, Wales

This is a list of people who have served as Custos Rotulorum of Caernarvonshire.

- Sir Richard Bulkeley c. 1544
- John "Wynn" ap Maredudd bef. 1550–1559
- Maurice Wynn bef. 1562 – aft. 1577
- Robert Dudley, 1st Earl of Leicester bef. 1579–1588
- William Maurice bef. 1594–1596
- Sir Thomas Mostyn 1596–1618
- Sir John Wynn, 1st Baronet 1618–1627
- Sir Richard Wynn, 2nd Baronet 1627–1646
- Interregnum
- Sir Richard Wynn, 4th Baronet 1660–1674
- Richard Bulkeley, 3rd Viscount Bulkeley 1679–1689
- Lord Edward Russell 1689–1714
- Peregrine Bertie, 2nd Duke of Ancaster and Kesteven 1714–1739
- Sir William Yonge, 4th Baronet 1739–1755
- Sir John Wynn, 2nd Baronet 1756–1773
- Thomas Wynn, 1st Baron Newborough 1773–1781

For later custodes rotulorum, see Lord Lieutenant of Caernarvonshire.
