= Sir William Glynne, 1st Baronet =

Welsh politician

Sir William Glynne, 1st Baronet (20 January 1638 – 8 September 1690) was a Welsh politician.

William was the son of Sir John Glynne, the Lord Chief Justice during the Commonwealth. He was educated at Jesus College, Oxford, taking his degree in 1656, and represented Caernarfon in the Third Protectorate Parliament. Both Sir John and his son went over to the cause of Charles II at the Restoration. William was again returned for Caernarfon during the Convention Parliament, and was subsequently created a baronet, of Bisseter, Oxfordshire, on 20 May 1661. He was selected High Sheriff of Oxfordshire for 1668.

In 1666, Sir William inherited the estate of Hawarden Castle, Flintshire from his father, and served as High Sheriff of Flintshire in 1673. He was deputy lieutenant for Oxfordshire from 1688 to his death and for Caernarvonshire from 1689 to his death.

By his wife Penelope Anderson, Glynne had two surviving sons and two daughters. The sons were:

- Sir William Glynne, 2nd Baronet (1663–1721)
- Sir Stephen Glynne, 3rd Baronet (1665–1729)

Parliament of England
Preceded by Robert Williams	Member of Parliament for Caernarfon; 1660–1661	Succeeded by William Griffith
Baronetage of England
New title	Baronet (of Bisseter, Oxfordshire); 1661–1690	Succeeded by William Glynne
