= Twm Siôn Cati =

Welsh folklore figure

- A statue of Twm Siôn Cati in Tregaron
- Born: August 1532; Tregaron, Wales
- Died: 1609
- Other name: Thomas Jones
- Occupations: poet, genealogist, artist; outlaw
- Spouse: Joan Devereux (née Price)
- Relatives: John Dee

Twm Siôn Cati is a prominent figure in Welsh folklore. While many tales of cunning and trickery have been associated with Twm, he is also said to have been a respected antiquary, genealogist and poet and to have risen to the position of magistrate and mayor of Brecon as well as being a relative of the occultist John Dee.

Due to legends of Twm stealing from the rich and powerful and helping the poor and needy, he became known in the 19th century as "The Welsh Robin Hood" and "The Welsh Rob Roy".

== Historicity ==
The character of Twm Siôn Cati is based on a real person named Thomas Jones (1532–1609). Jones was said to be a landowner, an antiquary, genealogist and bard, whose manuscripts are kept at the National Library of Wales. He is also recorded as marrying Joan, the daughter of John Price an advisor to Thomas Cromwell during the dissolution of the monasteries. Price was also an antiquarian and a collector of rare Welsh documents, such as the Black Book of Carmarthen. Jones is said to have been a steward who "often had recourse to the law". He is also said to have been pardoned of his offences in 1559, being named as "Thomas Johns alias Catty".

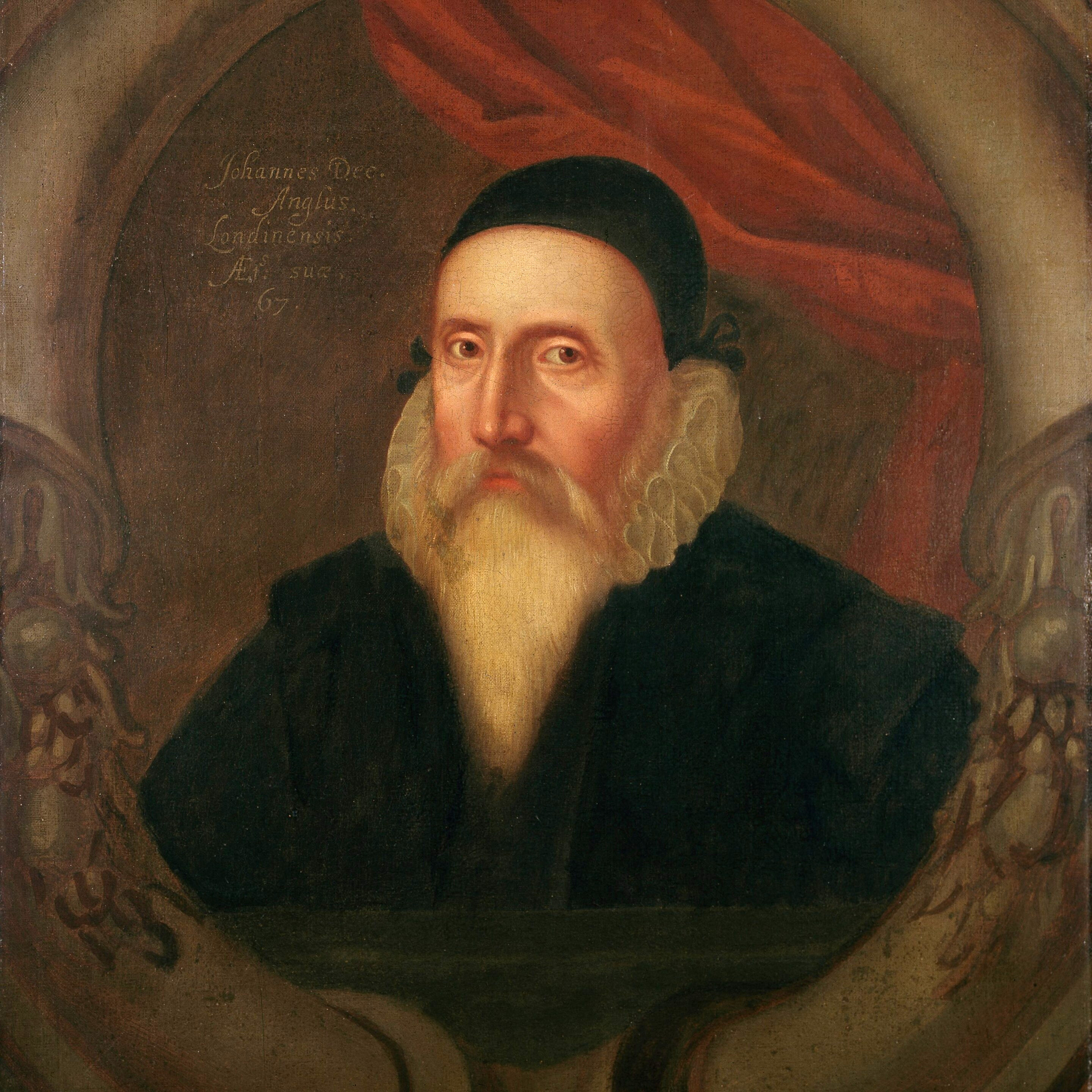
John Dee corresponded with Thomas Jones, who visited Dee at London and Mortlake. This Thomas Jones has been suggested as the historic Twm Siôn Cati.

Various manuscripts ascribed to Thomas Jones begin around 1570 and he is known to have assisted George Owen of Henllys and Lewys Dwnn and the officers of the Heralds College. Thomas Jones is known to have visited Dee in London in 1590 and at his home in Mortlake six years later, the two also corresponded with each other in 1597 in which Dee referred to him as "my cousin". Jones was also steward of Caron in 1601 and died in 1609, when his will was proved at Carmarthen.

In spite of the historical evidence however, it is considered unlikely that the numerous tales attributed to Twm Siôn Cati were the exploits of this one man. It has been suggested that the exploits attributed to this one figure were originally associated with a number of raiders and highwaymen who operated in Wales during this time, possibly with similar or identical names to that of Thomas Jones.

== Biography ==
=== Early life ===
Twm was born at Porth y Ffynnon on the outskirts of Tregaron, with his relative, John Dee recorded Twm's date of birth as either 1 or 10 August 1532.

His mother was Cati Jones of Tregaron, with his father sometimes stated to be Siôn ap Dafydd ap Madog ap Hywel Moetheu of Porth-y-ffin, Tregaron. Following Welsh naming conventions, Twm took his father's name as a patronym, but also his mother's name, becoming known as Twm Siôn Cati in Welsh. This, together with the paucity of written records for Twm's birth and early childhood, has led to many depictions Twm as an illegitimate child, such as in Thomas Jeffery Llewelyn Prichard's 1828 work, The Adventures and Vagaries of Twm Shon Catti where Twm is the illegitimate son of Cati Jones following attentions from John "Wynn" ap Maredudd of Gwydir.

=== Robber and exile ===
In the tale told by Llewelyn Prichard, he grows up in Tregaron and after a spell working for a farmer, he works for a local landowner. He is trusted to take a large sum of the squire's money to England. The journey is fraught with encounters with highwaymen, footpads, and villains, all of whom Twm is able to best.

George Borrow disapproved of the veneer of respectability in Prichard's book: "Its grand fault is endeavouring to invest Twm Shon (a name Borrow spells with varying consistency) with a character of honesty, and to make his exploits appear rather those of a wild young waggish fellow than of a robber." According to the stories which Borrow picked up around Tregaron, Twm's career was more straightforward. "Between eighteen and nineteen, in order to free himself and his mother from poverty which they had long endured, he adopted the profession of a thief, and soon became celebrated through the whole of Wales for the cleverness and adroitness which he exercised in his calling".

He was supposedly a Protestant by faith at a time when Mary I of England, a Catholic monarch, ruled and he had to gain an income as best he could, choosing robbery as his trade as his religion had him marked out as a rebel already and his low status meant that he could not rely on any advantage or protection from others. As a young man he fled to Geneva in 1557 to escape the law. After the accession of the Protestant Queen Elizabeth I, he was able to obtain a pardon for his thievery, enabling his return to Wales in 1559.

=== Marriages and children ===
Twm was active in west Wales, with forays into England, in the late sixteenth century. Stories centre on his tricks, with which he outwitted law-abiding people and criminals alike.

In the tale told by Llewelyn Prichard, Twm woos and eventually marries the Lady of Ystrad-ffin and subsequently becomes a magistrate and mayor of Brecon.

The name of his first wife is unknown; his second, whom he married in 1607, was Joan, widow of Thomas Williams of Ystrad-ffin and daughter of Sir John Price of Brecon Priory (1502?-1555).

It is rumoured that Twm had a number of illegitimate children during his time as a highway man. To hide the true identity of their father, the children were given religious or biblical surnames.

== Legends ==
Borrow recounted a story in which a farmer is hunting Twm over the theft of a bullock. The farmer reaches Twm's mother's house and asks whether Twm Shone Catti (another of Borrow's spellings) lives there. A beggar answers that he does, and agrees to hold the farmer's horse and whip for him. As the farmer goes into the house, the beggar jumps onto the horse: it is Twm. He gallops to the house of the farmer and tells the farmer's wife that the farmer is in trouble, needs money urgently, and has sent Twm to fetch it, with the horse and whip to prove that the message really came from the farmer. The farmer's wife pays up. Twm, now in possession of the farmer's money and horse, hastily departs for London, later selling the horse.

A tale recounted by Meyrick recalls how Twm was asked by a poor man to steal a pitcher for him. They went together to a merchant where Twm started belittling the man's wares. Having told his friend secretly to take the pitcher of his choice, Twm distracted the merchant by telling him there was a hole in one of the pitchers, which the man denied. Twm desired him to put his hand in the pitcher to test it and the man still denied there was a hole. Twm then asked him how, if there was no hole, could he have put his hand inside? By this time his friend had disappeared with his pitcher, undetected.

A tale from Prichard's book involves an occasion when Twm is staying in an inn overnight and realises other people are planning to rob him the following day after he sets off. He has a large sum of money with him. The following morning he behaves as though his money is in the pack-saddle of his horse. When the highwayman catches up, Twm drops the saddle in the middle of a pool. The highwayman wades into the pool to fetch it. Twm takes the opportunity to make off with the highwayman's horse. A complication arises because the horse responds to the voice of the highwayman crying "Stop!" Luckily Twm, in terror, happens to shout a word which makes the horse gallop on again, and he is conveyed to safety.

Another tale recounts how Twm waylaid a rich squire, who was accompanied by his daughter, Twm was so smitten with her that he returned her jewellery to her and attempted to woo her, against her father's opposition and, initially, her own. One full moon shortly after the robbery, he crept to her window, roused her from sleep, caught her hand at the window and kissed it, refusing to let her go until she promised to marry him. She wouldn't promise so Twm drew his dagger, drew blood on her wrist and threatened to sever her hand unless she assented to marriage forthwith. She agreed to marry him and she kept her hand. Their marriage followed soon after, despite her father's views and the directness of Twm's courtship methods. The girl was supposedly the widow of the sheriff of Carmarthen. Through this marriage Twm is supposed to have gained respectability, eventually becoming a justice of the peace, sitting in judgement on others, a position he held until his death aged 79.

== Literature ==
Francis Abel William Taylor Armstrong painting "Twm Shon Catti's Country"

It is likely that a corpus of oral tales had existed for some time before the eighteenth century, when the character begins to appear in literature. There are a number of similarities between the legends of Twm Siôn Cati and the lead character of Henry Fielding' 1749 novel, The History of Tom Jones, a Foundling. These include the circumstances of his birth, a noble father, a bucolic setting in the "far west", romantic liaisons followed by the meeting and wooing of a lady, exile from their home country, a rags-to-riches narrative structure and even the character's names (Thomas Jones).

English-language pamphlet, Tomshone Catty's Tricks was printed in 1763. However, it wasn't until the early nineteenth century that Twm became a feature of literary works. Another pamphlet, Y Digrifwr was published in 1811. Which was subtitled as "The jokester: a collection of feats and tricks of Thomas Jones of Tregaron, Cardiganshire, he who is generally known under the name Twm Sion Catti". The journalist William Frederick Deacon dedicated a chapter of his 1823 work, The Innkeeper’s Album to "Twm John Catty: The Welch Rob Roy". While the collection is of South Wales folklore, the chapter title was a clear attempt to copy Sir Walter Scott's success in repurposing the Scottish hero for nineteenth century British readers. (Henry M. Milner adapted Deacon's piece for the stage under the same title; it premiered at the Royal Coburg Theatre on 24 April 1823.)

This was soon followed in 1828 by the initial publication of TJ Llewelyn Prichard's The Adventures and Vagaries of Twm Shon Catti, descriptive of Life in Wales.

George Borrow, walking through Wild Wales in 1854, heard several tales about Twm from a fellow-walker on the way to Tregaron and later read what was probably Prichard's book. This verse shows how much fear the local residents had of him:

There is a great cheer and shout in Ystrad-ffin this year, And the snakestones melt into lead By the osom of Twm Siôn Cati.

H. Parry-Williams (ed.), Old Penitentiary (The Welsh Book Club, 1940), pgs. 159.

T. Llew Jones has published three Welsh-language novels about him namely Y Ffordd Dangerous, Amongst Thieves and Dial at Last.

== Television ==
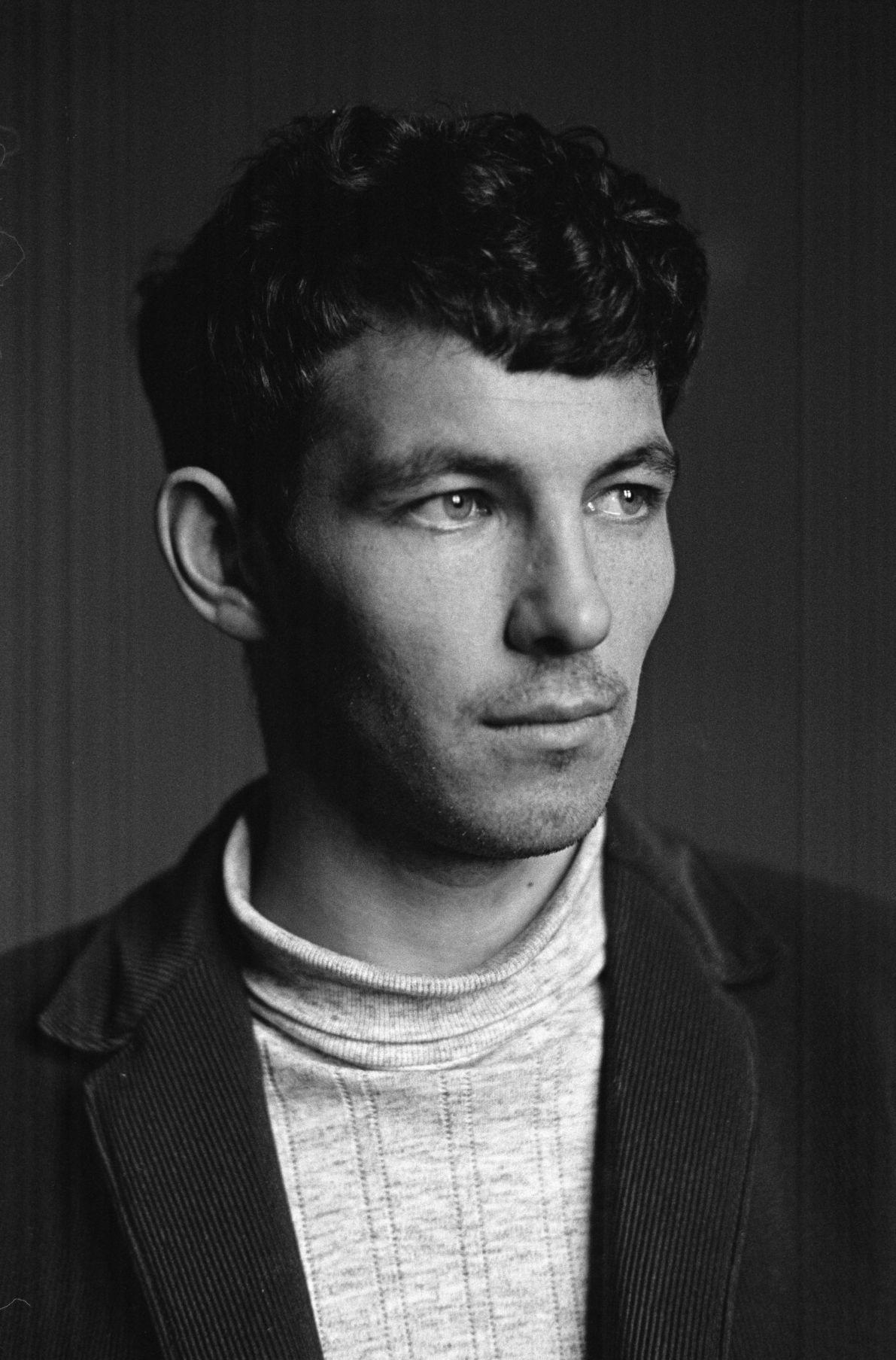
Welsh actor John Ogwen portrayed Twm in the 1978 BBC drama Hawkmoor

The 1978 BBC drama Hawkmoor is based on the activities of Twm Siôn Cati. Created by Lynn Hughes and starring John Ogwen as Twm and Jane Asher as Lady Johane Williams, the drama depicted Twm as a Welsh freedom fighter protecting Welsh people from the repression of the English Sheriff John Stedman (Jack May) and the cruel (Catholic) Vicar Davyd (Philip Madoc).

A paperback (ISBN 0-14-004501-5) also written by Lynn Hughes was released in the same year to accompany the television series.

== Landscape ==
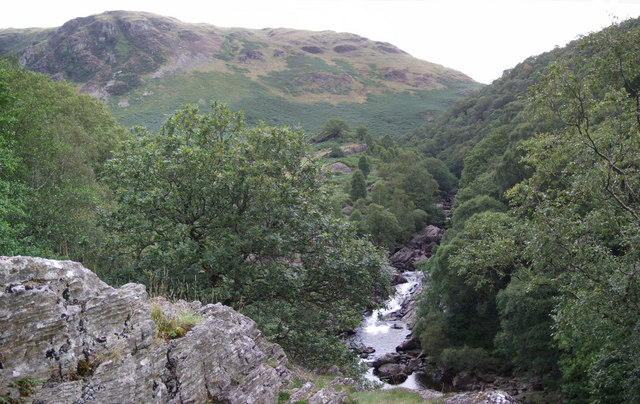
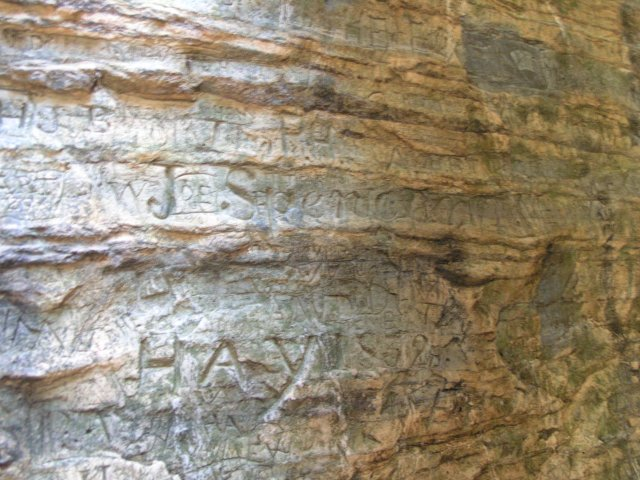
The Afon Tywi passes below Twm Siôn Cati's Cave which is hidden on the tree lined slopes, high up on the right bank. The inside of the cave features much nineteenth century graffiti.

A number of areas have been associated with Twm Siôn Cati's hideouts, including two caves, one on the outskirts of Tregaron at Ystrad-ffin and another at Rhandir-mwyn near Llandovery.

Twm Siôn Cati's Cave at Ystrad-ffin became popular with nineteenth century tourists, wishing to trace the footsteps of Twm who was said to have hidden in the cave while wooing Joan (the widow of Ystrad-ffin), and again when escaping from Llandovery fair.

There is a steep ascent to the cave, which is surrounded by trees and boulders, and it is necessary to crawl inside. Part of the cave roof has collapsed but the cave itself has obviously been visited over many years, as evidenced by the carvings – one reads 1832. It overlooks the confluence of the River Tywi with the River Pysgotwr. The Oxford Companion to the Literature of Wales notes that Prichard's vivid descriptions of Twm's cave suggest the author knew the area around Rhandir-mwyn well. Historical accounts have been published by Lynne Hughes (whose book Hawkmoor, was serialised by the BBC in 1977) and three by Welsh-language children's author T. Llew Jones.

Today, the cave is part of the Gwenffrwd-Dinas RSPB reserve.

== Festivals ==
The community of Tregaron held a year of activities to commemorate the 400th anniversary of the death of Twm Siôn Cati in 2009. The year saw activities such as an exhibition at Tregaron Kite Centre (the red kite is common in the area), a charity walk from his cave to his birthplace and the launching of four books. Local artists created souvenir items. A wood-carving of Twm created by Grace Young Monaghan was placed on Tregaron Square.

An international Twm Siôn Cati Day is held each 17 May. A Twm Siôn Cati Community Prize is presented annually to a Tregaron Primary School pupil for doing a good deed in Tregaron. A Twm Town Trail, designed by the school's pupils, is walked by hundreds of people every year.
