= Hawkmoor (TV series) =

1978 British television series

Hawkmoor is a 1978 British television series created by Lynn Hughes and based on the activities of Twm Siôn Cati, a 16th-century Welsh folk hero.

The 5-part series starred John Ogwen as Twm and Jane Asher as Lady Johane Williams, and also featured Godfrey James as Twm's right-hand man Shanco, Jack May as the English-born Sheriff John Stedman, Tom Owen as the sheriff's son John, Philip Madoc as Vicar Davyd, Meredith Edwards as Sir Tom Williams and Rachel Thomas as Agnes. The series depicted Twm as a Welsh Robin Hood/freedom fighter protecting the Welsh people from the repression of Sheriff Stedman and the cruel (Catholic) Vicar Davyd during the reign of Queen Mary I of England.

A Penguin paperback (ISBN 0-14-004501-5) relating some of the television adventures (and containing a ballad actually written by Twm) was written by Lynn Hughes and published in 1978.
