= Maurice Wynn =

Welsh courtier and politician (died 1580)

Maurice (or Morris) Wynn or Morys Wynn ap John of Gwydir (in or before 1520 – 18 August 1580) was a Welsh courtier and politician.

He was the eldest son of John "Wynn" ap Maredudd from whom he inherited the Gwydir estate in 1559.

His heir was his eldest son, John Wynn, 1st Baronet.

In 1551, he married Jane (Sian) Bulkeley, daughter of Sir Richard Bulkelely and Catherine Griffith, and sister of Sir Richard Bulkeley. From his first marriage he had three sons, including John Wynn, 1st Baronet and Ellis Wynn and five daughters, including Margaret, who married Thomas Salisbury. His second marriage was to Anne Greville, who died c.1570.

Before the end of January 1573, he married his third wife Katheryn of Berain and they had four children:

- Edward Wynn. Married Blanche Vaughan.
- Siân (Jane) Wynn (d.1665). Married Simon Thelwall.
- Morris Wynn (b.1563, d. 1609)
- Robert Wynn

He was the Custos Rotulorum of Caernarvonshire bef. 1562 – aft. 1577. He was High Sheriff of Caernarvonshire for 1554 and elected the Member of Parliament (MP) for Caernarvonshire in October 1553, April 1554 and 1563.

== Sources ==
- Oxford Dictionary of National Biography, Wynn family (per. c.1465–1678), landowners by J. Gwynfor Jones.
- The History of the Gwydir Family, John Wynne, Woodall and Venables, 1878.
