= Edward Vaughan (died 1718) =

Welsh politician

Edward Vaughan (died 5 December 1718), of Glan-y-Llyn, Merionethshire and Llwydiarth, Montgomeryshire, was a Welsh Tory politician who sat in the English and British House of Commons for 43 years from 1675 to 1718. He was briefly Father of the House.

Vaughan was the eldest son of Howel Vaughan of Glan-y-Llyn, Merioneth and his wife Elizabeth Jones, daughter of Humphrey Jones of Ddol, Flintshire. He inherited from his wife's uncle Edward Vaughan MP, the estates of Llwydiarth and Llangedwyn, Denbighshire in 1661 and succeeded his father in 1669. He married Mary Purcell, daughter of John Purcell, MP of Nantcribba in 1672.

Vaughan was appointed a deputy lieutenant of Montgomeryshire and Merionethshire from 1674 to 1688, for Merionethshire from 1689 to ?1696, and for Montgomeryshire from 1701 to ?death. He was High Sheriff of Montgomeryshire for January to November 1688 and Custos Rotulorum of Merionethshire from 1711 to ?1714.

Vaughan was returned as Member of Parliament (MP) for Montgomeryshire at general elections in March 1679, October 1679, 1681, 1685, 1689, 1690, 1695, 1698, February 1701, December 1701, 1702, 1705, 1708, 1710, 1713 and 1715.

Vaughan died in December 1718. He had two daughters and one son, who predeceased him. His property went to his son-in-law, Watkin Williams Wynn who married his daughter Ann.

Parliament of England
Preceded by Hon. Andrew Newport	Member of Parliament for Montgomeryshire; 1679–1707	Succeeded by Parliament of Great Britain
Parliament of Great Britain
Preceded by Parliament of England	Member of Parliament for Montgomeryshire; 1707–1719	Succeeded by Hon. Price Devereux
Preceded by Thomas Erle	Father of the House; 1718	Succeeded by Richard Vaughan
