= Custos Rotulorum of Merionethshire =

This is a list of people who have served as Custos Rotulorum of Merionethshire.

- John "Wynn" ap Maredudd 1543 – bef. 1558
- Lewis ap Owen 1553–1555
- Ellis Price bef. 1558 – bef. 1562
- Owen ap John ap Howell Vaughan bef. 1562 – bef. 1564
- Ellis Price bef. 1564 – aft.1577
- Robert Dudley, 1st Earl of Leicester bef. 1579 –1588
- Sir Robert Salusbury bef. 1594–1599
- Sir Thomas Myddelton bef. 1599 –1617
- William Salusbury 1617 – aft. 1626
- Hugh Nanney 1629–1646
- Interregnum
- Sir Thomas Myddelton, 1st Baronet 1660–1663
- Sir John Owen 1663–1666
- William Owen 1666–1678
- Sir John Wynn, 5th Baronet 1678–1688
- William Herbert, 1st Marquess of Powis 1688–1689
- Sir William Williams, 1st Baronet 1689–1690
- Sir John Wynn, 5th Baronet 1690–1711
- Edward Vaughan 1711–1718
- Lewis Owen 1722–1729
- William Vaughan 1731–1775

For later custodes rotulorum, see Lord Lieutenant of Merionethshire.
