= Hugh Gwynn =

Welsh colonist in Gloucester, Virginia

Col. Hugh Gwynn

Member of the Virginia House of Burgesses from Gloucester County
- In office 1652–1690

Personal details
- Parent: Sir Owen Wynn, 3rd Baronet (father)
- Relatives: Sir Richard Wynn, 4th Baronet (brother)

Hugh Gwynn was a Welsh colonist who served in the Virginia House of Burgesses representing Gloucester from 1652 to 1690.

== Biography ==
Colonel Hugh Gwynn was a son of Sir Owen Wynn, 3rd Baronet and Grace Williams. His mother was the niece of John Williams and his brother was Sir Richard Wynn, 4th Baronet. He was a vestryman in Kingston Parish in Gloucester in 1680.
