= John Glynne (judge) =

Welsh lawyer (1602–1666)

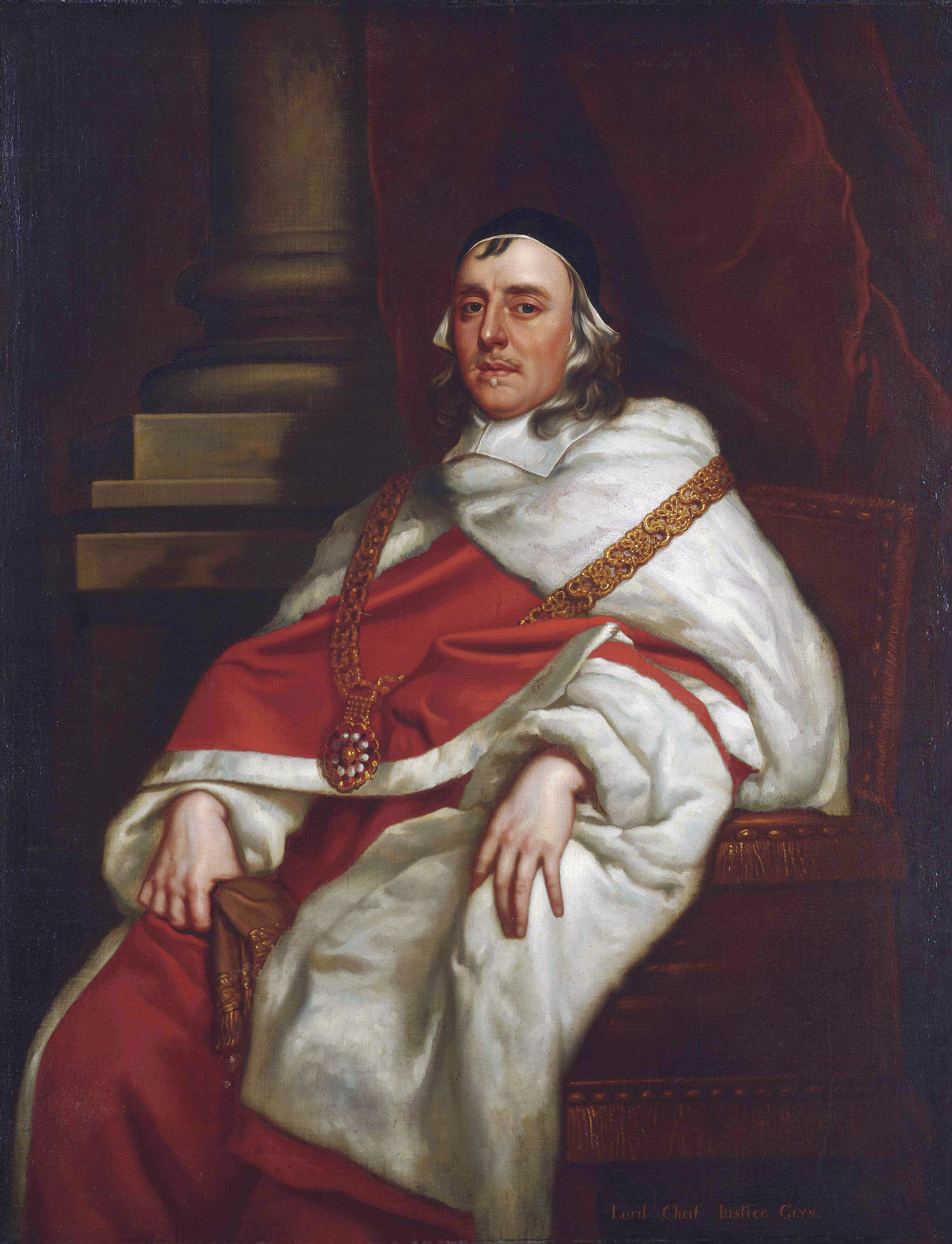
Sir John Glynne, Lord Chief Justice

Sir John Glynne KS (1602 – 15 November 1666) was a Welsh lawyer of the Commonwealth and Restoration periods, who rose to become Lord Chief Justice of the Upper Bench, under Oliver Cromwell. He sat in the House of Commons at various times between 1640 and 1660.

== Early life ==
John Glynne was born at Glynllifon, Carnarvonshire, the second son of Sir William Glynne of Glynllifon, a very ancient family that claimed a fanciful descent from Cilmin Droed-tu, founder of one of the 15 tribes of North Wales, by Jane, the daughter of John Griffith (of Plas Mawr), Caernarvon. His elder brother was Thomas Glynn, MP for Caernarvonshire.

Glynne was educated at Westminster School and Hart Hall, Oxford, where he matriculated 9 November 1621, aged 18. He entered Lincoln's Inn on 27 January 1620 and was called to the Bar on 24 June 1628.

== Career ==
In April 1640, Glynne was elected Member of Parliament for Westminster in the Short Parliament. He was re-elected MP for Westminster for the Long Parliament in November 1640. His first major parliamentary triumph was the summing-up of the case against the Earl of Strafford, and he enjoyed a successful career during the commonwealth, becoming a serjeant-at-law, judge of assize, and finally Lord Chief Justice of the Upper Bench, and was a member of the Committee of Both Kingdoms. However, his Presbyterianism put him out of favour with the army, and he was expelled from Parliament in 1647 and imprisoned in the Tower for almost a year. He was counsel for the University of Cambridge from 1647 to 1660. He returned to Parliament for Caernarvonshire from 1654 to 1655 in the First Protectorate Parliament. In 1656 he was elected MP for both Carnarvonshire and Flintshire in the Second Protectorate Parliament and chose to sit for Flintshire. He was nominated and accepted a seat in Cromwell's Other House.

In 1656 he was judge in a criminal case involving George Fox. After several allegations against Fox failed to stand up, he demanded Fox remove his hat, and on his refusal to do so, ordered him to pay a fine of 20 marks and committed him to prison until he did so.

In the later years of the Protectorate, Glynne resigned his legal offices and turned to favour the Restoration. He was returned again for Caernarvonshire in the Convention Parliament, and was knighted on 16 November 1660, and shortly thereafter made Prime Serjeant.

== Death and succession ==
Glynne died at his home in London on 15 November 1666, and was buried on 27 November at St Margaret's Church, Westminster, in his own vault under the altar. He left his estate of Hawarden in Flintshire (which he had bought in 1654) to his son Sir William Glynne, 1st Baronet; his estates at Henley-by-Normandy and Pirbright in Surrey descended to his son John by his second marriage.

== Family ==
Glynne married firstly Frances Squib, eldest daughter of Arthur Squib. Glynne purchased Henley Manor, Normandy, Surrey from Squib, whom he assisted through his influence to the positions of Clarenceux Herald and Teller of the Exchequer. They had the following children, 2 sons & 5 daughters:

- Sir William Glynne, 1st Baronet
- Thomas, unmarried, s.p.
- Frances, died an infant
- Jane, wife of Sir Robert Williams, Bt., of Penrhyn, Carnarvonshire, nephew & heir of John, Archbishop of York & Lord-Keeper of the Great Seal of England
- Margaret, died an infant
- Anne, wife of Sir John Evelyn, Bt., of Lee Place, Godstone, Surrey
- Frances, wife of William Campion (1639–1702) of Combwell, Goudhurst, Kent, eldest son of Sir William Campion (d. 1648, siege of Colchester) of Danny Park, Hurstpierpoint, Sussex, and Grace, eldest da. of Sir Thomas Parker of Ratton in Willingdon.

He married secondly Anne Manning, daughter. & co-heiress of John Manning of London & Cralle, Sussex, widow of Sir Thomas Lawley, Bt., of Cornwall. They had the following children:

- John Glynne, of Henley Park, Surrey, who m. Dorothy, da. of Francis Tylney of Tylney Hall, Rotherwick, Hants. They had 2 daughters, Elizabeth, who died unmarried and Dorothy, who married Sir Richard Child, Bt., later 1st Earl Tylney. John was educated at Hart Hall, Oxon. where he matriculated on 16 November 1666, aged 16. He entered Lincoln's Inn. John purchased Pirbright Manor, Surrey, from Francis, Lord Montagu in 1677 and sold Henley Manor, Surrey, to Frederick Tylney on 20 October 1679.
- Mary, wife of Sir Stephen Anderson of Eyeworth, Beds.

== Sources ==
- "Glynne, Sir John (GLN647J2)". A Cambridge Alumni Database. University of Cambridge.
- Jenkins, Dr. David. "Glynne family, of Hawarden, Flints.". Dictionary of Welsh Biography.
- Noble, Mark (1787). Memoirs of the protectorate-house of Cromwell, ..., Volume I, pp. 390–92

Parliament of England
Vacant Parliament suspended since 1629	Member of Parliament for Westminster; 1640–1648; With: William Bell	Not represented in Rump Parliament
Vacant Not represented in Barebones Parliament	Member of Parliament for Carnarvonshire; 1654–1656; With: Thomas Madryn	Succeeded by Henry Lawrence; Robert Williams
Preceded by John Trevor; Andrew Ellice	Member of Parliament for Flintshire; 1656; With: John Trevor	Succeeded by John Trevor
Preceded by William Glynne	Member of Parliament for Caernarvonshire; 1660–1661	Succeeded by Sir Richard Wynn
Legal offices
Preceded by Henry Rolle	Lord Chief Justice; 1655–1660	Succeeded by Sir Richard Newdigate
