= Sir Richard Wynn, 4th Baronet =

Welsh landowner

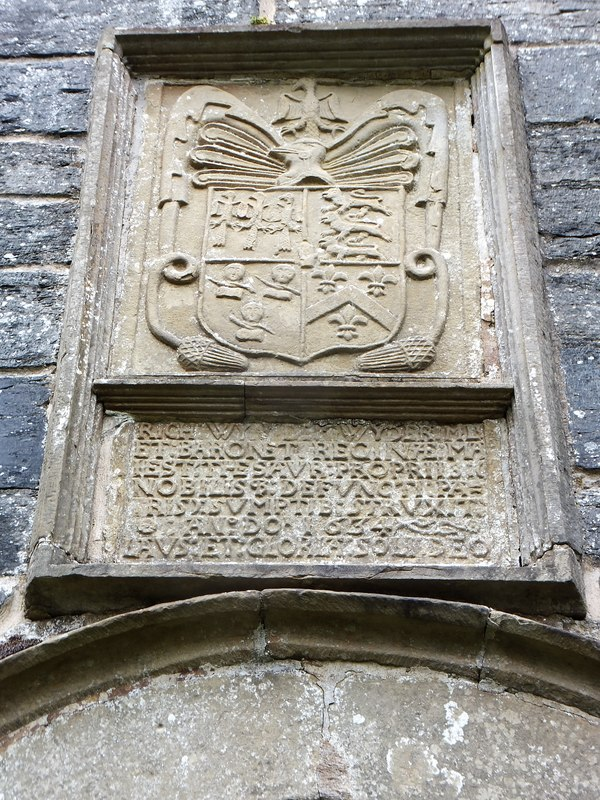
Memorial to Sir Richard at St Grwst's Church, Llanrwst

Sir Richard Wynn, 4th Baronet (1625–1674) was a Welsh landowner who was Sheriff of Caernarvonshire and twice a member of Parliament for the same county.

== Biography ==
Sir Richard succeeded his father Sir Owen Wynn at Gwydir in 1660. His mother was Grace Williams, a niece of John Williams, Archbishop of York.

Sir Richard was sheriff of Caernarvonshire (1657/1658) and twice MP for Caernarvonshire: in the Rump Parliament (1647–1653) and the Cavalier Parliament (1661–1675).

Sir Richard spent some time imprisoned in Caernarfon Castle. He may have been incarcerated because of possible involvement in the Royalist Booth's Uprising (1659) as he was by that time a son-in-law to one of the participants Sir Thomas Myddelton.

Sir Richard died in 1674 and was succeeded to the title by his cousin Sir John Wynn, 5th Baronet, the only son of Henry Wynn, who himself was the tenth son of Sir John Wynn, 1st Baronet.

== Family ==
In 1654 Sir Richard married Sarah, daughter of Sir Thomas Myddelton. They had one child, Mary (1661–1689), who inherited the Gwydir estate on the death of her father. She married Robert Bertie (1660–1723), 17th Lord Willoughby de Eresby and later 1st Duke of Ancaster and Kesteven.

The Llanrwst Parish registers also mention either one or two Johannis Wynn's as son(s) of Sir Richard both dated to 1667, one entry in January the other in October. Thus implying Sir Richard may have illegitimate descendants in the modern day however evidence beyond that and letters in the Gwydir papers confirming mentions of a son are scarce.

== Notes ==
Parliament of England
Preceded by Sir John Glynne	Member of Parliament of Caernarvonshire; 1661–1675	Succeeded by The Viscount Bulkeley
Honorary titles
Preceded by Interregnum	Custos Rotulorum of Caernarvonshire; 1660–1674	Succeeded by Richard Bulkeley
Baronetage of England
Preceded by Owen Wynn	Baronet (of Gwydir) c. 1660–1674	Succeeded by John Wynn
