= Llwydiarth =

Coordinates: 52.729289°N 3.434700°W

Llwydiarth: Welsh: Llwydiarth
- Location within Powys
- OS grid reference: SJ032155
- Principal area: Powys
- Preserved county: Powys
- Country: Wales
- Sovereign state: United Kingdom
- Post town: Welshpool
- Postcode district: SY21
- Dialling code: 01691
- Police: Dyfed-Powys
- Fire: Mid and West Wales
- Ambulance: Welsh
- UK Parliament: Montgomeryshire and Glyndŵr
- Senedd Cymru – Welsh Parliament: Montgomeryshire

Llwydiarth is a small village in Powys, Wales. It is located near Lake Vyrnwy. The village is mostly made up of a caravan park and holiday centre. It does however have a church dedicated to Saint Mary and a sub post office with a filling petrol station. The village is located near Llanfihangel. It is not served by any public transport with the nearest railway station in Machynlleth, 20 miles (32 km) away. The nearest bus stop is in Llanfyllin, 7 miles (11 km) away.
