= Gruffydd Davies =

16th-century Welsh politician

Gruffydd Davies (c. 1517 – 1583 or later) was the member of the Parliament of England for the constituency of Caernarfon (Wales) for the parliament of March 1553.
