= Thomas Madryn =

Welsh politician

Thomas Madryn was a Welsh politician who sat in the House of Commons in 1654. He fought in the Parliamentary army in the English Civil War.

Madryn was the son of either Robert Madryn, High Sheriff in 1603 or Griffith Madryn, High Sheriff in 1633. He was a J.P. for Carnarvonshire and was High Sheriff of Caernarvonshire in 1642. In the Civil War, he was a colonel in the Parliamentary army. He was High Sheriff of Carnarvonshire again in 1648 and 1649. He was appointed commissioner for sequestration in North Wales on 18 February 1650 and held the position until 1659. He was appointed Custos Rotulorum of Anglesey on 27 July 1653.

In 1654, Madryn was elected Member of Parliament for Carnarvonshire in the First Protectorate Parliament. He stood for parliament again for Carnarvonshire in 1659 and petitioned after being unsuccessful.

Following the Restoration, Madryn was High Sheriff of Carnarvonshire again in 1666.

Parliament of England
Preceded by Not represented in Barebones Parliament	Member of Parliament for Carnarvonshire; 1654; With: John Glynne	Succeeded by John Glynne; Robert Williams
