= Sir Owen Wynn, 3rd Baronet =

English baronet

Sir Owen Wynn 3rd Baronet
- Born: 1592
- Died: 1660 (aged 67–68)
- Other names: Owen Gwynn, Gwinn
- Occupation: Welsh baronet
- Children: Sir Richard Wynn, 4th Baronet; Hugh Gwynn
- Father: Sir John Wynn, 1st Baronet

Sir Owen Wynn, 3rd Baronet (1592–1660) was a Welsh baronet. He was the son of Sir John Wynn, 1st Baronet. He inherited his title after the death of his brother Sir Richard Wynn, 2nd Baronet in the summer of 1649. He married Grace Williams, daughter of Hugh Williams, and niece of John Williams, Archbishop of York. Owen was succeeded at Gwydir by his son Sir Richard Wynn, 4th Baronet in 1660.

== Notes ==
Baronetage of England
Preceded by Richard Wynn	Baronet (of Gwydir); 1649–c.1660	Succeeded by Richard Wynn
