= The Adventures and Vagaries of Twm Shon Catti =

The Adventures and Vagaries of Twm Shôn Catti, descriptive of life in Wales: interspersed with poems is a book written by Thomas Jeffery Llewelyn Prichard in 1828.

== Background ==
Thomas Jeffery Llewelyn Prichard was a Welsh travelling actor and author. Prichard is mostly known for his tale, entitled ‘The adventures and vagaries of Twm Shon Catti, descriptive of life in Wales: interspersed with poems’. The novel was one of the first publications to feature the Welsh folklore character, Twm Siôn Cati, a sly highwayman often described as the 'Welsh Robbin Hood'. The volume was a large financial success and was regarded by some as Wales’s first ever novel. The original 1828 edition, printed in Aberystwyth, was further developed in two subsequent editions, printed in 1839 and 1873.
