= Sir Robert Williams, 2nd Baronet =

Politician in Wales

Sir Robert Williams, 2nd Baronet of Penrhyn (c.1629–1680), was a politician in Wales.

Robert was likely born around 1650, the son and heir of Sir Griffith Williams, 1st Baronet (d.1663). He served as Member of Parliament for Caernarvonshire, 1656–1658, and for Caernarvon Boroughs in 1659. He was one of the Williams-Bulkeley baronets; he became a baronet in 1663.

Parliament of England
Preceded by Sir John Glynne; Thomas Madryn	Member of Parliament for Caernarvonshire; 1656–1658; With: Sir John Glynne; Henry Lawrence	Succeeded by William Glynne
Preceded by Not represented in Protectorate parliaments	Member of Parliament for Caernarvon Boroughs; 1659	Succeeded by William Glynne
Baronetage of England
Preceded by Griffith Williams	Baronet (of Penrhyn); 1663–1678	Succeeded by John Williams
