= John Ogwen =

Welsh actor

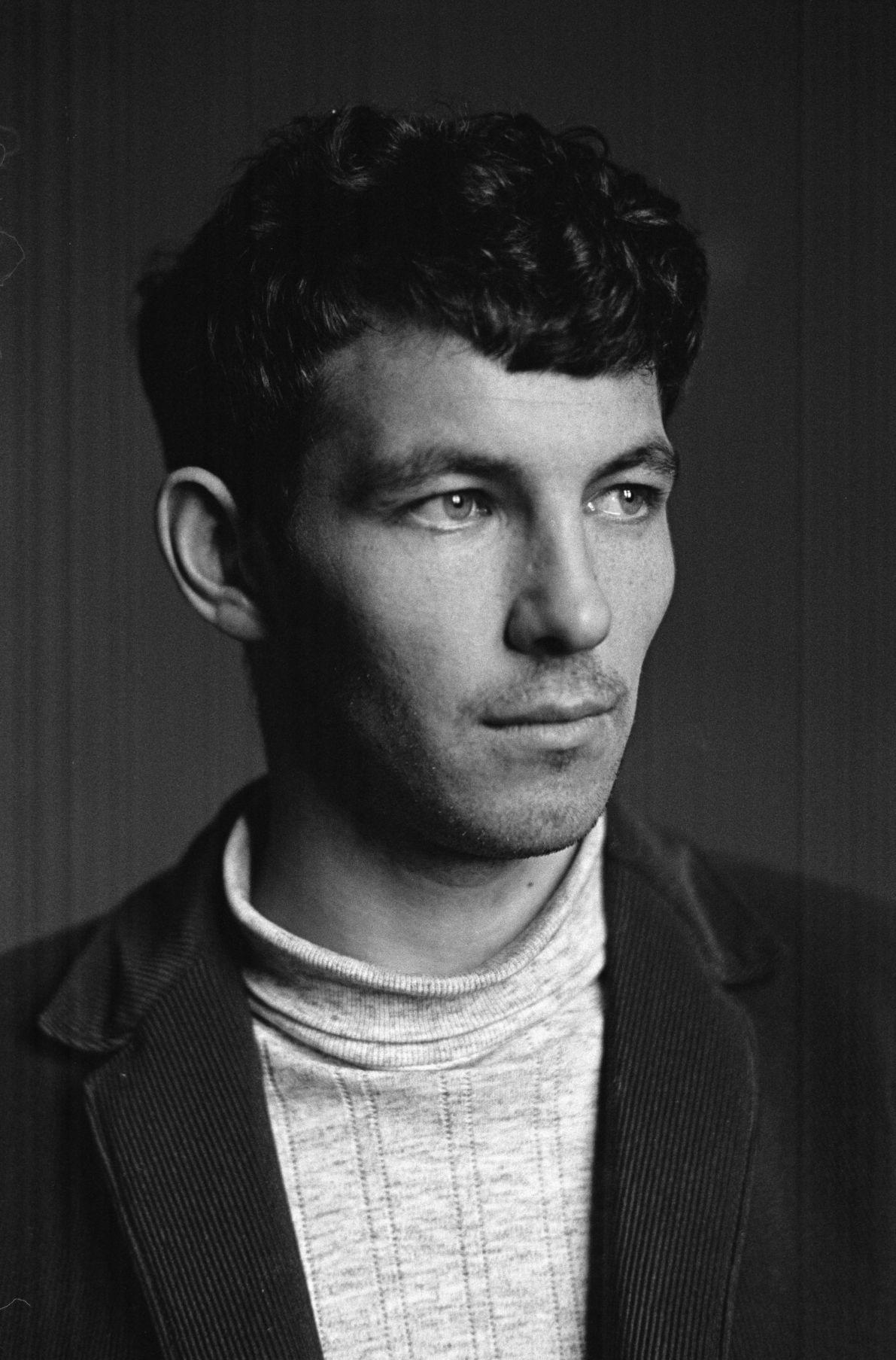
- Born: 25 April 1944 (age 82); Sling, Wales
- Education: University College of North Wales
- Occupation: Actor
- Years active: 1968–present
- Spouse: Maureen Rhys
- Children: 3

John Ogwen (born 25 April 1944) is a Welsh actor.

== Early life ==
Ogwen was born and raised in Sling near Bethesda in the Ogwen Valley, from which his surname derives. He attended Ysgol Dyffryn Ogwen, then studied English and Welsh at the University College of North Wales. When told by his agent, "You'll have to make up your mind whether you want to be a nationalist or an actor", he replied, "I'll be a bit of both."

== Career ==
He is best known to British audiences for his starring role in the 1978 drama series Hawkmoor, and appearances in the television series The District Nurse and the Doctor Who serial Revelation of the Daleks, Ogwen has been a stalwart of Welsh language television and film since the early 1970s. He has also written plays, presented documentary series and recorded readings of Welsh-language works.

In 2004 he was awarded a BAFTA Cymru Special Award for his contribution to Welsh television and film.

== Personal life ==
Ogwen has a keen interest in football, and played as a striker for Bangor City when still in the sixth form at school. Today he is a keen Everton supporter.

He is married to Maureen Rhys, one of Wales' most recognisable actresses, and in the past they have frequently worked together in productions. They have three children, and live in Bangor.

== Partial filmography ==
=== Films ===
- Blood Circle (1994)
- Oed yr Addewid (2002)
- Eldra (2002)

=== Television ===
- Hawkmoor (1978)
- The District Nurse (1984)
- Doctor Who (1985)
- Deryn (1985)
- Tomos y Tanc a'i Ffrindiau (1986) - narrator (Welsh language version of Thomas the Tank Engine & Friends)
- Tylluan Wen (1997)
- Belonging (2005)
- Y Gwyll (2015)
