= John "Wynn" ap Maredudd =

John "Wynn" ap Maredudd (born around 1495, died 9 July 1559) was a Welsh Member of Parliament.

== Biography ==
He was son of Meredydd ap Ieuan ap Robert of Dolwyddelan, then Caernarvonshire. He had twenty six siblings. He is cited by Sir John Wynn, 1st Baronet as his ancestor and head of the family at that time. He is believed to have had a number of children including Morys Wynn ap John, Owain Wynn ap John, Griffith Wynn ap John and Robert Wynn. His brother-in-law was Edward Stanley, MP for Merioneth.

He inherited his father's estates at Gwydir, Nantconwy, Dolwyddelan and Llanfrothen. He rebuilt Gwydir in 1555 and served as Member of Parliament for Caernarvonshire in 1542 and 1547–1551. He also served as High Sheriff of Caernarvonshire for 1544 and 1556. and as Custos Rotulorum of Merionethshire from 1543 to c.1548. He was succeeded by his son Morys Wynn ap John (Maurice Wynn).

== Twm Siôn Cati ==
ap Maredudd has been suggested as the possible father of Twm Siôn Cati. In his 1828 work, The Adventures and Vagaries of Twm Shon Catti Thomas Jeffery Llewelyn Prichard suggested that he had an amorous relationship with Cati Jones of Tregaron, and the relationship produced an illegitimate son. Together with his mother's name, Twm took the Welsh form of his father's name "Siôn", becoming known as Twm Siôn Cati.

Parliament of England
Preceded by ? ?	Member of Parliament for Caernarvonshire; 1542; With: ?	Succeeded by John Pulevston ?
Preceded by John Puleston ?	Member of Parliament for Caernarvonshire; 1547; With: ?	Succeeded by John Wynn ap Hugh
