= Sir John Wynn, 1st Baronet =

Welsh noble, politician, antiquarian, landlord and author

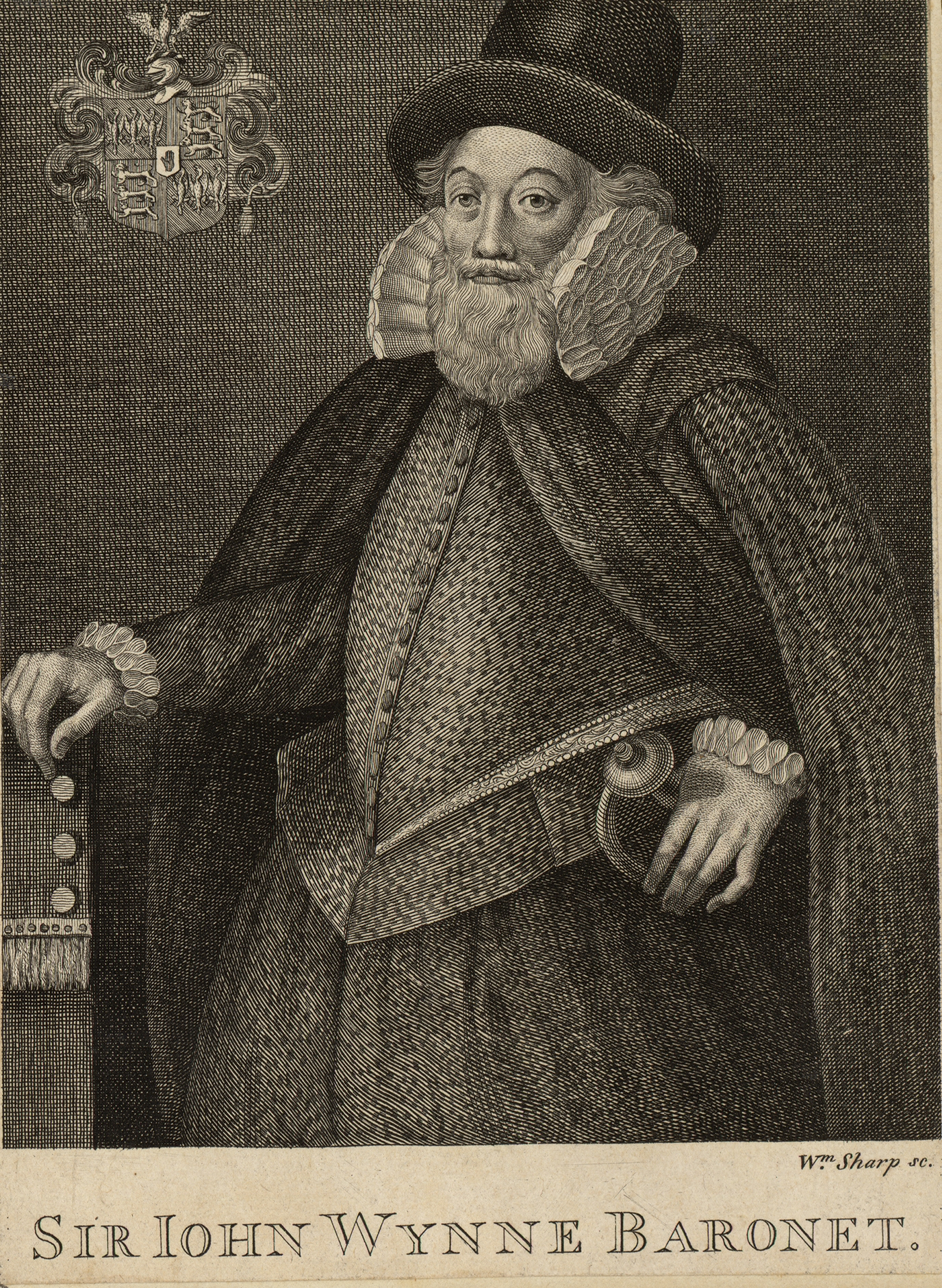
- 18th century engraving of Sir John Wynn

Personal details
- Children: 12, including: Sir Richard Wynn, 2nd Baronet; Sir Owen Wynn, 3rd Baronet; Henry
- Parent: Morys Wynn ap John (father)

The coat of arms of the Wynn of Gwydir Family were: Vert, three eagles displayed in fess Or

Sir John Wynn, 1st Baronet (1553 – 1 March 1627), was a Welsh baronet, Member of Parliament and antiquary.

== Life ==
He was the son of Morys Wynn ap John, whom he succeeded in 1580, inheriting Gwydir Castle in Carnarvonshire. John was educated at All Souls College, Oxford (1570, awarded BA 1578) and studied law at Furnival's Inn (1572) and the Inner Temple (1576). He claimed to be directly descended from the princes of Gwynedd through Rhodri ab Owain son of Owain Gwynedd. The known male line from his family died out in 1846 with the death of Dr. Rice Wynne of Shrewsbury descended from Sir John's younger full brother Robert Wynn of Maesmochnant, and it is presumed the senior male line passed to the Anwyl of Tywyn family although it is unconfirmed due to accounts of possible lost relatives such as previously not much talked about son(s) of Sir Richard his grandson of whom one may have survived to have offspring yet records past the baptism and death records for them in the Llanrwst parish registry is scant, as two known branches from Gwydir survived past the main line fathered by Sir John, the descendants of his full brother aforementioned and the descendants of his half-brother Edward Wynn of Ystrad which became the Wynnes of Llwyn and Pengwern who died in 1835 with the death of Maurice Wynn of Pengwern.

His mother was Jane (Siân) Bulkeley, daughter of Sir Richard Bulkeley and his wife Catherine Griffith, and sister of Sir Richard Bulkeley, head of the Anglesey branch of a powerful landowning family, who originally came from Cheshire.

He was Member of Parliament for this county in 1586 and served as Sheriff of Caernarvonshire for 1587–88 and 1602–03 and Sheriff of Merionethshire for 1588–89 and 1600–01. He was appointed Deputy Lieutenant of Caernarvonshire in 1587, a member of the Council of the Marches of Wales c.1603 and Custos Rotulorum of Caernarvonshire in 1618 (to 1627).

Wynn was regarded as quarrelsome and a bad neighbour and landlord. His lawsuits often went on for many years; some were against his own relatives like Sir Richard Bulkeley and the Griffiths of Penrhyn Castle. He became regarded as such a public nuisance that in 1615 the Council of the Marches of Wales, of which he was a former member, reprimanded him, fined him and briefly imprisoned him.

In 1606, he was made a knight and in 1611 became the first of the Wynn baronets. He was interested in several mining ventures and also found time for antiquarian studies.

== Family ==
He married Sidney, daughter of Sir William Gerard, Lord Chancellor of Ireland, and his wife Dorothy Barton, by whom he had 10 sons and 2 daughters. His eldest son, John, was unhappily married to Margaret Cave in 1606 and died in Italy in 1614.

Sir John's successor was his second and eldest surviving son Richard. His daughter Elizabeth married Sir John Bodvel of Caerfryn, and was the mother of John Bodvel. Another daughter, Mary, married Sir Roger Mostyn.

== Works ==
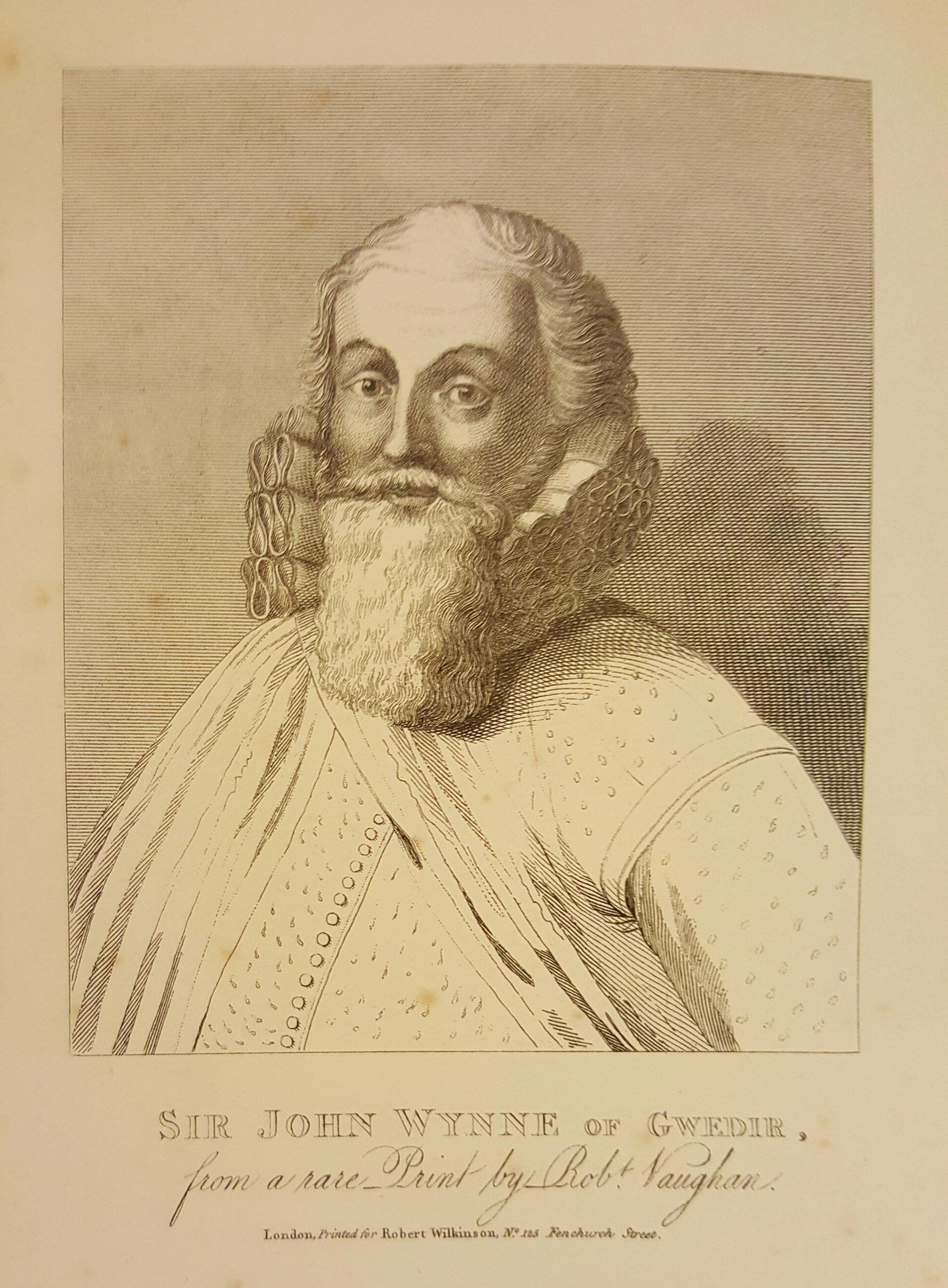
John Wynn as depicted in "History of the Gwydir Family"

Wynn's work The History of the Gwydir Family, which had a great reputation in North Wales, was intended to assert his claim to royal ancestry. In a legal challenge to this claim, Thomas Prys of Plas Iolyn brought a case against him and Sir John was forced to defend himself in court. He won the case and afterwards was recognised as the most prominent male heir of the House of Gwynedd. Under Welsh succession law the head of the Price of Esgairweddan family at the time, descended through Iorwerth ab Owain Gwynedd and Dafydd II, would lead the senior line and be de jure Princes of Gwynedd, however they died out in the male line in 1702 and the royal title and headship of the House of Aberffraw would have passed then from the Price family to the Wynn Family of Gwydir at that time under the native succession law of Kings laid out in Cyfraith Hywel as descendants of one of the surviving senior lineages of the Welsh Royal Houses. John Wynn's book was first published by Daines Barrington in 1770, and in 1878 an edition was published at Oswestry. It is valuable as the only work which describes the state of society in North Wales in the 15th and the earlier part of the 16th century.

- Owain Gwynedd, Prince of Gwynedd (d. November 1170), married Cristina ferch Gronw ap Owain ap Edwin
- Rhodri ab Owain Gwynedd, Lord of Anglesey (d.1195), married Annest ferch Rhys ap Gruffudd
- Tomas ap Rhodri married Annest ferch Einion ap Seisyllt
- Caradog ap Tomas, married Efa ferch Gwyn ap Gruffudd ap Beli
- Gruffudd ap Caradog, married Lleuca ferch Llywarch Fychan ap Llywarch
- Dafydd ap Gruffudd of Rhos, married Efa ferch Gruffudd Fychan
- Hywel ap Dafydd, married Efa ferch Evan ap Hywel ap Maredudd
- Maredudd ap Hywell (d. after 1353), married Morfydd verch Ieuan ap Dafydd ap Trahaern Goch
- Ifan ap Robert (b. 1438, d. 1469), married Catherine ferch Rhys ap Hywel Fychan
- Maredudd ap Ifan (Ieuan) ap Robert (b. c. 1459, d. 18 March 1525), married Ales ferch William Gruffudd ap Robin
- John "Wynn" ap Maredudd (d. 9 July 1559), married Ellen Lloyd ferch Morys ap John
- Morys Wynn ap John (d.1580), married (1) Jane Bulkeley; (2) Ann Grevill; and (3) Katherine of Berain
- Sir John Wynn ap Morys of Gwydir, later Sir John Wynn, 1st Baronet

== Legacy ==
At Llanrwst Wynn founded a hospital and endowed a school, now Ysgol Dyffryn Conwy. His estate of Gwydir came to Robert Bertie, first Duke of Ancaster, in the 17th century, by his marriage with the heiress of the Wynns. On the death of the penultimate duke in 1779, Gwydir was inherited by his sister Priscilla, Baronness Willoughby de Eresby in her own right, whose husband was created Baron Gwydyr.

Sion Rickard acting as Sir John Wynn at the Llanrwst Almshouse Festival 2010.

On the death of Alberic, Baron Willoughby de Eresby in 1870, this title (now merged in that of earl of Ancaster) fell into abeyance between his two daughters, while that of Baron Gwydir passed to his cousin and male heir. Gwydir itself was sold by the earl of Ancaster in 1895, the house and part of the estate being bought by Lord Carrington, who also claimed descent from Sir John Wynn.

On 28 May 2010, Llanrwst celebrated the 400th anniversary of the almshouses there, which were built by Sir John Wynn to provide shelter for twelve poor older men of the parish. Today, those twelve rooms are used to show different periods of history.

In this festival, Sir John Wynn was played by actor Sion Rickard, a student studying Performing Arts at Coleg Llandrillo, who arrived with his "wife" in the main square of Llanrwst by horse and carriage from Gwydir Castle, then answered questions from the local town crier, went inside the almshouse to check the standard of what he had built and delivered a speech to the people of Llanrwst.

Honorary titles
Preceded by Sir Thomas Mostyn	Custos Rotulorum of Caernarvonshire; 1618–1627	Succeeded by Sir Richard Wynn
Baronetage of England
New creation	Baronet (of Gwydir); 1611–1626	Succeeded by Richard Wynn
