= Wynn baronets =

Set index for Wynn baronets

There have been two baronetcies created for the surname Wynn; both titles were granted to families from North Wales. As of 2026 one title is extant.

- Wynn baronets of Gwydir (1611)
- Wynn baronets of Bodvean (1742): see Baron Newborough

== See also ==
- Williams-Wynn baronets
- Wynne baronets
