= Royal Carnarvon Rifles =

Auxiliary unit of the British Army

Carnarvon Militia Royal Carnarvon Rifles 4th Battalion, Royal Welsh Fusiliers
- Active: 1661–31 March 1908
- Country: England (1661–1707); Kingdom of Great Britain (1707–1800); United Kingdom (1801–1908)
- Branch: Militia
- Role: Infantry
- Size: 1 Battalion
- Part of: Royal Welch Fusiliers
- Garrison/HQ: Caernarfon

Commanders
- Notable commanders: Thomas Wynn, 1st Baron Newborough; Edward Douglas-Pennant, 1st Baron Penrhyn; Hon Henry Lloyd-Mostyn

The Carnarvonshire Militia, later the Royal Carnarvon Rifles, was an auxiliary (Note: It is incorrect to describe the British Militia as 'irregular': throughout their history they were equipped and trained exactly like the line regiments of the regular army, and once embodied in time of war they were fulltime professional soldiers for the duration of their enlistment.) regiment reorganised in the county of Caernarfonshire (then spelt Carnarvonshire) in North Wales during the 18th Century from earlier precursor units. Primarily intended for home defence, it served in Britain and Ireland through all Britain's major wars until it was disbanded in 1908.

== Carnarvon Trained Bands ==
The universal obligation to military service in the Shire levy was long established in England and was extended to Wales. King Henry VIII called a 'Great Muster' in 1539, which showed 2429 men available for service in the County of Anglesey, of whom 729 were foot soldiers with 'harness' (armour) the rest 'without any harness, weaponed with bills, spears, clubs or staves. And as for any horsemen there be none within the said county able to do the King service'.

The legal basis of the militia was updated by two acts of 1557 covering musters (4 & 5 Ph. & M. c. 3) and the maintenance of horses and armour (4 & 5 Ph. & M. c. 2). The county militia was now under the Lord Lieutenant, assisted by the Deputy Lieutenants and Justices of the Peace (JPs). The entry into force of these Acts in 1558 is seen as the starting date for the organised Militia of England and Wales. Although the militia obligation was universal, it was clearly impractical to train and equip every able-bodied man, so after 1572 the practice was to select a proportion of men for the Trained Bands, who were mustered for regular training.

In the 16th Century little distinction was made between the militia and the troops levied by the counties for overseas expeditions. However, the counties usually conscripted the unemployed and criminals rather than send the trained bandsmen. Between 1585 and 1602 Carnarvonshire supplied 556 men for service in Ireland. The men were given three days' 'conduct money' to get to Chester, the main port of embarkation for Ireland. Conduct money was recovered from the government, but replacing the weapons issued to the levies from the militia armouries was a heavy cost on the counties.

With the passing of the threat of invasion, the trained bands declined in the early 17th Century. Later, King Charles I attempted to reform them into a national force or 'Perfect Militia' answering to the king rather than local control. The Carnarvon Trained Bands of 1638 consisted of 200 men armed with 100 muskets and 100 Corslets (body armour, signifying pikemen). They also mustered 25 horse. Carnarvonshire was ordered to send 160 men overland to Newcastle upon Tyne for the Second Bishops' War of 1640. However, substitution was rife and many of those sent on this unpopular service would have been untrained replacements.

=== Civil Wars ===
Control of the militia was one of the areas of dispute between Charles I and Parliament that led to the English Civil War. When open war broke out between the King and Parliament, neither side made much use of the trained bands beyond securing the county armouries for their own full-time troops. Most of Wales was under Royalist control for much of the war, and was a recruiting ground for the King's armies. The Carnarvon TBs probably garrisoned Carnarvon Castle. In January 1645 a contingent was ordered to Conway under the command of Colonel Sir William Williams. Colonel John Bodvel was appointed governor of Caernarfon Castle in March 1646 and the castle was besieged by Parliamentary forces from April. Bodvel commanded the garrison and negotiated its surrender in June 1646 at the end of the First English Civil War. Thomas Glynn, MP for Carnarvonshire was appointed governor of Carnarvon Castle after its surrender.

== Carnarvon Militia ==
After the Restoration of the Monarchy, the Militia was re-established by the Militia Act 1661 under the control of the king's lords lieutenant, the men to be selected by ballot. This was popularly seen as the 'Constitutional Force' to counterbalance a 'Standing Army' tainted by association with the New Model Army that had supported Cromwell's military dictatorship.

The militia forces in the Welsh counties were small, and were grouped together under the command of the Lord President of the Council of Wales. As Lord President, the Duke of Beaufort carried out a tour of inspection of the Welsh militia in 1684, when the Carnarvon Militia consisted of a Troop of horse commanded by Captain Bulkeley and three companies of foot. In 1697 the Carnarvon and Merioneth militia were combined and consisted of a troop of 48 horse and 530 foot commanded by Col Hugh Nanney, MP for Merioneth.

Generally the militia declined during the long peace after the Treaty of Utrecht in 1713. Jacobites were numerous amongst the Welsh Militia, but they did not show their hands during the Risings of 1715 and 1745, and bloodshed was avoided.

== 1757 Reforms ==
Under threat of French invasion during the Seven Years' War a series of Militia Acts from 1757 re-established county militia regiments, the men being conscripted by means of parish ballots (paid substitutes were permitted) to serve for three years. There was a property qualification for officers, who were commissioned by the lord lieutenant. An adjutant and drill sergeants were to be provided to each regiment from the Regular Army, and arms and accoutrements would be supplied when the county had secured 60 per cent of its quota of recruits.

Carnarvonshire's quota was a company of just 80 men, but Major-General the Earl of Cholmondeley, who was Lord Lieutenant of Caernarvonshire and several other counties, found that he was unable to raise militia in any of his Welsh counties other than Flintshire. The problem was less with the other ranks raised by ballot than the shortage of men qualified to be officers, even after the requirements were lowered for Welsh counties. Thomas Wynn of Glynllifon became Lord Lieutenant of Carnarvonshire in 1761 and the Carnarvon Militia was finally raised under his command, receiving its arms on 28 August 1762. The company was immediately put under training and on 28 September was ordered to be embodied for permanent service. This was carried out at Carnarvon on 5 October. However, by now the war was drawing to a close and the militia were disembodied in early 1763.

The disembodied company – sometimes known unofficially as the 'Royal Carnarvon Grenadiers' – was kept up to strength by periodic use of the ballot, and was probably called out for annual training. The arms and equipment were kept at 'Fort Williamsburg', Glynllifon, by the commanding officer, who succeeded as Sir Thomas Wynn, 3rd Baronet of Bodvean, in 1773 and was created Lord Newborough in 1776.

=== American War of Independence ===
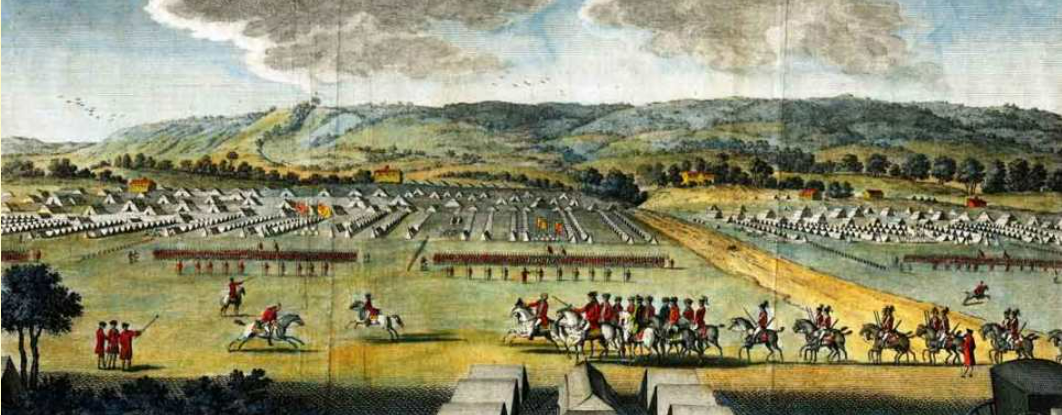
Coxheath Camp in 1778.

The American War of Independence broke out in 1775, and by 1778 Britain was threatened with invasion by the Americans' allies, France and Spain. The militia were called out, and orders to embody the Carnarvon Militia were issued to Lord Newborough on 26 March 1778. The company was marched to Holyhead in Anglesey, where it carried out garrison duty.

The Carnarvon company remained in Anglesey until the spring of 1779, when it was marched to Kent to join Coxheath Camp near Maidstone. This was the army's largest training camp, where the Militia were exercised as part of a division alongside Regular troops while providing a reserve in case of French invasion of South East England. The understrength militia units from small counties (Anglesey, Carnarvon and Rutland) were attached to guard the artillery park of the division, and they were later criticised as having worked as artillery and forgotten their infantry training. Lord Newborough was replaced as commanding officer in 1781 by Ellis Wynn. The Carnarvon Militia remained in South East England for the rest of its embodiment. In 1782 it moved into Essex and was still there when hostilities ended in 1783 and it was marched back to Carnarvon to be disembodied.

=== French Revolutionary and Napoleonic Wars ===
The Carnarvon Militia was embodied again in 1793 when Revolutionary France declared war against Britain. The unit was stationed on the South Coast of England to meet the invasion threat, with its headquarters (HQ) at Eastbourne, later moving into Kent. The French Revolutionary Wars saw a new phase for the English militia: they were embodied for a whole generation, and became regiments of full-time professional soldiers (though restricted to service in the British Isles), which the regular army increasingly saw as a prime source of recruits. They served in coast defences, manning garrisons, guarding prisoners of war, and for internal security, while their traditional local defence duties were taken over by the part-time Volunteers and mounted Yeomanry.

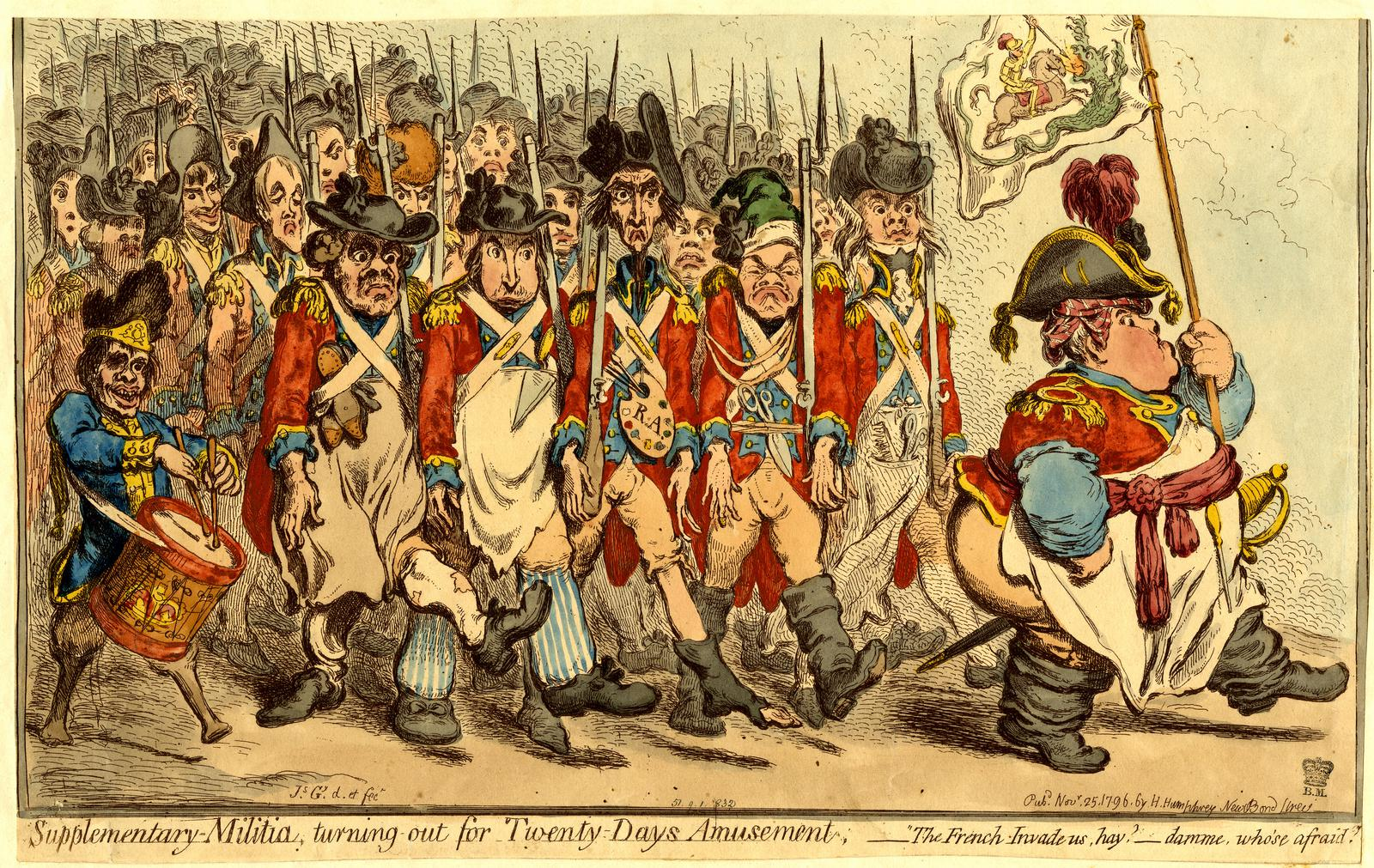
Supplementary-Militia, turning-out for Twenty Days Amusement: 1796 caricature by James Gillray.

In a fresh attempt to have as many men as possible under arms for home defence in order to release regulars, in 1796 the Government created the Supplementary Militia, a compulsory levy of men to be trained in their spare time, and to be incorporated in the Regular Militia in emergency. Carnarvonshire's new quota was fixed at 176 men. However, the militia ballot was unpopular in the county, and protest meetings took place at Penmachno, Dolwyddelan, Ysbyty Ifan and Capel Curig, while at Cerig y Druidion a balloted man was snatched from the hands of the militia by protesters. Carnarvon's militia quota was further increased to 239 in 1799. On 8 July 1798 a general order was issued to form temporary battalions from the flank companies (Grenadier and Light companies) of militia regiments in the Southern District. The Grenadier Company of the Glamorgans joined those of the Bedfordshire, Denbighshire, Derbyshire, Middlesex and Northamptonshire Militia in the 3rd Grenadier Battalion at Shoreham-by-Sea, commanded by Lt-Col Payne of the Bedfordshires. The regiment was designated the Royal Carnarvon Fuzileers (Fusiliers) in 1800.

The Treaty of Amiens was signed in March 1802, and the Carnarvon Militia were disembodied. However, the Peace of Amiens was short-lived and the militia were re-embodied in 1803. By June the Carnarvon Militia were serving on the South Coast once more. The right of several Welsh militia units, including the Carnarvon, to use the 'Royal' prefix was confirmed in 1804, and the regiment was now referred to simply as the Royal Carnarvonshire Militia. Richard Edwards, who had commanded the regiment since its embodiment in 1793, was promoted to colonel on 21 February 1804.

During the summer of 1805, when Napoleon was massing his 'Army of England' at Boulogne for a projected invasion, the regiment with 137 men in 3 companies, under Maj John Hampton, was stationed with the Royal Glamorgan Militia at Pevensey Barracks on the Sussex coast, forming part of Brigadier-General Moore Disney's brigade.

By late 1805 the regiment had moved to the West Country, being stationed at New Cranby Barracks, Plymouth Dock, where its duties included dockyard security, coast defence, and guarding Prisoners of War confined in the Prison hulks or at Mill Prison. On 1 February 1808 a draft of newly raised militiamen marched from Bangor to Plymouth to reinforce the regiment. The following month the Royal Carnarvon moved to Sussex to take up duties at Chichester and Worthing, where the regiment volunteered to serve in Ireland. This offer was not accepted at the time, but the regiment supplied a steady number of volunteers for the Regular Army. Later in 1808 the regiment served at Battle and Winchelsea. By March 1809 it was at Pevensey Barracks, later moving to Kent and then back to Worthing.

=== Carnarvonshire Local Militia ===
While the Regular Militia were the mainstay of national defence during the Napoleonic Wars, they were supplemented from 1808 by the Local Militia, which were part-time and only to be used within their own districts. These were raised to counter the declining numbers of Volunteers, and if their ranks could not be filled voluntarily the militia ballot was employed.

In 1804 three independent infantry Volunteer units in the county had combined as the Loyal Bangor, Carnarvon and Conway Infantry under the command of Lieutenant-Colonel Thomas Assheton Smith of Vaynol. In July 1808 the men were invited to transfer to the Local Militia, and the Bangor and Carnarvon companies enthusiastically accepted. The regiment was stood down in September 1808 when most of its officers and men, together with some of the other volunteers in the county, transferred to the new Carnarvonshire Local Militia under the command of Lt-Col Assheton Smith. The new regiment assembled at Carnarvon for its first 28-day raining in June 1809. It trained at the town in each of the following years, though only for 14 days from 1811. In 1813 the regiment volunteered for garrison duty anywhere in the UK if required, but was not called upon. The Local Militia was disbanded in 1816.

=== Ireland ===
In common with a number of other Welsh militia regiments, the Royal Carnarvon was converted into a light infantry regiment in 1810. The Interchange Act 1811 passed in July allowed English and Welsh militia regiments to serve in Ireland and vice versa, and the regiment's offer to serve was taken up in November that year. The regiment embarked at Portsmouth and went into garrison at Longford, the first British militia regiment to serve there after the Act. Shortly after arrival the regiment volunteered again, this time to serve in the Peninsular War. Although this offer was not taken up, it was reported in the Welsh press, together with rumour that the Royal Carnarvon Light Infantry were being converted into a Rifle unit. This was carried out in 1812, when it was officially redesignated the Royal Carnarvon (Rifle Corps).

While stationed at Longford the regiment was employed assisting the Revenue Service and the Civil Power, and in protecting military stores. Acts of sabotage and terrorism were still common following the suppression of the Irish Rebellion of 1798. A private of the Royal Carnarvon was seriously wounded in January 1813 when a sentry post was fired upon. As the regiment prepared to leave Longford in March 1813 a number of the men volunteered to transfer to regiments of the Line. On 26 March the Royal Carnarvons marched to Belfast, from where they sailed back to the mainland in May. They were first stationed at Haddington in Scotland, moving to Berwick from July to September before returning to Haddington. Once again, the whole regiment volunteered for active service with the local regiment, the Royal Scots. However, with the abdication of Napoleon in April 1814 the war was coming to an end. The regiment was ordered home in May and reached Carnarvon in late June. Disembodiment was completed on 7 July.

=== Long peace ===
Unlike some militia units, the Royal Carnarvon Rifles was not embodied during the brief Waterloo campaign the following year. After Waterloo there was another long peace. Although officers continued to be commissioned into the militia and ballots were still held, the regiments were rarely assembled for training and the permanent staffs of sergeants and drummers were progressively reduced. The Royal Carnarvon Rifles was only called out for training in 1820, 1821 and 1825. In 1831 there was considerable civil unrest, so the militia ballot was enforced in Carnarvonshire and the regiment was assembled for training.

Colonel Edwards retired from the command in 1838, and he was succeeded by Major O.J.C. Nanney, formerly of the East India Company's army, who continued as Major-Commandant.

== 1852 Reforms ==
The Militia of the United Kingdom was revived by the Militia Act 1852, enacted during a renewed period of international tension. As before, units were raised and administered on a county basis, and filled by voluntary enlistment (although conscription by means of the Militia Ballot might be used if the counties failed to meet their quotas). Training was for 56 days on enlistment, then for 21–28 days per year, during which the men received full army pay. Under the Act, militia units could be embodied by Royal Proclamation for full-time home defence service in three circumstances:

1. 'Whenever a state of war exists between Her Majesty and any foreign power'.
2. 'In all cases of invasion or upon imminent danger thereof'.
3. 'In all cases of rebellion or insurrection'.

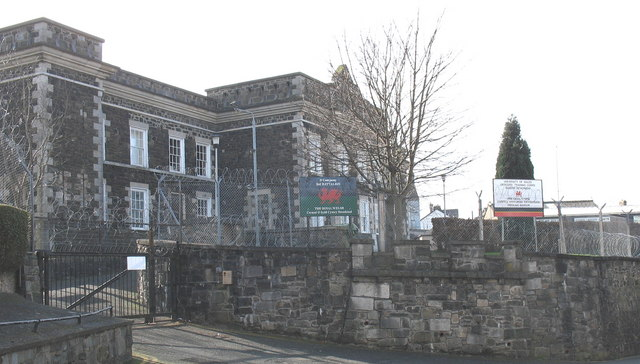
Caernarfon Barracks, built in 1855 for the Royal Carnarvon Rifles.

The Hon Edward Douglas-Pennant, formerly of the Grenadier Guards, was appointed as lieutenant-colonel commandant of the Royal Carnarvon Rifles on 30 August 1852 and on 30 September he was instructed to recruit the regiment up to its establishment of four companies. Annual training was resumed at Bangor in 1852, 1853 and 1854. Unlike many other militia regiments, the Royal Carnarvon was not called out for garrison duty during the Crimean War. Instead it carried out a longer period of training at Carnarvon in 1855, but then the 1856 training was suspended. Carnarvon Barracks was opened in 1855 to house the permanent staff and the armoury and magazine. It was built on a field known as Cae Bach on the outskirts of the town, the site being bought by the county from the Vaynol Estate. Training was held at Carnarvon in 1857, 1858 and 1859, in which year the regiment was re-equipped with the Pattern 1853 Enfield rifle.

=== Royal Carnarvon & Anglesey Rifles ===
The Royal Carnarvon Rifles consisted of only four companies, and on 28 July 1860, in line with its policy of amalgamating the militia regiments from the small Welsh counties, the War Office ordered the regiment to merge with the Royal Anglesey Light Infantry (three companies) as the Royal Carnarvon & Anglesey Rifles. The two lieutenant-colonels continued as joint commandants, but unlike some of the other forced mergers, it appears that the Anglesey and Carnarvonshire contingents did actually train together at Carnarvon. In 1861 the combined regiment was re-equipped with the short pattern Enfield rifle in place of the 1853 pattern. In 1867 the War Office rescinded the mergers of the Welsh militia regiments, and on 11 March the Royal Carnarvon Rifles regained its independence. In 1874 the establishment of the regiment was increased by two companies.

The Militia Reserve introduced in 1867 consisted of present and former militiamen who undertook to serve overseas in case of war.

== Cardwell Reforms ==
Under the 'Localisation of the Forces' scheme introduced by the Cardwell Reforms of 1872, militia regiments were brigaded with their local regular and Volunteer battalions. The Carnarvon, Anglesey, Denbigh, Flint and Merioneth Militia were all assigned to Sub-District No 23 at Wrexham with the 23rd Foot (the Royal Welsh Fusiliers). (Note: The regiment officially became the Royal Welch Fusiliers in 1921, but had used the archaic spelling 'Welch' for much longer.)The militia now came under the War Office rather than their county lords lieutenant. Around a third of the recruits and many young officers went on to join the regular army.

Following the Cardwell Reforms a mobilisation scheme began to appear in the Army List from December 1875. This assigned regular and militia units to places in an order of battle of corps, divisions and brigades for the 'Active Army', even though these formations were entirely theoretical, with no staff or services assigned. The Royal Carnarvon Rifles were assigned with two Irish militia battalions to 2nd Brigade of 1st Division, VI Corps. The brigade would have mustered at Conway in time of war.

In 1878 the regiment assembled for its annual training at Carnarvon in April. On 4 April the Militia Reserve was called out because of the international tension over the Russo-Turkish War. Of 205 men on the roll of the Royal Carnarvon Rifles Militia Reserve, 195 reported for duty of whom 25 were rejected on medical grounds. The remainder were sent in two drafts to reinforce the 1st Battalion, Royal Welsh Fusiliers, then serving at Inniskilling.

== 4th Battalion, Royal Welsh Fusiliers ==
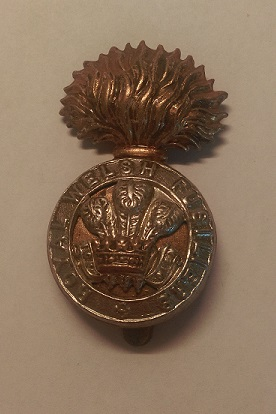
Royal Welch Fusiliers' cap badge.

The Childers Reforms of 1881 took Cardwell's reforms further, with the militia formally joining their linked regiments. Of the four militia regiments in No 23 Sub-District, the Royal Anglesey Light Infantry had been converted to Royal Engineers and the Royal Flint Rifles became 6th Battalion King's Royal Rifle Corps (KRRC). The others formed two battalions of the Royal Welsh Fusiliers (RWF) on 1 July 1881:

- 3rd (Royal Denbigh & Merioneth Militia) Battalion
- 4th (Royal Carnarvon Militia) Battalion

The 6th (Royal Flint Militia) Bn, KRRC, was disbanded in 1889 and a Flint contingent was added to the 3rd Bn, at which time the Merionethshire contingent was transferred from the 3rd to the 4th Bn. The battalion was thereafter listed as the 4th (Royal Carnarvon & Merioneth Militia) Battalion.

Unlike the rest of the RWF, which was concentrated at the regimental depot at Wrexham, the 4th Bn retained Carnarvon Barracks. From 1887 onwards annual training was increasingly held at a tented camp at Cae Toplis Field outside the town, though in 1891 it was held at Altcar Training Camp near Liverpool and in 1895, 1896 and 1899 under canvas at Dolgelley in Merioneth. In the late 1880s recruitment became a problem in rural North Wales, where many employers refused to hire militiamen and where there was a shortage of Welsh-speaking recruiting sergeants. The RWF attempted to rectify the latter problem by selecting Welsh-speaking sergeants from the Regular battalions. In 1893 the eight companies of the 4th Bn were reorganised on a geographic basis with appropriate titles and where possible under a captain from the district:

- A Company: Portmadoc Company
- B Company: Conway Company
- C Company: Carnarvon Company
- D Company: Lleyn Company
- E Company: Bala Company
- F Company: Dolgelley Company
- G Company: Ffestiniog (Merioneth Quarries) Company
- H Company: Bangor Company

=== Second Boer War ===
The outbreak of the Second Boer War saw the embodiment of militia battalions to replace the regulars being sent overseas. The 4th RWF was not selected, and the newly promoted commanding officer, Lt-Col Llewellyn Evans, complained to the War Office at his unit being overlooked in favour of the 3rd (Royal Denbigh & Flint Militia) Bn. However, on 1 March 1900 the 4th Bn was ordered to form a Militia Reserve draft and 53 men were sent to join the reinforcements for the RWF assembling at Crownhill Barracks, Plymouth. Fifteen men of the 4th Bn were in a draft sent to replace casualties in the 1st Bn, and were engaged in the Relief of Mafeking.

Annual recruit training for the 4th Bn began on 19 March 1900 and an order was received to prepare for embodiment. An advance party went to Crownhill Barracks, where the whole battalion was embodied from 11 May. On 22 May the battalion sent 40 Militia Reservists to Bulford Camp to join a draft for 1st Bn RWF, followed by another 50 on 21 June who joined drafts for the 1st and 2nd Bns Devonshire Regiment. The last draft supplied by the 4th Bn left for Bulford on 13 July and joined the 1st Bn RWF. Ten men from the 4th Bn RWF were killed in action or died on service in South Africa, several while serving with the Devons. The battalion carried out garrison duty at Plymouth and took part in a brigade training camp on Yenadon Down on Dartmoor. It entrained for Carnarvon on 16 October, where it was disembodied the following day.

=== Disbandment ===
After the Boer War, there were moves to reform the Auxiliary Forces (militia, yeomanry and volunteers) to take their place in the six army corps proposed by St John Brodrick as Secretary of State for War. However, little of Brodrick's scheme was carried out. Under the sweeping Haldane Reforms of 1908, the militia was replaced by the Special Reserve, a semi-professional force similar to the previous militia reserve, whose role was to provide reinforcement drafts for regular units serving overseas in wartime. The 4th (Royal Carnarvon & Merioneth Militia) Bn did not transfer to SR and was disbanded on 31 March 1908

After the disbandment the battalion's commanding officer, Col the Hon Henry Lloyd-Mostyn, went on to command the 3rd (Reserve) Bn, Cheshire Regiment (formerly the Cheshire Militia) in 1909–12, and during World War I he raised and commanded the 17th (Service) Bn, RWF. Caernarvon Militia Barracks was leased to the Caernarvonshire Territorial Force Association in 1910 and housed the 6th (Caernarvonshire and Anglesey) Battalion, Royal Welch Fusiliers.

== Commanders ==
The following served as commanding officer of the unit:

- Col Thomas Wynn, 1st Baron Newborough, 1762
- Maj Ellis Wynn, June 1781
- Col Richard Edwards, 13 May 1793
- Maj O.J.C. Nanney, formerly East India Company service, 1838
- Lt-Col Hon Edward Douglas-Pennant, formerly Grenadier Guards, 30 August 1852
- Lt-Col John McDonald, formerly 5th Fusiliers, 24 December 1858
- Lt-Col Hugh Jones, formerly 73rd Foot, 1865
- Lt-Col John Williams, 23 February 1872
- Lt-Col Henry Platt, 22 October 1884
- Lt-Col Owen Llewellyn Evans, 4 November 1899
- Col Hon Henry Lloyd-Mostyn of Bodysgallen Hall, formerly Regular officer with the RWF, 13 May 1903

=== Honorary Colonels ===
The following served as Honorary Colonel of the regiment:

- Edward Douglas-Pennant, 1st Baron Penrhyn, former CO, appointed 24 August 1858, died 31 March 1886
- Lt-Col John Williams, former CO, appointed 12 May 1886
- Maj George Douglas-Pennant, 2nd Baron Penrhyn, formerly 1st (Carnarvon) Carnarvonshire Rifle Volunteer Corps, appointed 6 March 1895, died 10 March 1907
- Maj Edward Douglas-Pennant, 3rd Baron Penrhyn, formerly Royal Buckinghamshire Yeomanry, appointed 1 June 1907

== Heritage and ceremonial ==
=== Uniforms and insignia ===
From 1762 to 1812 the regiment's uniform was of the same pattern as the regulars, the red jacket having blue facings, worn with white breeches. On conversion to a rifle corps in 1812 it adopted a Rifle green coat and breeches with black facings (similar to the Rifle Brigade). About 1862 the Royal Carnarvon & Anglesey Rifles adopted red facings (similar to the King's Royal Rifle Corps) instead of black, and these continued with the Royal Carnarvon until 1881. When the regiment became 4th Bn RWF in 1881 it lost its green uniform and adopted that regiment's red jackets with blue facings.

About 1803 the officers' Coatee button bore the Prince of Wales's feathers, coronet, and motto scroll Ich Dien, within an eight-pointed star, with the letters 'R.C' (for 'Royal Carnarvon') beneath. In the 1850s the other ranks' 'pork pie' caps had a two-part badge, with a stringed bugle-horn above a scroll inscribed 'ROYAL CARNARVON'. Around 1858 the officers' black metal Shako plate consisted of a crowned Maltese cross, in the centre of which was the Prince of Wales's feathers, coronet and motto, surrounded by a circle inscribed 'ROYAL CARNARVON RIFLES'. The officers' pouch belt of the time was in silver, with the same design, except that there was no crown, the eight points of the cross had small decorative balls, and there were small lions in the four angles. By about 1865 the Prince of Wales's insignia had been replaced by a bugle-horn, and by 1878 the regiment's precedence numeral '56' appeared within the strings. The regiment adopted the RWF's insignia in 1881.

The Regimental colour issued in 1762 would have carried the Coat of arms of the Lord Lieutenant of Carnarvonshire, Thomas Wynn, who was also the regiment's colonel. The background colour of the flag was probably blue to match the facings, but one report says that it was white. The regimental colour of the pair issued about 1803 is blue, with the Union Flag in the canton and a Union wreath of roses, shamrock and thistles in the centre. Within the wreath is the regimental name in gold letters in three lines: 'ROYAL/CARNARVON/MILITIA'. Rifle corps carried no colours, so these were laid up after 1812 and are preserved in the Royal Welch Fusiliers Museum.

=== Precedence ===
During the War of American Independence the county militia regiments were given an order of precedence determined by ballot each year. However, units such as the Carnarvon Militia that did not constitute a full battalion were not included. The order balloted for at the start of the French Revolutionary War in 1793 remained in force throughout the war; Carnarvonshire was again left out. Another ballot for precedence took place in 1803 at the start of the Napoleonic War and remained in force until 1833: Carnarvonshire was 16th. In 1833 the King drew the lots for individual regiments and the resulting list continued in force with minor amendments until the end of the militia. The regiments raised before the peace of 1763 took the first 47 places but the Carnarvon Militia raised in 1762 were included in the second group (1763–83), presumably because their first embodiment had been so short; they became 56th. When the Royal Anglesey amalgamated with the Royal Carnarvon in 1860, the combined unit inherited the latter's precedence of 56th. Most militia regiments paid little attention to the numeral, but the Royal Carnarvon Rifles incorporated it into their cap badge.

== See also ==
- Trained Bands
- Militia (English)
- Militia (Great Britain)
- Militia (United Kingdom)
- Royal Welch Fusiliers
