= Thomas Wynn, 2nd Baron Newborough =

British politician and peer (1802–1832)

Thomas John Wynn, 2nd Baron Newborough (3 April 1802 – 15 November 1832) was a British peer.

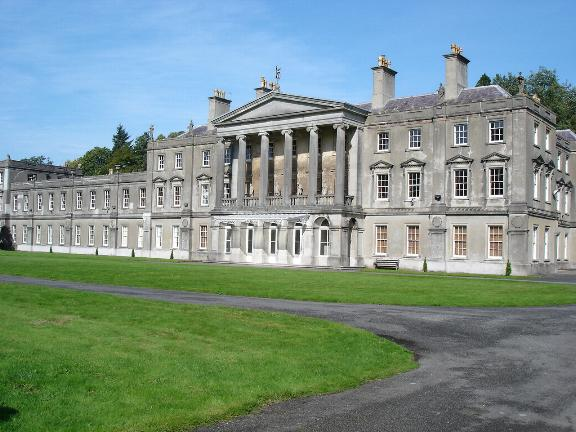
Plas Glynllifon - seat of the Lords Newborough

== Background ==
Newborough was the elder son of Thomas Wynn, 1st Baron Newborough of Glynllifon, and Maria Stella Petronilla, formally daughter of Lorenzo Chiappini but maybe a member of the House of Orléans.

He was educated at Rugby School and Christ Church, Oxford.

== Political career ==
Newborough succeeded his father in the barony in 1807. However, as this was an Irish peerage it did not entitle him to a seat in the House of Lords. He was instead elected to the House of Commons for Carnarvonshire in 1826, a seat he held until 1830.

== Personal life ==
Lord Newborough died in November 1832, aged 30. He was unmarried and was succeeded by his younger brother, Spencer Bulkeley Wynn, 3rd Baron Newborough.

Parliament of the United Kingdom
Preceded by Sir Robert Williams, Bt	Member of Parliament for Carnarvonshire; 1826–1830	Succeeded by Charles Griffith-Wynne
Peerage of Ireland
Preceded by Thomas Wynn	Baron Newborough; 1807–1832	Succeeded by Spencer Bulkeley Wynn
