= Sir John Wynn, 2nd Baronet =

Welsh politician

Sir John Wynn, 2nd Baronet (September 1701 – 14 February 1773), of Glynllifon and Bodvean, Caernarvonshire and Melai, Denbighshire was a Welsh politician who sat in the House of Commons between 1740 and 1768.

== Early life ==
Wynn was the eldest son of Sir Thomas Wynn, 1st Baronet and his wife Frances Glynn. He was admitted at Queens' College, Cambridge on 17 June 1720. Before 1735, he married Jane Wynne, daughter of John Wynne, MP, of Melai, Denbigh and Maenan, Caernarvon and his wife Sydney Wynn, sister of Sir Watkin Williams-Wynn, 3rd Baronet.

== Career ==
Wynn was surveyor general of mines in North Wales, constable of Caernarvon Castle, forester of Snowdon and steward of Bardsey from 1727 to 1761. He was appointed High Sheriff of Caernarvonshire for the year 1732 to 1733.

Wynn was returned as Member of Parliament (MP) for Caernarvonshire at a by-election on 2 January 1740. At the 1741 British general election he was returned instead for Denbigh Boroughs in a contest, followed by lengthy petition proceedings, which were ultimately decided in his favour. He was Deputy Cofferer of the Household from January to December 1743 and Deputy treasurer of Chelsea Hospital between 1741 and 1754. As the Chelsea Hospital post became incompatible with a seat in Parliament, he did not stand at the 1747 British general election. He succeeded his father to the baronetcy on 13 April 1749.

At the 1754 British general election Wynn was returned as MP for Caernarvonshire again. He was appointed Custos Rotulorum of Caernarvonshire in 1756. At the 1761 British general election he was returned for Caernarvon Boroughs. He did not stand in 1768.

== Later life and legacy ==
Wynn died on 14 February 1773, leaving four sons and three daughters, including:

- Thomas Wynn, 1st Baron Newborough (1736–1807) who succeeded to the baronetcy and became Baron Newborough
- Glyn Wynn (c. 1739–1793), MP for Caernarvon Boroughs

Parliament of Great Britain
Preceded by John Griffith	Member of Parliament for Caernarvonshire; 1740–1741	Succeeded by William Bodvell
Preceded by John Myddelton	Member of Parliament for Denbigh Boroughs; 1741–1747	Succeeded by Richard Myddelton
Preceded by William Bodvell	Member of Parliament for Caernarvonshire; 1754–1761	Succeeded by Thomas Wynn
Preceded by Robert Wynne	Member of Parliament for Caernarvon; 1761–1768	Succeeded by Glyn Wynn
Honorary titles
Preceded by Sir William Yonge	Custos Rotulorum of Caernarvonshire; 1756–1773	Succeeded by Sir Thomas Wynn
Baronetage of Great Britain
Preceded by Thomas Wynn	Baronet (of Bodvean); 1749–1773	Succeeded by Thomas Wynn
