= Baron Newborough =

British noble title

Baron Newborough is a title that has been created twice in the Peerage of Ireland; both titles are extant. The first creation came in 1716 in favour of George Cholmondeley, later 2nd Earl of Cholmondeley. See Marquess of Cholmondeley for further history of this creation.

== First creation ==
The Wynn Baronetcy, of Bodvean in the County of Caernarfon, was created in the Baronetage of Great Britain on 25 October 1742 for the first Baron's grandfather Thomas Wynn. He represented Caernarfon in the House of Commons and was also a court official. His son, the second Baronet, represented both Caernarfon and Caernarvonshire in Parliament. He was succeeded by his son, the third Baronet, who was elevated to the peerage in 1776.

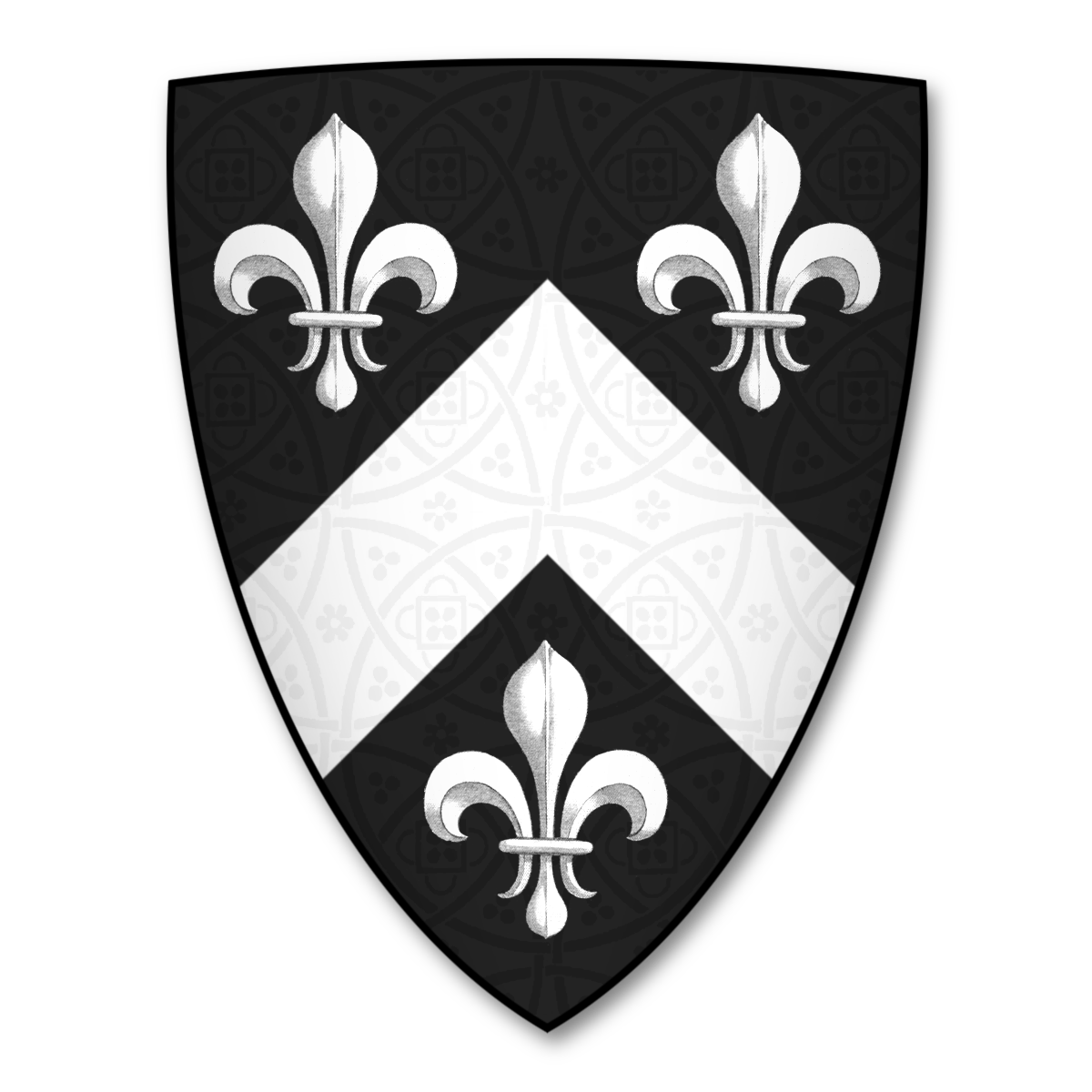
Coat of arms of the Collwyn ap Tangno.

The family origins were near Boduan, North Wales. John Wynn (John Wyn ap Hugh of Bodvel, died 1576) being the Bodvel family ancestor, John was high sheriff for Caernarfon. Wynn was the standard bearer for John, Earl of Warwick / Duke of Northumberland; this was for the Earl of Warwick's service at Kett's Rebellion in 1549 and he received Bardsey Island (Gwynedd) for his feats. Wynn descended directly from the Kings of Gwynedd via Collwyn ap Tangno (founder of the 5th tribe of the Fifteen Tribes of Wales). The Wynn of Bodvean family are also descendants of Ynyr Fychan from the Nannau family dynasty in Wales. The Wynn of Bodvel (Bodvean) family ceased to exist, but did marry into an Irish noble family to create the then new title, Baron Newborough.

== Second creation ==
The second creation came in 1776 in favour of Sir Thomas Wynn, 3rd Baronet. He represented Caernarvonshire, St Ives and Beaumaris in the House of Commons and also served as Lord Lieutenant of Caernarvonshire. His second wife, Maria Stella, became famous because she asserted to be the daughter of Louis Philippe II, Duke of Orléans and that she was exchanged at birth with the future King Louis Philippe I. Their son, the second Baron, represented Caernarvonshire in Parliament. He died unmarried and was succeeded by his younger brother.

The third Baron served as High Sheriff of Anglesey in 1847. On his death the titles passed to his grandson, the fourth Baron (the son of the Hon. Thomas John Wynn). He died as a result of an illness contracted on active service during the First World War and was succeeded by his younger brother, the fifth Baron.

When the fifth Baron died in 1957 the titles were inherited by his first cousin, the sixth Baron. He was the son of the Hon. Charles Henry Wynn, third son of the third Baron. He was succeeded in 1965 by his eldest son as the seventh Baron. As of 2022 the titles are held by the seventh Baron's son, the eighth Baron, who succeeded his father in 1998.

The family seat is no longer Peplow Hall, near Hodnet, Shropshire. The family also own the 12,500 acres Rhug Estate near Corwen, Denbighshire (the new family seat) and once owned Glynllifon (Plas Glynlifon), near Llandwrog, Gwynedd, Wales.

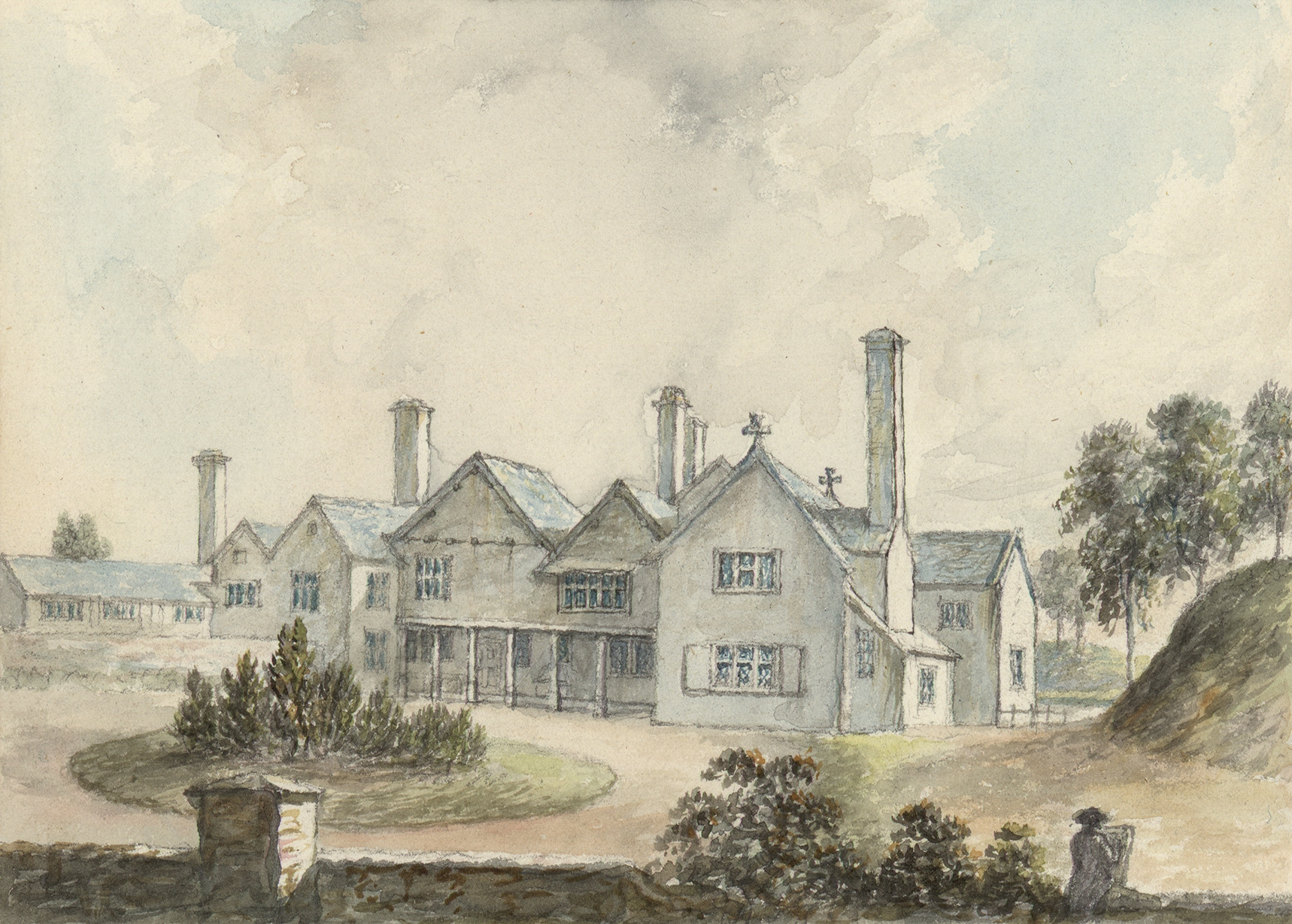
Rhug estate, the family seat

== Wynn baronets, of Bodvean (1742) ==
- Sir Thomas Wynn, 1st Baronet (1677–1749)
- Sir John Wynn, 2nd Baronet (1701–1773)
- Sir Thomas Wynn, 3rd Baronet (1736–1807) (created Baron Newborough in 1776)

== Barons Newborough (1776) ==
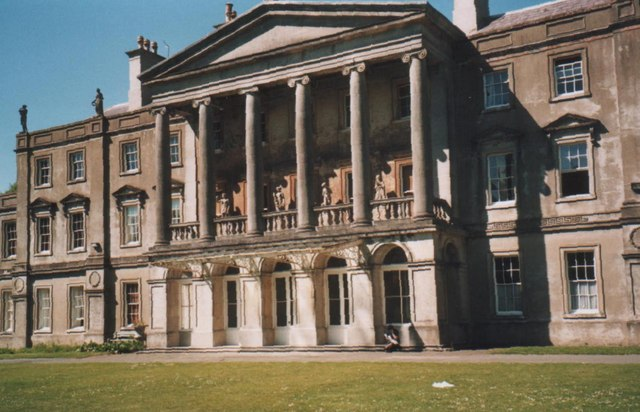
Plas Glynllifon, former seat of the Wynns of Bodvean

- Thomas Wynn, 1st Baron Newborough (1736–1807)
- Thomas John Wynn, 2nd Baron Newborough (1802–1832)
- Spencer Bulkeley Wynn, 3rd Baron Newborough (1803–1888)
- William Charles Wynn, 4th Baron Newborough (1873–1916)
- Thomas John Wynn, 5th Baron Newborough (1878–1957)
- Robert Vaughan Wynn, 6th Baron Newborough (1877–1965)
- Robert Charles Michael Vaughan Wynn, 7th Baron Newborough (1917–1998)
- Robert Vaughan Wynn, 8th Baron Newborough (b. 1949)

The heir presumptive is the present holder's first cousin Anthony Charles Vaughan Wynn (b. 1949).

== Arms ==
Coat of arms of Baron Newborough
Notes Arms, crest, and supporters as recorded in Debrett's Peerage (early 20th century). Crest A dexter cubit arm erect, habited in blue, holding in the hand a fleur-de-lis or. Escutcheon Sable, three fleurs-de-lis argent. Supporters Two lions guardant; the dexter gold with a plain collar charged with three fleurs-de-lis or; the sinister silver with a plain collet charged with three gules cinquefoils. Motto Gentele in manner, vigorous in action

== Notes ==
Baronetage of Great Britain
Preceded by Thorold baronets	Wynn baronets of Bodvean; 25 October 1742	Succeeded by Beauchamp-Proctor baronets
