= Glyn Wynn =

Welsh soldier and politician

Glyn Wynn (c. 1739–1793) was a Welsh soldier and politician who sat in the House of Commons for 22 years from 1768 to 1790.

== Early life and army ==
Wynn was the son of Sir John Wynn, 2nd Baronet and his wife Sydney Williams-Wynn, daughter of Sir Watkin Williams-Wynn, 3rd Baronet. He joined the army in 1755 and was a lieutenant in the 13th Foot in 1758. He was captain in the 90th Foot in 1759 and in the Coldstream Guards in 1763, also becoming Lieutenant-Colonel. He was appointed prothonotary and clerk of the Crown for Carnarvonshire Anglesey and Merion in 1762 and held the post until his death. He married Bridget Pugh, daughter. of Edward Philip Pugh of Penrhyn-Creuddyn, Carnarvonshire on 11 January 1766.

== Political career ==
Wynn stood for Carnarvon on his family interest and was returned as Member of Parliament unopposed in the 1768, 1774 and 1780 general elections. He retired from the army in 1773. In 1781 he was appointed receiver general of land revenue in North Wales and Cheshire. In 1784 he was a member of the St. Alban's Tavern group who tried to bring Fox and Pitt together. However he fell out with Lord Bulkeley who had supported him, and was in financial dispute with his brother Lord Newborough. This dispute related to annuities that their father had left for his children which had not been paid and to Wynn, who took proceedings in Chancery. In the 1784 general election Wynn sought the support of Lord Paget who was a great rival of Bulkeley in local politics. He was opposed in the polls by his brother Lord Newborough, who had gained the support of Lord Bulkeley. Wynn was successful after a poll lasting ten days although the contest between the brothers ruined the Wynn interest in Caernarvon. Before the general election of 1790 a compromise was concluded between Lord Bulkeley and Lord Paget (now Lord Uxbridge), and Wynn lost his seat.

== Later life and legacy ==
Wynn died on 25 June 1793. He and his wife Bridget had four sons and a daughter. The dispute over family inheritance continued until the death of Lord Newborough in 1807, and was then continued against his heirs. Wynn's daughter Bridget married John Perceval, 4th Earl of Egmont.

== Sources ==
Parliament of Great Britain
Preceded by Sir John Wynn, Bt	Member of Parliament for Carnarvon; 1768–1790	Succeeded by Lord Paget
