= Spencer Bulkeley Wynn, 3rd Baron Newborough =

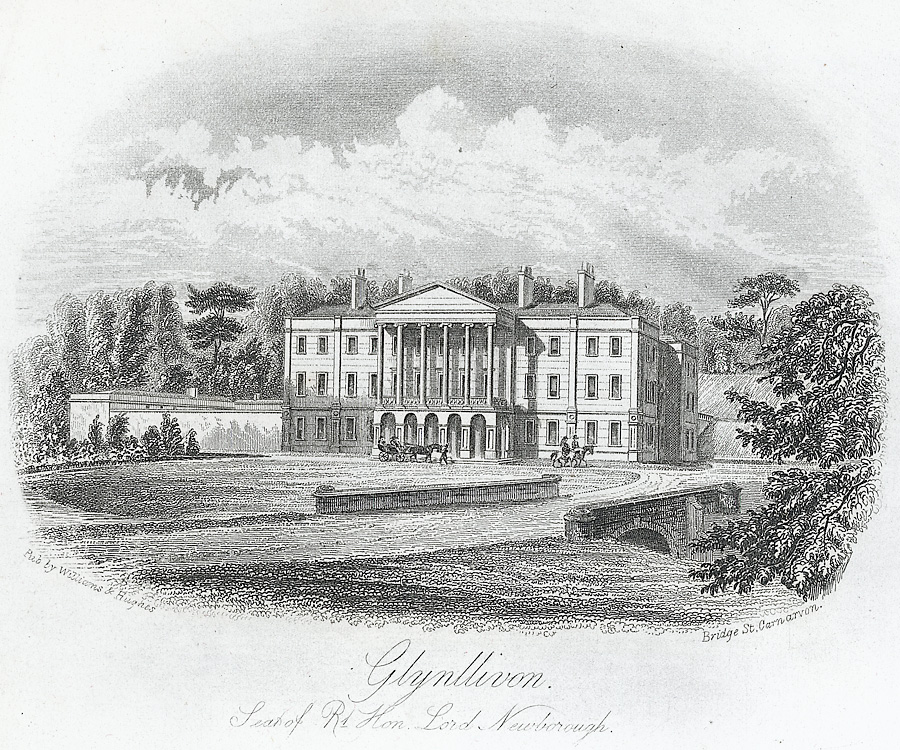
Glynllifon the estate of the Lords Newborough

Spencer Bulkeley Wynn, 3rd Baron Newborough (23 May 1803 – 1 November 1888) was Deputy Lieutenant of Carnarvon from 1846 and High Sheriff of Anglesey in 1847.

== Background ==
He was the son of Thomas Wynn, 1st Baron Newborough and Maria Stella Petronilla Chiappini, formally daughter of Lorenzo Chiappini but maybe a member of the House of Orléans.

He was educated at Rugby School and Christ Church, Oxford where he graduated BA in 1824.

On 15 November 1832, on the death of his older brother, Thomas Wynn, 2nd Baron Newborough, he succeeded to the titles of 3rd Baron Newborough of Bodvean, and 5th Baronet Wynn of Boduan.

He lived at Glynllivon Park, Carnarvonshire. In 1846 he was created deputy lieutenant of Carnarvon. He was High Sheriff of Anglesey for 1847-48.

== Family ==
On 3 May 1834 at Great Malvern Priory he married his first cousin Frances Maria de Winton, daughter of Revd. Walter de Winton and Maria Jacoba Chiappini of Hay Castle, county Brecon. They had 10 children:

- Frances Marina Wynn (d. 5 January 1886)
- Hon. Emily Annina Wynn (d. 18 August 1927) married Murray Gladstone, officer in the Royal Navy, on 29 September 1874
- Hon. Ellen Glynn Wynn (d. 17 March 1917)
- Hon. Catherine Wynn (d. 10 December 1885)
- Hon. Isabella Elizabeth Wynn (d. 29 July 1898) married Rowland Clegg-Hill, 3rd Viscount Hill, in 1876
- Hon. Thomas John Wynn (31 December 1840 - 25 August 1878) married Sybil Anna Catherine Corbett, daughter of British Envoy Edwin Corbett, on 11 July 1871. They had 3 daughters and 3 sons
- Hon. William Percival Wynn (19 August 1845 - 2 August 1851)
- Hon. Charles Henry Wynn (22 April 1847 - 14 March 1911) married Frances Georgiana Romer, daughter of Lieutenant-Colonel Robert William Romer and Frances Clarissa Simons, on 31 August 1876 at St George's, Hanover Square. They had 7 sons and 3 daughters
- Hon. Frederick George Wynn (17 January 1853 - 20 January 1932). He was unmarried

== Later life ==
In later life, he retired from public duties, and died on 1 November 1888. He was succeeded in the barony by his grandson, William Charles Wynn, the only living son of Thomas John Wynn who had predeceased him by 10 years. His estate was valued at £240,298 14s. 2d., (equivalent to £33,810,826 in 2023).. The Glynllifon estate passed to his youngest son, Frederick George Wynn.

Peerage of Ireland
Preceded by Thomas Wynn	Baron Newborough; 1832–1888	Succeeded by William Charles Wynn
