= William Griffith (1686–1715) =

Welsh Tory and later Whig politician

William Griffith (c. 1686–1715) of Cefnamwlch, Caernarvonshire, was a Welsh Tory and later Whig politician who sat in the House of Commons from 1708 to 1715.

Griffith was the eldest son of John Griffith and his wife Elizabeth Bulkeley, daughter of Robert Bulkeley, 2nd Viscount Bulkeley. He matriculated at Christ Church, Oxford on 8 June 1703, aged 16 and was admitted at Inner Temple in 1703. He succeeded to the estate of his father in June 1687. He married Mary Lake, daughter of Sir Bibye Lake, 1st Baronet.

Griffith was returned as Tory Member of Parliament for Caernarvon Boroughs at the 1708 general election under an agreement among the leading Tory families in the county. He was High Sheriff of Carnarvonshire for the year 1709 to 1710. He was returned MP for the Boroughs again in 1710. However he changed his political allegiance at the 1713 general election and was elected convincingly as Whig MP for Caernarvonshire. He was returned there unopposed at the 1715 general election. He was a member of the High Tory Loyal Brotherhood.

Griffith died without issue on 10 March 1715. His brother John succeeded to his estate and parliamentary seat.

Parliament of Great Britain
| Preceded by Thomas Bulkeley | Member of Parliament for Caernarvon Boroughs; 1708–1713 | Succeeded by Sir Thomas Wynn, Bt |
| Preceded by Sir John Wynn, 5th Baronet | Member of Parliament for Caernarvonshire; 1713–1715 | Succeeded by John Griffith |
