= John Griffith (1687–1739) =

Welsh politician

John Griffith (V) (c. 1687–1739) was a Welsh politician who sat in the House of Commons from 1715 to 1740.

Griffith was the second son of John Griffith and his wife Elizabeth Bulkeley, daughter of Robert Bulkeley, 2nd Viscount Bulkeley. He is numbered as the fifth of that name in the Griffith family of the Cefn Amwlch estate, Penllech, now in Gwynedd. He matriculated at Christ Church, Oxford on 8 June 1703, aged 15. He succeeded to the estate of his elder brother William in March 1715.

Griffith was returned as Whig Member of Parliament for Caernarvonshire in succession to his brother at a by-election on 27 April 1715. He was returned unopposed at the general elections of 1722, 1727 and 1734. He voted for the septennial bill in 1716. During the Sunderland Administration from 1717 to 1720, he may have joined the Whig Opposition like his electoral ally, Thomas Wynn. He consistently supported the Government during Walpole's Administration.

Griffith married Ann Lloyd, daughter of Pierce Lloyd of Lligwy and Llanidan under a settlement dated 18 June 1718 and had one son. His son was still a minor when Griffith died on 6 June 1739, and this ended his family's representation of the county in Parliament.

Parliament of Great Britain
Preceded by William Griffith	Member of Parliament for Caernarvonshire; 1715–1740	Succeeded by John Wynn
