= Sir Thomas Wynn, 1st Baronet =

Welsh noble and politician

Sir Thomas Wynn, 1st Baronet (1677–1749) was a Welsh politician who sat in the House of Commons from 1713 to 1749.

== Personal life ==
Wynn was born in March 1677, the eldest son of Griffith Wynn of Bodvean and his wife Catherine Vaughan, daughter of William Vaughan of Corsygedol, Merioneth. He married Frances Glynn in 1700, she was a daughter of John Glynn of Glynnllivon (1644–69) & Elizabeth, and granddaughter of Sir Hugh Owen, 1st Baronet. Wynn died on 13 April 1749. He had one son and four daughters. He was succeeded in the baronetcy by his son John.

== Political career ==
Wynn was three when he succeeded his father in 1680. In 1712 he became the Sheriff of Caernarvonshire and at the 1713 general election he was returned unopposed as Member of Parliament for Caernarvon Boroughs. He was appointed equerry to the Prince of Wales in 1714 and occupied the post until 1724. He was returned unopposed for Caernarvon in 1715 and in 1722. In 1724 he became Clerk of the Household to the Prince of Wales and Constable of Caernarvon castle, Forester of Snowdon and Steward of Bardsey until 1727. He was returned to Parliament unopposed at the 1727 general election. He also became Clerk of the Green Cloth in 1727 until his death and equerry to George II on his accession to the throne. He was returned again in 1734 and 1741. He was created baronet on 25 October 1742. In 1747 he was returned for Caernarvon for the last time.

After his death, Wynn was replaced as MP for Caernarvon by his brother Sir William Wynn.

== Sources ==
- Burke, Sir Bernard, ed. (1869). A genealogical and heraldic dictionary of the peerage and baronetage of the British Empire. Vol. 31. London : Harrison. p. 819.

Parliament of Great Britain
Preceded by William Griffith	Member of Parliament for Caernarvon Boroughs; 1713–1749	Succeeded by Sir William Wynn
Baronetage of Great Britain
New creation	Baronet (of Bodvean); 1742-1749	Succeeded by John Wynn
