= Thomas Wynn, 1st Baron Newborough =

British politician and peer (1736–1807)

The Right Honourable The Lord Newborough
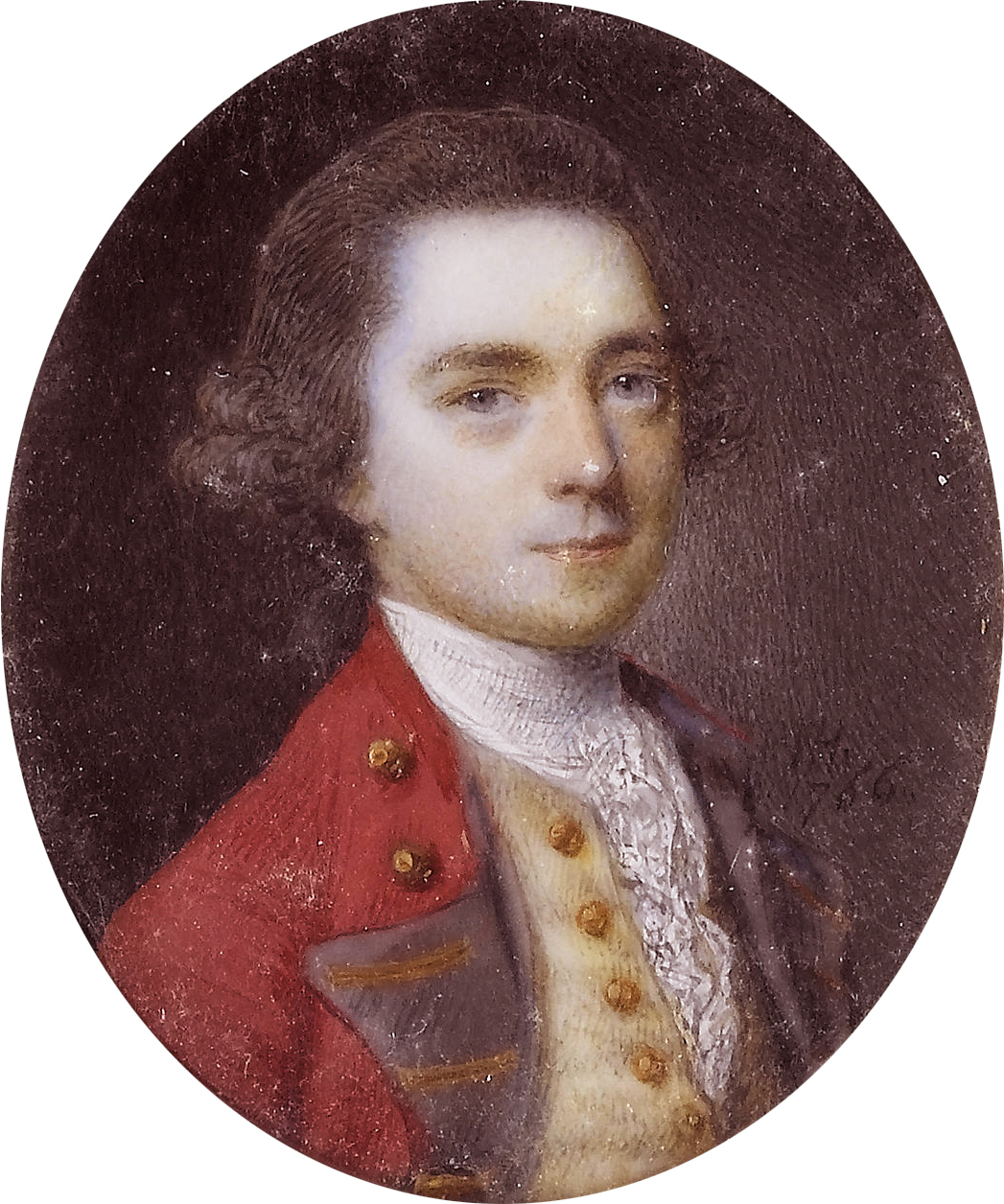
- Thomas Wynn, 1st Baron Newborough (Nathaniel Hone the Elder, 1766)

Member of the Great Britain Parliament for Caernarvonshire
- In office 1761–1774
- Preceded by: Sir John Wynn
- Succeeded by: Thomas Assheton Smith

Member of the Great Britain Parliament for St Ives with: Adam Drummond
- In office 1775–1780
- Preceded by: Adam Drummond; William Praed
- Succeeded by: William Praed; Abel Smith

Member of the Great Britain Parliament for Beaumaris
- In office 1796–1800
- Preceded by: Sir Watkin Williams-Wynn
- Succeeded by: Parliament of the United Kingdom

Member of Parliament for Beaumaris
- In office 1801–1807
- Preceded by: Parliament of Great Britain
- Succeeded by: Edward Pryce Lloyd

Personal details
- Born: 1736
- Died: 12 October 1807 (aged 70–71)
- Spouses: Lady Catherine Perceval (m. 1766; died 1782) Maria Stella Chiappini (m. 1786)
- Children: Thomas Wynn, 2nd Baron Newborough; Spencer Bulkeley Wynn, 3rd Baron Newborough
- Parent: Sir John Wynn, 2nd Baronet
- Occupation: Politician, peer

Thomas Wynn, 1st Baron Newborough (1736 – 12 October 1807), known as Sir Thomas Wynn, 3rd Baronet from 1773 to 1776, was a British politician and peer who sat in the House of Commons between 1761 and 1807.

== Career ==
Wynn was the son of Sir John Wynn, 2nd Baronet. He undertook the Grand Tour in Italy in 1759–60. He sat as a Member of Parliament for Caernarvonshire from 1761 to 1774, for St Ives from 1775 to 1780, and for Beaumaris from 1796 to 1807. He served as Lord Lieutenant of Caernarvonshire between 1761 and 1781 and raised and commanded the Carnarvon Militia. Wynn succeeded his father in the baronetcy in 1773 and in 1776 was raised to the Peerage of Ireland as Baron Newborough, of Newborough.

== Marriages and children ==
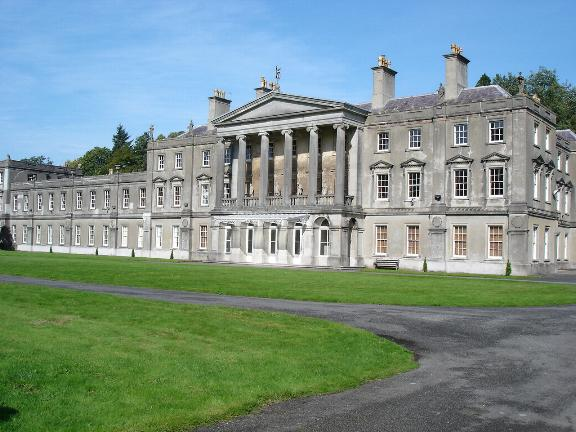
Plas Glynllifon, seat of the Lords Newborough

Lord Newborough married, firstly, Lady Catherine Perceval, daughter of John Perceval, 2nd Earl of Egmont, in 1766. The couple had one child:

- Hon. John Wynn (27 April 1772 – 18 December 1800)

After Lady Catherine's death in 1782, Lord Newborough married, secondly, Maria Stella Petronilla, officially recorded as the daughter of Lorenzo Chiappini but possibly a member of the House of Orléans, in 1786. Maria Stella was born at Modigliana, near Forlì, Italy, in 1773. The couple had two sons:

- Thomas John Wynn, 2nd Baron Newborough (3 April 1802 – 15 November 1832)
- Spencer Bulkeley Wynn, 3rd Baron Newborough (23 May 1803 – 1 November 1888)

Lord Newborough died on 12 October 1807 and was succeeded in his titles by his elder son from his second marriage, Thomas. Lady Newborough later remarried, becoming Baroness Ungern-Sternberg, and died in 1843.

== Notes ==
Parliament of Great Britain
Preceded by Sir John Wynn	Member of Parliament for Caernarvonshire; 1761–1774	Succeeded by Thomas Assheton Smith
Preceded by Adam Drummond; William Praed	Member of Parliament for St Ives; 1775–1780; With: Adam Drummond	Succeeded by William Praed; Abel Smith
Preceded by Sir Watkin Williams-Wynn	Member of Parliament for Beaumaris; 1796–1800	Succeeded by Parliament of the United Kingdom
Parliament of the United Kingdom
Preceded by Parliament of Great Britain	Member of Parliament for Beaumaris; 1801–1807	Succeeded by Edward Pryce Lloyd
Honorary titles
Preceded by The Earl of Cholmondeley	Lord Lieutenant of Caernarvonshire; 1761–1781	Succeeded by The Viscount Bulkeley
Preceded by Sir John Wynn, Bt	Custos Rotulorum of Caernarvonshire; 1773–1781	Succeeded by The Viscount Bulkeley
Peerage of Ireland
New creation	Baron Newborough; 1776–1807	Succeeded by Thomas John Wynn
Baronetage of Great Britain
Preceded by John Wynn	Baronet (of Bodvean); 1773–1807	Succeeded by Thomas John Wynn
