= Maria Stella =

Italian-born memoirist

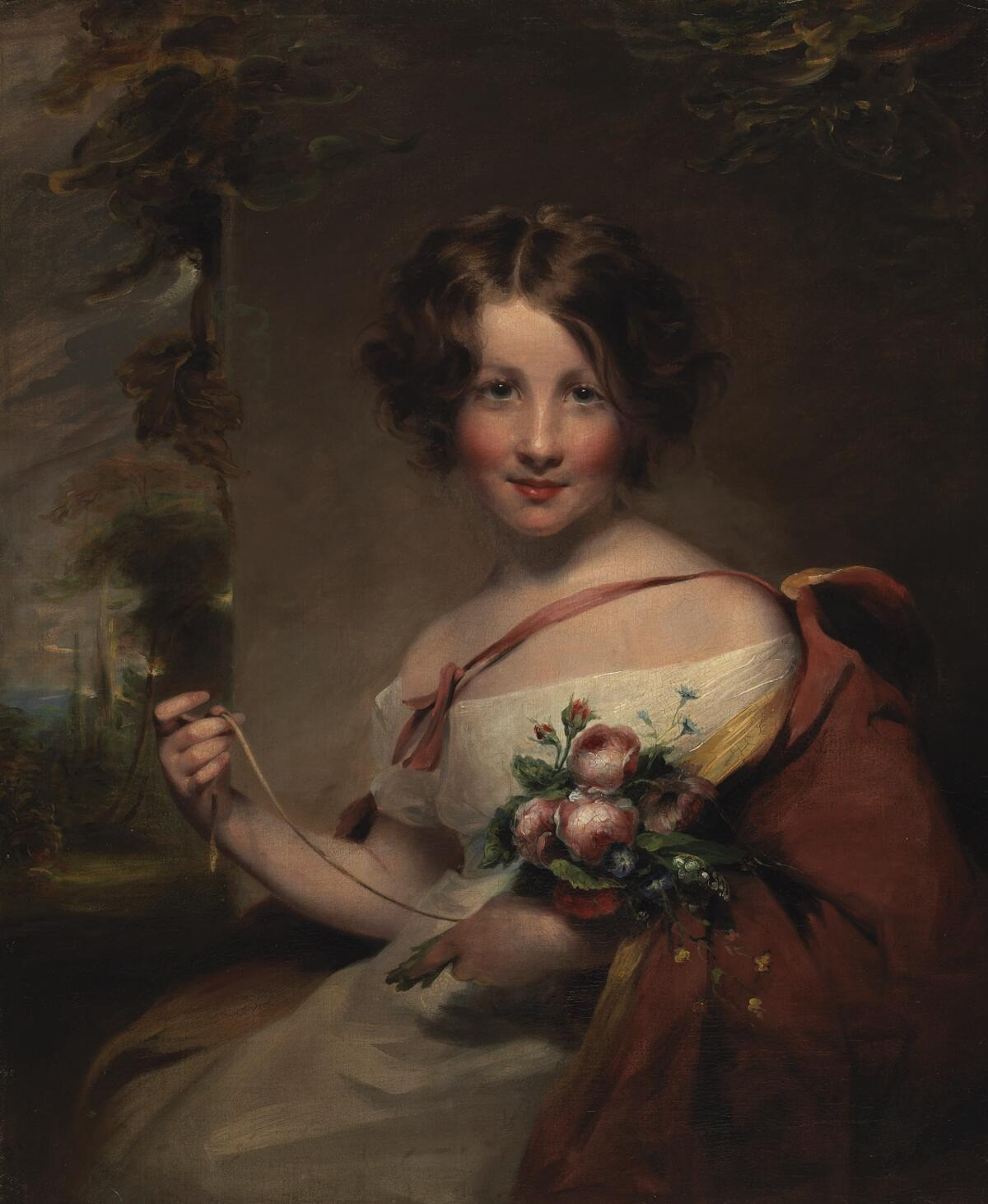
- Maria Stella Petronilla
- Born: Maria Stella Petronilla Chiappini; 16 April 1773; Modigliana, Italy
- Died: 23 December 1843 (aged 70); Paris, France
- Other names: Marchesina of Modigliana; Maria Stella Wynn, Lady Newborough; Maria Stella, Baroness Ungern-Sternberg; Maria Stella Ungern-Sternberg; Marie Étoile d'Orléans
- Occupation: Memoirist
- Spouses: Thomas Wynn, 1st Baron Newborough; Baron Eduard von Ungern-Sternberg (m. 1810)
- Children: Thomas Wynn, 2nd Baron Newborough; Spencer Bulkeley Wynn, 3rd Baron Newborough; Baron Edward von Ungern-Sternberg

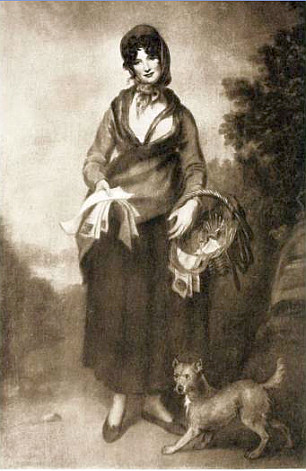
Maria Stella, Lady Newborough, as a gypsy

Maria Stella Wynn, Lady Newborough (later Baroness Ungern-Sternberg; née Chiappini; 16 April 1773 – 23 December 1843) was an Italian-born memoirist, the self-styled legitimate daughter of Louis Philippe II, Duke of Orléans. She was the second wife of the Welsh peer Thomas Wynn, 1st Baron Newborough, after whose death she married the Estonian Baron Heinrich George Eduard von Ungern-Sternberg.

According to her, King Louis Philippe I was not the son of Philippe, Duke of Orléans, but a supposititious child, his father being one Lorenzo Chiappini, a constable at the town of Modigliana in Emilia Romagna. The story is that the Duke and Duchess of Orléans, travelling under the incognito of Comte and Comtesse de Joinville, were at this town on 16 April 1773, when the duchess gave birth to a daughter; and that the duke, desiring a son in order to prevent the rich Penthièvre inheritance from reverting to his wife's relations in the event of her death, bribed the Chiappinis to substitute their newborn male child for his own.

== Life ==
Maria Stella Petronilla Chiappini was born to an ordinary Italian family in 1773, in a small town (later city) of the Grand Duchy of Tuscany called Modigliana, near Forlì. According to Maria's autobiography, she was treated poorly by her mother as a child, while her brothers and sisters gained all the attention. Years later, after the death of her father, who had sent her a letter confessing that he was indeed not her biological father, she understood the treatment that she had been given by her mother and Countess Camilla Borghi's kindness towards her.

Maria Stella, the supposed daughter of Chiappini, went on the stage at Florence, where her putative parents had settled. There, on 10 October 1786 at the age of thirteen, she became the wife of Thomas Wynn, 1st Baron Newborough. The couple had two sons:

- Thomas John Wynn, 2nd Baron Newborough (3 April 1802 – 15 November 1832)
- Spencer Bulkeley Wynn, 3rd Baron Newborough (23 May 1803 – 1 November 1888)

After Lord Newborough's death, she married on 11 September 1810 the Estonian Baron Eduard Ungern-Sternberg (9 October 1782 – 17 May 1861) at St. Michael's Church in Coxwold. They had one child:

- Baron Edward von Ungern-Sternberg (17 August 1811 – 6 January 1842)

On the death of her putative father in 1821, she received a letter, written by him shortly before his death, in which he confessed that she was not his daughter, adding "Heaven has repaired my fault, since you are in a better position than your real father, though he was of almost similar rank" (i.e. a French nobleman). Maria Stella henceforward devoted her time and fortune to establishing her identity.

Her first success was the judgment of the episcopal court at Faenza, which in 1824 declared that the Comte Louis de Joinville exchanged his daughter for the son of Lorenzo Chiappini, and that the Demoiselle de Joinville had been baptised as Maria Stella, with the false statement that she was the daughter of L Chiappini and his wife. The discovery that Joinville was a countship of the Orléans family, and a real or fancied resemblance of Louis Philippe to Chiappini, convinced her that the duke of Orleans was the person for whose sake she had been cheated of her birthright, a conviction strengthened by the striking resemblance which many people discovered in her to the princesses of the Orléans family.

In 1830, she published her proofs under the title Maria Stella ou un échange d'une demoiselle du plus haut rang contre un garçon de plus vile condition (reprinted 1839 and 1849). This coincided with the advent of Louis Philippe to the throne, and her claim became a weapon for those who wished to throw discredit and ridicule on the bourgeois monarch. He, for his part, treated the whole thing with amused contempt, and Baroness Newborough-Sternburg de Joinville, or Marie Étoile d'Orléans, as she called herself, was suffered to live in Paris until on 23 December 1843 she died in poverty and obscurity.

== Analysis ==
In spite of much discussion and investigation, the case of Maria Stella remains one of the unsolved problems of history, but it could be solved today by DNA, as there are direct descendants of all those involved. Sir Ralph Payne Gallwey's Mystery of Maria Stella, Lady Newborough (London, 1907), is founded on her own accounts and argues in favour of her point of view.

An alternative view is Maurice Vitrac's Philippe-Egalité et M. Chiappini (Paris, 1907), which is based on unpublished material in the Archives nationales. Vitrac seeks to overthrow Maria Stella's case by an alibi. The duke and duchess of Chartres could not have been at Modigliana in April 1773, for the simple reason that they can be proved at that time to have been in Paris. On 8 April the duke, according to the official Gazette de France, took part in the Maundy Thursday ceremonies at Versailles; from 7 April to 14 April he was in constant attendance at the lodge of Freemasons of which he had just been elected grand master. Moreover, it was impossible for the first prince of the blood royal to leave France without royal permission, and his absence would certainly have been remarked. Lastly, the duchess's accouchement, a semi-public function in the case of royal princesses, did not take place till 6 October. Vitrac identifies the real father of Maria Stella with Count Carlo Battaglini of Rimini, who died in 1796 without issue; the case being not one of substitution, but of ordinary farming out to avoid a scandal.

== Legacy ==
In 2017, the city council of Modigliana set up a programme of events to commemorate the figure of Maria Stella, including conferences, lectures, studies and a historical theatre drama written and directed by L.A. Mazzoni and played by actors of Filodrammatica Berton. There is now a plaque commemorating the event on the Palazzo Pretorio where the exchange is alleged to have taken place. It consists of a relief with figures of the Count and Countess of Joinville and Lorenzo and Vincentia Chiappini handing babies to each other.
