= Glynllifon =

Neoclassical Welsh mansion and park

Coordinates: 53°04′24″N 04°18′18″W

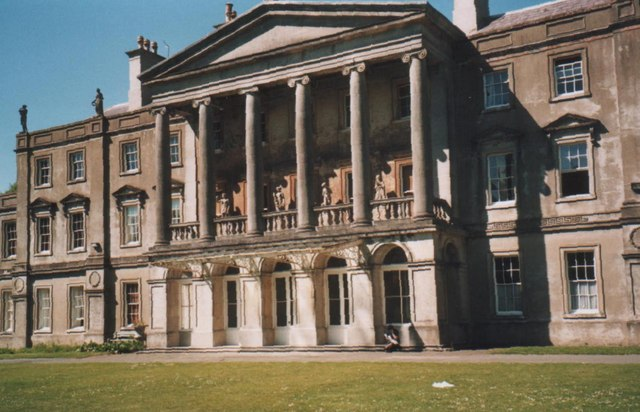
Plas Glynllifon, the grand portico

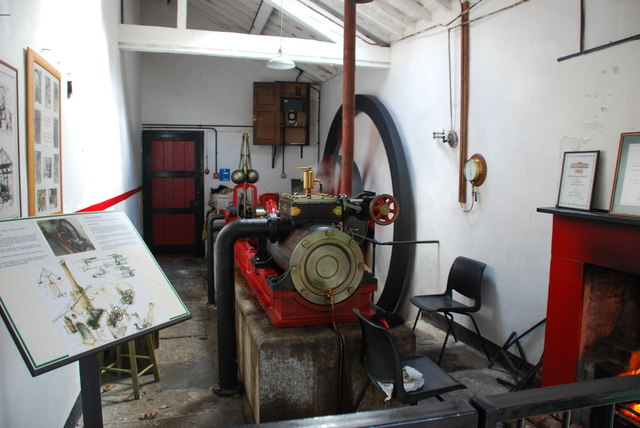
The famous steam engine

Glynllifon is an old estate on the main A499 road between Pwllheli and Caernarfon in Gwynedd, Wales, near the village of Llandwrog. It formerly belonged to the Barons Newborough. The 19th-century mansion house, Plas Glynllifon, is a Grade I listed building, while the park is open to the public and includes an agricultural college, Coleg Glynllifon.

== Parc Glynllifon ==
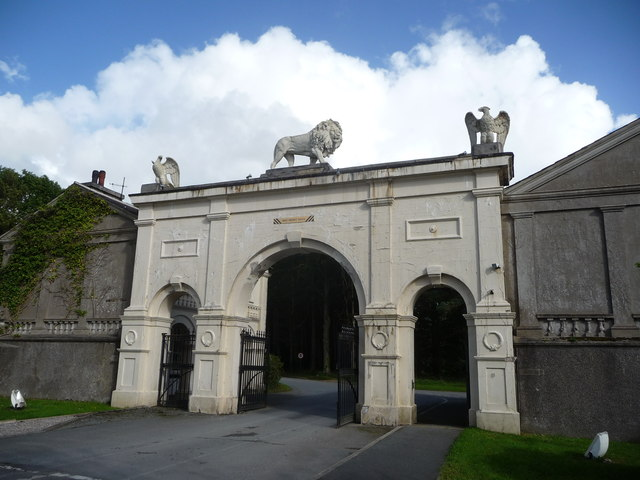
Gateway at the main entrance

The greater part of the original park, Parc Glynllifon, now includes Coleg Glynllifon agricultural college, craft workshops and many educational facilities. There are also a cafe and maze at the entrance, and exhibits such as an 1854 De Winton horizontal stationary steam engine and Cornish boiler, which were restored by Fred Dibnah, can be seen. Many fairs are held in Glynllifon Park car park, especially steam and craft fairs.

The park is open to the public and includes gardens of historical and scientific importance; they have been designated Historical Garden (Grade I) status as well as a Site of Special Scientific Interest by Cadw and the Countryside Council for Wales.

Glynllifon is also a designated Special Area of Conservation under Annex II by the Joint Nature Conservation Committee. It is home to the Lesser horseshoe bat, Rhinolophus hipposideros. This 189.27 hectare site is both a maternity and hibernation site for about 6% of the UK population.

The Eryri Urdd National Eisteddfod took place at Glynllifon from 4 to 9 June 2012.

=== Fort Williamsburg ===
The park contains a small fort dating from the 18th century.

== Plas Glynllifon ==
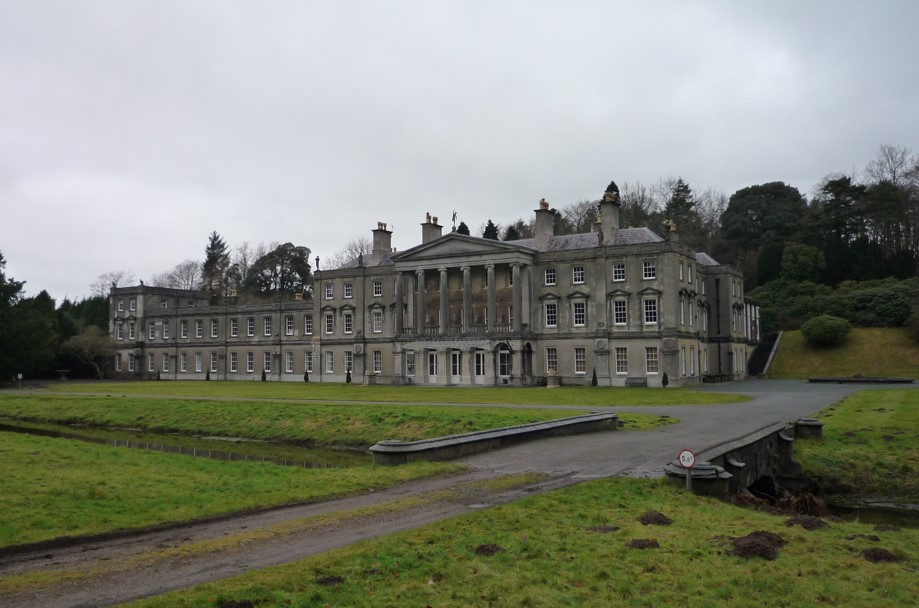
Plas Glynllifon

The present mansion house, Plas Glynllifon, was built in 1836–1848 to the designs of Edward Haycock, a Shrewsbury architect, and succeeded at least three previous houses on the site. The original building predated a rebuilding c.1600, which itself was rebuilt in 1751. That house, a 'moderate-sized brick mansion', was destroyed by a major fire in 1836. The rebuilding that followed and an extension in 1889-1890 largely form the house that exists today.

The house is a neoclassical 3-storey building with an attached lower service courtyard to the west and a symmetrical 13-bay south-facing facade dominated by a central hexastyle pedimented portico. It is built of stone with rendered elevations under a slate roof with rendered chimney stacks topped by moulded cornices and an Italianate water tank. It contains 102 rooms. It is a Grade I listed building.

Glynllifon was the seat of the Glynn family until 1700, when it passed to the Wynn family of Bodvean. Sir Thomas John Wynn became the 1st Baron Newborough in 1776 and in 1888 Glynllifon passed down the family to Frederick George Wynn (1853-1932), the youngest son of Spencer Bukeley, 3rd Lord Newborough. In 1932 the estate reverted to Thomas John Wynn (1878-1957), 5th Baron Newborough, brother of William Charles Wynn (1873-1916), 4th Baron Newborough.

In 1948 the house was sold to a timber merchant and in 1954 the house and park were sold to Caernarfonshire County Council and used as offices and dormitories for the Glynllifon Agricultural College. In 1969 Plas Glynllifon played host to the Ball of the Investiture of the Prince of Wales held at Caernarfon Castle.

From 2000, the house was privately owned by several people. A partial renovation was carried out with the intention of converting it into a hotel. In 2016 it changed hands and underwent a more thorough renovation, the owners planning to create a five-star country house hotel and wedding venue. In January 2020 it was announced that the business was again in the hands of receivers. In June 2022 Plas Glynllifon was bought by Davis Savage, a Manchester developer, who put it up for sale in 2024. In April 2026, a cannabis growing operation was discovered in twelve rooms of the house.

== See also ==
- List of gardens in Wales
- Grade I listed buildings in Gwynedd
