= A Tour in Scotland, 1769 =

1771 travel book by Thomas Pennant

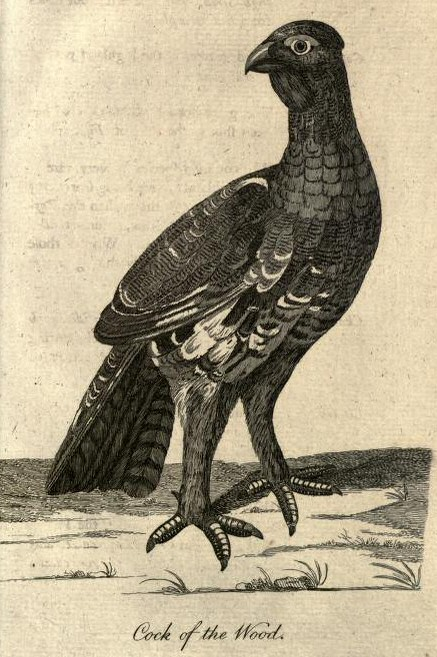
Illustration of a capercaillie from the volume

A Tour in Scotland, 1769 was published in 1771. It is written, between July and August 1769, by Thomas Pennant and illustrated by Moses Griffiths, who travelled together. Despite the book's title, the tour began in England and finished in Wales: in Chester and at Downing Hall, respectively.

Pennant set a new standard in travel literature: Samuel Johnson (whose own travelogue was inspired by A Tour in Scotland) said of him: "He's the best traveller I ever read; he observes more things than anyone else does".

In May 1773, Pennant said of his work: "I beg to be considered not as a Topographer but as a curious traveller willing to collect all that a traveller may be supposed to do in his voyage; I am the first that attempted travels at home, therefore earnestly wish for accuracy."

Pennant was a naturalist, and many of his observations were of the flora and fauna, but he also wrote about other subjects, including economics and what would now be considered anthropology.

Besides its effect on travel writing, the work had an effect on the shifting national identities of the time.

== External sources ==
- A Tour in Scotland, 1769 full text at the Internet Archive (published 1771; the tour described was in 1769).
