= Moses Griffith =

Moses Griffith may refer to:

- Moses Griffith (physician) (1724–1785), English physician
- Moses Griffith or Gruffydd, co-founder of Plaid Cymru
- Moses Griffith (artist), Welsh draughtsman, engraver, and water colourist
