= Peter Paillou (the younger) =

English painter

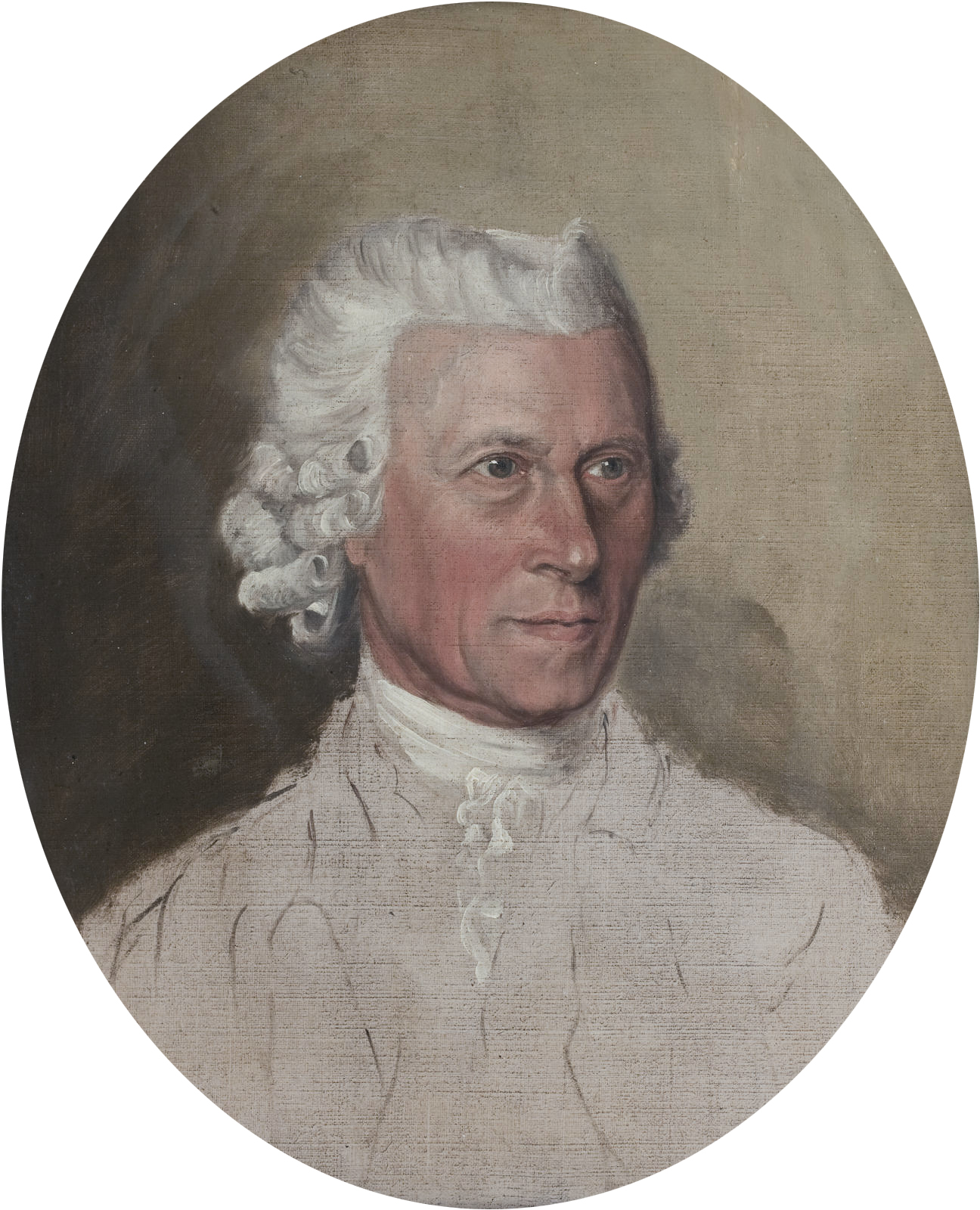
- Self portrait
- Born: 1757
- Died: 1831 or 1832
- Known for: Portrait painting

Peter Paillou (1757–1831 or 1832) was a British painter of portraits including miniatures.

== Life and work ==
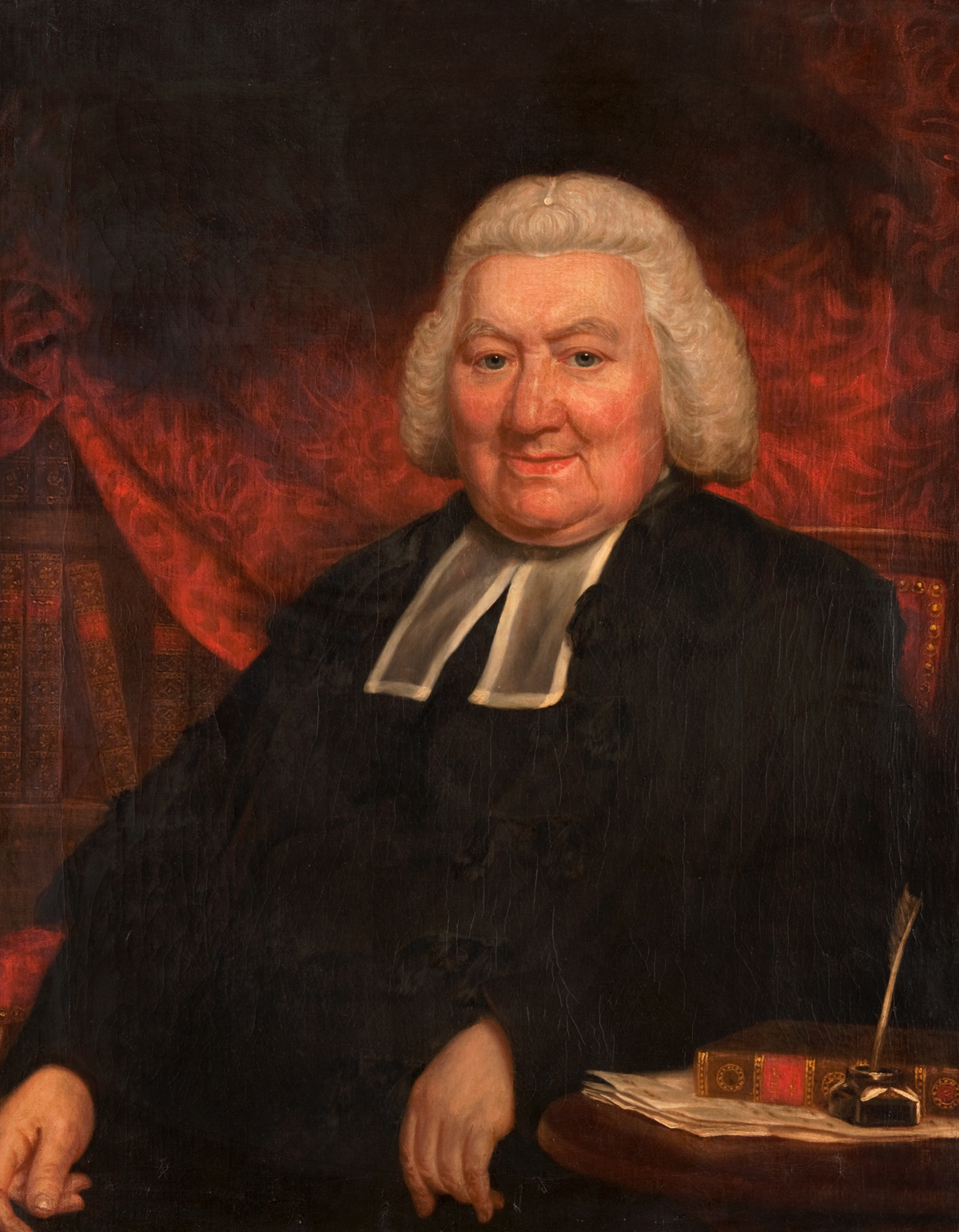
Painting in oils of Professor of Divinity at Glasgow, Robert Findlay (1721–1814), 1807. Hunterian Art Gallery, University of Glasgow.

Paillou was the son of a natural history painter and illustrator also named Peter Paillou, who is believed to have been born in France before migrating to England.

He practised in London for 20 years before moving to Glasgow for some years, where an 1803 advertisement states that he charged eight guineas for a miniature and ten guineas for a three-quarter length portrait in oils.

== Works in national collections ==
- National Portrait Gallery (Mary, Queen of Scots; Ralph Wardlaw)
- Victoria and Albert Museum (William Rowley, miniatures)
- Art UK (Ann Ruthven Leven Bell, Robert Findlay)
- Fitzwilliam Museum (Susannah Wedgwood, the mother of Charles Darwin)
