= Thomas Pennant =

Welsh naturalist (1726–1798)

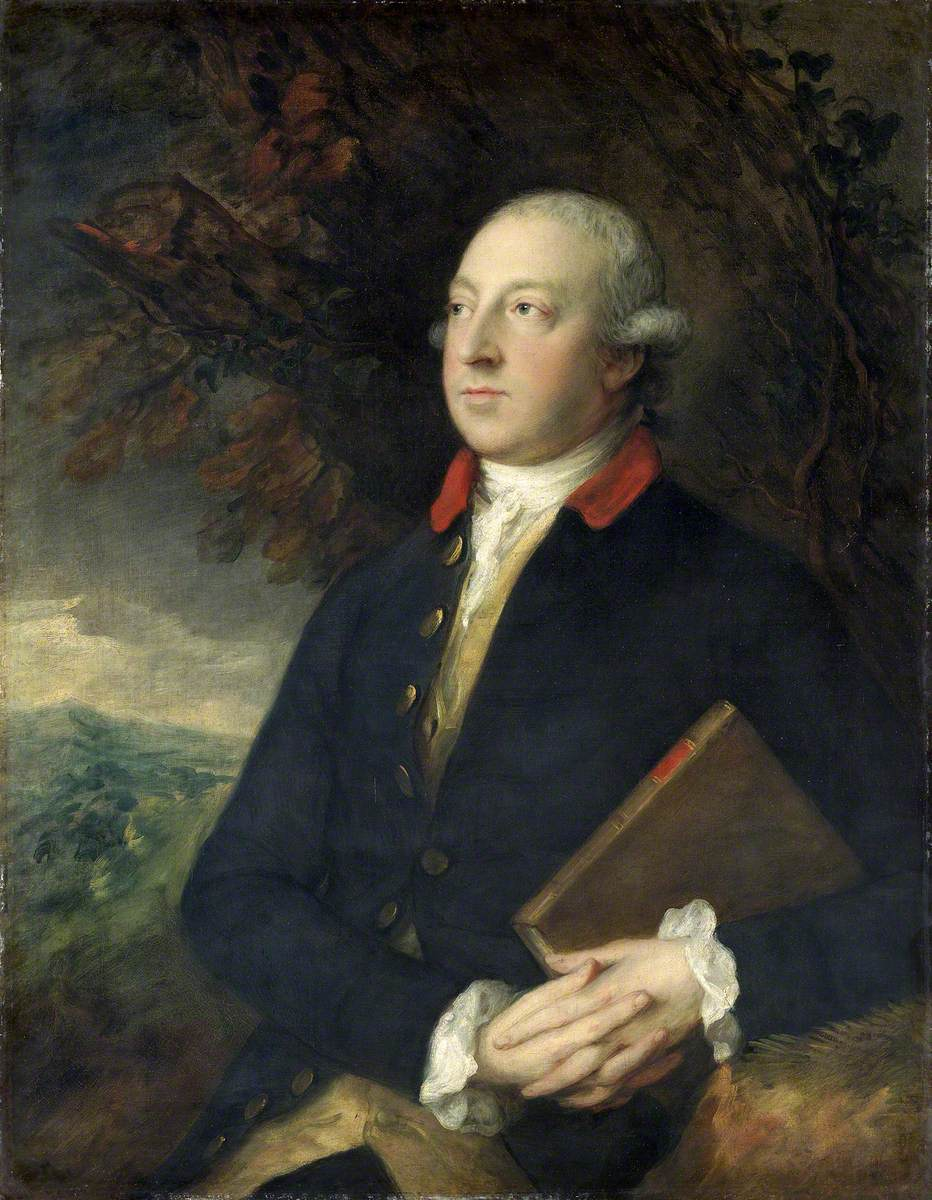
- 1776 portrait of Pennant by Thomas Gainsborough
- Born: 27 June [O.S. 16 June] 1726; Downing Hall, Whitford, Flintshire, Wales
- Died: 16 December 1798 (aged 72); Downing Hall, Whitford, Flintshire, Wales
- Occupations: Naturalist; antiquarian
- Known for: Writings on natural history, geology, and geographical expeditions

Thomas Pennant (27 June [O.S. 16 June] 1726 – 16 December 1798) was a Welsh naturalist, traveller, writer and antiquarian. He was born and lived his whole life at his family estate, Downing Hall, near Whitford, Flintshire, in Wales.

As a naturalist he had a great curiosity, observing the geography, geology, plants, animals, birds, reptiles, amphibians, and fish around him and recording what he saw and heard about. He wrote acclaimed books including British Zoology, the History of Quadrupeds, Arctic Zoology and Indian Zoology although he never travelled further afield than continental Europe. He knew and maintained correspondence with many of the scientific figures of his day. His books influenced the writings of Samuel Johnson. As an antiquarian, he amassed a considerable collection of art and other works, largely selected for their scientific interest. Many of these works are now housed at the National Library of Wales.

As a traveller he visited Scotland and many other parts of Britain and wrote about them. Many of his travels took him to places that were little known to the British public and the travelogues he produced, accompanied by painted and engraved colour plates, were much appreciated. Each tour started at his home and related in detail the route, the scenery, the habits and activities of the people he met, their customs and superstitions, and the wildlife he saw or heard about. He travelled on horseback accompanied by his servant, Moses Griffith, who sketched the things they encountered and later worked these up into illustrations for the books. He was an amiable man with a large circle of friends and was still busily following his interests into his sixties. He enjoyed good health throughout his life and died at Downing at the age of seventy-two.

== Family background ==
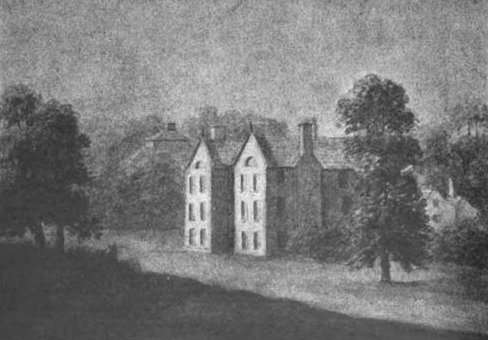
Downing Hall, Pennant's lifelong home

The Pennants were a family of Welsh gentry from the parish of Whitford, Flintshire, who had built up a modest estate at Bychton by the seventeenth century. In 1724 Thomas' father, David Pennant, inherited the neighbouring Downing estate from a cousin, considerably augmenting the family's fortune. Downing Hall, where Thomas was born in the 'yellow room', became the main Pennant residence. This house had been built in 1600 and the front and main entrance were set back between two forward-facing wings. By the time the Pennants moved there, it was in a state of disrepair and many alterations were set in hand. It had many fine rooms including a well-stocked library and a smoking room "most antiquely furnished with ancient carvings, and the horns of all the European beasts of chase". The grounds were also very overgrown and much effort was put into their improvement and the creation of paths, vistas, and pleasure gardens.

Pennant received his early education at Wrexham Grammar School, before moving to Thomas Croft's school in Fulham in 1740. At the age of twelve, Pennant later recalled, he had been inspired with a passion for natural history through being presented with Francis Willughby's Ornithology. In 1744 he entered Queen's College, Oxford, later moving to Oriel College. Like many students from a wealthy background, he left Oxford without taking a degree, although in 1771 his work as a zoologist was recognised with an honorary degree.

Pennant married Elizabeth Falconer, the daughter of Lieutenant James Falconer of the Royal Navy, in 1759 and they had a son, David Pennant, born in 1763. Pennant's wife died the following year and fourteen years later he married Ann Mostyn of Mostyn Hall, daughter of Sir Thomas Mostyn, 4th Baronet of Mostyn, Flintshire.

== Interests ==
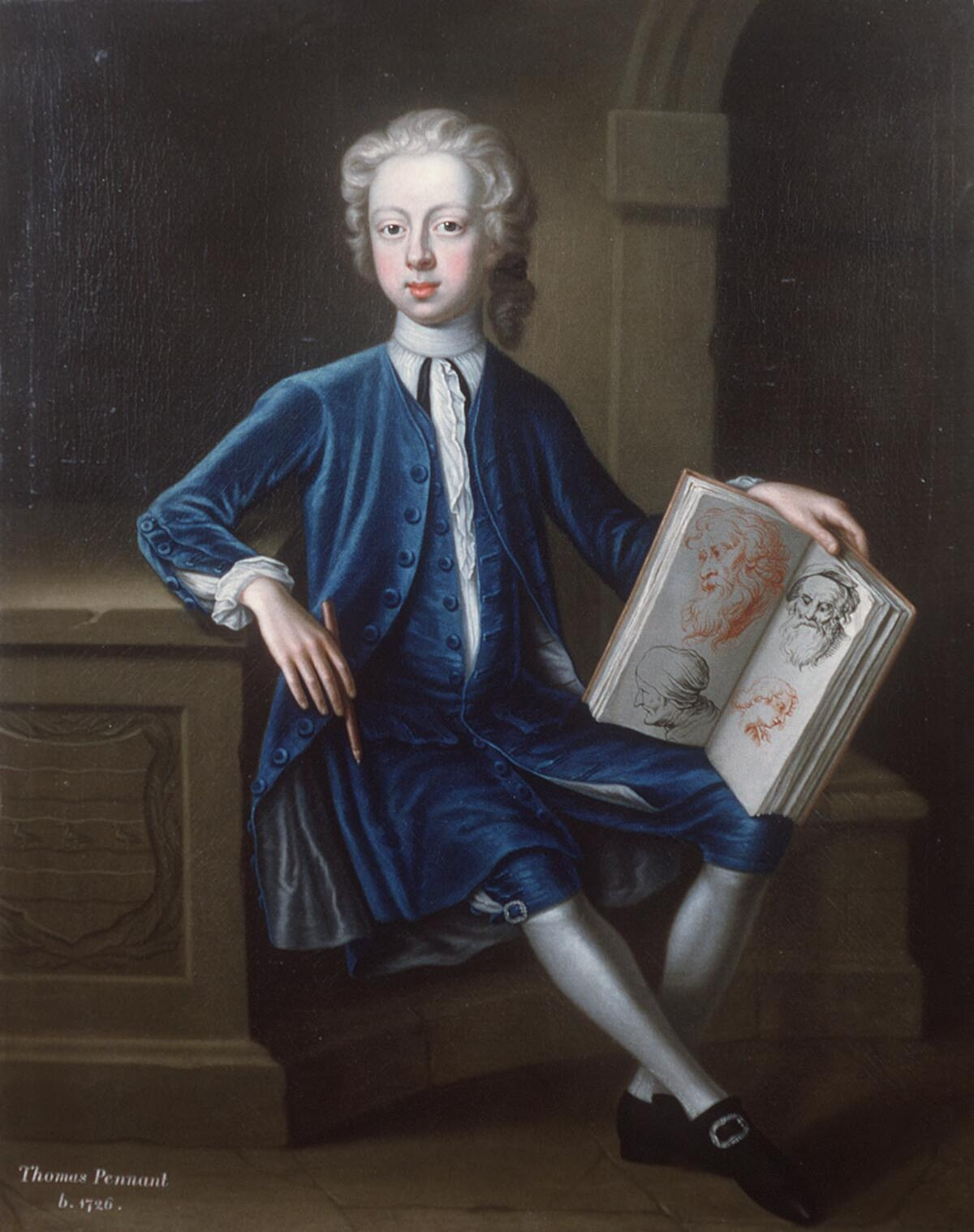
A young Thomas Pennant, c. 1740

A visit to Cornwall in 1746–47, where he met the antiquary and naturalist William Borlase, awakened an interest in minerals and fossils which formed his main scientific study during the 1750s. In 1750, his account of an earthquake at Downing was inserted in the Philosophical Transactions of the Royal Society, where there also appeared in 1756 a paper on several coralloid bodies he had collected at Coalbrookdale, Shropshire. More practically, Pennant used his geological knowledge to open a lead mine, which helped to finance improvements at Downing after he had inherited the estate in 1763.

In 1754, he was elected a fellow of the Society of Antiquaries but by 1760 he was happily married and resigned his fellowship because "my circumstances at that time were very narrow, my worthy father being alive, and I vainly thought my happiness would have been permanent, and that I never should have been called again from my retirement to amuse myself in town, or to be of use to the society." When his financial circumstances later improved, he became a patron and collector. He amassed a considerable collection of works of art, many of which had been commissioned and which were selected for their scientific interest rather than their connoisseur value. He had several works by Nicholas Pocock representing topographical landforms, mostly in Wales, and others by the artist Peter Paillou, probably commissioned, representing different climate types. His portrait by Thomas Gainsborough shows him as a country gentleman. Also included in the "Pennant Collection", housed at the National Library of Wales, are many watercolours by Moses Griffith and John Ingleby, and some drawings by Pennant himself.

The artist Moses Griffith, a native of Bryncroes in the Llŷn Peninsula, provided illustrations to most of Pennant's books. He was employed full-time by Pennant and accommodated at Downing. Many of these paintings are included in the Pennant Collection held by the National Museum of Wales. Another artist whom Pennant employed on an occasional basis was John Ingleby of Halkyn. He mostly supplied town scenes and vignettes.

Pennant was an improving landowner and active defender of the established order in church and state. He served as high sheriff of Flintshire in 1761, and actively opposed popular agitation for parliamentary reform. In 1784 he supported the prosecution of William Davies Shipley, the Dean of St Asaph, for seditious libel.

== Scientific work and publications ==
=== Early works ===
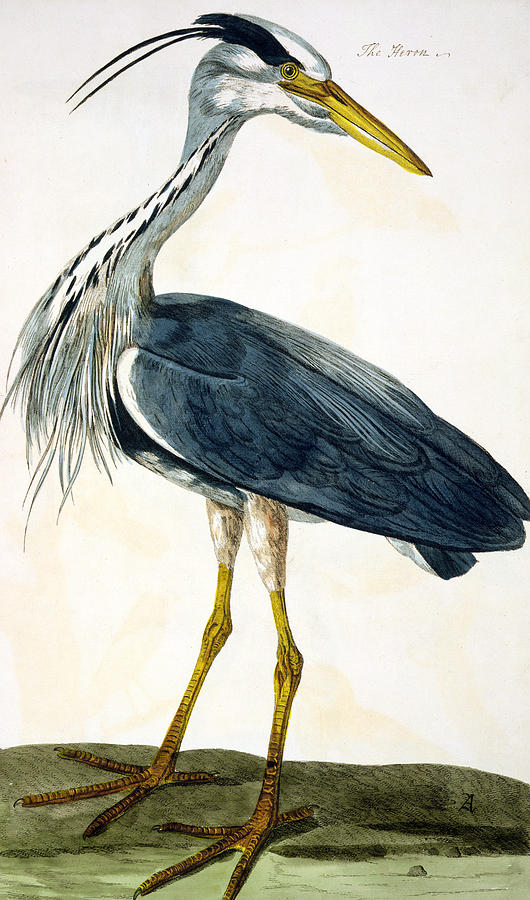
"The Heron" engraved by Peter Mazell from painting by Peter Paillou, in Pennant's British Zoology

Pennant's first publications were scientific papers on the earthquake he had experienced, other geological subjects and palaeontology. One of these so impressed Carl Linnaeus, that in 1757, he put Pennant's name forward and he was duly elected a member of the Royal Swedish Society of Sciences. Pennant felt very honoured by this and continued to correspond with Linnaeus throughout his life.

Observing that naturalists in other European countries were producing volumes describing the animals found in their territories, Pennant started, in 1761, a similar work about Britain, to be called British Zoology. This was a comprehensive book with 132 folio plates in colour. It was published in 1766 and 1767 in four volumes as quarto editions, and further small editions followed. The illustrations were so expensive to produce that he made little money from the publication, and when there was a profit, he gave it to charity. For example, the bookseller Benjamin White, brother of the naturalist Gilbert White, received permission, on payment of £100, to publish an octavo edition, and the money thus raised was donated to the Welsh Charity School. Further appendix volumes were added later and the text, largely written from personal observations, was translated into Latin and German. The observations Pennant recorded in British Zoology were sufficiently detailed and accurate that it was possible to use them to recreate a modern ecological study that had used a decade's worth of laboratory-based molecular data.(subscription required)

The book took several years to write and during that time, Pennant was struck by personal tragedy when his wife died. Soon afterwards, in February 1765 and apparently as a reaction, he set out on a journey to the continent of Europe, starting in France where he met other naturalists and scientists including the Comte de Buffon, Voltaire, who he described as a "wicked wit", Haller and Pallas, and they continued to correspond to their mutual advantage. He later complained that the Comte used several of his communications on animals in his Histoire Naturelle without properly attributing them to Pennant. His meeting with Pallas was significant, because it led Pennant to write his Synopsis of Quadrupeds. He and Pallas found each other's company particularly congenial, and both were great admirers of the English naturalist John Ray. The intention was that Pallas would write the book but, having written an outline of what he planned, he got called away by the Empress Catherine the Great to her court at St Petersburg. At her request he led a "philosophical expedition" into her distant territories that lasted six years, so Pennant took over the project.

In 1767 Pennant was elected a fellow of the Royal Society. About this time he met the much-travelled Sir Joseph Banks and visited him at his home in Lincolnshire. Banks presented him with the skin of a new species of penguin recently brought back from the Falkland Islands. Pennant wrote an account of this bird, the king penguin (Aptenodytes patagonicus), and all the other known species of penguin which was published in the Philosophical Transactions of the Royal Society.

=== Tours in Scotland ===
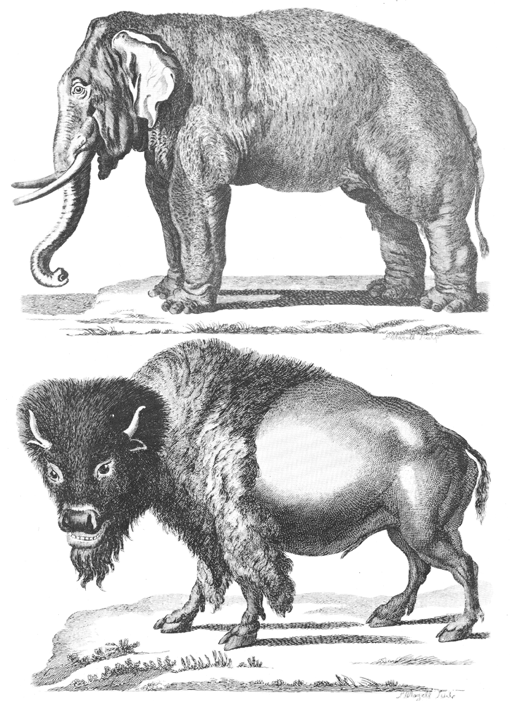
Elephant and bison, from the History of Quadrupeds (1793)

While work on the Synopsis of Quadrupeds was still in progress, Pennant decided on a journey to Scotland, a relatively unexplored country and not previously visited by a naturalist. He set out in June 1769 and kept a journal and made sketches as he travelled. He visited the Farne Islands off the Northumberland coast on the way and was much impressed by the breeding seabird colonies. He entered Scotland via Berwick-on-Tweed and proceeded via Edinburgh and up the east coast, continuing through Perth, Aberdeen and Inverness. His return journey south took him through Fort William, Glen Awe, Inverary and Glasgow. He was unimpressed by the climate but was interested in all he saw and made enquiries about the local economy. He described in detail the scenery around Loch Ness. He enthused over the Arctic char, a fish new to him but did not mention a monster in the lake. He observed red deer, black grouse, white hares and ptarmigan. He saw the capercaillie in the forests of Glenmoriston and Strathglass and mentioned the pine grosbeak, the only occasion on which it has been recorded from Scotland. He enquired into the fisheries and commerce of the different places he passed through and visited the great houses, reporting on the antiquities he found there. He finished his journey by visiting Edinburgh again and travelling through Moffat, Gretna and Carlisle on his way back to Wales, having taken about three months on his travels. On his return home, Pennant wrote an account of his tour in Scotland which met with some acclaim and which may have been responsible for an increase in the number of English people visiting the country.

In 1771 his Synopsis of Quadrupeds was published; a second edition was expanded into a History of Quadrupeds. At the end of that same year, 1771, he published A Tour in Scotland, 1769. This proved so popular that he decided to undertake another journey and in the summer of 1772, set out from Chester with two companions, the Rev. John Lightfoot, a naturalist, and Rev. J. Stewart, a Scotsman knowledgeable in the customs of the country. They travelled through the Lake District, Carlisle, Eskdale, which Pennant much admired, Dumfries and Glasgow. In passing, he was fascinated by the account of the inundation of the surrounding farmland by a bursting out of the Solway Moss peatbog. The party set sail in a ninety-ton cutter from Greenock to explore the outer isles. They first visited Bute and Arran and then continued to Ailsa Craig. Pennant was interested in the birds, frogs and molluscs and considered their distribution. The boat then rounded the Mull of Kintyre and continued to Gigha. They would have continued to Islay but were becalmed. During this enforced idleness, the ever-industrious Pennant started on his ancient history of the Hebrides. When the wind picked up they continued to Jura.

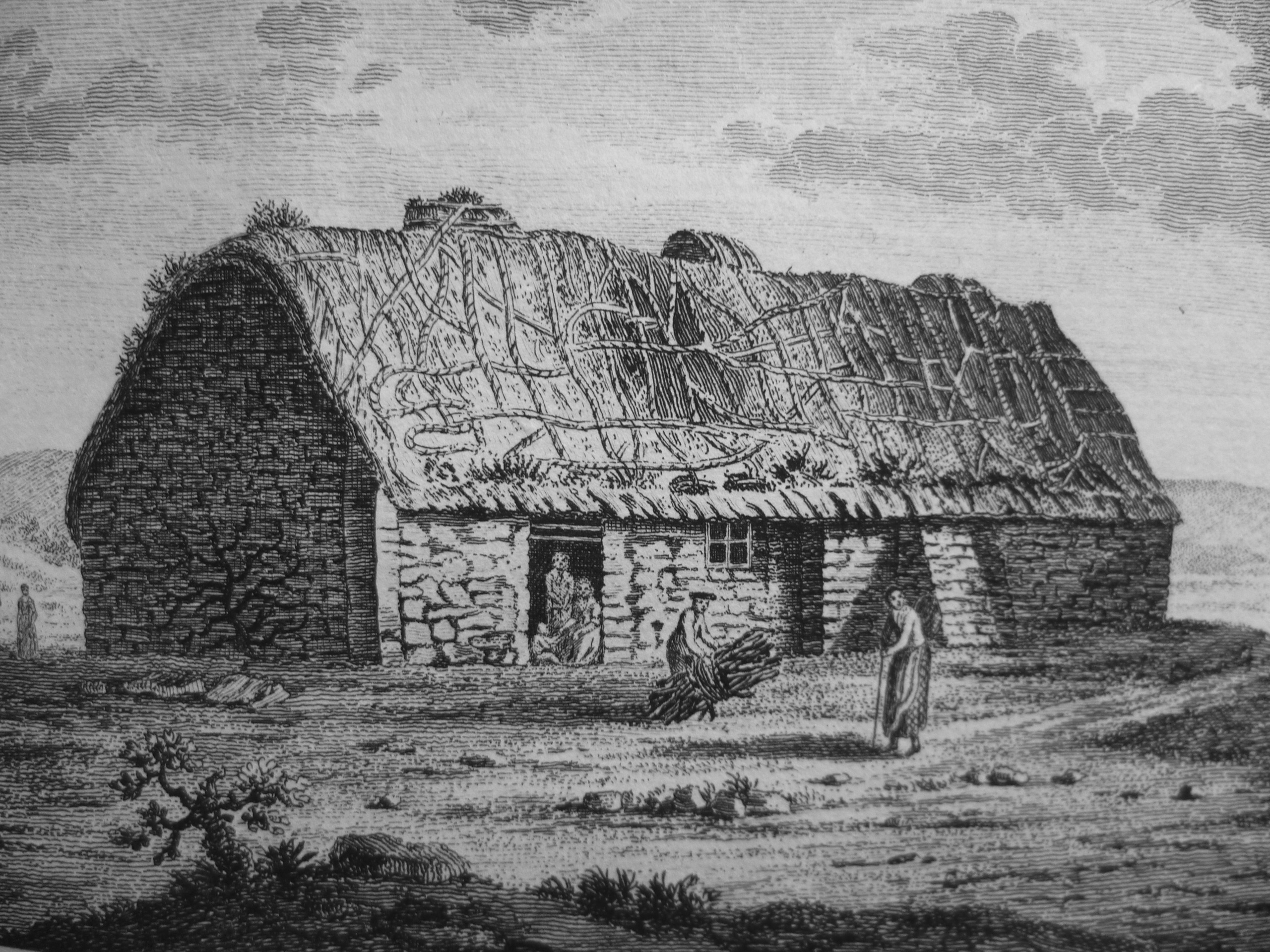
Cottage on Islay, by John Cleveley the Younger, in Pennant's A Tour in Scotland, and Voyage to the Hebrides 1772

Here, as elsewhere, they were hospitably welcomed, lent horses to explore the island and shown the principal sights and the improvements that had been made. Pennant records the scenery, customs and superstitions of the inhabitants with many an anecdote. They later reached Islay where Pennant found geese nesting on the moors, a more southerly nesting site for geese than had previously been recorded. Their journey next took them to Colonsay, Iona and Canna and eventually to Mull and Skye. A projected journey to Staffa was prevented by adverse weather. Returning to the mainland, the party paid off their boat and attempted to travel northwards to the most northerly tip of Scotland. In this they were thwarted and had to retrace their route, having met bogs, hazardous rocks and country that even their "shoeless little steeds" had difficulty in negotiating. They returned to Skye for a while before parting company, Pennant continuing his tour while his companions returned to England, Lightfoot carrying with him most of the material he would later use when writing his Flora Scotica. Pennant visited Inverary, Dunkeld, Perth and Montrose. In the latter, he was surprised to learn that sixty or seventy thousand lobsters were caught and sent to London each year. He then travelled via Edinburgh, through Roxburghshire and beside the River Tweed to cross the border at Birgham. Once in England he travelled rapidly home to Downing.

=== Later works ===
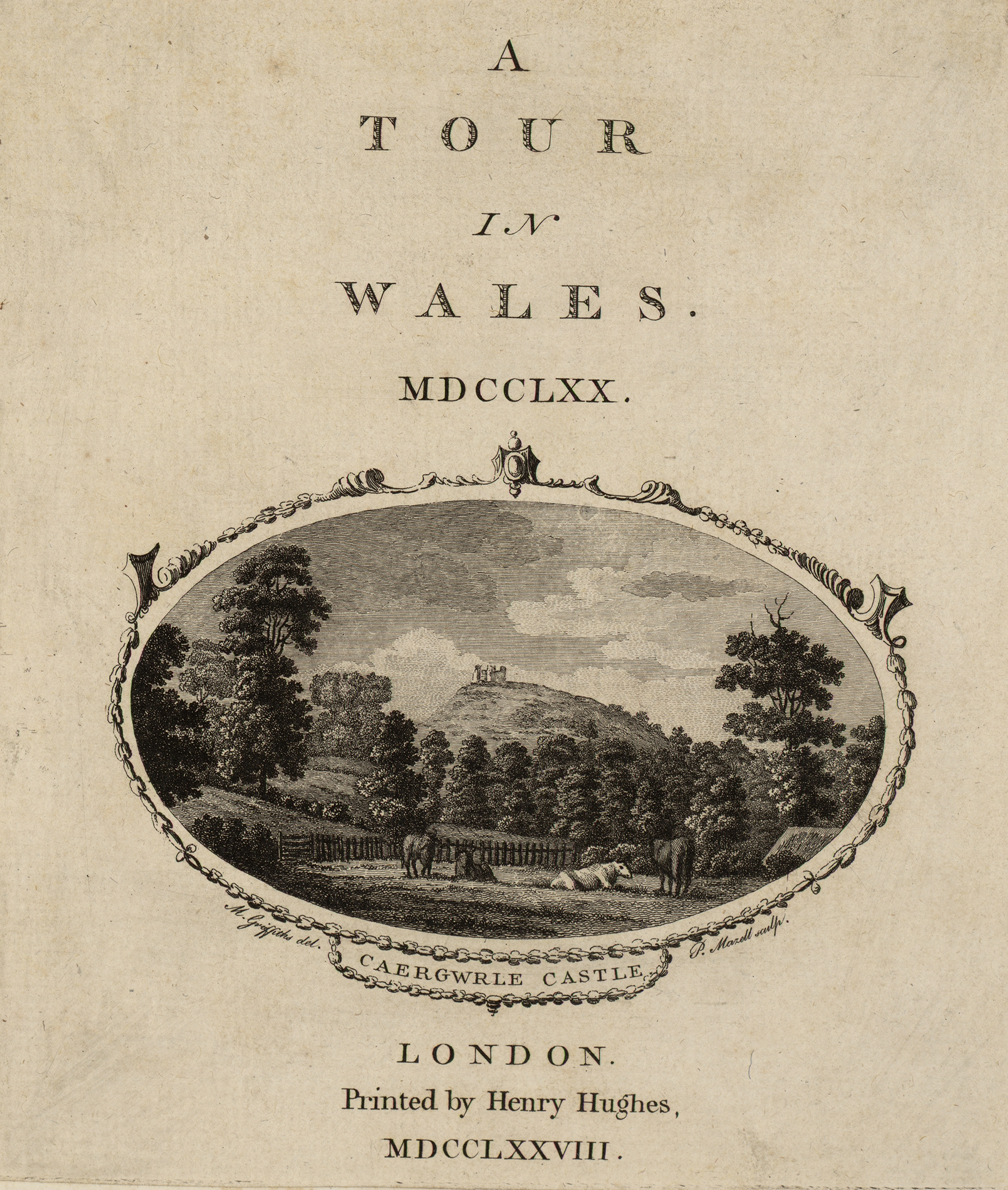
A Tour in Wales, 1770, first published in 1778

Pennant's next publication, in 1774, was his account of the second journey to Scotland. This was in two volumes with the second appearing in 1776. These works include so much detail of the countryside, its economy, natural history and the customs of the inhabitants that they are still of interest today by way of comparison with the very different state of things now. While these volumes were in preparation, he started some new projects. In 1773 he returned to Cumberland, Westmorland and Yorkshire to visit the parts of them that he had missed previously. As with all his tours, he travelled on horseback, keeping his daily journal and accompanied by Moses Griffith who made copious sketches on the way. Pennant seems to have been an unpretentious man of simple tastes, who was welcomed into the homes of strangers wherever he went. He also made tours in Northamptonshire and the Isle of Man. Whenever he travelled to London he took a slightly different route, again recording what he saw and did and on the basis of these details, some years later he wrote his Journey from Chester to London. On one of these journeys, the church he visited at Buckingham in the morning collapsed into ruins that evening.

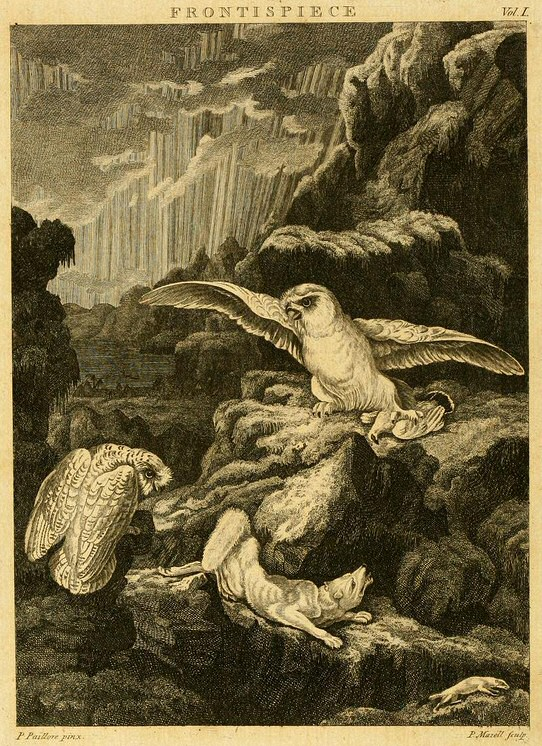
Frontispiece to Arctic Zoology. Painting by Peter Paillou, engraved by Peter Mazell

Over the next few years, Pennant made various excursions in North Wales. As with his other tours, he started from Downing. Almost one hundred pages in the first volume that he subsequently wrote were about the ancient city of Chester. His emphasis in these books was on history and the antiquities he saw, rather than on natural history. He was interested in Owain Glyndŵr and his struggle with Henry IV for supremacy in Wales. The first volume of Tour in Wales was published in 1778 but covered a limited area of the country. In an attempt to remedy this, it was followed by a Journey to Snowdon (part one in 1781 and part two in 1783), and these later jointly became the second volume of his Tour. Although these also concentrated on the history of the places visited, they provided some information on the zoology and botany, in the later case with the assistance of Reverend Lightfoot. Pennant includes tales of the strongwoman and harpist Marged ferch Ifan although he never met her. Pennant mentions tales of the beaver's presence on the River Conwy with a deep stretch being known as "Llyn yr afangc" (Beaver's pool). He also records herons nesting at the top of the cliffs at St Orme's Head above the noisy gulls, razorbills, guillemots and cormorants which had their own nesting zones further down.

Pennant's interests ranged widely. In 1781, he had a paper published in the Philosophical Transactions on the origins of the turkey, arguing that it was a North American bird and not an Old World species. Another paper, published at the instigation of Sir Joseph Banks, was on earthquakes, several of which he had experienced in Flintshire. In the same year he was made an honorary member of the Society of Antiquaries of Scotland and in 1783, he was elected a foreign member of the Royal Swedish Academy of Sciences, and separately, a member of the Swedish Royal Physiographic Society in Lund. In 1791, he was elected a member of the American Philosophical Society.

In 1782, Pennant published his Journey from Chester to London. He had then intended to write a "Zoology of North America" but as he explained in the "Advertisement", since he felt mortified by the loss of British control over America, this was changed to Arctic Zoology. The book was published, with illustrations by Peter Brown, in 1785–1787. The first volume was on quadrupeds and the second on birds. Compilation of the latter was assisted by an expedition Sir Joseph Banks had made to Newfoundland in 1786. The work was translated into German and French, and part of it into Swedish. The volumes were much acclaimed and Pennant was elected a member of the American Philosophical Society. In 1787, a supplementary volume was published which included extra information on the reptiles and fishes of North America.

Pennant is rarely thought of as a poet, but in 1782 he was moved to write an "elegant little poem", Ode to Indifference, as he explains "on account of a Lady speaking in praise of Indifference". In it he "wittily constructs an erotic lyric from the invocation to John Milton's

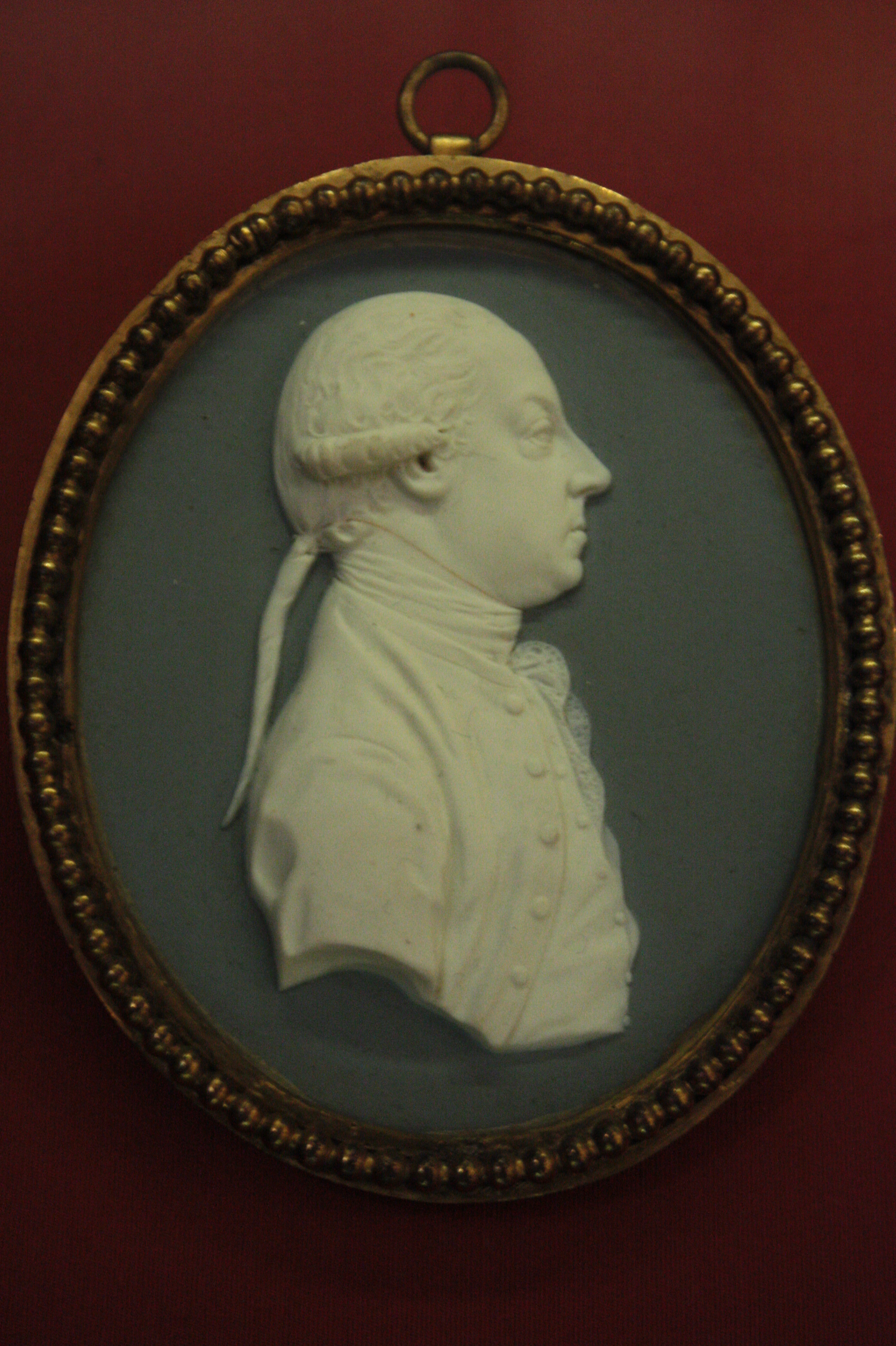
Thomas Pennant, miniature by Josiah Wedgwood

L'Allegro." It includes the lines

Fly, Indifference, hated maid,
Seek Spitsbergen's horrid shade,
...
Teach the sweet coquette to know
Heart of ice in breast of snow;

— Pennant, 1782

In 1790 he published his Account of London, which went through a large number of editions. It was written in the style of his previous works and contained information on things of historical interest in the parts of the capital to which his wanderings led him. By this stage of his life he preferred to make tours in his imagination rather than in reality and he published a second edition of his Indian Zoology. He also conceived the idea of publishing a work on a global scale and set to work on the first two volumes of what was planned to be a fourteen volume series. Each country was to have maps and sketches, colour plates and an account of the country's production with notes on its natural history. All this was to be gleaned from the writing of others who had seen these places themselves. The first two volumes appeared early in 1798 and covered most of India and Ceylon. Volumes three and four included the parts of India east of the Ganges, Malaysia, Japan and China but before these were published he suffered a gradual decline in health and vigour and died at Downing, in December 1798. These two volumes were edited and published posthumously by his son, David, as were also several other short papers and an autobiographical work, The literary life of the late Thomas Pennant, Esq. By himself.

== Correspondents ==
Pennant met and corresponded widely over many years with other naturalists. This gave him privileged access to manuscripts and specimens, and his writings sometimes provide information about otherwise lost discoveries. For example, he visited the botanist Joseph Banks in September 1771 on his return from Captain James Cook's four-year voyage of exploration; Banks appears to have passed his bird specimens on to Pennant. Pennant's manuscripts describe the birds that Banks saw on the voyage; and when he read John Latham's A General Synopsis of Birds (1781–1785), Pennant saw that Latham had omitted some of the land birds from Eastern Australia that Banks had collected, and wrote to Latham to fill in the gaps. The naturalist Peter Simon Pallas asked Banks to inform Pennant of "the unhappy fate of Capt^{n.} Cook", and in December 1779 he wrote to Pennant himself, telling the story.

Letters to Pennant from the parson-naturalist Gilbert White form the first part of White's 1789 book, The Natural History and Antiquities of Selborne. It is almost certain that the men were introduced by Gilbert's brother Benjamin White, Pennant's publisher; Gilbert seized on the opportunity to correspond, as a way of overcoming the intellectual isolation of Selborne in the absence of suitable learned societies at which he could read papers and share ideas. He knew that Pennant, with little skill or inclination as a field naturalist, was gathering observations to publish in his books; he quickly determined that he would make his own use of the correspondence, and kept copies of every letter he sent to Pennant. White was more careful than Pennant, and was sometimes critical; for example, in 1769 he objected that the goatsucker did not only make its sound while flying as Pennant asserted, so it was wrong to suppose that the noise must be made by the air beating against its "vastly extended mouth". Pennant accepted White's criticisms graciously. Unfortunately Pennant's letters to White have been lost: White's Natural History begins with 44 of White's letters to Pennant, of which the first nine were never posted; the remaining 35 letters are dated between 4 August 1767 and 30 November 1780, covering topics as varied as whether swallows hibernate or migrate (letter 10), ring ousels (letter 20), whether peacock trains are really tails (letter 35), and thunderstorms (letter 44).

== Works by Pennant ==
WorldCat listing:-

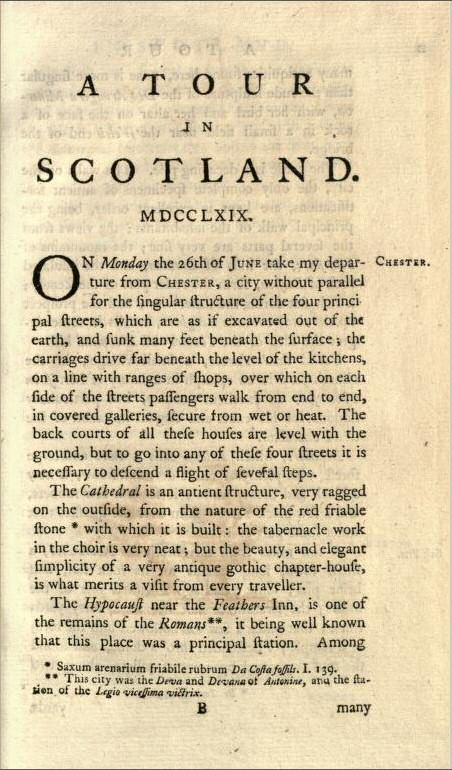
First page of A Tour in Scotland 1769, published in 1771.

- The British Zoology, Class 1, Quadrupeds. 2, Birds. J. and J. March, 1766.
- A Tour in Scotland 1769. John Monk, 1771.
- A Synopsis of Quadrupeds. John Monk, 1771.
- A Tour in Scotland, and Voyage to the Hebrides 1772. John Monk, 1774.
- Genera of Birds. Balfour and Smellie, 1773.
- British Zoology. Benjamin White, 1776–1777.
- A Tour in Wales. H.D. Symonds, 1778 & 1781.
- A History of Quadrupeds. John Monk, 1781.
- Free Thoughts on the Militia Laws. Benjamin White, 1781.
- The Journey to Snowdon. Henry Hughs, 1781.
- The Journey from Chester to London. Benjamin White, 1782.
- Arctic Zoology. Henry Hughs, 1784–1787.
- Of the Patagonians. George Allan (private press), 1788.
- Of London. Robert Faulder, 1790.
- Indian Zoology. Robert Faulder, 1790.
- A Letter to a Member of Parliament: On Mail-Coaches. R. Faulder, 1792.
- The Literary Life of the Late Thomas Pennant. Benjamin and J. White, 1793. (Note: Pennant writes "The title-page announces the termination of my authorial existence, which took place on March 1st, 1791".)
- The History of the Parishes of Whiteford and Holywell. Benjamin and J. White, 1796.
- The View of Hindoostan. Henry Hughs, 1798–1800.
- Western Hindoostan. Henry Hughs, 1798.
- The View of India extra Gangem, China, and Japan. L. Hansard, 1800.
- The View of the Malayan Isles, New Holland, and the Spicy Isles. John White, 1800.
- A Journey from London to the Isle of Wight. E. Harding, 1801.
- From Dover to the Isle of Wight. Wilson, 1801.
- A Tour from Downing to Alston-Moor. E. Harding, 1801.
- A Tour from Alston-Moor to Harrowgate, and Brimham Crags. J. Scott, 1804.

== Reception ==
Pennant's two Scottish tours were praised by critics, as were his natural history books. The Critical Review called the Tour in Scotland 1769 "the best itinerary which has hitherto been written on that country". Pennant's two Scottish tours made him the best known writer on Scotland, and stimulated the great literary figure of the age, Dr Johnson, to travel in Scotland and especially to the Hebrides, resulting in notable works by both Johnson (A Journey to the Western Islands of Scotland, 1775) and his friend and biographer James Boswell (The Journal of a Tour to the Hebrides, 1786), According to the historian David Allan, all three of these "famous" texts were "deliberate attempts... to educate their English readers about Scotland. The intention here was usually to instil both a genuine curiosity and a profound sympathy for their fellow Britons" in marked contrast, in Allan's view, to the prevailing English ignorance and hostility to the people of Scotland; and he cites evidence that readers found it "a beguiling vision that literally prescribed how they would now see and respond—positively, fondly, inquisitively—to Scotland and its culture". With rare praise, Johnson said of Pennant "... he's the best traveller I ever read; he observes more things than anyone else does." And in 1777, Johnson said to Boswell "Our ramble in the islands hangs upon my imagination. I can hardly help imagining that we shall go again. Pennant seems to have seen a great deal which we did not see. When we travel again let us look better about us."

The Gentleman's Magazine of 1797 reviewed The History of the Parishes of Whiteford and Holywell, commenting on his claim ("Resurgam", Latin for 'I shall rise') to have returned from the dead (having announced the end of his literary life back in 1791), and continuing to joke about his excesses throughout. For example, the review remarks that the portrait of "the late Pretender" to the throne "at a certain time, might have cost its possessor [Pennant] his seat on the bench of justices".

== Legacy ==
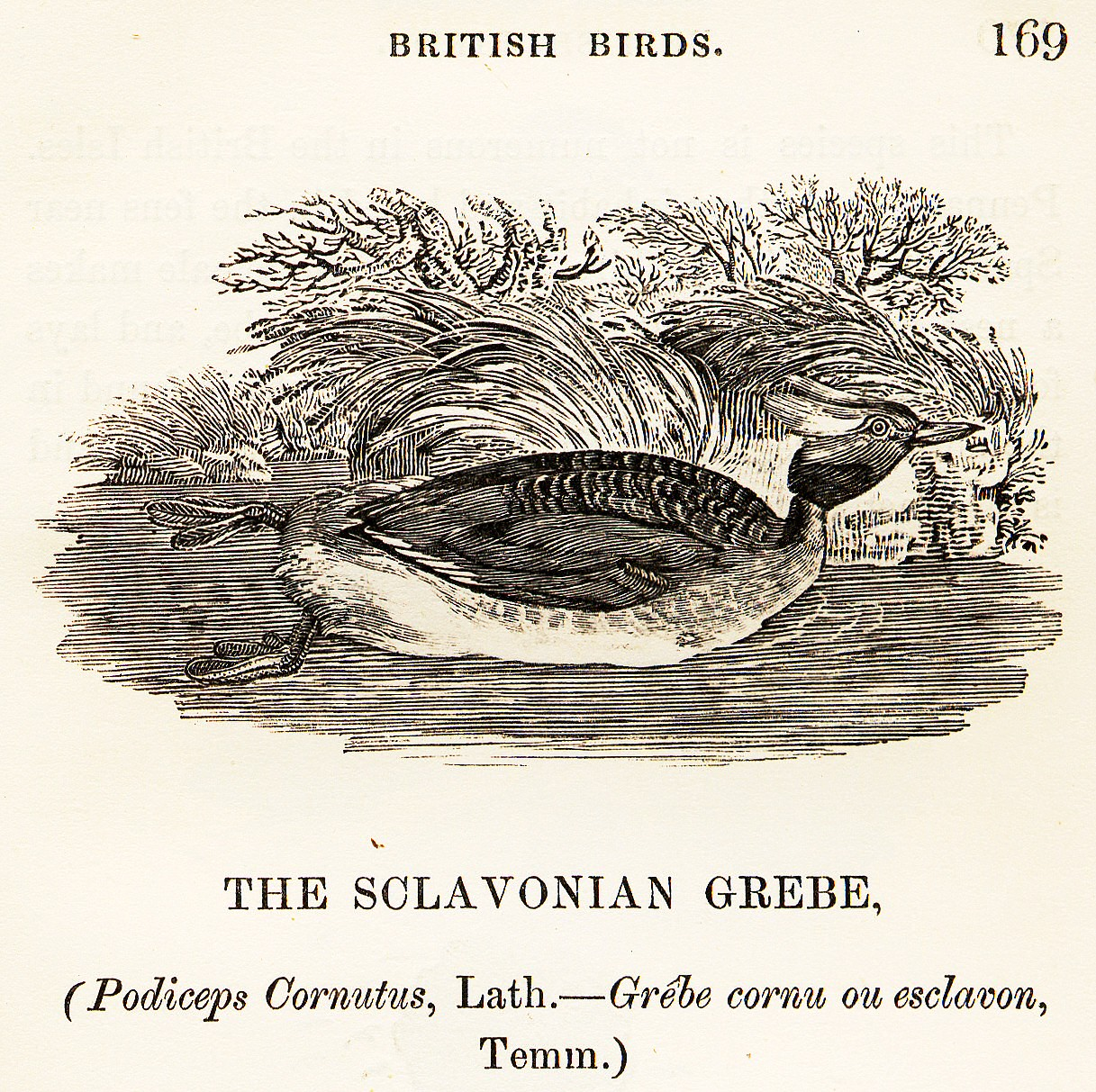
"The Sclavonian Grebe" in Thomas Bewick's A History of British Birds, Volume 2, Water Birds. 1847 edition.

After Pennant's death, the French zoologist and naturalist Georges Cuvier wrote of him "When the life of a man is entirely devoted to the sciences, it cannot be expected that it will present a variety of incident; it will be found most truly in the analysis of his works." Pennant is cited as an authority by Thomas Bewick throughout his pioneering field guide, A History of British Birds (2 volumes, 1797 and 1804). For example, under "The Golden Eagle", Bewick writes that "Pennant says there are instances, though rare, of their having bred in Snowdon Hills". Bewick cites him for facts about rare species like "The Sclavonian Grebe": "This species is not numerous in the British Isles. Pennant says, they inhabit and breed in the fens near Spalding, in Lincolnshire, and that the female makes a nest not unlike that of the Crested Grebe, and lays four or five white eggs." On occasion, Pennant's knowledge could be highly specific: for "The Great-Crested Grebe", Bewick records that the nest "is made of various kinds of dried fibres, stalks and leaves of water plants, and (Pennant says) of the roots of bugbane, stalks of water-lily, pond-weed and water-violet; when it happens to be blown from among the reeds, it floats about upon the surface of the water".

The naturalist Richard Mabey wrote that Pennant was "a doughty and open-minded traveller, and his various Tours were best-sellers in their time", adding Samuel Johnson's comment that Pennant was "the best traveller I ever read". Mabey however comments that he "had no great aptitude or instinct for field-work and nothing approaching [Gilbert] White's critical intelligence", arguing that Pennant "was essentially an intellectual entrepreneur, a popularizer and compiler of other people's observations and ideas, and was able to produce a large number of very readable guides as a result." Mabey adds that Pennant had a "pushy and bombastic manner, and a reliance on second-hand information that at times came close to plagiarism" but admits that he was an innovative author of books, in particular by seeking original reports "from a wide network of field observers", meeting the fashion in the 1760s for natural history journalism.

Pennant's exploration of the Western Isles of Scotland was revisited by Nicholas Crane in a television documentary programme first broadcast on BBC Two on 16 August 2007, as part of the "Great British Journeys" series. Pennant was the subject of the first in the eight part series.

Cymdeithas Thomas Pennant (Thomas Pennant Society) was formed in 1989, aiming to foster Pennant's memory. It arranges a programme of events connected with him including publishing leaflets and booklets, holding lectures, an annual dinner and arranging walks in "Pennant Country". In 2013, the society proposed to Flintshire County Council that "Holywell and the north Flintshire area" be designated 'Pennant Country'. Some Holywell town councillors voiced reservations.

In 2025, the Gilbert White House Museum in Selborne held an exhibition Curious Minds about Pennant and White's work, to celebrate the museum's 70th anniversary.

== Species named after him ==
The following marine species were named with the epithets pennanti, pennantii and pennantiana:

- Anchomasa pennantiana Leach in Gray, 1852: synonym of Barnea parva (Pennant, 1777)
- Arca pennantiana Leach in Gray, 1852: synonym of Striarca lactea (Linnaeus, 1758)
- Argentina pennanti Walbaum, 1792: synonym of Maurolicus muelleri (Gmelin, 1789)
- Blennius pennantii Yarrell, 1835: synonym of Chirolophis ascanii (Walbaum, 1792)
- Cardium pennanti Reeve, 1844: synonym of Laevicardium crassum (Gmelin, 1791)
- Cardium pennantii Reeve, 1844: synonym of Laevicardium crassum (Gmelin, 1791)
- Coregonus pennantii
- Ebalia pennantii Leach, 1817: synonym of Ebalia tuberosa (Pennant, 1777)
- Funambulus pennantii
- Gibbula pennanti (Philippi, 1846)
- Lamna pennanti (Walbaum, 1792): synonym of Lamna nasus (Bonnaterre, 1788)
- Maurolicus pennanti (Walbaum, 1792): synonym of Maurolicus muelleri (Gmelin, 1789)
- Ovula pennantiana Leach, 1847: synonym of Simnia patula (Pennant, 1777)
- Pasiphaë pennantia Leach in Gray, 1852: synonym of Timoclea ovata (Pennant, 1777)
- Pekania pennanti (1771) common name: fisher
- Procolobus pennantii Waterhouse, 1838
- Selachus pennantii Cornish, 1885: synonym of Cetorhinus maximus (Gunnerus, 1765)
- Squalus pennanti Walbaum, 1792: synonym of Lamna nasus (Bonnaterre, 1788)
- Tetrodon pennantii Yarrell, 1836: synonym of Lagocephalus lagocephalus lagocephalus (Linnaeus, 1758)
- Trochus pennanti Philippi, 1846: synonym of Gibbula pennanti (Philippi, 1846)
- Venus pennanti Forbes, 1838: synonym of Chamelea striatula (da Costa, 1778)
- Venus pennantii Forbes, 1838: synonym of Chamelea striatula (da Costa, 1778)
- Vermilia pennantii Quatrefages, 1866: synonym of Pomatoceros triqueter (Linnaeus, 1758): synonym of Spirobranchus triqueter (Linnaeus, 1758)

== See also ==
- Category:Taxa named by Thomas Pennant
