= A Journey to the Western Islands of Scotland =

1775 travel narrative by Samuel Johnson

- Author: Samuel Johnson
- Language: English
- Publication date: 1775

A Journey to the Western Islands of Scotland (1775) is a travel narrative by Samuel Johnson about an eighty-three-day journey through Scotland, in particular the islands of the Hebrides, in the late summer and autumn of 1773. The sixty-three-year-old Johnson was accompanied by his thirty-two-year-old friend of many years James Boswell, who was also keeping a record of the trip, published in 1785 as A Journal of a Tour to the Hebrides. The two narratives are often published as a single volume, which is beneficial for comparing two perspectives of the same events, although they are very different in approach---Johnson focused on Scotland, and Boswell focused on Johnson. (Boswell went on to write a famous biography of Johnson.) In that biography, Boswell gave the itinerary of the trip as beginning at Edinburgh after landing at Berwick upon Tweed, then to St Andrews, Aberdeen, Inverness, and Fort Augustus. From there they went on to the islands of the Hebrides: Skye, Raasay, Coll, Mull, Inch Kenneth, and Iona. Returning to the mainland in Argyll they visited Inverary, Loch Lomond, Dumbarton, Glasgow, Loudoun, Auchinleck in Ayrshire (Boswell's family home), and Hamilton, and then finished the journey by returning to Edinburgh. Boswell summarised the trip as, "[Johnson] thus saw the four Universities of Scotland, its three principal cities, and as much of the Highland and insular life as was sufficient for his philosophical contemplation."

== Scotland ==
Highland Scotland was still a relatively wild place in 1773. Marauding privateers and slave-ships worked the coasts (seven slavers were reported in 1774 alone). The destruction of Scottish forests was in full swing. The Scottish clan system had been dismantled by Act of Parliament, the population had been disarmed and wearing of the tartan was prohibited. Scotch whisky was distilled illegally and profusely (Johnson noted the custom of the skalk, or drinking whisky before breakfast). The rule of law was by no means properly established, and the power of the clan chieftains, though curtailed, was often the only real authority.

Johnson and Boswell toured the Highlands and islands by carriage, on horseback and by boat, planning the stages of their journey to stay at the houses of the local gentry. They were astounded when they visited their colleague Lord Monboddo at Monboddo House and saw him in his primitive attire as a farmer, a quite different picture from his image as an urbane Edinburgh Court of Session jurist, philosopher and proto-evolutionary thinker.

This part of Scotland in 1773 was, according to Johnson, a romantic place. It was relatively empty of people and nearly unspoiled by commerce, roads, and other trappings of modern life – Johnson noted that in some Highland islands money had not yet become custom. Indeed, with no money or roads parts of Scotland were more akin to the 8th century than 18th. Once Johnson reached the West Highlands, there were few roads, none at all on the Isle of Skye, and so they traveled by horseback, usually along the ridge of a hill with a local guide who knew the terrain and the best route for the season. "Journies made in this manner are rather tedious and long. A very few miles requires several hours", Johnson wrote. He deplored the depopulation of the Highlands: "Some method to stop this epidemic desire of wandering, which spreads its contagion from valley to valley, ought to be sought with great diligence".

Although Johnson admitted he understood nothing about Scottish Gaelic, he reported what he had been told about it: "Of the Earse language, as I understand nothing, I cannot say more than I have been told. It is the rude speech of a barbarous people, who had few thoughts to express, and were content, as they conceived grossly, to be grossly understood". He thus popularized the misconception that the Gaels had no written literature going as far as reporting "that the Earse never was a written language; that there is not in the world an Earse manuscript a hundred years old; and that the sounds of the highlanders were never expressed by letters, till some little books of piety were translated, and a metrical version of the Psalms was made by the Synod of Argyle."

Johnson came to Scotland to see the primitive and wild, but Scotland by 1773 was already changing quickly, and he feared they had come "too late". But they did see some of the things they sought out, such as one gentleman wearing the traditional plaid kilt, and bagpipe playing – but none of the martial spirit Scotland was so famous for, except in relics and stories. Johnson records and comments on many things about Scottish life, including the happiness and health of the people, antiquities, the economy, orchards and trees, whisky, dress, architecture, religion, language, and education.

Johnson had spent most of his life in London, and only travelled for the first time in 1771.

In England there was much interest in Scotland, and Johnson's book was not the first to report on it. Notably Thomas Pennant's A Tour in Scotland in 1769 was published in 1771, a far more detailed and lengthy account than Johnson's. Pennant set a new standard in travel literature: Johnson said of him "he's the best traveller I ever read; he observes more things than anyone else does".

== Sources ==
There are many editions available in print, out of print, online, in hardcover and paperback. Listed here are some notable unusual editions of interest.

- Pat Rogers, ed. (1993). Johnson and Boswell in Scotland. Yale University Press. The two accounts are presented side-by-side, page-by-page. ISBN 978-0-300-05210-7
- A Journey to the Western Islands of Scotland, scanned page images, online first edition.
- A Journey to the Western Islands of Scotland, scanned book, 1791 edition. Internet Archive
- A Journey to the Western Islands of Scotland at Project Gutenberg. Plain text and HTML versions.
- Donald MacNicol. Remarks on Dr. Samuel Johnson's Journey to the Hebrides; in which are contained observations on the antiquities, language, genius, and manners of the Highlanders of Scotland. London: Printed for T. Cadell, 1779. From Internet Archive.

== See also ==
- Recollections of a Tour Made in Scotland, A. D. 1803
