= Skalk =

Scottish Hebridean whisky drinking tradition

The skalk refers to the Scottish Hebridean tradition of drinking a dram of whisky as an aperitif before breakfast. The word is an anglicization of the Scots Gaelic word sgailc meaning literally "a blow, knock, or skelp." The tradition was notably observed by the English writer Samuel Johnson during his tour of the Western Isles of Scotland. In his A Journey to the Western Islands of Scotland, Johnson remarks that "A man of the Hebrides, for of the woman's diet I can give no account, as soon as he appears in the morning, swallows a glass of whisky; yet they are not a drunken race, at least I never was present at much intemperance; but no man is so abstemious as to refuse the morning dram, which they call a skalk." In modern usage, the term skalk is used in Scotch whisky drinking culture to refer to a casual glass of whisky in the morning.
