= Peter Mazell =

Irish painter and engraver

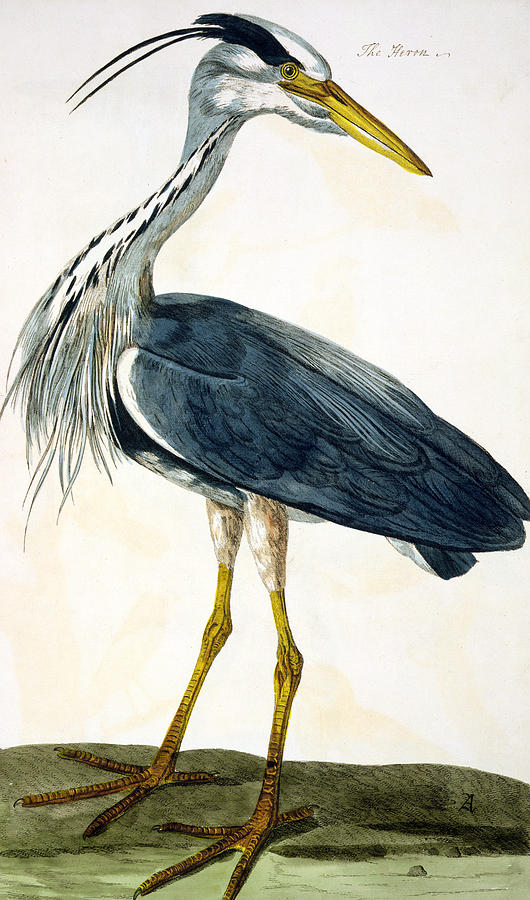
"The Heron" engraved by Peter Mazell from painting by Peter Paillou. In The British Zoology, Class II: Birds (1761–1766) by Thomas Pennant.

Peter Mazell was an Irish painter and engraver, working in London between c. 1761 and 1797. He is known for his fine engravings of natural history subjects, especially those illustrating books by John Walcott and the Welsh naturalist Thomas Pennant. He created almost 600 engravings in his career. He also exhibited paintings of landscapes and flowers. He exhibited at the Society of Artists and at the Royal Academy.

== Life and work ==
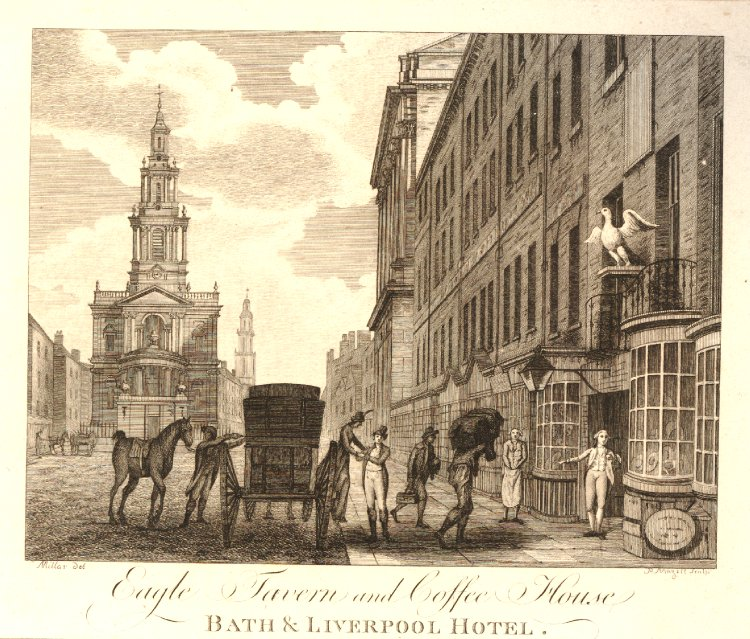
Print of engraving Eagle Tavern and Coffee House in The Strand, London by Peter Mazell after? William Miller, c 1780.

Mazell is believed to have been the son of Pierre Mazell (d. 2 March 1787) and Catherine Rocque (d. 7 September 1788), Huguenots living in Dublin, Ireland. He lived in central London, with addresses in Tottenham Court Road (1769), Paddington (1770–80), Portland Street (1783), Gerrard Street (1790), Covent Garden (1791) and St. Pancras (1797).

In 1761 he exhibited a landscape painting at the Society of Artists in London, and worked in London for the rest of his career. Most of his subsequent exhibits between then and 1791 were prints of his engravings on copperplate; these included views of country scenery such as The Upper Lake of Killarney, 1770 as well as numerous views of London and other cities. His landscape and natural history engravings are considered extremely crisp and neat. However, not everybody liked his work; the Dutch provincial governor Joan Gideon Loten complained of the "bungling engraver Mazell" for his work on two engravings of what was then called the "Ceylon Tailorbird", and referring to the plate of another bird, the red-faced malkoha, "made so dirty by the pityable engraver Mazell".

Mazell often worked on natural history illustrations for books by Thomas Pennant, using paintings of birds by Peter Paillou in The British Zoology (1766), History of Quadrupeds (1781) and Arctic Zoology (1784–1785).

He also illustrated some of Pennant's travel books including Tour of Wales, 1778. As well as works by Pennant, Mazell illustrated books by John Boydell in 1763; Charles Cordiner's Remarkable Ruins and Romantic Prospects of North Britain in 1792; and Captain James Cook's Voyages. At least occasionally, he continued to paint as well as to make engravings: he exhibited two flower paintings at the 1797 exhibition of the Royal Academy of Arts.

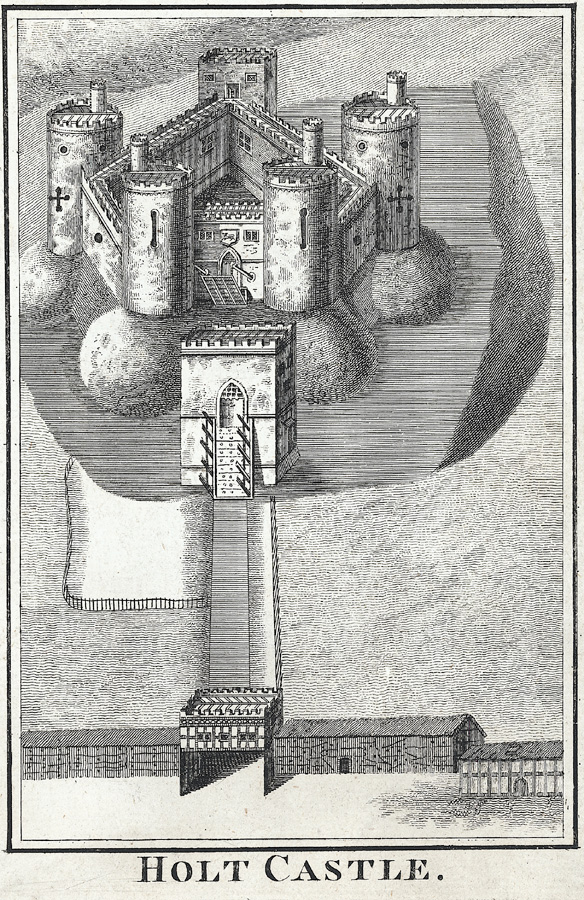
Holt Castle, 1779

Mazell's engravings are of paintings by many artists including Charles Cordiner; Moses Griffiths; John Webber; Rowland Omer; Philip Thicknesse; the natural history artist Desmoulins; Samuel Rawle; Richard Holland; William Miller; Jonathan Fisher; Thomas Snagg; James "Athenian" Stuart; Christian Georg Schütz; Paul Sandby; John Watts; the equestrian painter George Stubbs.

== Awards and achievements ==
Mazell became a Fellow of the Society of Artists in 1772, and Vice-President of the same Society in 1790.

== Works in national collections ==
- National Portrait Gallery
- British Museum (70 prints)
- National Trust
- Victoria and Albert Museum
- National Maritime Museum, Greenwich
- National Gallery of Australia (35 prints)
