= Peter Paillou =

English painter

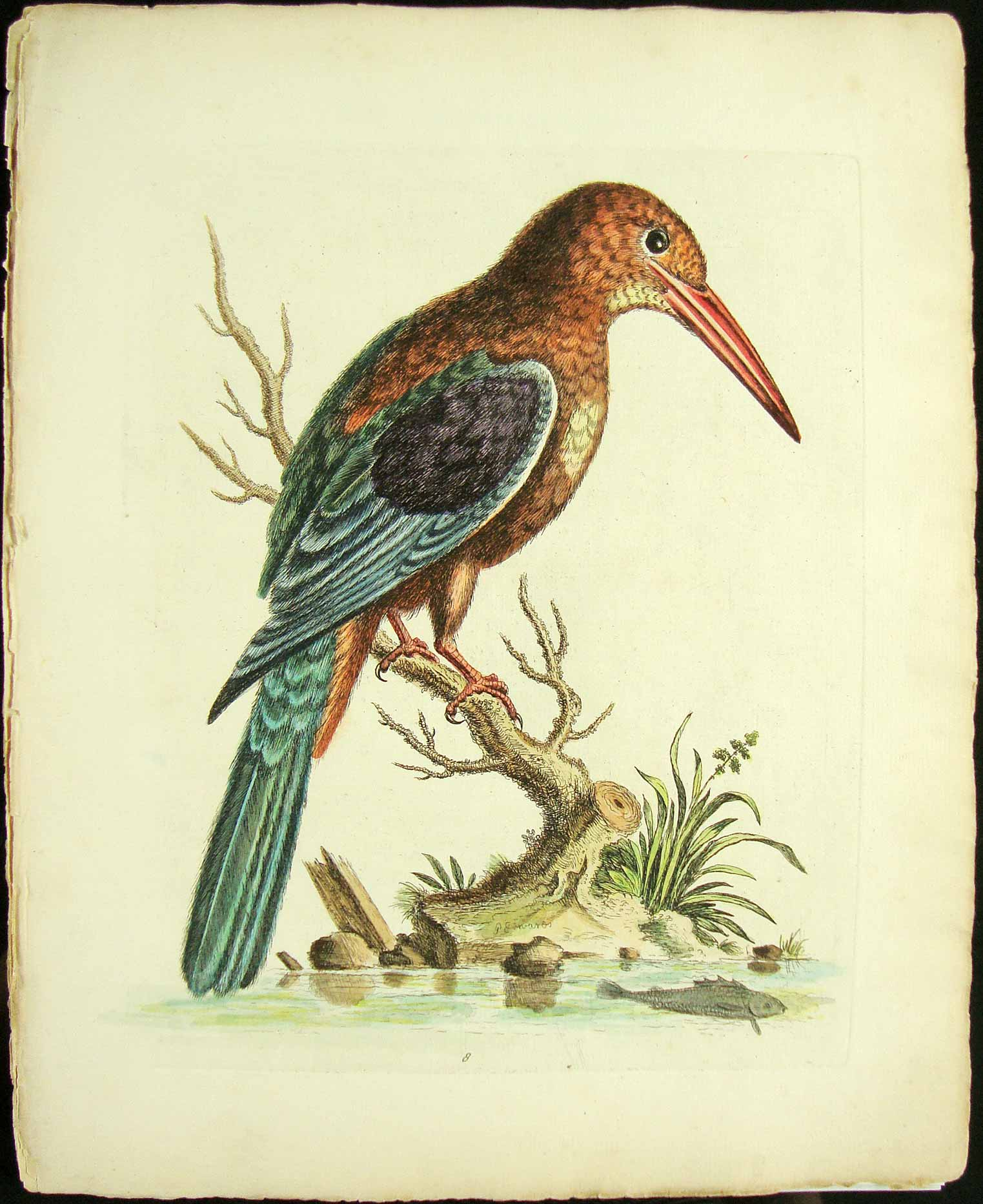
Painting of "Great Kingfisher" by Peter Paillou. Colour plate in A natural history of birds by George Edwards, 1740–50

Peter Paillou (c.1720 – c.1790) was a British artist best known for his paintings of birds, many of which were used as book illustrations.

== Life and career ==
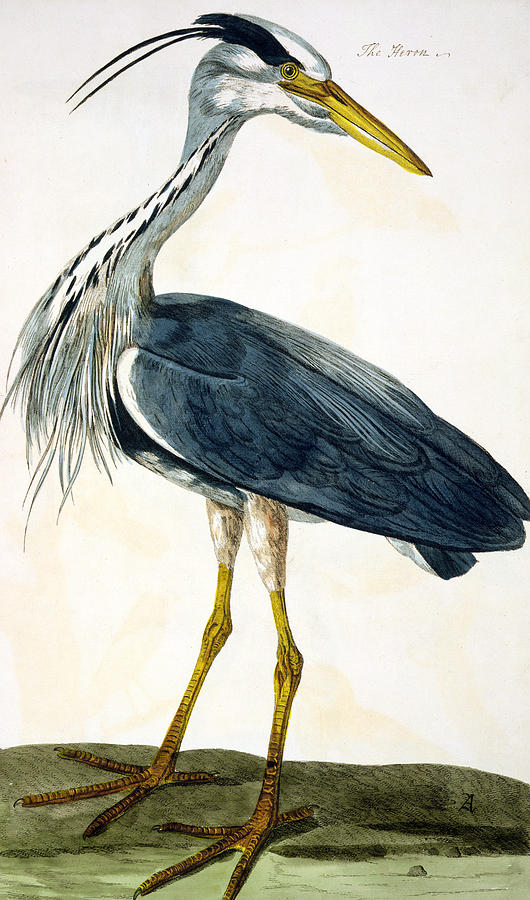
"The Heron" engraved by Peter Mazell in 1766 from painting by Peter Paillou. In The British Zoology, Class II: Birds.

Little is known of his early life but it is believed that he came to Britain from France in the early part of the eighteenth century.

He was given a commission to paint a gilded pheasant in 1745. He was employed by Thomas Pennant to paint pictures of birds, many of which were engraved by Peter Mazell for use as plates in Pennant's books.

He made a number of paintings representing different climate types for Thomas Pennant, probably under commission, and some of these are in the Pennant Collection in the National Library of Wales.

== Family ==
His son, also named Peter Paillou (1757–1831), was a painter of portraits including miniatures. He practised in London for 20 years before moving to Glasgow for some years, where he charged eight guineas for a miniature and ten guineas for a three quarter length portrait in oils.

== Works ==
- Colour plates in A natural history of birds by George Edwards, 1740–50.
