= Downing Hall =

Former country house in Wales

Coordinates: 53°17′52″N 3°16′11″W

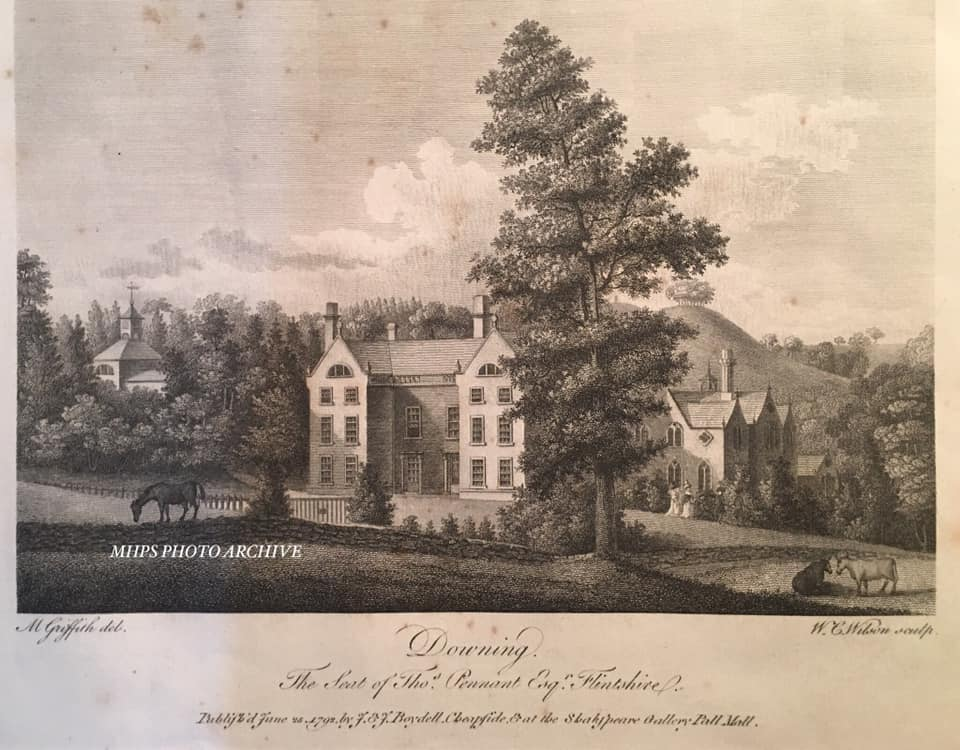
Downing Hall, 1792, by artist Moses Griffith

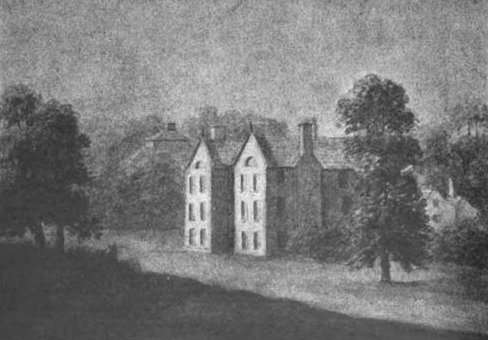
Downing Hall in a 1785 sketch by T. Lynes.

Downing Hall was built in 1627 by the Pennant family near Whitford, Flintshire. It was later the home of Thomas Pennant, the naturalist, traveller and writer. It was partially destroyed in a fire in the early 20th century and afterwards left derelict until it was demolished in 1953.

== Early history ==
Downing Hall was built by the Pennant family in 1627, their principal seat being a mansion Bychton Hall at Mostyn, Flintshire, built before 1572. The front of Downing Hall was set back with wings projecting forward on either side. On the south east side there was a prominent bay window with the family coat of arms above. On the front of the house was the Welsh motto Heb Dduw, heb ddim, a Duw a digon (without God, without anything; God and enough). When Thomas Pennant inherited the estate, he described the house as being "incapable of being improved into a magnitude exceeding the revenue of the family." It pleased him because it was "a small house with a large garden." Nevertheless, the house had some handsome rooms including a large hall, a parlour "capable of containing more guests than I ever wish to see in it at a time," a library 30 feet (9.1 m) by 18 feet (5.5 m) well stocked with classical, historical and natural history books and a smoking-room "most antiquely furnished with ancient carvings, and the horns of all the European beasts of chase".

== 18th and 19th centuries ==
Thomas Pennant inherited the house on the death of his father, David, in 1763. He refurbished the house, erected a new stable block and was probably responsible for creating the walled kitchen garden. He found the pleasure grounds badly neglected with the surrounding woods encroaching on the gardens and threw himself enthusiastically into improving them. He was helped in this by the discovery of a seam of lead on the estate which, when mined, brought in a useful income. He "laid open the natural beauties of the place", improved the scenery, created walkways, vistas and dingles and built a sunken passageway under the turnpike road. His son, David, who inherited the house in 1793, was also a keen gardener. He added the library wing and was responsible for the erection of productive glasshouses with vineries, a peach house, cucumber house and heated beds.

David's granddaughter Louisa was the last of the line of this branch of the Pennant family. She married Rudolph, Viscount Feilding, later to become the 8th Earl of Denbigh. Louisa died without issue in 1853 and Lord Feilding inherited the house. He employed the architect T. H. Wyatt to enlarge it and was also responsible for the rebuilding of the lean-to glasshouses. He did not live there most of the time, making his Warwickshire house, Newnham Paddox, his main residence. Downing Hall was then let to various tenants as a sporting retreat.

== 20th century ==
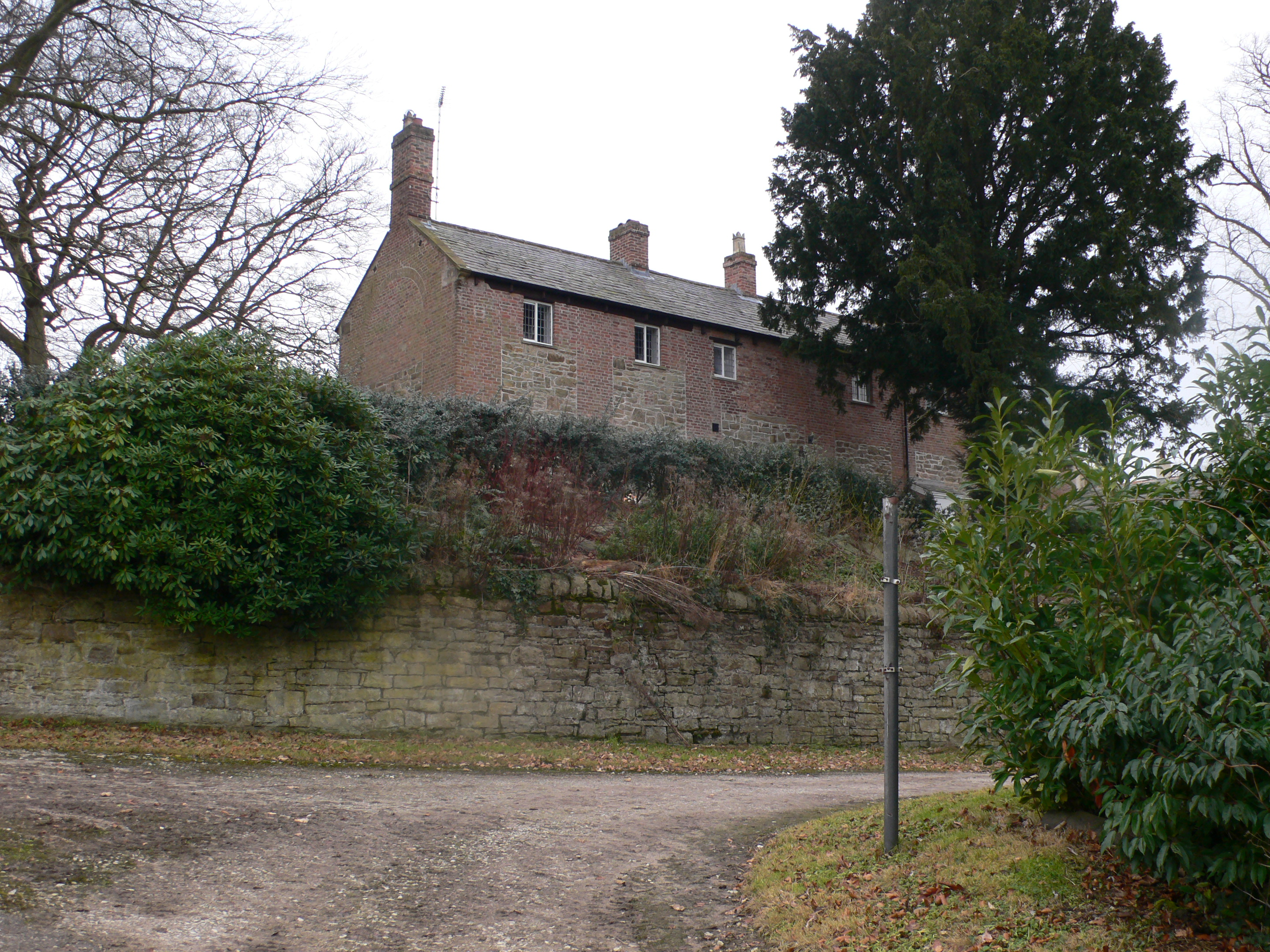
Former coach house

In 1920 the house was put up for sale and in 1922 there was a fire which seriously damaged the structure. It was never rebuilt and was demolished in 1953. Immediately before demolition, several photographs were taken on behalf of "Gathering the Jewels", a society devoted to commemorating the culture and heritage of Wales.

In 2007, the only buildings remaining included the glasshouses, the coach house, the stables, the potting sheds, the upper and lower lodges, the clock tower and the gardener's cottage.
