= Moses Griffith (physician) =

English physician

Moses Griffith (1724–1785) was an English physician.

Griffith, son of Edward Griffith, was born at Lapidon, Shropshire, in 1724, and educated at Shrewsbury School. He entered at St. John's College, Cambridge, in 1742, and afterwards studied medicine at Leyden, where he graduated M.D. in 1744. He practised for many years in London, but in 1768 retired to Colchester, where he died in March 1785. He wrote Practical Observations on the Cure of the Hectic and Slow Fevers, and the Pulmonary Consumption, 1776. Griffith is credited with the invention of the useful compound iron mixture of the Pharmacopoeia.
