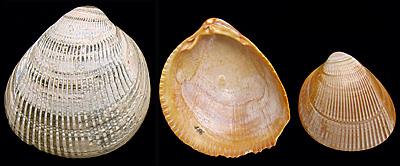
- Valves of Laevicardium crassum
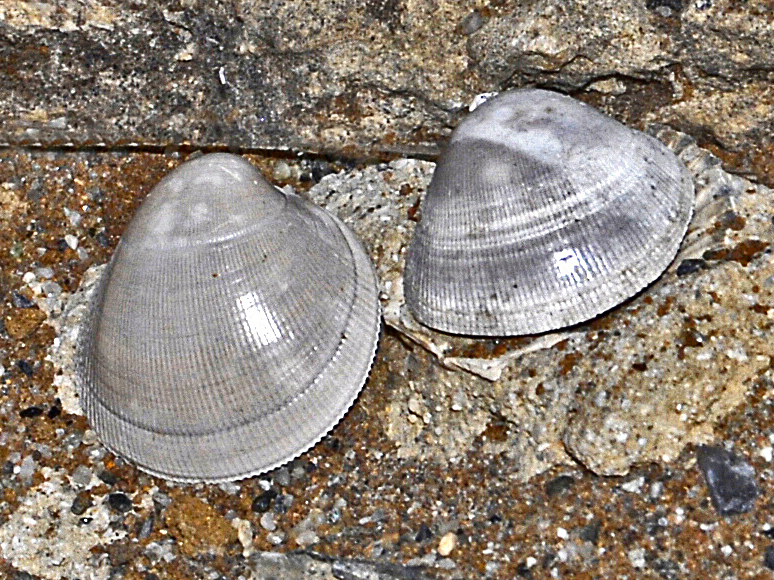
- Fossils of L. crassum from Pliocene of Italy

Scientific classification
- Kingdom: Animalia
- Phylum: Mollusca
- Class: Bivalvia
- Order: Cardiida
- Family: Cardiidae
- Genus: Laevicardium
- Species: L. crassum

Binomial name
- Laevicardium crassum Gmelin, 1791

= Laevicardium crassum =

Laevicardium crassum Temporal range: Quaternary – Present

Species of bivalve

Laevicardium crassum, the Norwegian egg cockle, is a species of saltwater clam, a cockle, a marine bivalve mollusc in the family Cardiidae, the cockles.

== Fossil record ==
Fossils of Laevicardium crassum are found in marine strata of the Quaternary (age range: from 0.126 to 0.012 million years ago.). Fossils are known from various localities in Ireland, Italy, Netherlands and Portugal.

== Description ==
Shell of Laevicardium crassum can reach a length of about 7.5 centimetres (3.0 in). The shell exterior is white or light yellow with occasional dark markings. The shell surface is smooth and shows 40-50 ribs with a crenulated margin.

Laevicardium crassum

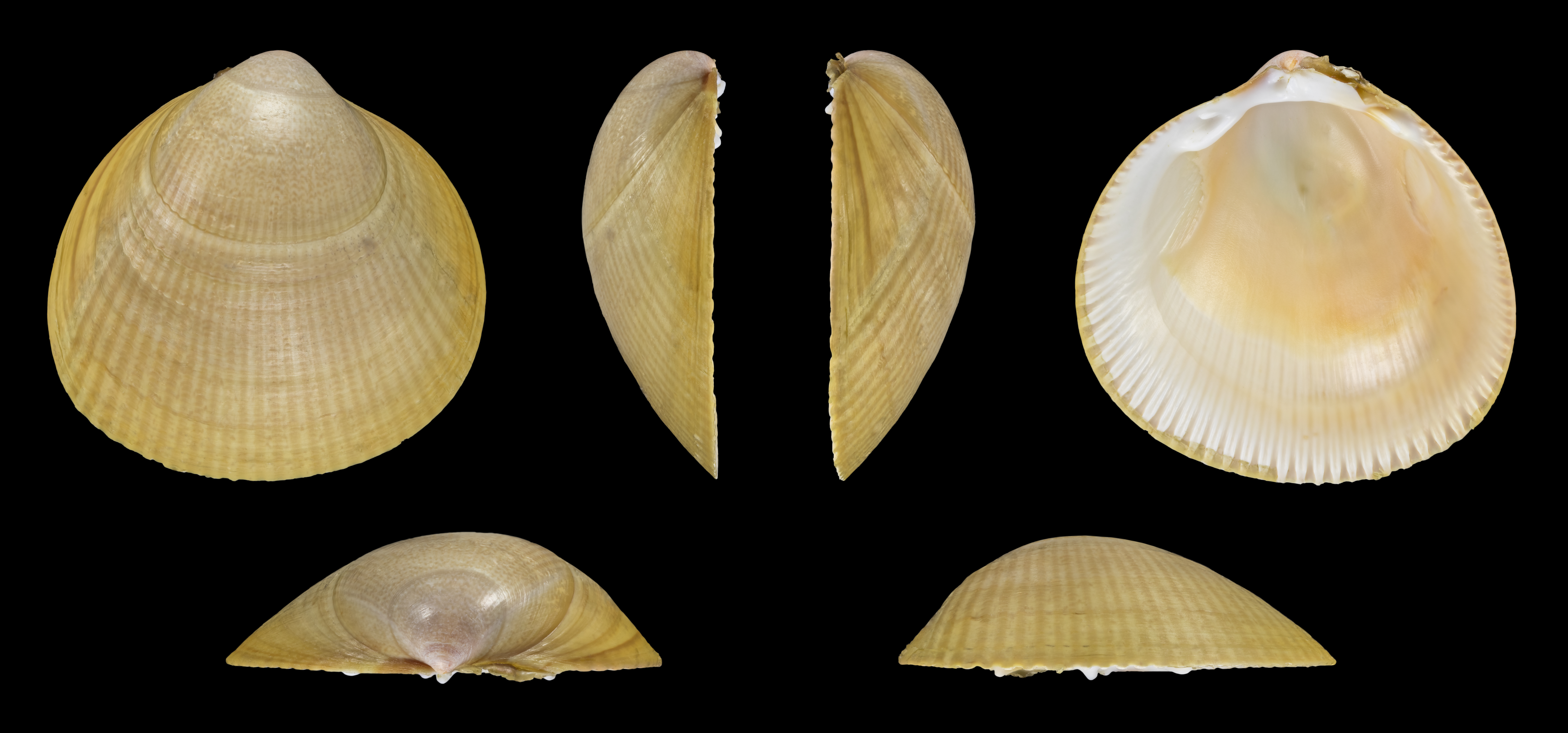
Right valve

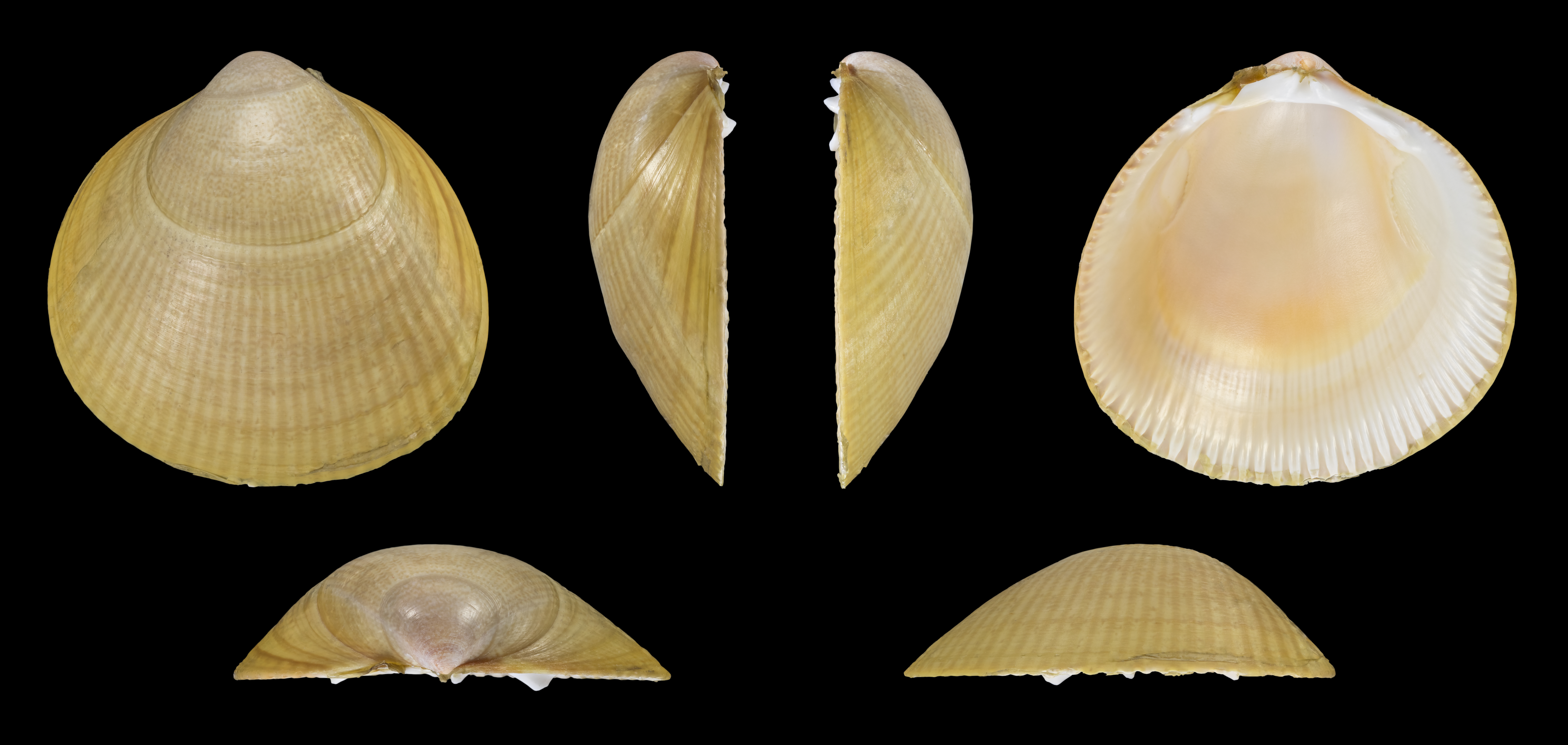
Left valve

Laevicardium crassum mediterraneum

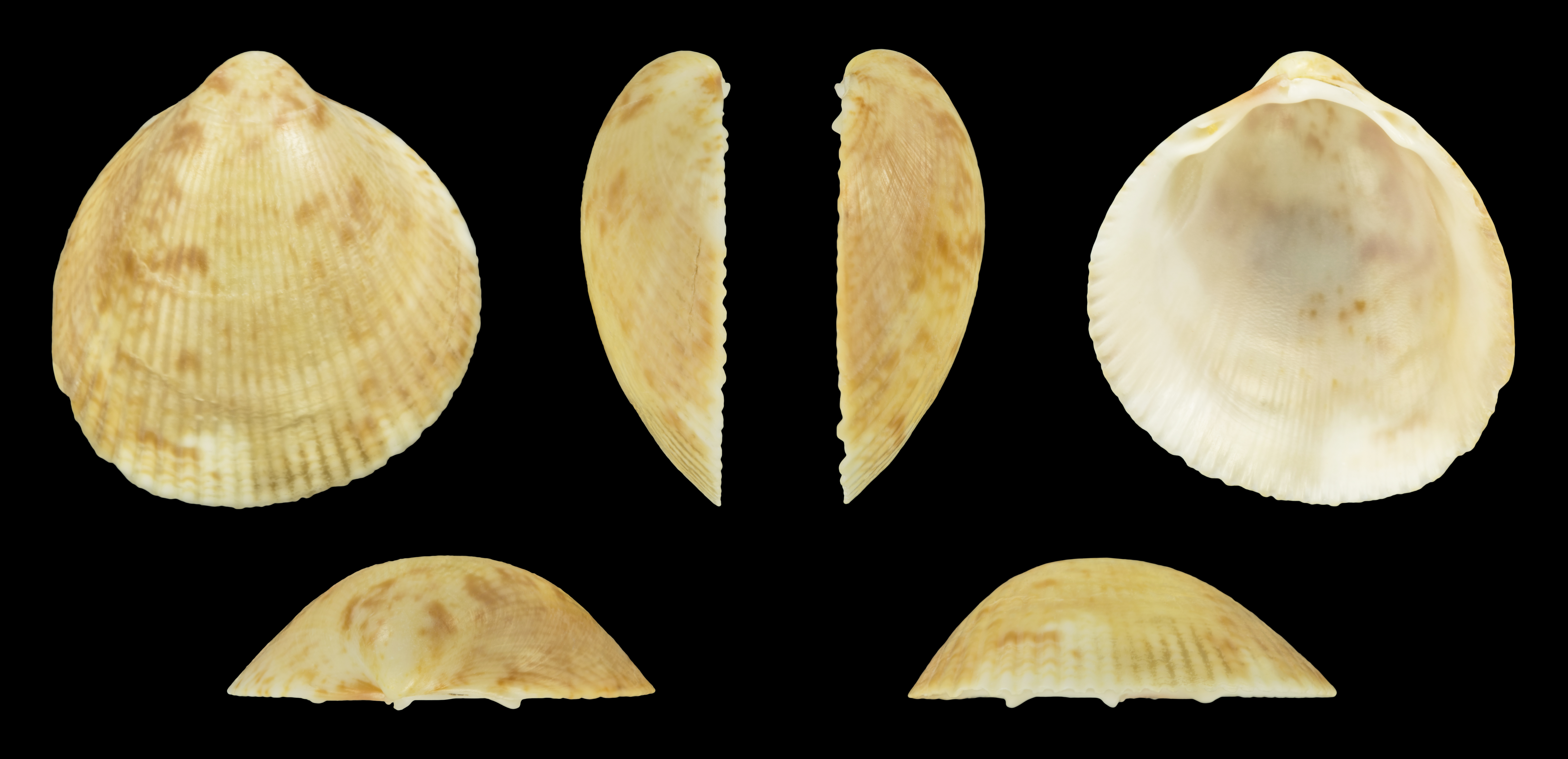
Right valve

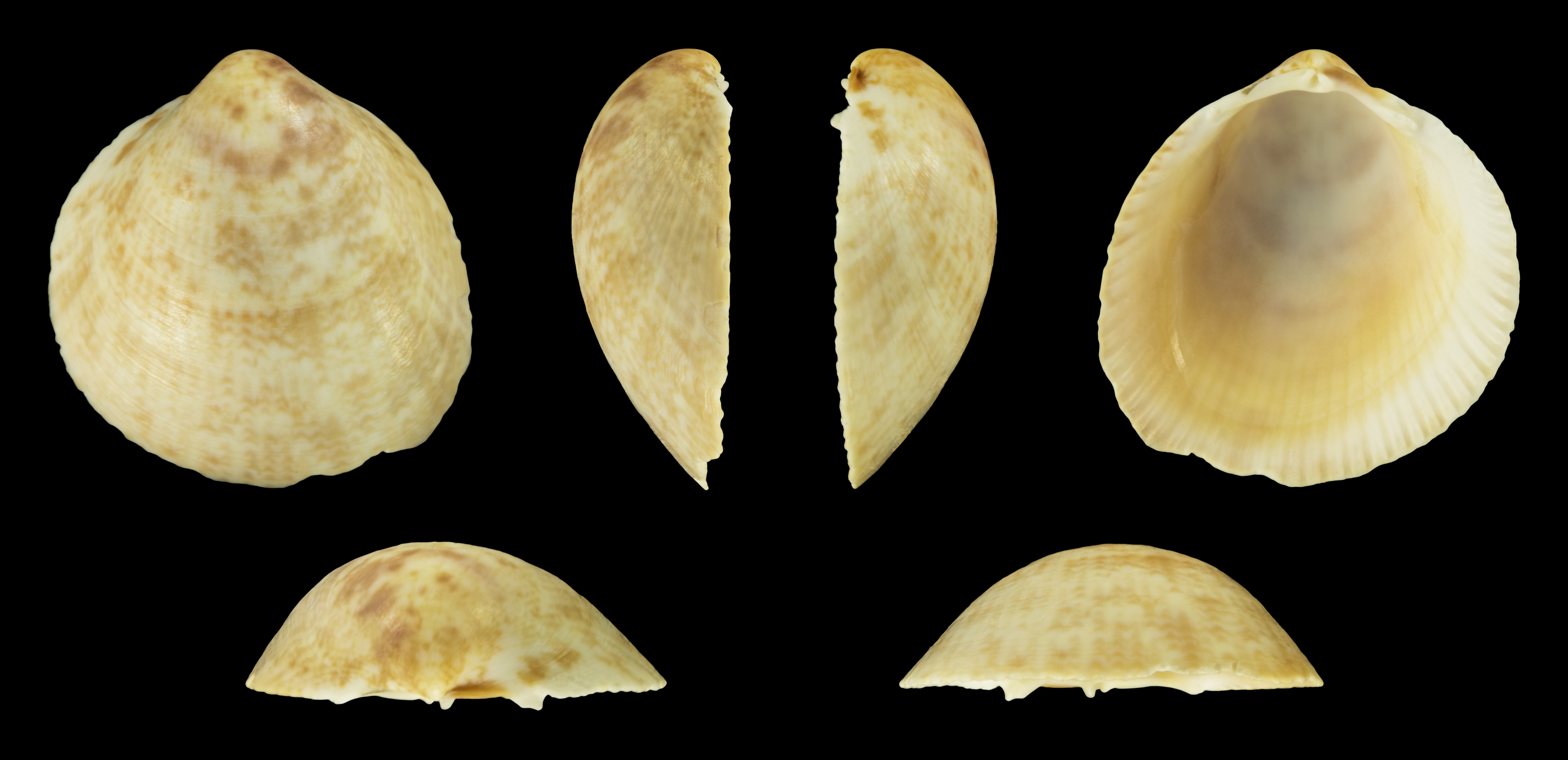
Left valve

== Distribution ==
This species is present in Northeast Atlantic and the Mediterranean, at depths of 9 to 200 m.

== Bibliography ==
- Gmelin, J.F., 1788-1793. In: Linné, C., Systema naturae, Edit. 13 aucta et reformata cura J.F. Gmelin. 10 vols, Lipsiae. 1788-1793 et Lugduni, 1789-1796. -1,6,
