= Robert Findlay (minister) =

Scottish minister (1721–1814)

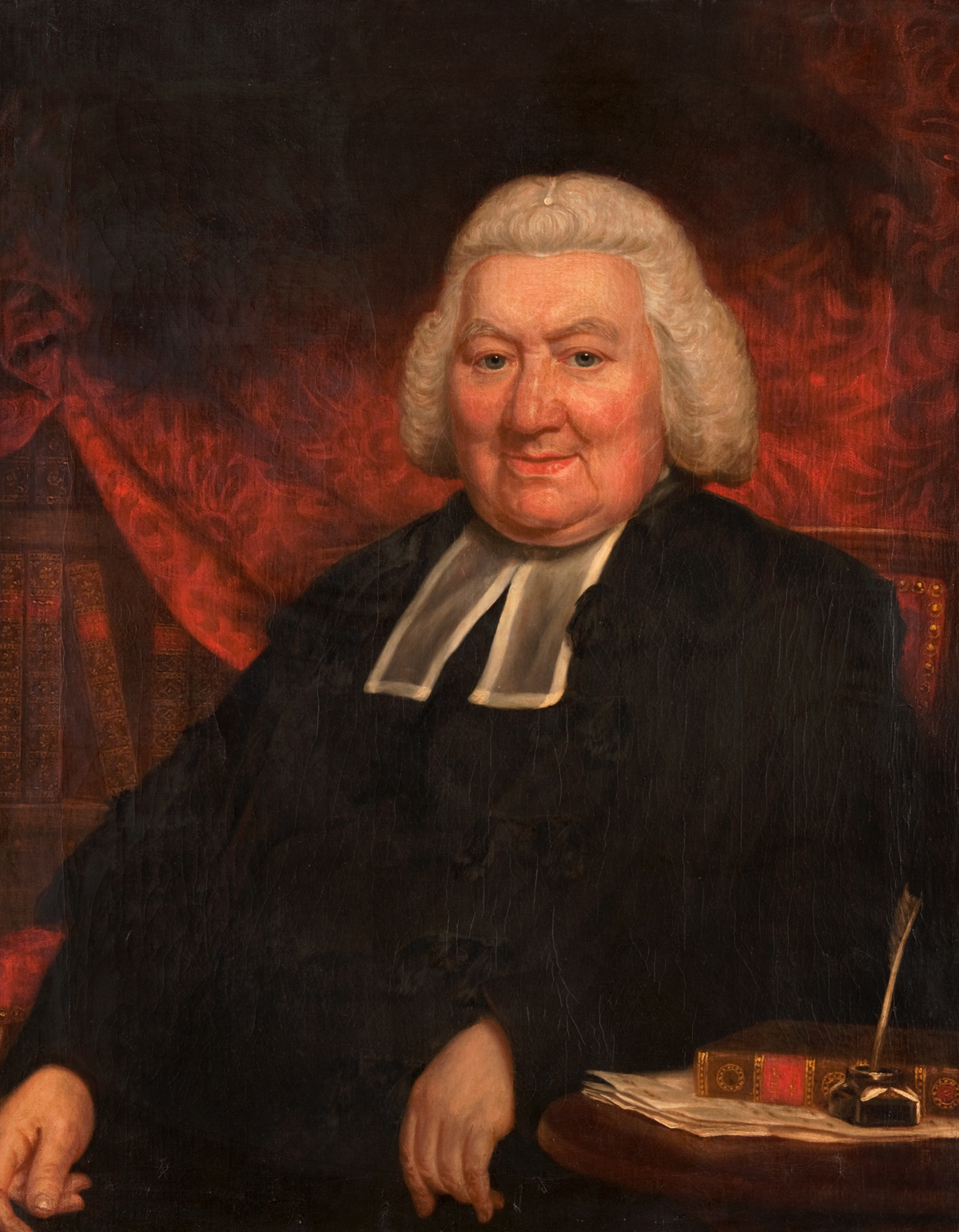
Robert Findlay

Robert Findlay FRSE (1721–1814), was a Scottish minister. In 1783 he was a co-founder of the Royal Society of Edinburgh along with many other leading figures of the Scottish Enlightenment.

== Life ==
Findlay was born in March 1721 the son of William Findlay, a merchant in Kilmarnock in Ayrshire. He was born 23 November 1721, was educated at Glasgow, Leyden, and Edinburgh, and was ordained a minister of the kirk of Scotland in 1744. He had charges successively at Stevenston (1743), Galston (1745), Paisley (1754), and St. David's Church, Glasgow (1756). He was given a Doctor of Divinity (DD) late in life (1776) by Glasgow University, and was appointed Professor of Divinity in the University of Glasgow in 1782, remaining in this role until death.

He died on 15 June 1814. He is buried in Ramshorn Cemetery on Ingram Street in Glasgow.

== Family ==
He was married to Annabella Paterson.

Their son Robert Findlay (1745–1862) was a merchant in Glasgow.

== Publications ==
He published in the 'Library' for July 1761 'A Letter to the Rev. Dr. Kennicott vindicating the Jews from the Charge of Corrupting Deut. xxvii. 4,' which, on Kennicott's replying in the 'Library,' he followed up with 'A Second Letter to Dr. Kennicott upon the same subject, being an Answer to the Remarks in the "Library" for August 1761, and a further illustration of the argument.' This letter he sent to the 'Library;' but the editor of that magazine having had enough of the controversy, it appeared separately in January 1762. Both letters were signed 'Philalethes.' A more ambitious task next engaged Findlay's attention, viz. an examination of the views on the credibility of Josephus and the Jewish and Christian Scriptures propounded by Voltaire in his 'Philosophie de l'Histoire.' This work appeared under the title of 'A Vindication of the Sacred Books and of Josephus, especially the former, from various misrepresentations and cavils of the celebrated M. de Voltaire,' Glasgow, 1770, 8vo. Findlay also published a pamphlet on 'The Divine Inspiration of the Jewish Scriptures and Old Testament,' London, 1803, 8vo.
