= Moses Griffith (artist) =

Welsh landscape artist

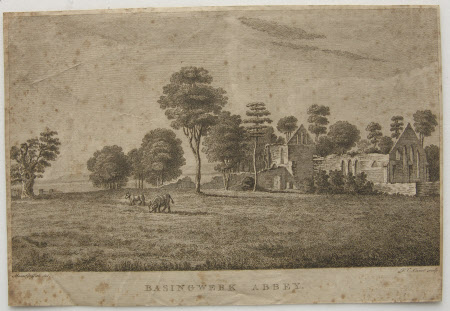
Engraving of Basingwerk Abbey by Pierre-Charles Canot, after a painting by Moses Griffith. About 1770.

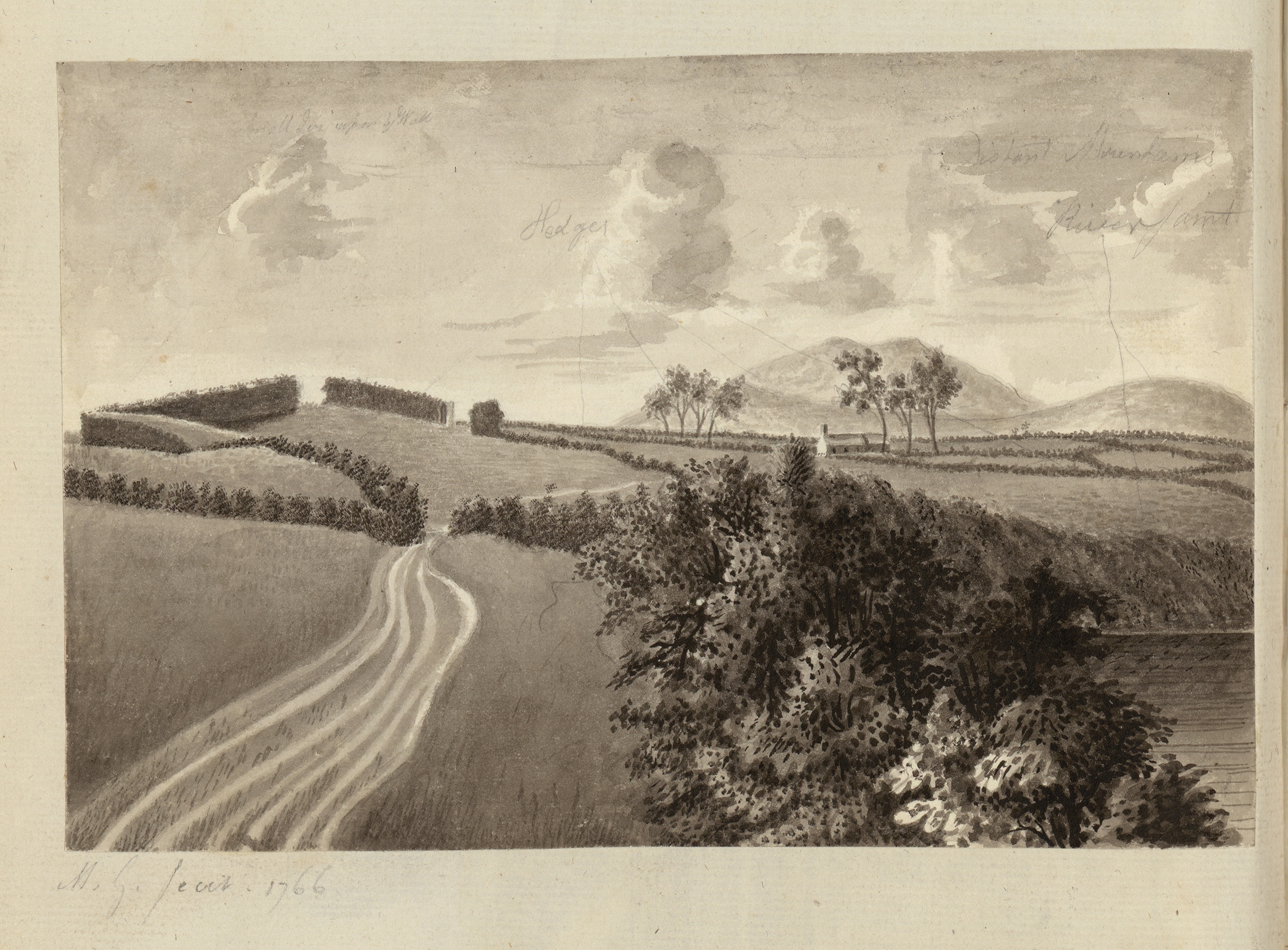
Annotated sketch by Moses Griffith, 1766

Moses Griffith (6 April 1747 – 11 November 1819) was a Welsh draughtsman, engraver and watercolourist.

Griffith was born at Trygarn House in the parish of Bryncroes on the Llŷn Peninsula, Caernarfonshire. His parents were of humble station, and he received a very elementary education but his artistic talent led to his being taken into service by Thomas Pennant about 1769. Pennant helped him to study drawing and engraving, and Griffith became his constant companion on his tours and excursions, making the drawings and engravings for Pennant's numerous works. Griffith became proficient both as a draughtsman and as an engraver. Griffith accompanied Pennant during his Tour of Wales and also visited Scotland, this became a basis of his career between 1769-1790. After Thomas's death, Griffith was employed by his son David and produced nearly 200 watercolours for him in Wales between 1805-1813.

On leaving Pennant's service he settled at Wibnant, near Holywell, Flintshire, where he obtained plenty of employment as an engraver. In 1809 he wrote a letter to the Gentleman's Magazine, defending himself from an attack. Francis Grose employed Griffith to engrave some of the plates in his Antiquities.

Griffith also painted watercolours of Welsh scenes, churches, country houses, and portraits, including two self-portraits. His work is to be found in the National Library of Wales, National Museum of Wales, British Museum and the Victoria and Albert Museum.

== Works ==
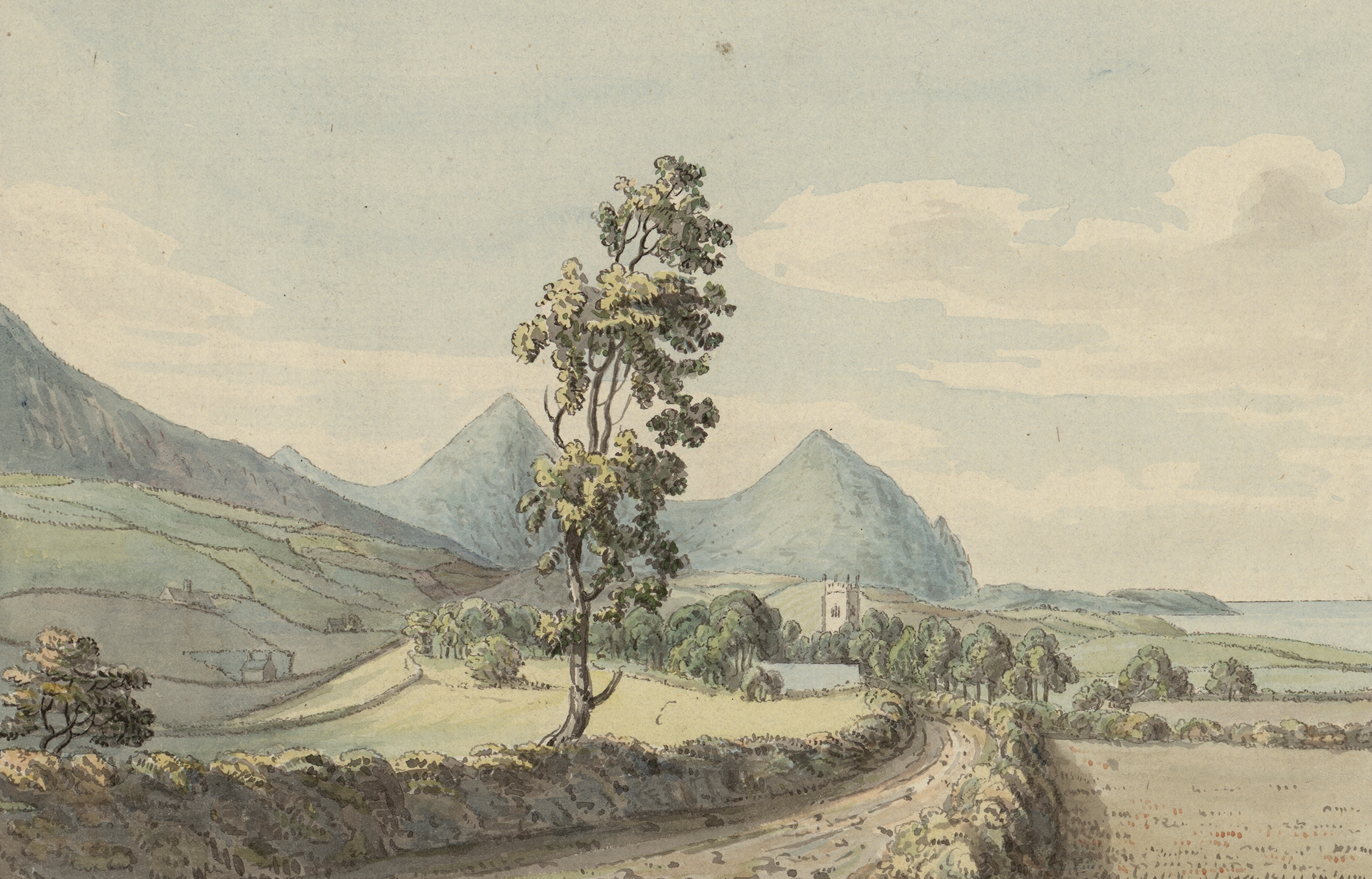
An original watercolour of Clynnog by Griffith (1782), from the National Library of Wales' extra-illustrated set of A Tour in Wales.

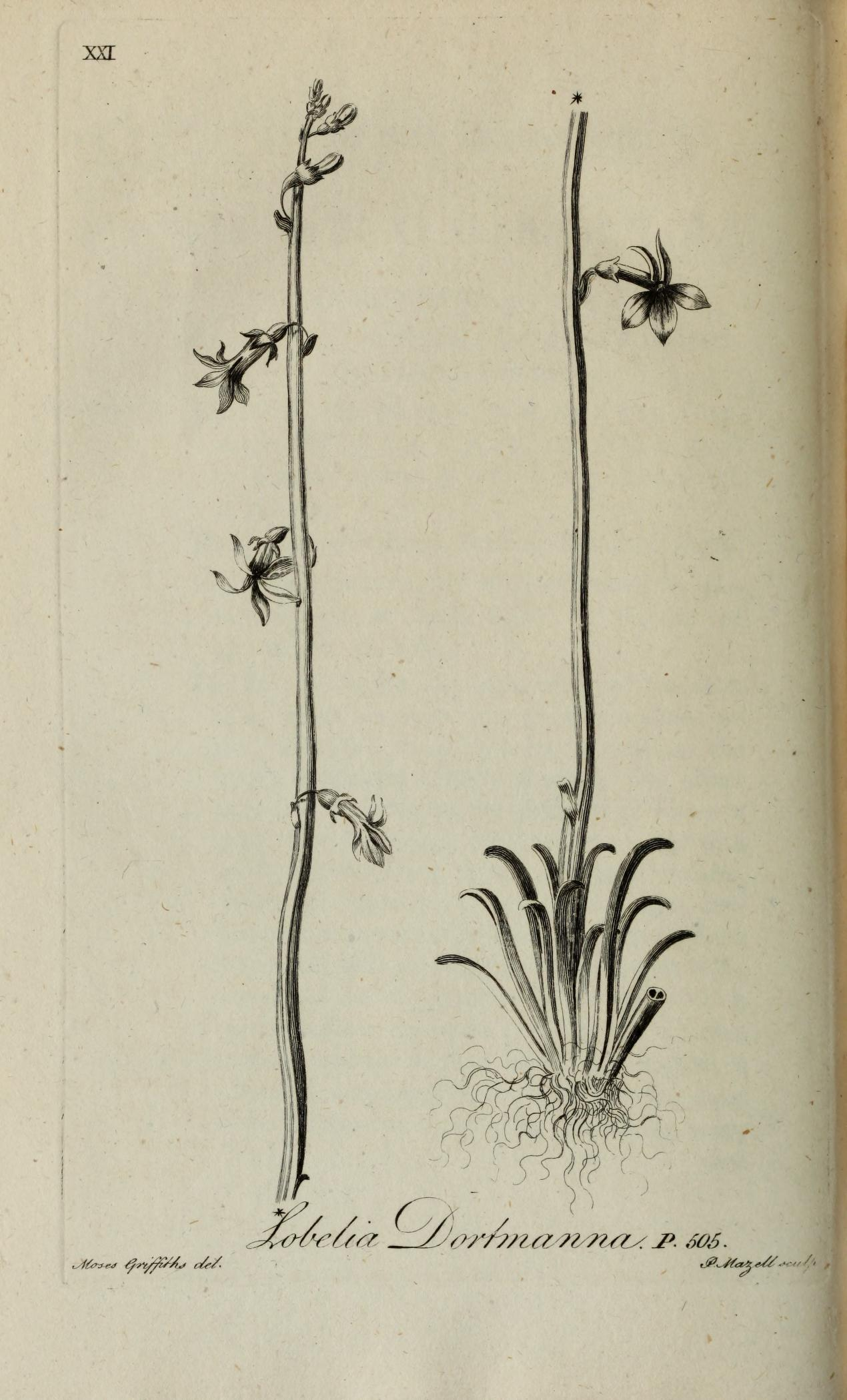
Lobelia dortmanna drawn by Griffith, engraved by Peter Mazell, from John Lightfoot's 1777 Flora Scotica

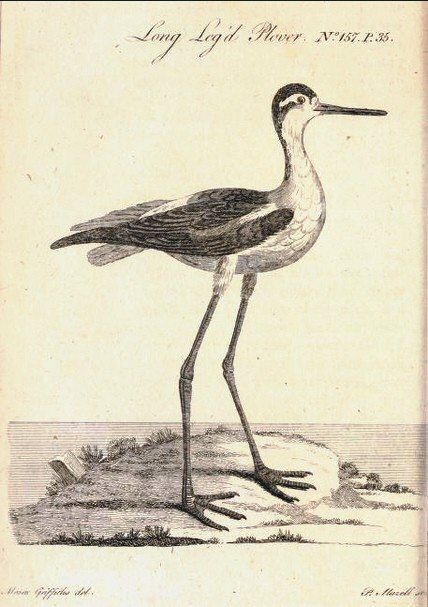
"Long Leg'd Plover" (black-winged stilt) in Flora Scotica, one of a few birds in the book. Drawn by Moses Griffith; engraved by Peter Mazell

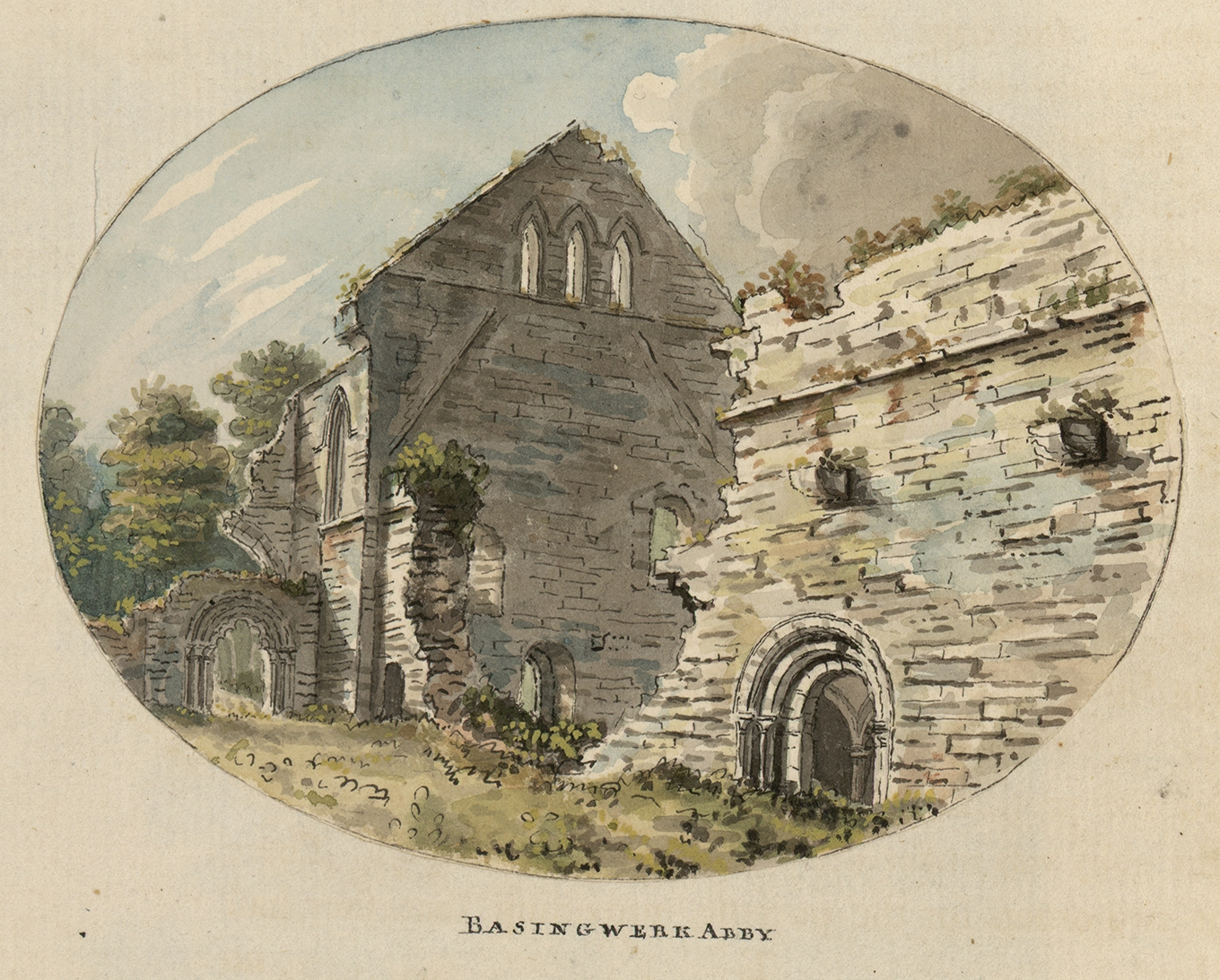
A miniature of Basingwerk Abbey from a unique set of eight extra-illustrated volumes of Thomas Pennant's A Tour in Wales owned by the National Library of Wales.

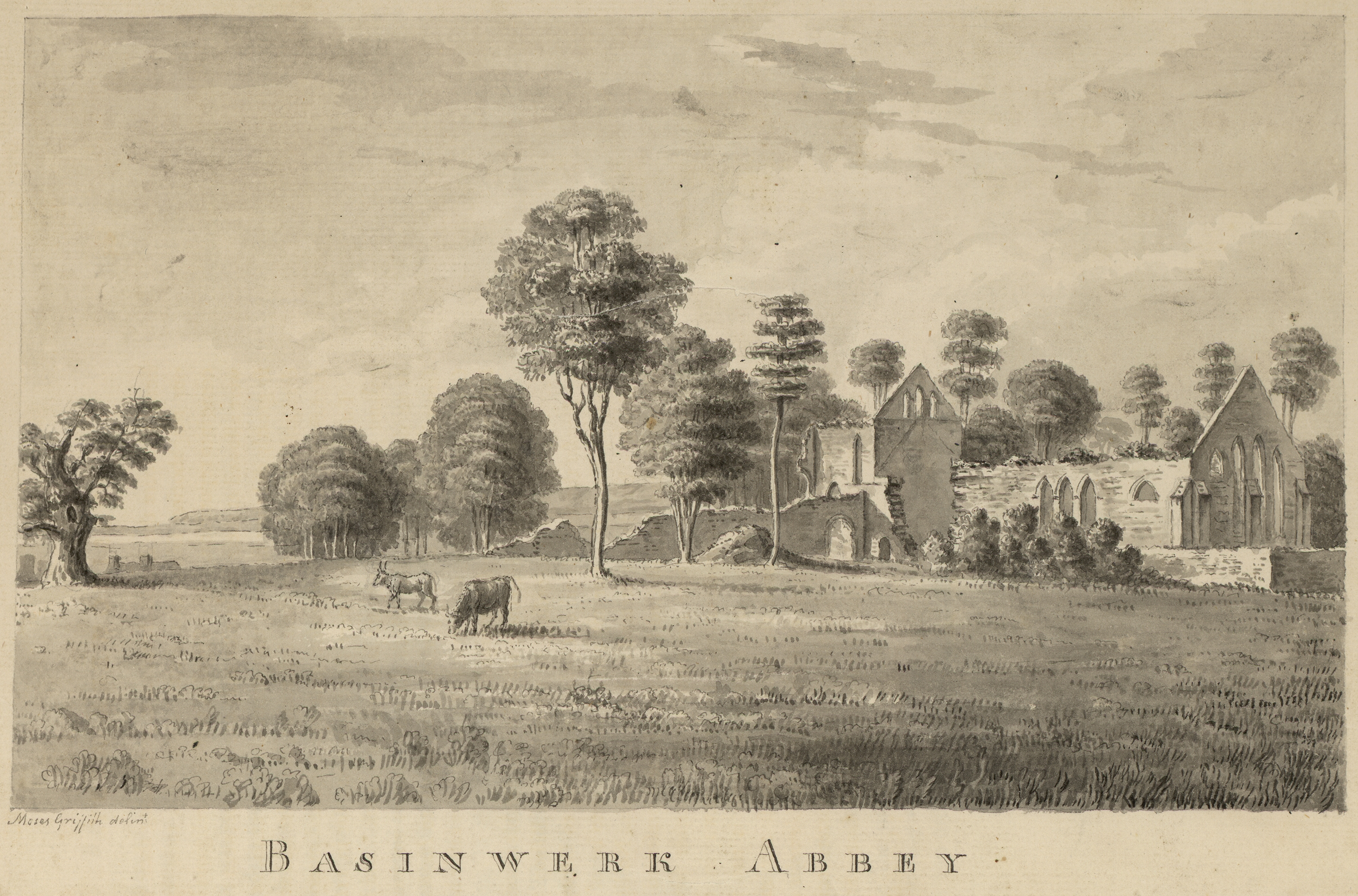
Another image of Basingwerk Abbey from Pennant's A Tour in Wales.

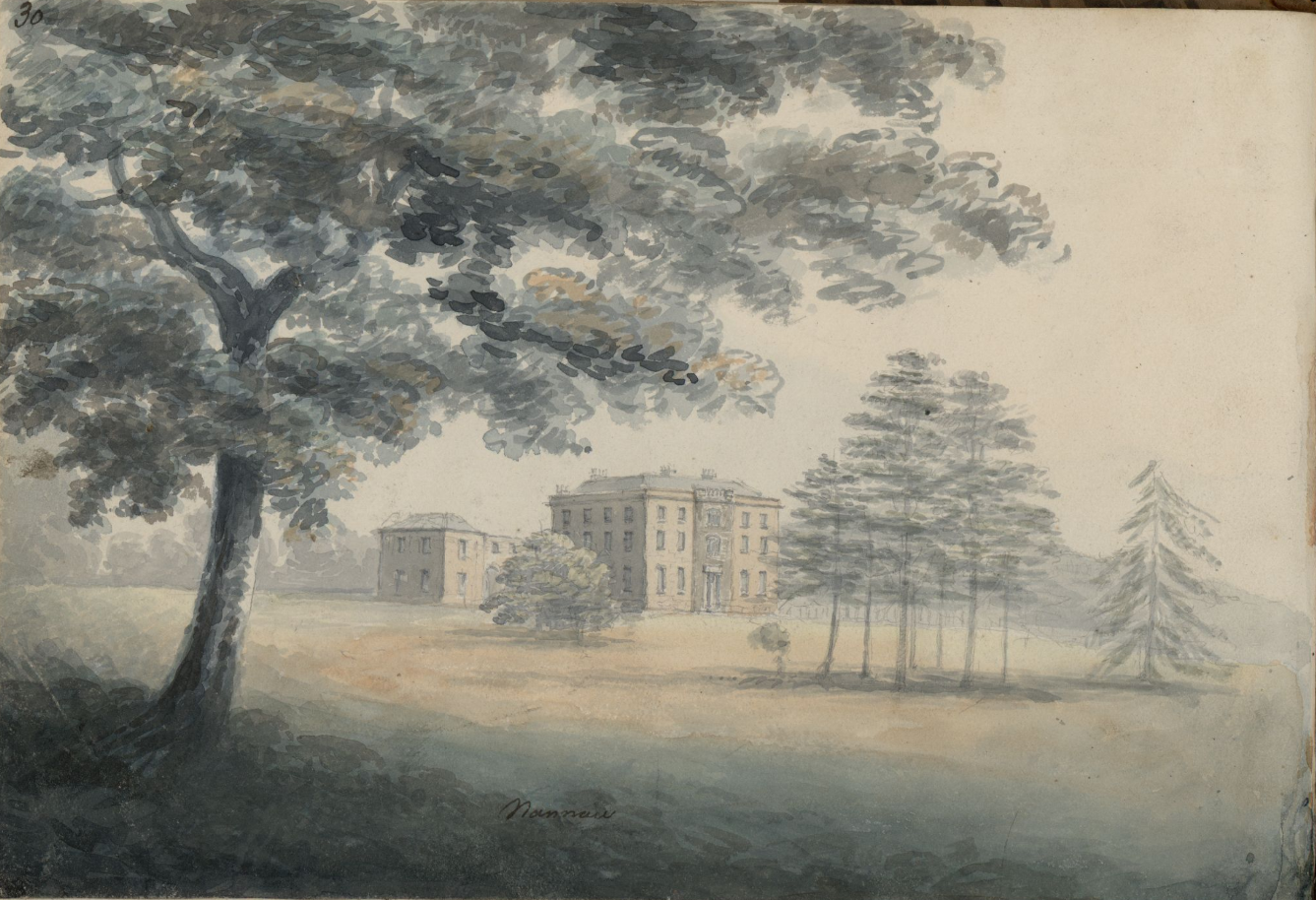
Nannau painted by Moses Griffith.

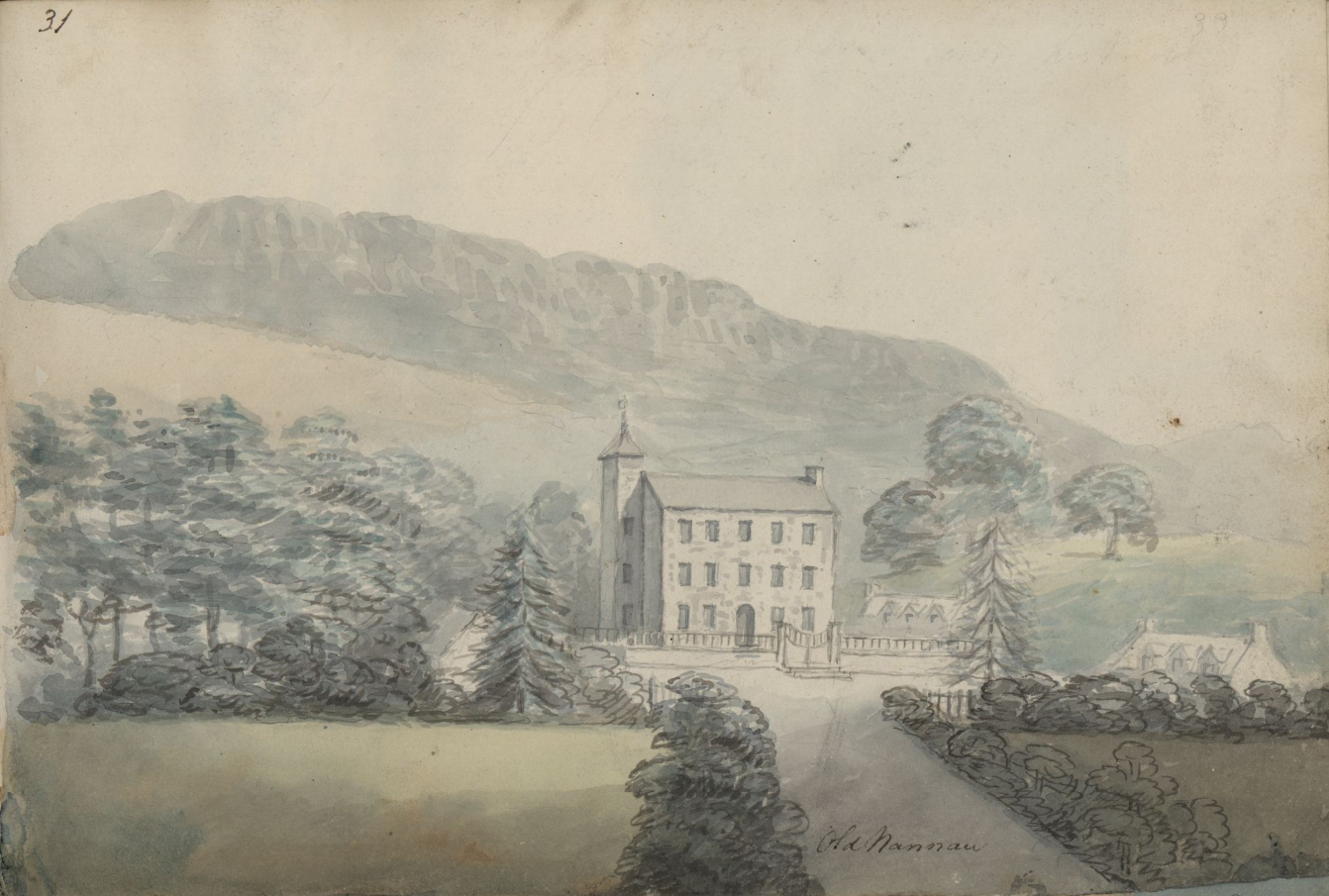
Old Nannau sketch by Moses Griffith 1797, built by Huw Nanney, circa. 1697.
