= Mostyn (surname) =

Mostyn is a habitational surname of Welsh origin. It comes from the place Mostyn, in Flintshire, Wales, UK. The village's name was originally derived from Old English mos, meaning 'bog', and tūn, meaning 'farm village'. The name is first recorded in the Flintshire area in the 13th century, in families descended from one of the 15 noble tribes of Wales. In the previous century, there had been lords of the manor of Mostyn, seated at Mostyn Hall. Spelling variations include Mostin, Mostyne, Mosten, and Mostine.

People with the surname Mostyn include:

- David Mostyn (cartoonist), British comic artist
- David Mostyn (British Army officer) (1928–2007), British Army officer
- Francis Mostyn (archbishop of Cardiff) (1860–1939), Roman Catholic prelate
- Francis Mostyn (Vicar Apostolic of the Northern District) (1800–1847), Roman Catholic prelate
- John Mostyn (governor) (1710–1779), British Army officer and colonial administrator
- John Mostyn (music manager), English music manager
- Matt Mostyn (born 1974), Irish-Australian rugby player
- Sir Nicholas Mostyn, High Court Judge in the Family Division
- Sir Pyers Charles Mostyn, 10th Baronet (1895–1917)
- Sir Roger Mostyn, 3rd Baronet (1673–1739), Welsh politician
- Sam Mostyn (born c. 1965), Australian businesswoman and Governor-General of Australia since 1 July 2024
- Savage Mostyn (c. 1713–1757), Royal Navy officer
- Thomas Mostyn (fl. 1695–1697), pirate and slave trader sailing between New York and Madagascar
- Thomas Lloyd-Mostyn (1830–1861), British politician
- William Mostyn (1836–1881), Irish-born Canadian doctor and politician
- William Mostyn (priest), 17th-century Welsh Anglican priest

== See also ==
- Baron Mostyn, a title was created in 1831 for Sir Edward Lloyd, 2nd Baronet
- Mostyn (disambiguation)
- Mostyn baronets, two lines of baronetcies created in the 17th century
