= Mostyn (disambiguation) =

Mostyn is a port village in Flintshire, north Wales.

Mostyn may also refer to:

== People ==
=== Surname and titles ===
- Mostyn (surname), including a list of people
- Baron Mostyn, in the Peerage of the United Kingdom
- Mostyn baronets, two lines of Welsh baronets
  - Edward Lloyd, 1st Baron Mostyn (1768–1854)
  - Edward Lloyd-Mostyn, 2nd Baron Mostyn (1795–1884)
- Gareth Williams, Baron Williams of Mostyn (1941–2003)
- Mostyn-Champneys baronets, County of Somerset

=== Given name ===
- Mostyn Armstrong (died 1791), English publisher of maps
- Moss Evans (1925–2002), British trade union leader
- Mostyn Ffrench-Williams (1914–1963), British swimmer
- Mostyn Hanger (1908–1980), Australian judge and administrator
- Mostyn Thomas (1896–1984), Welsh singer
- Barry Mostyn Chant (born 1938), Australian academic, pastor, and author

== Places ==
=== Cheshire ===
- Mostyn House School, Parkgate

=== Llandudno ===
- Mostyn (gallery)
- Mostyn (Llandudno electoral ward)

=== Mostyn ===
- Mostyn Colliery, a coal mine
- Mostyn Hall, a stately house
- Mostyn railway station
