= Thomas Mostyn =

Thomas Mostyn may refer to:

- Sir Thomas Mostyn, 2nd Baronet (1651–1692), one of the Mostyn baronets
- Thomas Mostyn (sea captain) (fl. 1695–1697), sea captain and slave trader
- Sir Thomas Mostyn, 4th Baronet (1704–1758), British landowner and politician
- Sir Thomas Mostyn, 6th Baronet (1776–1831), Welsh politician
- Thomas Lloyd-Mostyn (1830–1861), British politician
