= Roger Mostyn =

Roger Mostyn may refer to:

- Sir Roger Mostyn (MP, born 1567) (1567–1642), English politician, member of parliament (MP) for Flintshire, 1621–1622
- Sir Roger Mostyn, 3rd Baronet (1673–1739), Welsh Tory politician, MP for multiple constituencies, including Flintshire
- Sir Roger Mostyn, 5th Baronet (1734–1796), Welsh landowner and politician, MP for Flintshire, 1758–1796
- Roger Mostyn (priest) (1720–1775), canon of Windsor
- Roger Mostyn (footballer) (born 1953), Welsh footballer
