= High Sheriff of Flintshire =

Welsh county ceremonial officer

This is a list of High Sheriffs of Flintshire.

The High Sheriff is the oldest secular office under the Crown. Formerly, the High Sheriff was the principal law enforcement officer in the county, but over the centuries most of the responsibilities associated with the post have been transferred elsewhere or are now defunct, so that its functions are now largely ceremonial. The High Sheriff changes every March. The shrievalty of Flintshire, together with that of Denbighshire, was abolished in 1974 when the county and shrievalty of Clwyd was created.

== List of Sheriffs ==
=== 14th and 15th centuries ===
- 1309–11: Pain de Tipetot (Tiptoft)
- 1331: Robert de Praers(?)
- 1341?: William de Praers
- 1349–58: Rhys ap Roppert ap Gruffydd and Ithel ap Cynwrig Sais
- <1373: Adam de Kyngeslegh
- 1373–1378: Ralph de Davenport
- 1378: Morgan 'Yonge' ab Iorwerth ap Morgan
- 1390: Hywel ap Tudur ab Ithel Fychan
- 1396(–1399?): Nicholas Hauberk
- 1399: Henry Hotspur Percy (killed 1403)
- 1407–1416: Roger Leche
- 1417–1458: Thomas Rempston

=== 16th century ===
- 1516–1528: Ralph Egerton of Ridley
- 1532–1536: William and Roger Brereton (jointly)
- 1536–1538: Percival Hart
- 1538: John Brereton
- 1538–1540: Uriah and Roger Brereton
- 1541: Sir Giles Puleston
- 1542: Sir Thomas Hanmer
- 1543: Sir John Holforde, Kt and John Edwards I of Chirkland
- 1545: Ralph (or Randolph) Lloyd
- 1546: John Edwards
- 1547: Henry Conway
- 1548: John Griffith of Caerwys
- 1549: Sir Thomas Salisbury, Kt
- 1550: Sir Thomas Massy, Kt
- 1551: John David (or Davies)
- 1552: Richard Grosvenor
- 1553: Peter Mostyn of Talacre
- 1554: Sir Thomas Hanmer of Hanmer
- 1555: Ralph Dutton
- 1556: Sir Roger Bruton (or Brereton)
- 1557: John Griffith of Caerwys
- 1558: Humphrey Dymock
- 1559: John Conway (snr) of Bodrhyddan
- 1560: William Hanmer, snr.
- 1561: William Mostyn of Mostyn Hall
- 1562: John Trevor of Trevalyn
- 1563: Henry ap Parry of Greenfield
- 1564: William Mostyn, jnr.
- 1565: John Griffith of Caerwys
- 1566: William Mostyn of Mostyn Hall
- 1567: Roger Brereton
- 1568: Roger Puleston I of Emral
- 1569: John Trevor of Trevalyn
- 1570: Sir Thomas Hanmer of Hanmer
- 1571: William Mostyn of Mostyn Hall
- 1572: John Griffith of Caerwys
- 1573: Peter Mostyn, jun, of Talacre
- 1574: Roger Puleston II of Emral
- 1575: Lancelot Bostock of Flintshire and London
- 1576: William Mostyn, jnr
- 1577: John Edwards of Chirk
- 1578: Thomas Mostyn of Mostyn Hall
- 1579: George Ravenscroft of Bretton and Hawarden
- 1580: Henry ap Harry (or Parry) of Greenfield
- 1581: Roger Brereton of Hawton
- 1582: Peter Gruffyth of Caerwys?
- 1583: Sir Hugh Cholmondeley, Kt
- 1584: John Hanmer of Hanmer
- 1585: John Conway (jnr) of Bodrhyddan
- 1586: John Hope of Broughton Hall, Hawarden
- 1587: Thomas Mostyn of Mostyn Hall
- 1588: William Hanmer of Fenns
- 1589: Peter Mostyn of Talacre
- 1590: Peter Gruffith of Caerwys
- 1591: John Lloyd (Registrar of St. Asaph)
- 1592: Roger Brereton of Halghton, Bangor Iscoed, Flintshire and Hinton, Whitchurch, Salop
- 1593: Evan Edwards
- 1594: William Griffith, of Paiay Lloyd
- 1595: Thomas Ravenscroft
- 1596: Robert Davies of Gwisaney
- 1597: Sir William Hanmer, Kt of the Fenns
- 1598: Roger Puleston of Emral, Worthenbury
- 1599: Thomas Evans
- 1600: John Conway, Jnr of Botrithan

=== 17th century ===
- 1601: William Dymock of Willington
- 1602: Roger Salusbury of Bachegraig
- 1603: John Lloyd of Vaynol
- 1604: John Lloyd of Vaynol
- 1604: George Hope
- 1605: Sir John Conway of Ruthland, Kt.
- 1606: Sir Thomas Hanmer, Kt. of Hanmer
- 1607: Thomas Ravenscroft of Brereton
- 1608: Robert Davies of Gwysaney
- 1609: Sir Roger Mostyn, Kt. of Mostyn Hall
- 1610: Sir William Hanmer, Kt. of Fenns
- 1611: Thomas Hughes of Prestatyn
- 1612: Peter Pennant of Bighton
- 1613: Thomas Mostyn of Llysaelrhyd
- 1614: Sir Richard (or Thomas) Trevor, Kt.
- 1615: Thomas Griffith of Pant y llwyn du
- 1616: Roger Salisbury of Bachegraig
- 1617: Sir Thomas Hanmer, Kt. of Hanmer
- 1618: William Dymock of Willington
- 1619: Pierce Holland
- 1620: Thomas Humfreys of Bodelwyddan
- 1621: Edward Morgan of Golden Grove and Weppre, Flintshire
- 1622: Sir John Hanmer, 1st Baronet of Hanmer
- 1623: Thomas Jones of Halkin
- 1624: John Broughton
- 1625: Thomas Evans of Northop
- 1626: Sir Thomas Brereton, Kt
- 1627: Sir Roger Mostyn, Kt of Mostyn Hall
- 1628: Thomas Mostyn of Rhyd
- 1629: Sir Philipp Oldfield, Kt.
- 1630: Edward Hughes of Galchog
- 1631: Piers Conway
- 1632: Humfrey Dymocke
- 1633: Thomas Pennant of Bighton
- 1634: Richard Parry of Cwm
- 1635: Peter Griffith of Caerwys
- 1636: Thomas Salisbury of Ledbrook
- 1637: Thomas Mostyn of Rhyd
- 1638: Thomas Whitely of Aston
- 1639: John Eyton of Leeswood, Mold
- 1640: Ralph Hughes of Dyserth
- 1641: John Jones of Halkin
- 1642: David Pennant of Bychton
- 1643: George Hope of Doddleston
- 1644–1646: Robert Davies of Gwysaney
- 1647: Luke Lloyd
- 1648: Robert Hanmer
- 1649: Edward Lloyd
- 1649: Thomas Ravenscroft
- 1650: Humphrey Dymock of Willington
- 1651: Thomas Lloyd of Halton
- 1652: John Broughton of Broughton
- 1653: Piers Conway
- 1654: John Parry of Combe
- 1655: Peter Foulkes of Llanasaph
- 1656: Thomas Dymock of Willington
- 1657:Henry Conway of Bodrhyddan
- 1658–59: Ralph Hughes of Dyserth
- 1660: Robert Davies of Gwysaney
- 1661: John Wynne
- 1662: Roger Puleston
- 1663: Robert Wynne
- 1664: Thomas Lloyd
- 1665: John Salisbury
- 1666: Sir Roger Mostyn, 1st Baronet, of Mostyn Hall
- 1667: Robert Mostyn, of Nant
- 1668: William Griffith
- 1669: John Broughton
- 1670: Mutton Davies, of Llanerch, Denbighshire and Gwysaney
- 1671: Sir Philip Twisleton, Bt
- 1672: Thomas Humphreys
- 1673: Sir William Glynne, 1st Baronet of Bicester, Oxon. and Hawarden Castle
- 1674: William Crompton of Chester
- 1675: Owen Wynn of Nant
- 1676: Owen Barton of Knowlton
- 1677: Peter Pennant
- 1678: Thomas Heath then William Philips
- 1679: John Roden of Iscoed (died in office) and replaced by Humphrey Dymocke of Willington
- 1680: Thomas Pinder of Nerquis
- 1681: Thomas Evans of Northop Hall
- 1682: Thomas Edwards of Rhual
- 1683: William (or John) Lloyd of Halton
- 1684: Thomas Eaton
- 1685: Griffith Edwards of Cefn Kilken
- 1686: Sir John Conway, 2nd Baronet of Soughton and Bodrhyddan
- 1687: George Hope of Broughton
- 1688: Sir John Egerton, 3rd Baronet
- 1689: William Hanmer of Bletchfield then Richard Mostyn then Thomas Williams of Halkin
- 1690: Robert Davies of Gwisaney, then John Langley of Mold then Thomas Lloyd of Dwernhayled
- 1691: Hugh Griffiths of Caerwys
- 1692: William Hanmer of Bettisfield
- 1693: Thomas Ravenscroft of Broadlane, Hawarden
- 1694: Thomas Hanmer then Thomas Lloyd then Josiah Jones of Oakenholt
- 1695: Josias Jones of Oakenholt
- 1696: John Wynne of Gop
- 1697: John Lloyd of Ledbrook
- 1698: Owen Barton of Knowlton
- 1699: Roger Pennant of Bagillt
- 1700: John Lloyd of Ledbrook

=== 18th century ===
- 1701: Edward Morgan of Golden Grove
- 1702: Thomas Baldwin of Llanasaph
- 1703: Thomas Lloyd of Cefn
- 1704: Robert Davies of Gwysaney and Llanerch
- 1705: Roger Mostin of Cilken
- 1706: John Whitehall of Broughton
- 1707: William Hanmer of Fenns
- 1708: Thomas Mostin of Rhyd
- 1709: Roger Price of Vaenol
- 1710: Thomas Pennant of Downing
- 1711: John Lloyd of Downing
- 1712: Thomas Eyton of Leeswood
- 1713: John (or Thomas) Williams of Nerquis
- 1714: Richard Jones of Hendre
- 1715: John Wynne of Tower
- 1716: Josias Jones of Oakenholt, died and replaced by Humphrey Jones of Croesnewydd
- 1717: William Young of Bryn Yorkin
- 1718: John Middleton of Gwaenynog
- 1719: William Brock of Bryncoed
- 1720: Evan Lloyd of Halkin
- 1721: Robert Crompton of Kinnerton
- 1722: Thomas Hughes of Northop
- 1722–1724: Sir George Wynne, 1st Baronet of Leeswood Hall, Mold
- 1724: Sir Stephen Glynne, 4th Baronet
- 1724–1726: Peter Pennant of Bighton
- 1726: Thomas Lloyd of Halton
- 1726: Broughton Whitehall of Broughton
- 1727: William Wynne of Bryngwyn
- 1728: Maurice Wynne of Plas-yn-y-coed
- 1729: Thomas Whitley of Aston
- 1730: Edward Dimmock of Penley
- 1731: Thomas Wynne of Maes-y-Coed
- 1732: Robert Price of Kilken
- 1733: Richard Williams of Penbew'd
- 1734: David Foulkes of Gwernigron
- 1735: Thomas Griffith of Cilken
- 1736: Humphrey Parry of Pwllalog and Llywnynn
- 1737: Francis Price of Bryn-y-Pys
- 1738: Edward Morgan of Golden Grove, Flintshire
- 1739: David Pennant of Downing and Bychton
- 1740: Thomas Wynne, Jnr of Llwynegrin
- 1741: Henry Lloyd of Rhyl
- 1742: William Myddelton of Skiviog
- 1743: Hugh Hughes of Coed-y-Braine
- 1744: Robert Davies of Gwysanney
- 1745: Bagot Read of Coed Onn
- 1746: Sir Thomas Longueville, 4th Baronet of Prestatyn
- 1747: Thomas Hughes of Halkin
- 1748: William Dymock of Penley
- 1749: John Broughton Whitehall of Broughton
- 1750: Ellis Yonge of Bryn Yorkin
- 1751–1752: Sir John Glynne, 6th Baronet of Hawarden Castle
- 1753: Peter Morgan of Golden Grove, Flintshire (son of Edward, HS 1738)
- 1754: Edward Pennant of Bagillt
- 1755: Richard Coytmore of Plas Onn
- 1756: John Barker of Overton
- 1757: John Wright of Plas Isa
- 1758: Robert Parry of Pwllhalog
- 1759: William Davies, of Henfryn
- 1760: John Williams of Garnedd Wen
- 1761: Thomas Thomas of Downing
- 1762: Thomas Pennant of Downing and Bychton
- 1763: Humphrey Hanmer of Bettisfield
- 1764: Edward Lloyd of Pentre Robin
- 1765: Richard Parry Price of Bryn-y-Pys
- 1766: John Edwards of Llan-y-cefn
- 1767: Thomas Kyffin of Coed-y-Brain
- 1768: Phillips Lloyd Fletcher of Gwernhailod
- 1769: Edward Lloyd, later Sir Edward Pryce Lloyd, 1st Baronet of Pengwern
- 1770: Thomas Griffith of Rhual
- 1771: Paul Panton of Bagillt
- 1772: Thomas Eyton of Leeswood
- 1773: John Ellis Mostin of Calcot
- 1774: John Puleston of Emral
- 1775: Owen Wynne of Overton
- 1776: John Davies of Gwysaney
- 1777: Robert Foulks of Gwernygron
- 1778: Richard Allen of Bistree
- 1779: Richard Hill Waring of Leeswood
- 1780: John Wynne of Soughton
- 1781: Henry Thrale, of Bachegrig
- 1782: Thomas FitzMaurice
- 1783: George William Prescott, of Hawarden
- 1784: Thomas Patton of Flint
- 1785: Sir Thomas Hanmer of Hanmer, Bt
- 1786: John Edwards of Kelsterton
- 1787: Philip Yorke of Maes-y-Groes
- 1788: John Fitzgerald of Bettisfield
- 1789: Richard Wilding of Prestatyn
- 1790: Charles Brown of Llwynegryn
- 1791: Gwyllym Lloyd Wardle of Hartsheath, near Mold
- 1792: Edward Morgan of Golden Grove, Flintshire (son of Peter, HS 1752
- 1793: Richard Puleston of Emral
- 1794: Daniel Leo of Llanerch
- 1794: John Williams, later Sir John Williams, 1st Baronet of Bodelwyddan
- 1795: Bromfield Foulkes of Gwern-y-gron
- 1796: Sir Edward Pryce Lloyd, 2nd Baronet of Pengwern Place
- 1797: John Edwards Maddocks of Vron View
- 1798: John Jones of St. Asaph
- 1799: Thomas Mostyn Edwards of Kilken Hall
- 1800: James Mainwaring, of Saltney

=== 19th century ===
- 11 February 1801: David Pennant, of Downing
- 3 February 1802: Sir Stephen Glynne, 8th Baronet, of Broad Lane
- 3 February 1803: Owen Molyneux Wynne, of Overton
- 1 February 1804: Richard Garnons the younger, of Leetwood
- 6 February 1805: Thomas Foulkes, of Gwernygron
- 7 March 1805: Edward Lloyd Lloyd, of Erbistock
- 1 February 1806: Thomas Thomas, of Downing
- 4 February 1807: Samuel Mostyn, of Nantgwelun
- 3 February 1808: Thomas Lloyd, of Trebierdd
- 6 February 1809: Thomas Peate, of Bistree
- 1 March 1809: Owen Ellis, of Eyton
- 31 January 1810: Francis Richard Price, of Bryn-y-Pys
- 8 February 1811: Sir George Beeston Prescott, 2nd Baronet, of Ewloe
- 24 January 1812: Hugh Humphreys, of Penypylle
- 10 February 1813: Cadwallader Blayney Trevor-Roper, of Plas Teg
- 4 February 1814: Roger Ellis, of Cornist
- 13 February 1815: Sir Richard Brooke, 6th Baronet, of Hope Hall
- 17 March 1815: Paul Panton, of Coleshill
- 1816: George Boscawen of Trevalyn
- 1816: John Salusbury Piozzi Salusbury, of Bryn Bella
- 1817: William Rigby, of Northrop Hall
- 1818: John Wynne Eyton, of Leeswood
- 1819: Ralph Richardson, of Greenfield Hall
- 1820: Janes Knight, of Rhual
- 1821: John Douglas, of Gyrne
- 1822: Thomas Harrison, of Saithaelwyd
- 1823: Philip Davies Cooke, of Gwysaney
- 1824: Robert John Mostyn, of Calcot Hall
- 1825: John Lloyd Wynne, of Plasnewydd
- 1826: John Price, of Hope Hall
- 1827: Jones Panton, of Coleshill
- 1828: George Watkin Kenrick, of Mertyn
- 1829: Edward Pemberton, of Plas Isa
- 1830: Sir Henry Browne, of Bronwhwylfa
- 1831: Sir Stephen Glynne, 9th Baronet, of Hawarden Castle
- 1832: Sir John Hanmer, 3rd Baronet, of Bettisfield Park
- 1833: William Thomas Ellis, of Cornist
- 1834: Frederick Charles Philips, of Rhual
- 1835: Charles Blaney Trevor-Roper, of Plasteg
- 1836: Sir John Hay Williams, 2nd Baronet, of Bodelwyddan
- 1837: Sir Edward Mostyn, 7th Baronet, of Talacre
- 1838: Edward Morgan, of Golden Grove, Holywell
- 1839: John Offley Crewe Read, of Hawarden
- 1840: William Shipley Conway, of Bodryddan
- 1841: Llewellyn Lloyd, of Pontriffith
- 1842: Edward Dymock, of Penley Hall was initially appointed, but was replaced by Llewellyn Lloyd, of Pontriffith
- 1843: Sir Pyers Mostyn, 8th Baronet, of Talacre
- 1844: Sir Richard Puleston, 2nd Baronet, of Emral
- 1845: Ralph Richardson, of Greenfield Hall
- 1846: Samuel Henry Thompson, of Bryncoch
- 1847: Llewelyn Falkner Lloyd, of Nannerch
- 1848: Sir William Clerke, 9th Baronet, of Merton
- 1849: Philip Lake Godsal, of Iscoyd Park
- 1850: Rudolph Feilding, Viscount Feilding, of Downing
- 1851: Wilson Jones, of Hartsheath Park
- 1852: Henry Potts, of Glan-r-afon
- 1853: Whitehall Dod, of Llanerch
- 1854: Henry Raikes, of Llwynegrim
- 1855: Arthur Hill-Trevor, 3rd Viscount Dungannon, of Brynkinalt
- 1856: Frederick Philips, of Rhûal
- 1857: Robert Wills, of Plasbellin
- 1858: Philip Bryan Davies Cooke, of Gwynsaney Hall
- 1859: Philip William Godsal, of Iscoyd Park
- 1860: Howel Maddock Arthur Jones, of Wepre Hall
- 1861: Robert Howard, of Broughton Hall
- 1862: Philip Pennant Pennant, of Bodfari
- 1863: Charles Butler Clough, of Llwyn Offa
- 1864: William Barber Buddicom, of Penbedw
- 1865: Bryan George Davies Cooke, of Colomendy
- 1866: John Carstairs Jones, of Hartsheath Park
- 1867: Thomas Hanmer Wynne, of Nerquis Hall
- 1868: Richard Pelham Warren, of Hope Open
- 1869: John Scott Bankes, of Soughton Hall
- 1870: Edmund Peel, of Bryn-y-pys
- 1871: Hugh Robert Hughes, of Kinmel
- 1872: Edwin William Philips, of Rhual
- 1873: Thomas Griffies Dixon, of Nant
- 1874: William Keates, of Greenfield
- 1875: John Churton, of Môranedd
- 1876: Conwy Grenville Hercules Rowley Conwy, of Bodrhyddan
- 1877: Pennant Athelwold Lloyd, of Pentrehobin
- 1878: Charles James Trevor Roper, of Plas Têg
- 1879: Meadows Frost, of Meadowslea
- 1880: William Johnson, of Broughton Hall
- 1881: Arthur Mesham, of Pontryffydd
- 1882: Sir William Grenville Williams, 4th Baronet of Bodelwyddan
- 1883: Robert Frost, of Mount Kinnerton
- 1884: Richard Muspratt, of Trelawny House, Flint
- 1885: Sir Wyndham Edward Hanmer, 4th Baronet of Bettisfield Park
- 1886: Robert James Sisson, of Talardy
- 1887: Thomas Bate, of Kelstcrton
- 1888: William Henry Gladstone, of Hawarden Castle
- 1889: Edward Walthall Delves Walthall, of The Cottage, St. Asaph
- 1890: Richard Venables Kyrke, of Pen-y-wern
- 1891: Charles Davison, of Farfield
- 1892: Richard Henry Venables Kyrke of Nantyffrith
- 1893: Sir Pyers William Mostyn, 9th Baronet of Talacre
- 1894: Edward Hunter Wain, of Fron Hall
- 1895: Wilson Carstairs Jones, of Hartsheath Park
- 1896: Harry William Buddicom, of Penbedw
- 1897: James Liebig Muspratt, of Bron Haul, Rhyl
- 1898: Michael Antonio Ralli, of Morannedd, Rhyl
- 1899: Sir Edward Percy Bates, 2nd Baronet of Gyrn Castle, Llanasa
- 1900: Henry Hurlbutt, of Dee Cottage, Queen's Ferry

=== 20th century ===
- 1901: Philip Thomas Godsal, of Iscoyd Park
- 1902: Sir Wyndham Charles Henry Hanmer, 6th Baronet of Bettisfield Park, Whitchurch
- 1903: John Watkinson, of Brook Park, Northop
- 1904: Horace Mayhew, of Broughton Hall, Flintshire
- 1905: William John Patrickson Storey, of Preswylfa, Rhyl
- 1906: James Williams of Lincoln College, Oxford,
- 1907: Lieutenant – Colonel Edward Lloyd, of Hafod, Mold
- 1908: Sydney Knowles Muspratt, of Windsor buildings, George Street, Liverpool
- 1909: John Lloyd-Price, of Glyn Abbot, Holywell
- 1910: Frederick Leigh Hancock, of Warren Bank, Broughton, near Chester
- 1911: Arthur Phillips Roberts, of Coed du Park, Mold
- 1912: Trevor Eyton, of Coed Mawr, Greenfield, near Holywell
- 1913: Joseph Henry Warburton Lee, of Broad Oak, Whitchurch, Salop
- 1914: John Kerfoot Evans, of Greenfield House, Holywell
- 1915: Philip Tatton Davies-Cooke, of Gwysaney, Mold
- 1916: William Davey, of Maesmynan Hall, Caerwys
- 1917: Lieut.-Colonel Henry Hurlbutt, of Llwyn Offa, Mold
- 1918: Frank Hurlbutt, of Penyffordd House, Penyffordd, near Chester
- 1919: John Sheriff Roberts, of The Gables, Curzon Park, Chester
- 1920: David Falconer Pennant, of Nantlys, St. Asaph
- 1921: Lieut.-Col. Henry Bodvel Lewis Hughes, of Kinmel Park, St. George, Abergele
- 1922: William Buckley, of Hafod, Mold
- 1923: John Watson Hughes, of Pontryffydd, Trefnan
- 1924: Lieut.-Col. Watkin Randle Kynaston Mainwaring, of Hafod-y-Coed, St. Asaph
- 1925: Herbert Watkinson, of Brook Park, Northop
- 1926: William Charlton, of Plas Bellin, Northop
- 1927: Charles Read, of Northop Hall, Northop
- 1928: Edward Llewelyn Roger Lloyd-Mostyn, of Pentreffynnon, Holywell
- 1929: Rear-Admiral Rafe Grenville Rowley-Conwy, of Bodrhyddan, Rhuddlan
- 1930: Thomas Herbert Lewis, of Bryn Edwin, Flint
- 1931: Frank Mortimer, of Golden Grove, Llanasa, Holywell
- 1932: Sir Griffin Wyndham Edward Hanmer, 7th Baronet, of Bettisfield Park, Whitchurch, Salop
- 1933: Col. Thomas Freer-Ash, of Mumzone Bungalow, Sandhills, Rhyl
- 1934: Brigadier-General John Henry Lloyd, of Queensbridge, Ellesmere
- 1935: Frederic Alan Bates, of Gyrn Castle, Llanasa, Holywell
- 1936: James Platt, of Highfield Hall, Northop
- 1937: Henry Cecil Lloyd Howard, of Wigfair, St. Asaph
- 1938: John Fairbairne Wynne-Eyton, of Leeswood Hall, Mold
- 1939: Sir Geoffrey Summers of Cornist Hall, Flint
- 1940: Vivian Darby Wain, of Fron Hall, Mold, Flintshire
- 1941: Samuel Vickers, of Oakland's, Wepre Drive, Connahs Quay, near Chester
- 1942: Thomas Waterhouse of Highfield, Holywell
- 1943: Percy John Ashfielel, of Den Haag, Pendyffryn Road, Rhyl
- 1944: Richard Felix Summers, of Denna Hall, Burton Point, Wirral, Cheshire
- 1945: Robert Wynne Bankes, of Soughton Hall, Northop, Flintshire
- 1946: Arthur Dunnot Humberston Pennant, of Nantlys, St. Asaph
- 1947: William Joseph Hodson, of Buckley, near Chester
- 1948: Alexander Reith Gray, of Lower Soughton, Northop
- 1949: Major Philip Ralph Davies-Cooke, of Gwysaney, Mold.
- 1950: Ralph Eldon Owen, of Cae Gwyn, Tremeirchion, Flintshire
- 1951: Charles Andrew Gladstone of Hawarden Castle, Hawarden, Flintshire.
- 1952: John Heron Storey, of Llanerch Y Mor House, Holywell
- 1953: Robert Stewart Kelly, of Ty Coch, Mynydd Isa, Mold
- 1954: Lieut.-Colonel William Franklin-Beavan, of Halkyn Castle, near Holywell
- 1955: Alfred Hugh Rutt, of Basingwerk Greenfield, Holywell
- 1956: Thomas Edward Daniel Hibbert, of "West Court", Bistre Avenue, Buckley
- 1957: Dr Roger Bellis Edwards, Pendre Cottage, Mold.
- 1958: James Arnold Johnson of Plas Morfa, Greenfield, Holywell
- 1959: John Chadwick Mather of Plas-yn-Llan, Nannerch.
- 1960: Lieut.-Colonel Robert Michael FitzHugh of The Brow, Overton.
- 1961: Theodore Brice Beaton of Bryn yr Haul, Mold.
- 1962: Major Alastair Stewart Durward Graesser, of "Glasfryn", Gresfordi, near Wrexham, Denbighshire
- 1963: Lieut.-Colonel Hugh Maurice Carstairs Jones-Mortimer of Hartsheath, Mold.
- 1964: Matthew Robin Mortimer Steele-Mortimer of Golden Grove, Llanasa.
- 1965: Lieut.-Colonel (Brevet Colonel) Seymour Valentine Misa, of Althrey Woodhouse, Bangor-on-Dee.
- 1966: Brigadier John Howard Stafford, of Plas Isaf, Mold.
- 1967: Anthony Brydges Stobart of The Tyddyn, Mold.
- 1968: David Alexander Kerr Wilson of Bryn Edwin Hall, Flint Mountain.
- 1969: Sir Geoffrey Voltelin Bates, 5th Baronet, M.C., of Gyrn Castle, Llanasa, Holywell.
- 1970: Colonel James Ellis Evans, of Trafford Mount, 41 Gronant Road, Prestatyn.
- 1971: Major Basil Hugh Philipse Heaton, of Rhual, Mold.
- 1972: Stephen Alexander Reith Gray, of Lower Soughton, Northop, Mold.
- 1973: Reginald Townsend Smith, of Craxton, Gronant Road, Prestatyn.
- 1974 onwards – See High Sheriff of Clwyd
