= Edward Lloyd-Mostyn, 2nd Baron Mostyn =

British politician and peer

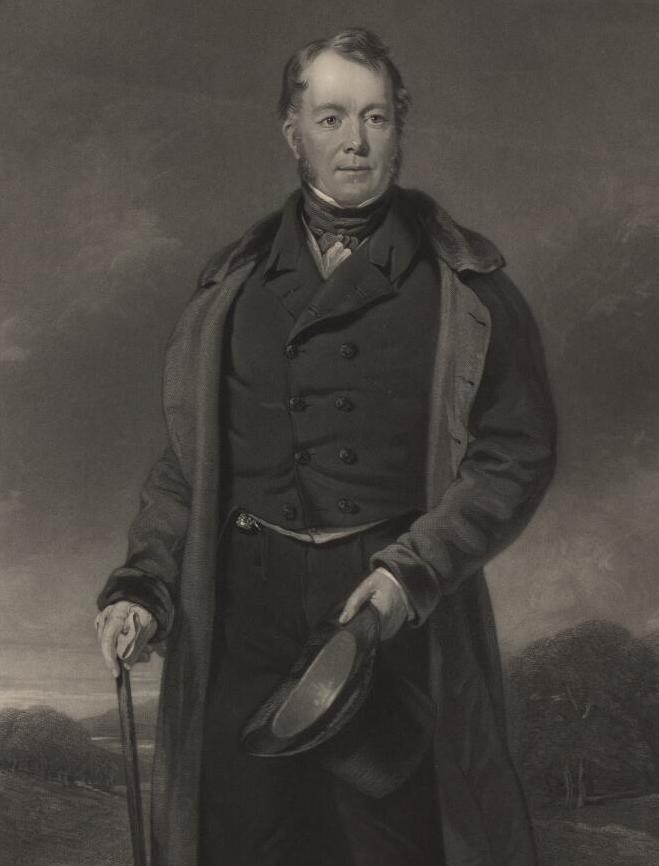
Edward Mostyn Lloyd-Mostyn

Edward Mostyn Lloyd-Mostyn, 2nd Baron Mostyn (13 January 1795 – 17 March 1884), was a British peer and Member of Parliament (MP).

== Biography ==
Mostyn was the son of Edward Lloyd, 1st Baron Mostyn. Born Edward Mostyn Lloyd, he assumed by royal licence the additional surname of Mostyn in 1831, in accordance with the will of his mother's brother Sir Thomas Mostyn, last of the Mostyn baronets of Mostyn Hall.

In 1831 he was elected to the House of Commons for Flintshire, a seat he held from 1831 to 1837, from 1841 to 1842 and from 1847 to 1850. He also represented Lichfield from 1846 to 1847. In 1854 he succeeded his father in the barony and entered the House of Lords. In 1839 he served as High Sheriff of Merionethshire, in 1840 as High Sheriff of Caernarvonshire and between 1840 and 1884 as Lord Lieutenant of Merionethshire.

Lord Mostyn married Lady Harriet-Margaret Scott on 20 June 1827. Lady Mostyn was the eldest daughter of the Earl of Clonmell. Lord Mostyn died in March 1884, aged 89, and was succeeded in his titles by his grandson Llewellyn, his eldest son the Hon. Thomas Edward Lloyd-Mostyn having predeceased him.

== Issue ==
1. Hon. Harriet Margaret

2. Thomas Edward b. 23 January 1830

3. Roger b. 1 May 1831

== Arms ==
Coat of arms of Edward Lloyd-Mostyn, 2nd Baron Mostyn
Crest "1st on a mount Vert a lion rampant Or 2nd a Saracen's head as in the arms 3rd a stag trippant Proper attired Or charged on the shoulder with an escutcheon of the second thereon a chevron of the first between three men's heads in profile couped at the neck also Proper." Escutcheon "Quarterly 1st & 4th per bend sinister Ermine and Ermines a lion rampant Or (Mostyn) 2nd & 3rd Gules a Saracen's head afftrontee erased at the neck Proper, wreathed about the temples Argent and Sable" (Lloyd). Supporters "Dexter a stag Proper attired Or charged on the shoulder with an escutcheon Gules thereon a chevron Argent between three men's heads couped in profile Proper sinister a lion Or charged on the shoulder with an escutcheon Argent thereon a cross engrailed and fleurettee Sable between three Cornish choughs Proper." Motto Auxilium Meum A Domino (My Help Is From The Lord)

Parliament of the United Kingdom
Preceded by Sir Thomas Mostyn, Bt	Member of Parliament for Flintshire; 1831–1837	Succeeded by Sir Stephen Glynne, Bt
Preceded by Sir Stephen Glynne, Bt	Member of Parliament for Flintshire; 1841–1842	Succeeded by Sir Stephen Glynne, Bt
Preceded by Lord Alfred Paget; Lord Leveson	Member of Parliament for Lichfield; 1846–1847; With: Lord Alfred Paget	Succeeded by Lord Alfred Paget; Viscount Anson
Preceded by Sir Stephen Glynne, Bt	Member of Parliament for Flintshire; 1847–1854	Succeeded by Thomas Edward Lloyd-Mostyn
Honorary titles
Preceded by John Manners Kerr	High Sheriff of Merionethshire; 1839	Succeeded by George Price Lloyd
Preceded by Sir Watkin Williams-Wynn, Bt	Lord Lieutenant of Merionethshire; 1840–1884	Succeeded by Robert Davies Pryce
Preceded by The Marquess of Anglesey	Vice-Admiral of North Wales and Carmarthenshire; 1854–1884	Vacant
Peerage of the United Kingdom
Preceded by Edward Pryce Lloyd	Baron Mostyn; 1854–1884	Succeeded by Llewellyn Nevill Vaughan; Lloyd-Mostyn
