= Custos Rotulorum of Flintshire =

This is a list of people who have served as Custos Rotulorum of Flintshire.

- Sir Nicholas Hare bef. 1544–1557
- John Griffith bef. 1558 – aft. 1579
- Robert Dudley, 1st Earl of Leicester bef. 1584–1588
- Sir Thomas Egerton 1588 – aft. 1594
- Thomas Ravenscroft 1596 – aft. 1636
- Thomas Ravenscroft 1640–1642
- Sir Thomas Hanmer, 2nd Baronet 1642–1646, 1660–1678
- Sir Roger Mostyn, 1st Baronet 1678–1689
- Roger Whitley 1689
- Thomas Whitley 1689–1691
- Sir John Trevor 1691–1714
- Sir Roger Mostyn, 3rd Baronet 1714–1717
- Robert Davies 1717–1727
- Sir Roger Mostyn, 3rd Baronet 1727–1739
- vacant
- Thomas Archer, 1st Baron Archer 1750–1753
- Other Windsor, 4th Earl of Plymouth 1753–1771
- Sir Roger Mostyn, 5th Baronet 1772–1796
- Lloyd Kenyon, 1st Baron Kenyon 1796–1802
- Robert Grosvenor, 1st Marquess of Westminster 1802–1845

For later custodes rotulorum, see Lord Lieutenant of Flintshire.
