= John Trevor (speaker) =

Welsh lawyer and politician (died 1717)

Sir John Trevor
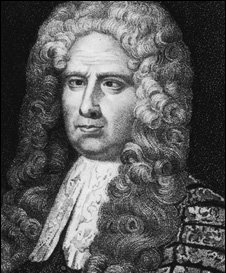

Speaker of the House of Commons
- In office 1689–1695
- Monarchs: William III and Mary II
- Preceded by: Henry Powle
- Succeeded by: Paul Foley
- In office 1685–1687
- Monarch: James II
- Preceded by: Sir William Williams
- Succeeded by: Henry Powle

Personal details
- Born: c. 1637
- Died: 20 May 1717
- Education: Ruthin School
- Occupation: Politician and lawyer

Sir John Trevor (c. 1637 – 20 May 1717) was a Welsh lawyer and politician. He was Speaker of the English House of Commons from 1685 to 1687 (the Loyal Parliament) and from 1689 to 1695. Trevor also served as Master of the Rolls from 1685 to 1689 and from 1693 to 1717. His second term as Speaker came to an end due to a bribery allegation; he was expelled from the House of Commons shortly thereafter.

== Early life ==
John Trevor was born around 1637 or 1638, the exact date of his birth being unrecorded. His father, also called John Trevor, was the son of Sir Edward Trevor; his mother was Margaret Jeffreys, daughter of John Jeffreys and aunt of the celebrated judge. The family lived at Brynkinalt in the parish of Chirk in the Welsh county of Denbighshire.

Trevor was educated at Ruthin School, and he started his career as a clerk for his relative Arthur Trevor. From there he worked his way up with the help of the patronage of another relative George Jeffreys until he was appointed a king's counsel by Charles II.

== Political and judicial appointments ==
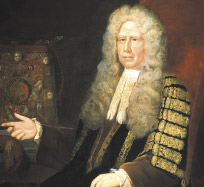
Sir John Trevor, c. 1700

In 1685 he was appointed to the high offices of Master of the Rolls and Speaker of the House of Commons by James II. Being a Tory and a partisan of James II, the accession of William III saw Trevor deprived of his office. In 1690, however, he once again returned to parliament as Speaker. From 1693, he also once again held the judicial office of Master of the Rolls. Between 1692 and 1695, he represented Newry in the Irish House of Commons.

As Speaker, he was memorable for being severely cross-eyed—the affliction was so confusing to members of the House that they were frequently uncertain as to which of them had "caught the Speaker's eye", and would try to speak out of turn.

== Scandal ==
He was accused of taking bribes from the East India Company and the City of London, and was investigated by a committee chaired by the Commissioner of Accounts, Paul Foley MP. On 7 March 1695, he was found guilty of accepting a bribe of 1,000 guineas from the City of London Corporation to aid the passage of a bill (for the relief of orphans) through the house. This was judged to be a "high crime and misdemeanour". Trevor resigned from the Speakership on 14 March, and was expelled from the House of Commons on 16 March. He was not asked to refund the bribe and retained his judicial position until his death at the age of 79 or 80 on 20 May 1717.

== Family ==
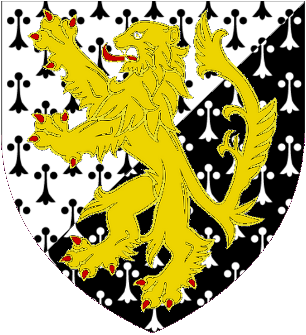
Shield of arms: Per bend sinister Ermine and Ermines a lion rampant Or.

Trevor married Jane Mostyn, the daughter of Sir Roger Mostyn. They are known to have had four children: Edward, Arthur, John and Anne. Trevor's wife predeceased him, dying in August 1704.

== Notes ==
Parliament of England
Preceded by Sir John Maynard; Sir William Bastard	Member of Parliament for Bere Alston; 1679–1681; With: Sir William Bastard	Succeeded by Sir Duncombe Colchester; John Elwill
Preceded by Sir Thomas Myddelton	Member of Parliament for Denbighshire; 1681–1685	Succeeded by Sir Richard Myddelton
Preceded by Sir John Salusbury	Member of Parliament for Denbigh Boroughs; 1685–1689	Succeeded by Edward Brereton
Preceded by Hon. Fitton Gerard; Sir Robert Holmes	Member of Parliament for Yarmouth; 1690–1695; With: Charles Duncombe	Succeeded by Henry Holmes; Charles Duncombe
Parliament of Ireland
Unknown	Member of Parliament for Newry; 1692–1695; With: Frederick Porter	Succeeded by Frederick Porter; Robert Echlin
Political offices
Preceded by Sir William Williams	Speaker of the House of Commons; 1685–1687	Succeeded by Henry Powle
Preceded by Henry Powle	Speaker of the House of Commons; 1689–1695	Succeeded by Paul Foley
Legal offices
Preceded by Sir John Churchill	Master of the Rolls; 1685–1689	Succeeded by Henry Powle
Preceded by Sir Henry Powle	Master of the Rolls; 1693–1717	Succeeded by Sir Joseph Jekyll
Honorary titles
Preceded by Thomas Whitley	Custos Rotulorum of Flintshire; 1691–1714	Succeeded by Sir Roger Mostyn, 3rd Baronet
