= Sir Thomas Mostyn, 4th Baronet =

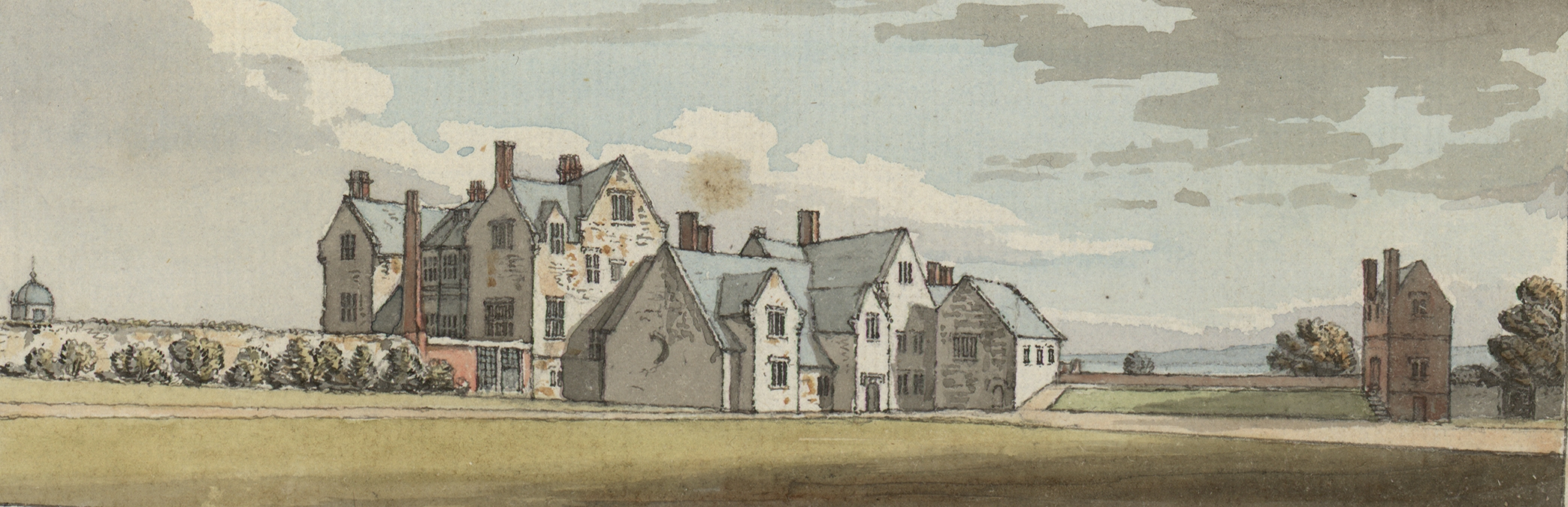
Plas Mostyn, also known as Mostyn Hall, with extensions

Sir Thomas Mostyn, 4th Baronet (26 April 1704 – 1758), of Mostyn, Flintshire, was a British landowner and Tory politician who sat in the House of Commons between 1734 and 1758.

== Early life ==
Mostyn was the eldest son of Sir Roger Mostyn, 3rd Baronet, of Mostyn and Leighton, and his wife Essex Finch daughter of Daniel Finch, 2nd Earl of Nottingham. He was educated at Westminster School in 1716 and matriculated at Christ Church, Oxford on 13 October 1720, aged 16. He travelled extensively in Europe from October 1723 until May 1728. His main interest was literature and he collected books and manuscripts. He married Sarah Western, daughter. of Robert Western of St Peters Cornhill, London and Rivenhall Essex in about 1733.

== Career ==
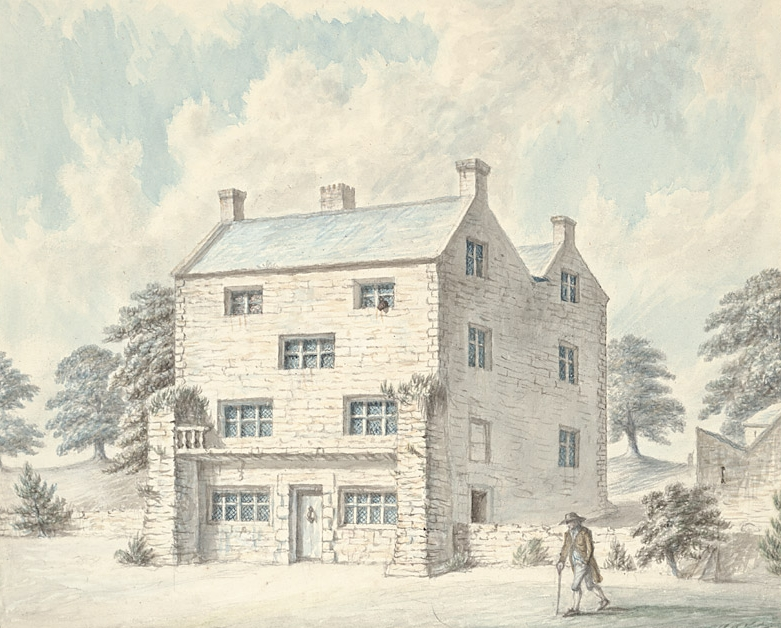
Plas Mostyn. The original seat of the Mostyn family, 1793

Mostyn was a Hanoverian Tory, and in 1727 forced the Jacobite sheriff of Flintshire to proclaim George II. He took a leading part in local Tory preparations for the 1734 British general election and was returned as Member of Parliament for Flintshire in succession to his father. He voted consistently against the Administration. He succeeded his father to the baronetcy on 8 May 1739. At the 1741 British general election he stood down by agreement, and declined the invitation to stand for Flint Boroughs after the heavy cost of the previous election there, which had cost him over £2,000. At the 1747 British general election, he was returned for Flintshire He was returned unopposed again for Flintshire at the 1754 British general election.

== Death and legacy ==
Mostyn died on 24 March 1758 leaving four sons and five daughters. His wife Sarah survived to 1783. He was succeeded in the baronetcy by his son Roger. His daughter Anne, became the second wife of Thomas Pennant of Downing Hall, the naturalist and traveller in 1777.

Parliament of Great Britain
Preceded by Sir Roger Mostyn	Member of Parliament for Flintshire; 1734–1741	Succeeded by Sir John Glynne
Preceded by Sir John Glynne	Member of Parliament for Flintshire; 1747–1758	Succeeded by Sir Roger Mostyn
Baronetage of England
Preceded by Roger Mostyn	Baronet (of Mostyn); 1739-1758	Succeeded by Roger Mostyn
