= Baron Mostyn =

Barony in the Peerage of the United Kingdom

Baron Mostyn, of Mostyn in the County of Flint, is a title in the Peerage of the United Kingdom.

== History ==
The title was created in 1831 for Sir Edward Lloyd, 2nd Baronet, who had earlier represented Flint Boroughs and Beaumaris in the House of Commons. His son, the second Baron, sat as a Member of Parliament for Flintshire and Lichfield and served as Lord Lieutenant of Merionethshire.

The second baron had assumed the additional surname of Mostyn by royal licence in 1831, on the death of his mother's brother, the last of the Mostyn baronets. His eldest son and heir the Hon. Thomas Lloyd-Mostyn, who also represented Flintshire in Parliament, predeceased his father. Lord Mostyn was therefore succeeded by his grandson, the third Baron (the son of Thomas Lloyd-Mostyn). The 6th Baron died on 22 March 2011 and was succeeded by his only son.

The Baronetcy of Pengwerra in the County of Flint, was created in the Baronetage of Great Britain in 1778 for Edward Lloyd, with remainder to his nephews. He was succeeded according to the special remainder by his eldest nephew, the aforementioned second Baronet, who was elevated to the peerage in 1831.

The family seat is Mostyn Hall, near Mostyn.

== Lloyd Baronets, of Pengwerra (1778) ==
- Sir Edward Pryce Lloyd, 1st Baronet (c. 1710–1795)
- Sir Edward Pryce Lloyd, 2nd Baronet (1768–1854) (created Baron Mostyn in 1831)

== Barons Mostyn (1831) ==
- Edward Pryce Lloyd, 1st Baron Mostyn (1768–1854)
- Edward Mostyn Lloyd-Mostyn, 2nd Baron Mostyn (1795–1884)
  - Hon. Thomas Edward Lloyd-Mostyn (1830–1861)
- Llewelyn Nevill Vaughan Lloyd-Mostyn, 3rd Baron Mostyn (1856–1929)
- Edward Llewellyn Roger Lloyd-Mostyn, 4th Baron Mostyn (1885–1965)
- Roger Edward Lloyd Lloyd-Mostyn, 5th Baron Mostyn (1920–2000)
- Llewellyn Roger Lloyd Lloyd-Mostyn, 6th Baron Mostyn (1948–2011)
- Gregory Philip Roger Lloyd-Mostyn, 7th Baron Mostyn (b. 1984)

The heir presumptive is the present holder's third cousin twice removed, Roger Hugh Lloyd-Mostyn (born 1941), great-great-grandson of the 2nd Baron.
The heir presumptive's heir is his eldest son, Christopher Edward Lloyd-Mostyn (b. 1968)
The heir presumptive's heir's heir is his son Alexander James Lloyd-Mostyn (b. 2000)

== Arms ==
Coat of arms of Baron Mostyn
Crest 1st on a mount Vert a lion rampant Or 2nd a Saracen's head as in the arms 3rd a stag trippant Proper attired Or charged on the shoulder with an escutcheon of the second thereon a chevron of the first between three men's heads in profile couped at the neck also Proper. Escutcheon Quarterly 1st & 4th per bend sinister Ermine and Ermines a lion rampant Or (Mostyn) 2nd & 3rd Gules a Saracen's head afftrontee erased at the neck Proper, wreathed about the temples Argent and Sable (Lloyd). Supporters Dexter a stag Proper attired Or charged on the shoulder with an escutcheon Gules thereon a chevron Argent between three men's heads couped in profile Proper sinister a lion Or charged on the shoulder with an escutcheon Argent thereon a cross engrailed and fleurettee Sable between three Cornish choughs Proper. Motto Auxilium Meum A Domino (My Help Is From The Lord)

== See also ==
- Mostyn Baronets

== Notes ==
Baronetage of Great Britain
Preceded by Copley baronets	Lloyd baronets of Pengwerra; 29 August 1778	Succeeded by Cramer-Coghill baronets
