= Summers baronets =

Extinct baronetcy in the Baronetage of the United Kingdom

The Summers Baronetcy, of Shotton in the County of Flint, was a title in the Baronetage of the United Kingdom. It was created on 2 July 1952 for Geoffrey Summers. He was succeeded by his son, the second Baronet, who did not use the title. On his death in 1993 the baronetcy became extinct.

== Summers baronets, of Shotton (1952) ==
- Sir Geoffrey Summers, 1st Baronet (1891–1972)
- (Sir) (Felix) Roland Brattan Summers, 2nd Baronet (1918–1993)
