= John Lloyd (scholar) =

British naturalist and scholar

John Lloyd FRS (25 January 1750 – 24 April 1815) was a British naturalist.

He was the eldest son of Howel Lloyd of Hafodunos and Wigfair, was probably educated at Oxford University and then studied law at the Middle Temple, where he was called to the bar in 1781.

A man with a wide interest in the natural sciences including seismology and astronomy, he was elected a Fellow of the Royal Society in 1774.

He was the Member of Parliament (MP) for Flintshire from 1797 to 1799.

He died unmarried in 1815.

== Selected works ==
- "An Account of the Late Discovery of Native Gold in Ireland," Letter from John Lloyd, Esq. F.R.S. to Sir Joseph Banks, Bart. KB PRS. Philosophical Transactions of the Royal Society of London, Vol. 86 (1796), pp. 34–37.

Parliament of Great Britain
Preceded by Sir Thomas Mostyn, Bt	Member of Parliament for Flintshire; 1797 – 1799	Succeeded by Sir Thomas Mostyn, Bt
