= Hope Hall =

Country house in Flintshire, Wales

Coordinates: 53°07′08″N 3°01′27″W

Hope Hall, Hope, Flintshire, Wales was a country house, built in 1740 and demolished in 1960.

== The building ==
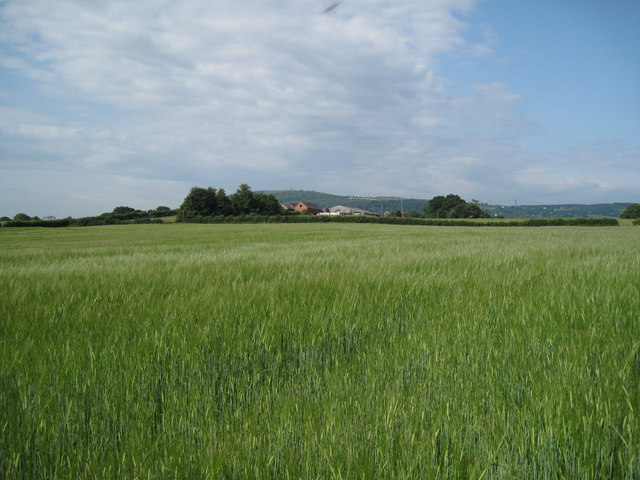
The Former Site of Hope Hall (Hope House Farm)

Hope Hall was built on the site of am old farm house and building. The Hall was described as being an imposing building, two and a half stories high, constructed of red coloured handmade brick building with stone features. There was a small brickyard at Hope Hall for the purpose of making bricks solely for the maintenance of the estate building. The bricks were made by machine and name stamped ' Hope Hall'. The precise dates that the brickyard were in operation is unknown, although on a map dated 1871 shows a shed and a small claypit at the Hall.

On 8 October 1867 a fire destroyed an outbuilding and its contents, valued at £150. On Sunday, 10 August 1878, the wife of the Reverend Robert Roberts was in the house when it was struck by lightning damaging a chimney pot. The hall was demolished in 1960.

== History ==
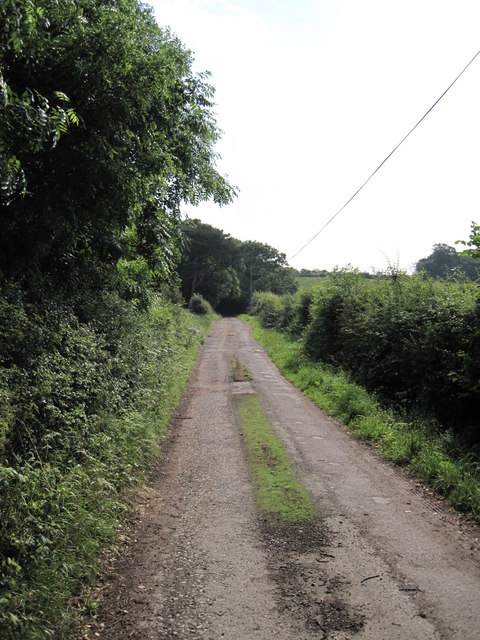
Hope Hall Drive

Differing accounts exist about the origins of Hope Hall. Written was that in 1740 a brick built house was constructed on the site of old farmhouse and buildings that were held by the Longueville family from the reign of King Henry VI (1422–61). It was built for Elizabeth Charlotte, the daughter of Sir Thomas Longueville of Esclusham Hall, Rhostyllyn. An alternative version is that the brick house replaced an older farm on the site in 1751. Sir George Wynne, due to family debts, sold their Broughton Hall estate, and to save money built the new hall. In 1791, a £30,000 debt led to them mortgaging the estate to the Brooke family.

In 1791, when the village of Hope was enclosed by the Hope, Lower Kinnerton, and Dodleston (Cheshire) Inclosure Act 1791 (31 Geo. 3. c. 69 Pr.), the Reverend J. Hope Wynne-Eyton possessed the lands of Hope Hall. In 1815, Hope Hall was the seat of Sir Richard Brooke, 6th Baronet of Norton Priory (1785-1865), the High Sheriff of Flintshire. In 1826, it was the seat of John Price the High Sheriff of Flintshire. In 1868, it was in the possession of Thomas Wynne-Eyton, as part of the Leeswood Estates. The Eytons of Hope Hall were descended from Kindick Efell, Lord of Esglwyseg, and Madog, Lord of Leeswood.

== Tenants ==
1861 John Lloyd, a farmer

1871 Joseph Dutton, a farmer

1881 John Greenwood, a farm bailiff

After 1891 until at least 1911 a farmer

== See also ==
- Wynne baronets
