= Sir Roger Mostyn, 5th Baronet =

Politician (1734–1796)

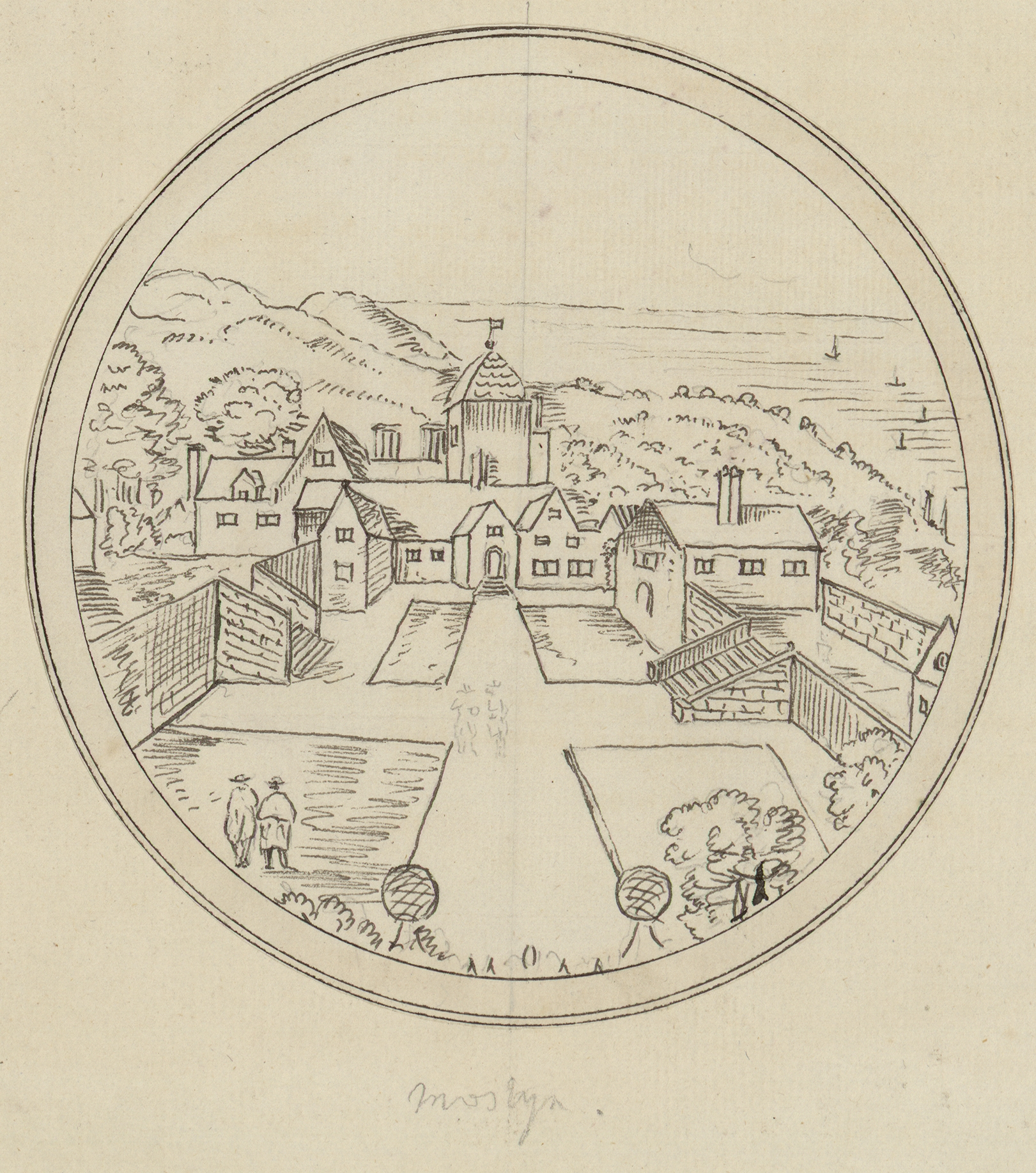
Sketch of Mostyn Hall, was extended over time

Sir Roger Mostyn, 5th Baronet (13 November 1734 – 26 July 1796) was a Welsh landowner and politician who sat in the House of Commons for 38 years from 1758 to 1796.

== Early life and inheritance ==
Mostyn was the son of Sir Thomas Mostyn, 4th Baronet of Mostyn Hall, Flintshire and his wife Sarah Western, daughter and co-heiress of Robert Western of London. His great-grandfather was Daniel Finch, 2nd Earl of Nottingham, son of the Lord Chancellor of England, Heneage Finch.

Mostyn was educated at Westminster School from 1745 to 1751 and matriculated at Christ Church, Oxford in 1751. On the death of his father on 24 March 1758 he succeeded to the baronetcy.

He married Margaret Wynn, daughter of Rev. Hugh Wynn, DD, prebendary of Salisbury on 19 May 1766. She was heiress of her father and two uncles Robert Wynne and Evan Lloyd Vaughan. He inherited a number of estates, including the seat at Mostyn, in both Wales and Cheshire. and £60,000 from his unmarried uncle, Savage Mostyn.

== Political career ==
Mostyn was returned unopposed as Member of Parliament for Flintshire at a by-election on 26 April 1758 replacing his late father. His family had the dominant electoral interest in Flintshire and he was returned unopposed at general elections in 1761, 1768, 1774, 1780, 1784, 1790 and 1796. Mostyn was a Whig whose voting record became a concern to his constituents, and in 1784 his brother-in-law, Thomas Pennant of Downing, threatened to create an opposition although nothing came of it.

Mostyn served as Lord Lieutenant of Flintshire from 1761 to his death and Custos Rotulorum of Flintshire from 1772 to his death. He was a Lieutenant-Colonel in the Flintshire Militia.

== Later life and legacy ==
Mostyn died on 26 July 1796, "much regretted and esteemed for his many public and private virtues". He and his wife Margaret had a son Thomas and 6 daughters. He was succeeded in the baronetcy and Parliamentary seat by Thomas, who died unmarried, causing the baronetcy to become extinct. Of his daughters, Charlotte married Sir Thomas Swymmer Mostyn-Champneys, 2nd Bt, Elizabeth married Sir Edward Pryce Lloyd, 2nd Bt and Anna-Maria married Sir Robert Williames Vaughan, 2nd Bt, while Catherine, Essex and Maria Bridget were unmarried.

Parliament of Great Britain
Preceded by Sir Thomas Mostyn, Bt.	Member of Parliament for Flintshire; 1758–1796	Succeeded by Sir Thomas Mostyn, Bt.
Baronetage of England
Preceded by Sir Thomas Mostyn	Baronet (of Mostyn); 1758–1796	Succeeded by Sir Thomas Mostyn
