= Watkin Williams (Flint MP) =

Welsh politician

Watkin Williams (1742? – 30 November 1808), of Penbedw, near Flint, Denbighshire and Erbistock, Flintshire, was a Welsh politician and administrator.

== Life ==
Williams was the son of Richard Williams, MP and Annabella Lloyd from Drenewydd. He was educated at Brasenose College, Oxford.

== Career ==
Williams was the Member of Parliament for Montgomeryshire 9 June 1772 – 1774 and Flint Boroughs 26 June 1777 – 1806.

He was Lord Lieutenant of Merionethshire from August 1789 to June 1793, Lord Lieutenant of Denbighshire from 1792 to 1793 and Constable of Flint Castle from March 1799 to his death. He was also a Major in the Salop militia (1766–96) and the Flintshire fusiliers (1803).

He died in 1808. He had married Elizabeth Stapleton, the daughter of Colonel James Russell Stapleton from Bodrhyddan, Flintshire but had no children.

Parliament of Great Britain
Preceded by Edward Kynaston	Member of Parliament for Montgomeryshire; 1772–1774	Succeeded by William Mostyn Owen
Parliament of the United Kingdom
Preceded by Sir John Glynne, Bt	Member of Parliament for Flint Boroughs; 1777–1806	Succeeded by Sir Edward Pryce Lloyd, Bt
