= Geoffrey Summers =

British Baronet

Sir Geoffrey Summers, 1st Baronet, CBE, DL, JP, CStJ (2 September 1891 – 17 January 1972) was a British businessman.

Educated at Uppingham and Gonville and Caius College, Cambridge, Summers served in the First World War with the Royal Engineers (Territorial Force). He joined John Summers & Sons Ltd, steel manufacturers of Shotton, in 1913, and became a director in 1921.

He was High Sheriff of Flintshire for 1939. In 1952 he was created a baronet, of Shotton in the County of Flint.

Baronetage of the United Kingdom
New creation	Baronet (of Shotton); 1952–1972	Succeeded by Roland Summers
