= Sir John Glynne, 6th Baronet =

Welsh landowner and MP

Sir John Glynne, 6th Baronet (1713 – 1 July 1777) was a Welsh politician and landowner.

Glynne was the third son of Sir Stephen Glynne, 3rd Baronet, and succeeded to the baronetcy after the successive deaths of his father and elder brothers in 1729 and 1730. In November of the latter year, he matriculated from The Queen's College, Oxford.

Sir John stood as Member of Parliament for Flint in 1734, but was defeated after spending £35,000 on the election. However, in 1741, he was elected MP for Flintshire, which he represented until 1747.

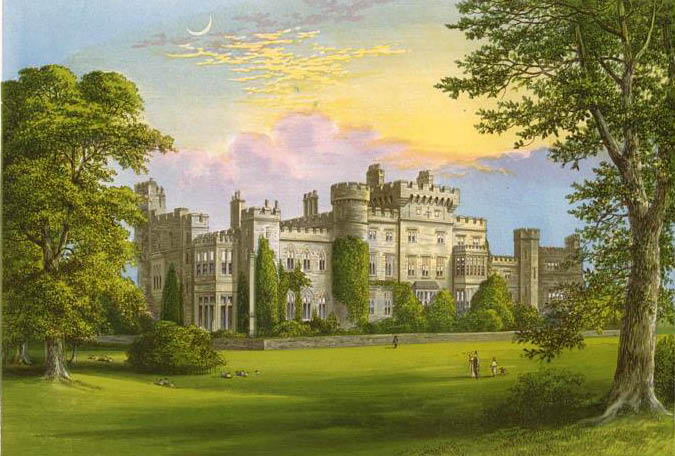
Hawarden Castle

In 1751, Glynne was High Sheriff of Flintshire, and in 1752, built Hawarden Castle on his estate. He was returned to Parliament again for Flint in 1753, and represented that constituency for the rest of his life. He was made a D.C.L. by Oxford in 1763.

In 1731, he married the heiress Honora Conway, by which match he almost doubled his estates at Hawarden. They had thirteen children:

- a son, died young
- John Conway Glynne (died 7 May 1773), m. S. Crewe
- Honora Glynne, died unmarried
- Sophia Glynne, married John Yorke of Bewerley, without surviving issue
- Penelope Glynne, married Sir William Earle Welby, 1st Baronet
- Catherine Glynne, died unmarried
- Rev. Sir Stephen Glynne, 7th Baronet (1744–1780)
- William Glynne
- Anne Glynne
- Frances Glynne, married Rev. Randolph Crewe
- Francis Glynne
- Lucy Glynne, married James Gordon
- Mary Glynne, married Simon Gordon

His wife Honora died in 1769, and Glynne remarried on 27 March 1772 to Augusta Beaumont, by whom he had no children. He died suddenly in 1777 and was succeeded by his son, Rev. Stephen Glynne, his elder son John Conway Glynne having died in 1773.

Parliament of Great Britain
Preceded by Sir Thomas Mostyn, Bt	Member of Parliament for Flintshire; 1741–1747	Succeeded by Sir Thomas Mostyn, Bt
Preceded by Kyffin Williams	Member of Parliament for Flint; 1753–1777	Succeeded by Watkin Williams
Baronetage of England
Preceded by William Glynne	Baronet (of Bicester, Oxfordshire); 1730–1777	Succeeded by Stephen Glynne
