= Roger Mostyn (priest) =

Roger Mostyn (1720 - 11 April 1775) was a Canon of Windsor from 1774 to 1775.

== Family ==
He was the son of Sir Roger Mostyn, 3rd Baronet and Lady Essex Finch, the daughter of Daniel Finch, 2nd Earl of Nottingham. His brothers included the naval officer Savage Mostyn and the colonial administrator John Mostyn; one of his sisters became Duchess of Roxburghe.

== Career ==
He was educated at Westminster School and Christ's College, Cambridge and graduated BA in 1743, and MA in 1745.

He was appointed:

- Rector of Eastling, Kent 1746 - 1752
- Rector of Christleton, Cheshire 1752 - 1774
- Prebendary of Chester 1760 - 1775

He was appointed to the twelfth stall in St George's Chapel, Windsor Castle in 1774, and held the stall until 1775.
