= Sir Roger Mostyn, 3rd Baronet =

Welsh Tory politician

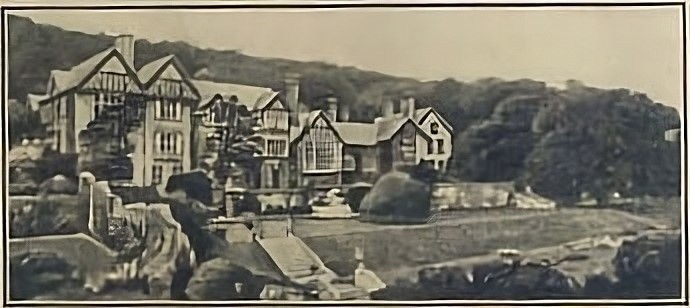
Gloddaeth Hall, 1935

Sir Roger Mostyn, 3rd Baronet (31 July 1673 – 5 May 1739), of Mostyn Hall, Holywell, Flintshire, was a Welsh Tory politician who sat in the English and British House of Commons for 25 years from 1701 to 1735.

== Early life ==
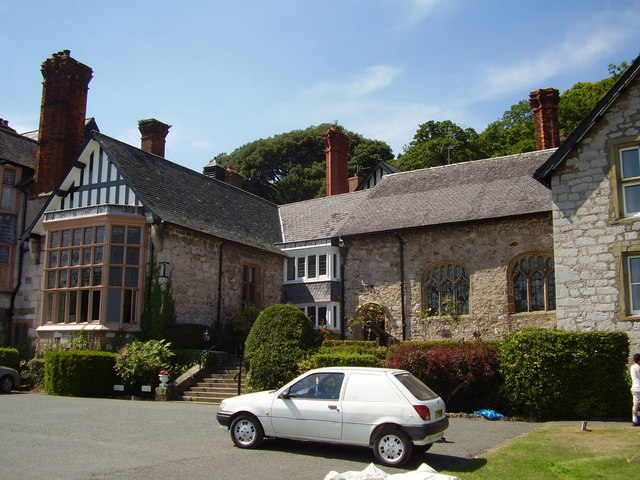
Gloddaeth Hall, Carnarvonshire (now Conwy), seat of the Mostyn family

Mostyn was born on 31 July 1673, in Flintshire, north Wales. He was the eldest son of Sir Thomas Mostyn, 2nd Baronet, of Mostyn, and his wife Bridget Savage, daughter and heiress of Darcy Savage of Leighton, Cheshire. He matriculated at Jesus College, Oxford on 10 February 1690, aged 15.

On the death of his father in 1692, he inherited the Mostyn baronetcy and estates. Although the estates were extensive and with a good income, his extravagance and love of horse racing led him into financial difficulties and he needed to make a good marriage. He married Lady Essex Finch, the daughter of Daniel Finch, 2nd Earl of Nottingham (with £7,000) on 20 July 1703.

== Career ==
Mostyn was appointed Sheriff of Caernarvonshire for 1701. He was a Tory and a supported his father in law Daniel Finch, 2nd Earl of Nottingham before and after his marriage. At the second general election of 1701 he stood for Parliament at two seats. He was defeated in a contest at Cheshire, but was returned unopposed as Member of Parliament (MP) for Flintshire. In August 1702, he was returned unopposed for Flint and also elected MP for Cheshire, which he chose to represent. He was appointed Constable of Flint Castle in 1702.

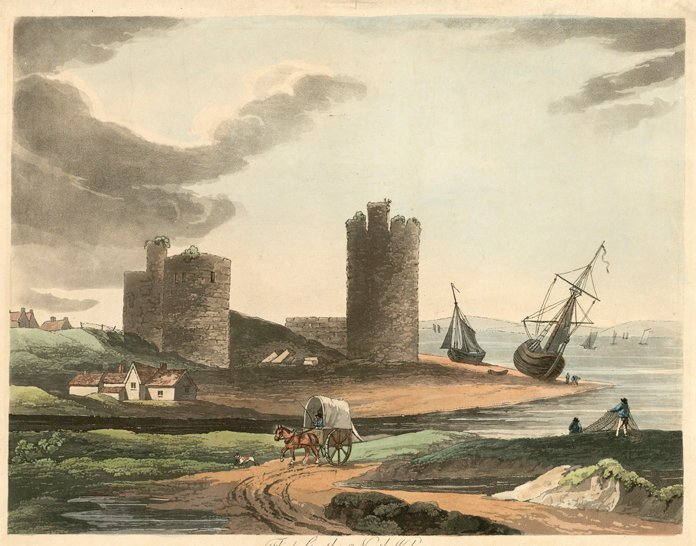
Flint Castle, North Wales, where Mostyn was appointed its Constable

He voted for tacking on the Occasional Conformity Bill to the Land-tax Bill in 1705 and this may have led to the loss of his seat and office of Constable. At the 1705 general election he was defeated in the poll at Cheshire but could fall back on the seat at Flint Boroughs where he was returned unopposed. He was returned unopposed for Flintshire in 1708 and 1710 and in 1711, he was appointed paymaster of the marines. He voted against the articles of commerce in 1713. At the 1713 general election, he was returned at Flint Boroughs. He was one of the four tellers of the exchequer from 30 December 1714 until 22 June 1716. He was also Custos Rotulorum of Flintshire from 1714 to 1717.

Mostyn was appointed Constable of Flint Castle again in 1715 and held the post until he passed it on to his son in 1728. At the 1715 general election, he was returned unopposed for Flintshire. He voted against the Peerage Bill in 1719. He was returned unopposed again for Flintshire in 1722 and 1727. In 1727, he was re-appointed Custos Rotulorum of Flintshire and retained the post until his death in 1739. He voted against Walpole's Excise Bill in 1733, and having opposed the Septennial Bill, supported the motion for its repeal in 1734.

He retired from Parliament at the 1734 general election. In consideration of his services and the expenses he incurred as paymaster of the marines, he was allowed a sum of £300 for eight years. There is also among the 'Treasury Papers' a dormant warrant in favour of Mostyn as controller of the fines for the counties of Chester, Flint, and Carnarvon, dated 31 July 1704.

== Death and legacy ==
Mostyn died on 5 May 1739, at his seat in Carnarvonshire and was buried at Llanrhos, Caernarvonshire. By his wife, who died of smallpox on 23 May 1721, he had six sons and six daughters. He was succeeded by his eldest son, Thomas, with the death of whose grandson Thomas in 1831 the baronetcy became extinct. Three of his other sons were unmarried: Roger was a Canon of Windsor, Savage Mostyn was a vice-admiral in the Royal Navy, and John Mostyn was an officer in the British Army and a Member of Parliament. His daughter Essex Mostyn (died 7 December 1764) married Robert Ker, second Duke of Roxburghe, and had issue.

== Sources ==
- Norgate, G. Le G.; Clayton, M. E. (May 2007). "Mostyn, Sir Roger, third baronet (1673–1739)". Oxford Dictionary of National Biography. Oxford University Press.

Parliament of England
Preceded by Sir John Conway	Member of Parliament for Flintshire; 1701–1702	Succeeded by Sir Thomas Hanmer
Preceded by Sir John Conway	Member of Parliament for Flint Boroughs; 1702	Succeeded by Thomas Mostyn
Preceded by Sir Robert Cotton; Sir John Mainwaring	Member of Parliament for Cheshire with Sir George Warburton; 1702–1705	Succeeded by Langham Booth; John Offley-Crewe
Preceded by Thomas Mostyn	Member of Parliament for Flint Boroughs; 1705–1707	Succeeded by Parliament of Great Britain
Parliament of Great Britain
Preceded by Parliament of England	Member of Parliament for Flint Boroughs; 1707–1708	Succeeded by Sir John Conway
Preceded by Sir John Conway	Member of Parliament for Flintshire; 1708–1713	Succeeded by Sir John Conway
Preceded by Sir John Conway	Member of Parliament for Flint Boroughs; 1713–1715	Succeeded by Sir John Conway
Preceded by Sir John Conway	Member of Parliament for Flintshire; 1715–1735	Succeeded by Sir Thomas Mostyn
Political offices
Preceded by Viscount Dupplin	Teller of the Exchequer; 1715–1716	Succeeded by Richard Hampden
Honorary titles
Preceded by Sir John Trevor	Custos Rotulorum of Flintshire; 1714–1717	Succeeded by Robert Davies
Preceded by Robert Davies	Custos Rotulorum of Flintshire; 1727–1739	Vacant Title next held by The Lord Archer
Baronetage of England
Preceded by Thomas Mostyn	Baronet (of Mostyn); 1692–1739	Succeeded by Thomas Mostyn
