= Sir Pyers Charles Mostyn, 10th Baronet =

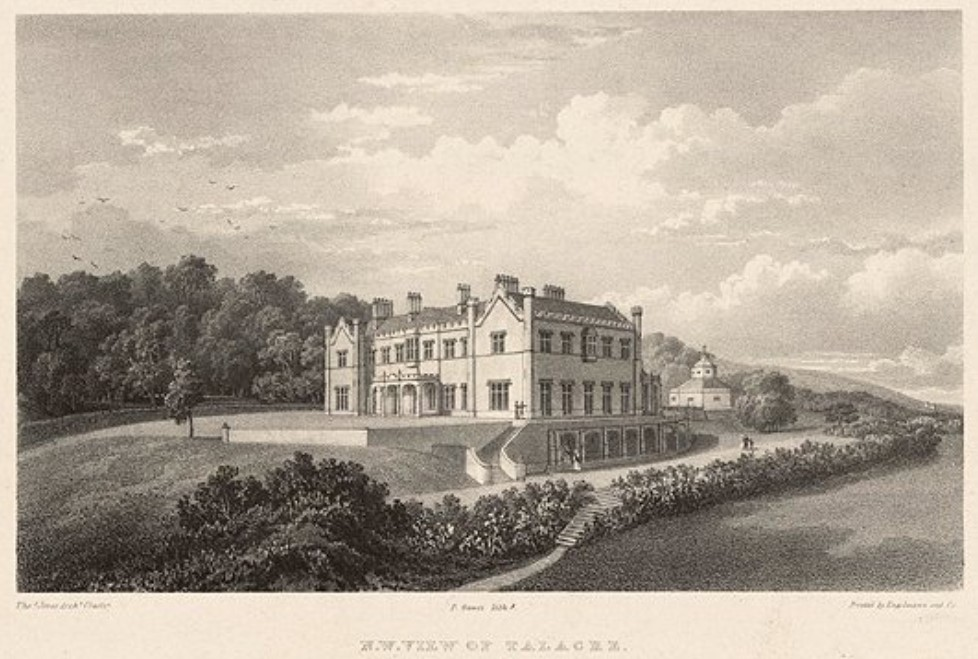
Talacre Hall, Flintshire, North West view, seat of Mostyn

Sir Pyers Charles Mostyn, 10th Baronet (1895 – 16 January 1917) was an English baronet.

He was born in 1895, the fourth child and eldest son of Sir Pyers William Mostyn, 9th Baronet, of the Mostyn baronets. On his own death the title passed to his cousin, Sir Pyers George Joseph Mostyn, 11th Baronet. His death at a young age forced the sale of the family estate of Talacre.

Baronetage of England
Preceded by Pyers Mostyn	Baronet (of Talacre); 1912–1917	Succeeded by Pyers Mostyn
