= Sir Thomas Mostyn, 6th Baronet =

Welsh MP

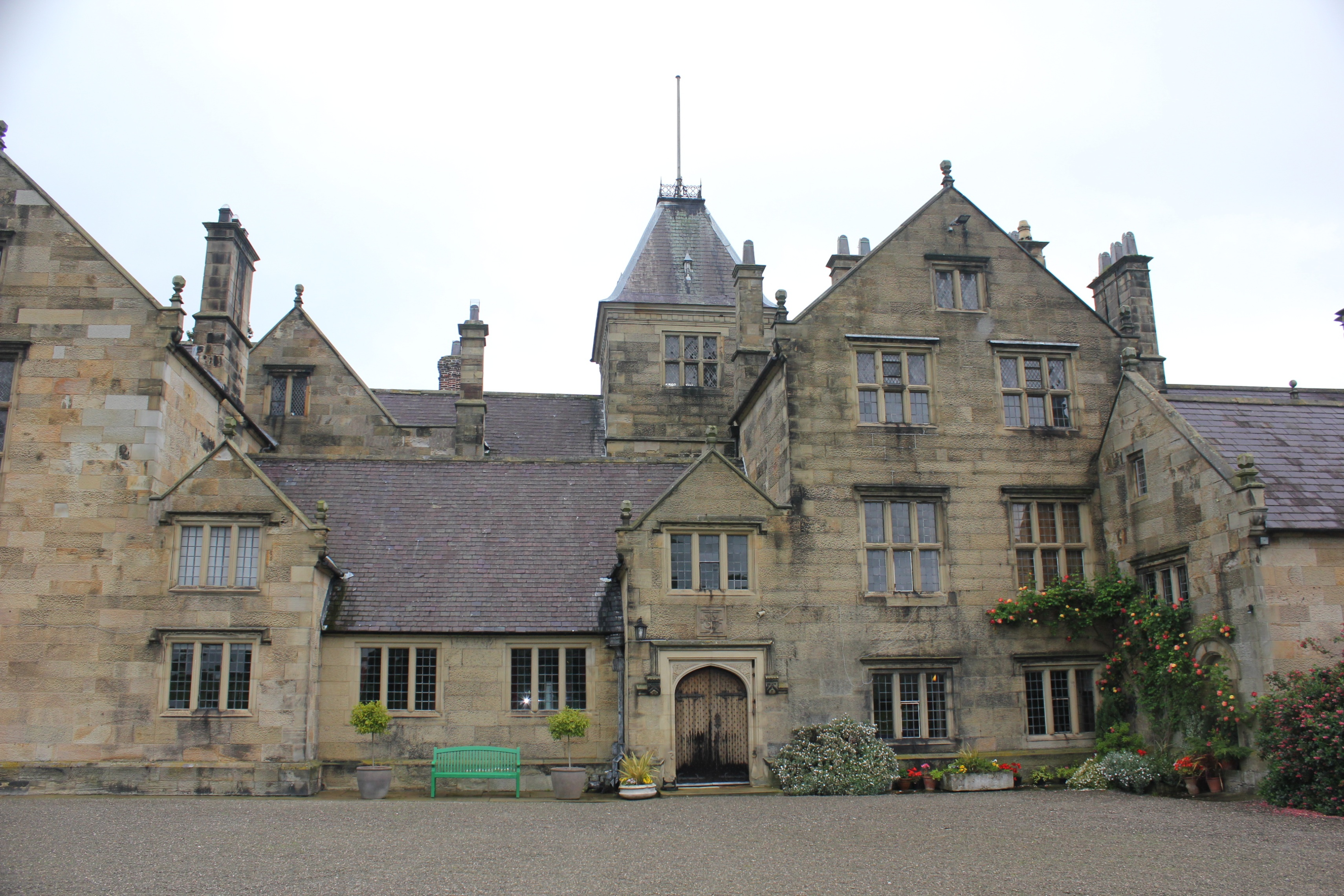
Mostyn Hall, Flintshire - seat of the Mostyn family

Sir Thomas Mostyn, 6th Baronet (20 October 1776 – 17 April 1831) of Mostyn Hall, Flintshire and Gloddaeth Hall, Caernarvonshire, was a Welsh Member of Parliament.

He was the only son of Sir Roger Mostyn, 5th Baronet and educated at Westminster School and Christ Church, Oxford. He succeeded his father to the baronetcy in 1796.

He was MP for Flintshire from 1796 to 1797 and again from 1799 to 1831. He was appointed High Sheriff of Caernarvonshire for 1798–99 and High Sheriff of Merionethshire for 1799–1800.

He died unmarried in 1831 and the baronetcy became extinct. His main estates passed to his sister Elizabeth and her husband, Sir Edward Pryce Lloyd, who was created Baron Mostyn later that year. The Baron's son adopted the additional name of Mostyn.

Parliament of Great Britain
Preceded by Sir Roger Mostyn, 5th Baronet	Member of Parliament for Flintshire; 1796–1797	Succeeded by John Lloyd
Preceded by John Lloyd	Member of Parliament for Flintshire; 1799–1800	Succeeded by Parliament of the United Kingdom
Parliament of the United Kingdom
Preceded by Parliament of Great Britain	Member of Parliament for Flintshire; 1801–1830	Succeeded by Edward Lloyd-Mostyn
Baronetage of England
Preceded by Roger Mostyn	Baronet (of Mostyn); 1796–1831	Extinct
