= Edward Lloyd, 1st Baron Mostyn =

British politician

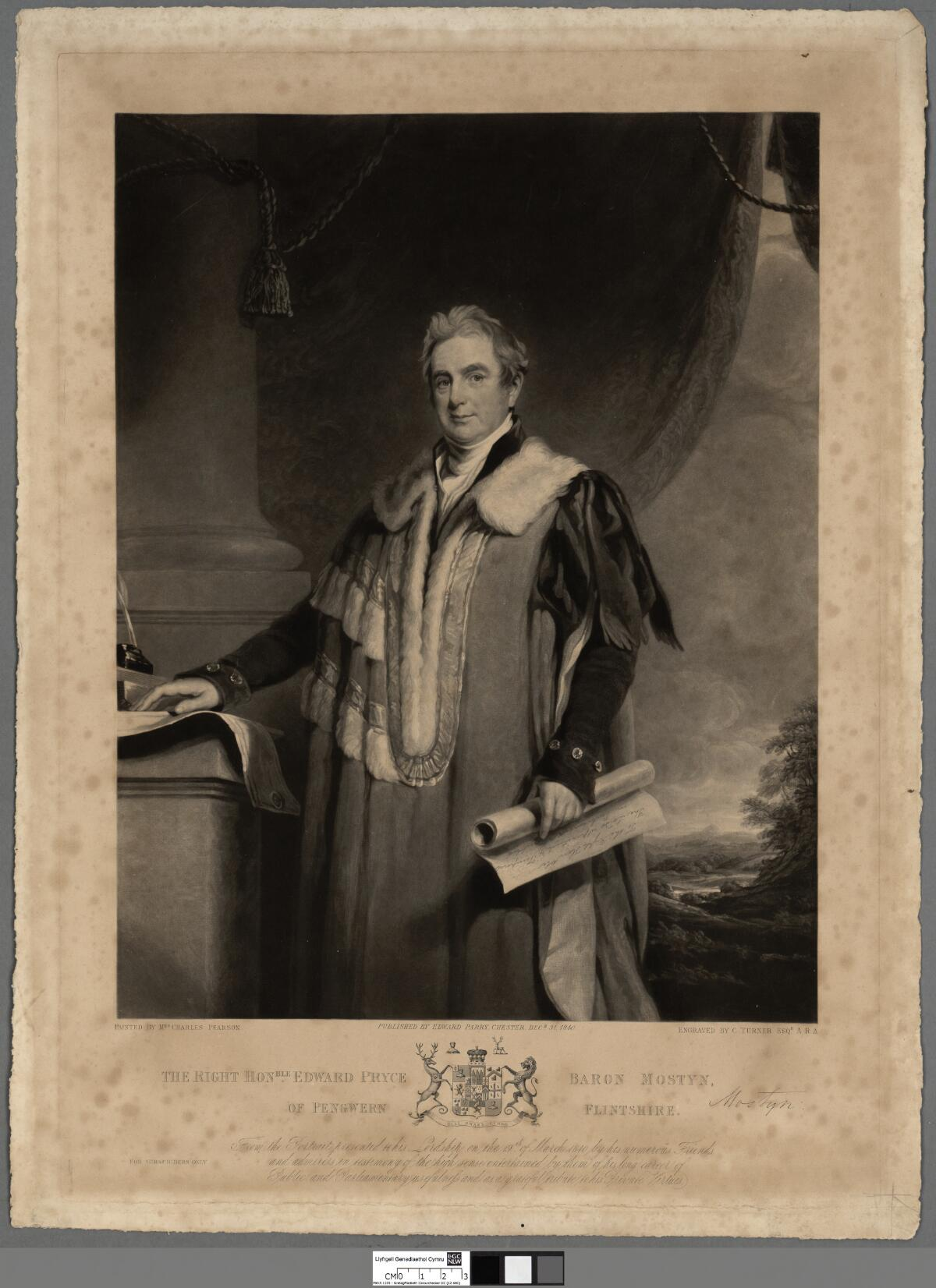
Edward Pryce Lloyd by Charles Turner

Edward Pryce Lloyd, 1st Baron Mostyn (17 September 1768 – 3 April 1854), known as Sir Edward Lloyd, 2nd Baronet from 1795 to 1831, was a British politician.

== Life ==
He was born the son of Bell Lloyd of Pontryffyd and Bodfach and succeeded his uncle Sir Edward Pryce Lloyd, 1st Baronet, as second Baronet of Pengwerra in 1795, according to a special remainder in the letters patent. On 11 February 1794 he married Elizabeth, third daughter of Sir Roger Mostyn, 5th Baronet.

He was High Sheriff of Flintshire for 1796, High Sheriff of Caernarvonshire for 1797 and High Sheriff of Merionethshire for 1804. In 1806 he was elected to the House of Commons for Flint Boroughs, a seat he held until 1807 and again from 1812 to 1831 and also represented Beaumaris between 1807 and 1812. In 1831, after his wife had inherited the main estates of the unmarried Sir Thomas Mostyn, 6th Baronet, he was raised to the peerage as Baron Mostyn, of Mostyn in County Flint.

He lived at Pengwern, between Rhuddlan and St Asaph in Flintshire, in a house that had been built by his great uncle, Sir Edward Lloyd. A guide book to the area published in 1847 described him as "a genuine Welshman [who] speaks with fluency the language of his country", adding that "his lordship keeps two packs of hounds for the amusement of his friends and the neighbouring gentry; and though in the 78th year of his age, seldom misses mounting his scarlet, particularly if the hounds turn out within eight or ten miles of his mansion."

In 1840 a group of friends and admirers presented him with a portrait of himself, painted by Mary Martha Pearson.

Lord Mostyn died in April 1854, aged 85, and was succeeded in his titles by his son Edward.

== Issue ==
1. Hon Edward Mostyn Lloyd Mostyn MP born 13 January 1795. Married 20 June 1827 to Lady Harriet Margaret Scott (eldest daughter of the Earl of Clonmel, with issue)

2. Hon. Elizabeth b. 19 August 1796

3. Thomas Price d. 4 August 1800

4. Hon. Essex b. 18 April 1807

Parliament of the United Kingdom
Preceded by Watkin Williams	Member of Parliament for Flint Burghs; 1806–1807	Succeeded by William Shipley
Preceded by The Lord Newborough	Member of Parliament for Beaumaris; 1807–1812	Succeeded by Thomas Frankland Lewis
Preceded by William Shipley	Member of Parliament for Flint Burghs; 1812–1831	Succeeded by Henry Glynne
Peerage of the United Kingdom
New creation	Baron Mostyn; 1831–1854	Succeeded by Edward Mostyn Lloyd-Mostyn
Baronetage of Great Britain
Preceded by Edward Lloyd	Baronet (of Pengwerra); 1795–1854	Succeeded by Edward Mostyn Lloyd-Mostyn
