= Mostyn =

Village and community in Flintshire, Wales

- Village and community
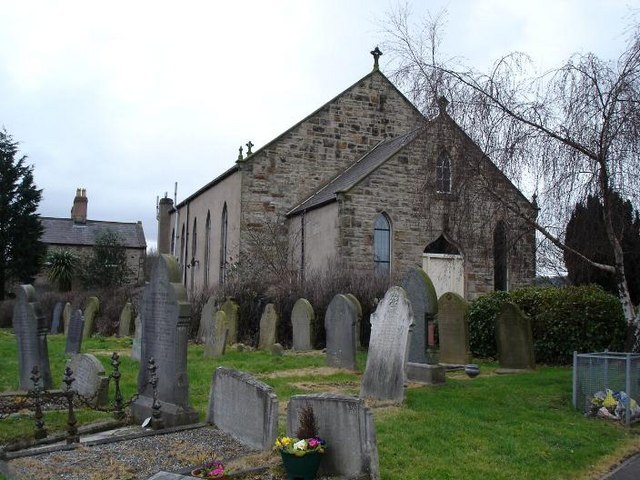
- St. Margaret's Church, Mostyn

- Location within Flintshire
- Population: 1,844 (2011)
- OS grid reference: SJ155805
- Principal area: Flintshire
- Preserved county: Clwyd
- Country: Wales
- Sovereign state: United Kingdom
- Post town: HOLYWELL
- Postcode district: CH8
- Dialling code: 01745
- Police: North Wales
- Fire: North Wales
- Ambulance: Welsh
- UK Parliament: Clwyd East
- Senedd Cymru – Welsh Parliament: Delyn
- Website: Council website
- List of places UK Wales Flintshire 53.314°N 3.269°W Map of the community

Mostyn is a village and community in Flintshire, Wales, and electoral ward lying on the estuary of the River Dee, located near the town of Holywell. It has a privately owned port that has in the past had a colliery and ironworks and was involved in the export of commodities, and in present times services the offshore wind industry and shipped the wings for the Airbus A380 which were manufactured at Broughton.

== History ==
Mostyn was mentioned in the Doomsday Book of 1086. Henry Bolingbroke (later Henry IV) landed here in 1399 before attacking Richard II at Flint Castle. Coal was mined at Mostyn Colliery and iron production started in the mid nineteenth century. The combination of a colliery, iron works and the docks made this a profitable enterprise. Nineteen hundred people were employed at one time. The coal eventually became exhausted and the ironworks closed in 1965. Between 1848 and 1966 there was a railway station in the village on the Chester to Holyhead line. Mostyn once served as a port from which ferries used to sail (until 2004) to Dublin on the Liverpool-Dublin route. Today, manufactured wings for the Airbus A380 aircraft leave Mostyn on the ship Ville de Bordeaux, after travelling down the River Dee by barge from the Airbus wing factory at Broughton, Flintshire. See Itinéraire à Grand Gabarit for more details of the transportation. Mostyn's port area is home to the headquarters of Warwick International Group Limited, manufacturers of bleach activators for detergent applications.

== Port of Mostyn ==
The Port of Mostyn is privately owned and is one of the oldest ports in the country; in the past, it handled cargoes including steel, coal, timber, woodpulp, animal feedstuffs and fertilizers. Nowadays, it specialises in the assembly and installation of wind turbines. It has been involved in the construction of North Hoyle (constructed 2003–2004), Burbo Bank (2006–2007), Rhyl Flats (2008–2009), Gwynt y Môr (2012–2015), Robin Rigg and Walney windfarms.

In early 2023, the Port of Mostyn applied to Natural Resources Wales (NRW) for a marine licence. This was to build a new 350 metre-long quay wall and reclaim 4.5 hectares of land behind it to create new berths for ships, as well as deepening existing berths and re-dredging the approach channel.

== Mostyn Hall ==
Mostyn Hall is a large Grade I listed country house, set in extensive gardens; it lies around half a mile to the north-west of the village. It is surrounded by gardens and parkland, and is approached from the south driveway. The former gatehouse, Porth Mawr, lies to the south-west and a complex of farm buildings to the west.

== The village ==
Just down the A548 road from Mostyn at Llanerch-y-Mor is the now closed Mostyn Fun Ship. The ship started life as the Duke of Lancaster, a car ferry and cruise ship. After it was permanently dry-docked in Mostyn, it earned its later name from its new operation as an arcade and bar.

== Governance ==
Mostyn is also an electoral ward, coterminous with the community. It elects one county councillor to Flintshire County Council. A by-election was held on 31 July 2014 after the disqualification of the longstanding Independent councillor, Patrick Heesom,

On the 5th May 2022, as part of the most recent 2022 Welsh local elections, Mostyn elected Pamela Banks who was represented as an independent, by a 26% majority as former councillor Patrick Heesom saw defeat.

== Demographics ==
=== Languages ===
According to the United Kingdom Census 2021, 14.9 per cent of all usual residents aged 3+ in Mostyn can speak Welsh. 22.5 per cent of the population noted that they could speak, read, write or understand Welsh. The 2011 census noted 18.2 per cent of all usual residents aged 3 years and older in the village could speak Welsh.

=== Country of Birth ===
The 2011 Census noted that 98.0 per cent of the population was born in the United Kingdom; 64.0 per cent of the population was born in Wales and 33.1 per cent of the population was born in England.

== Notable people ==
- Emlyn Williams, Welsh dramatist and actor

== See also ==
- Mostyn Baronets
- Mostyn Colliery
