= Mostyn baronets =

Baronetcy in the Baronetage of England

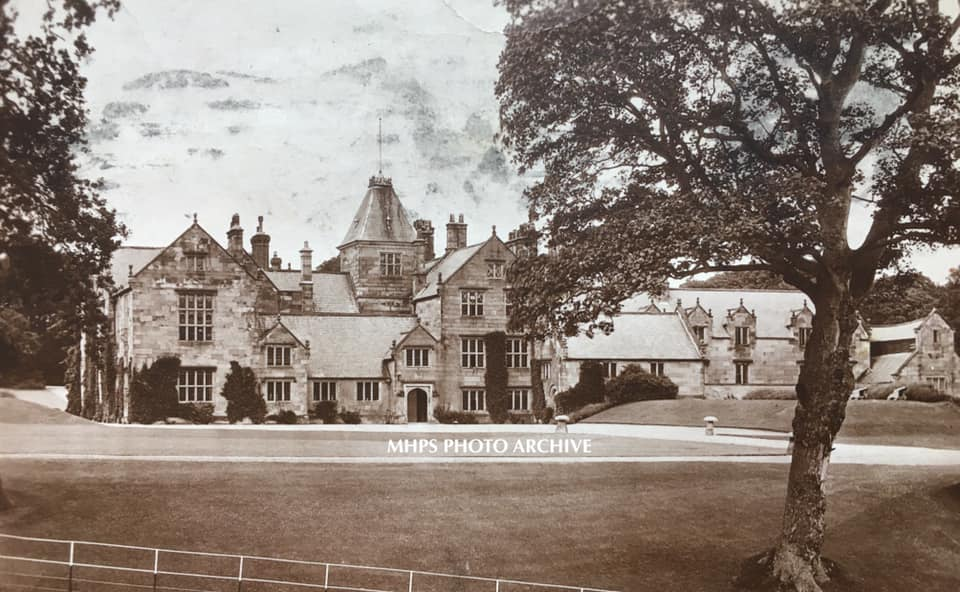
Mostyn Hall, old picture, from the Mostyn History Preservation Society

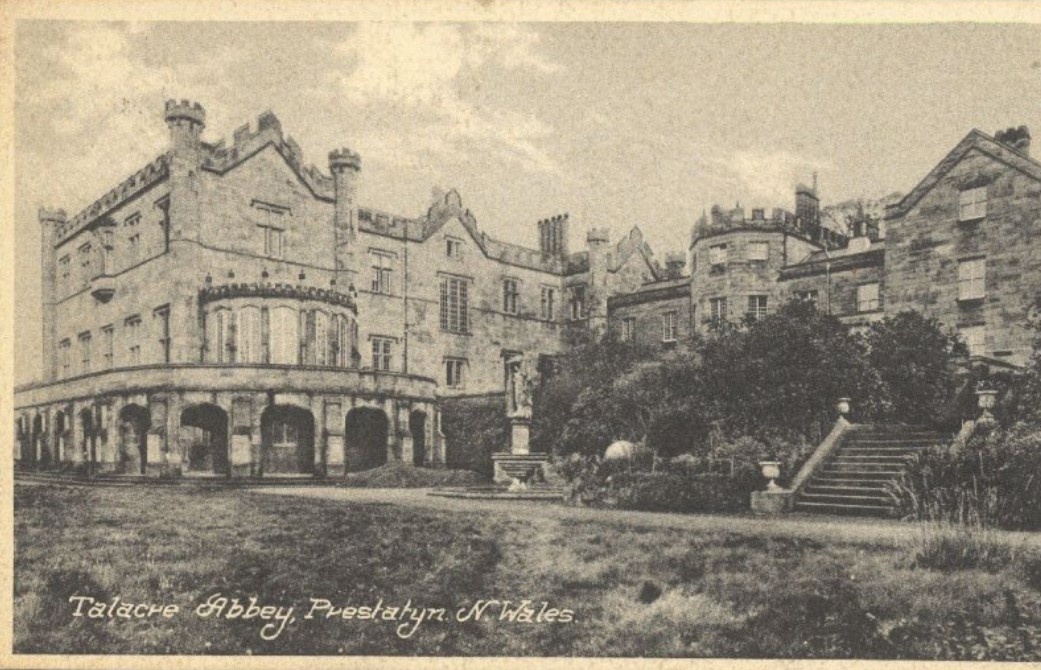
Talacre Abbey, later Westbury Castle, Wales, Mostyn family

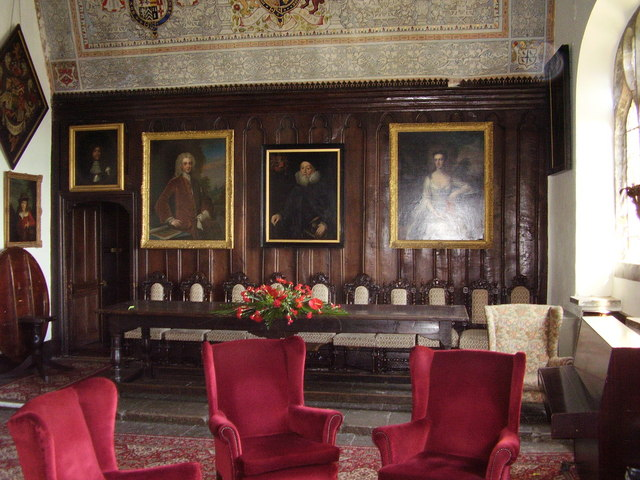
Gloddaeth Hall, Conwy: the hall, with Mostyn family portraits

The Mostyn baronets are two lines of Welsh baronets holding baronetcies created in 1660 and 1670, both in the Baronetage of England. One creation is extant as of 2015.

== Mostyn of Mostyn ==
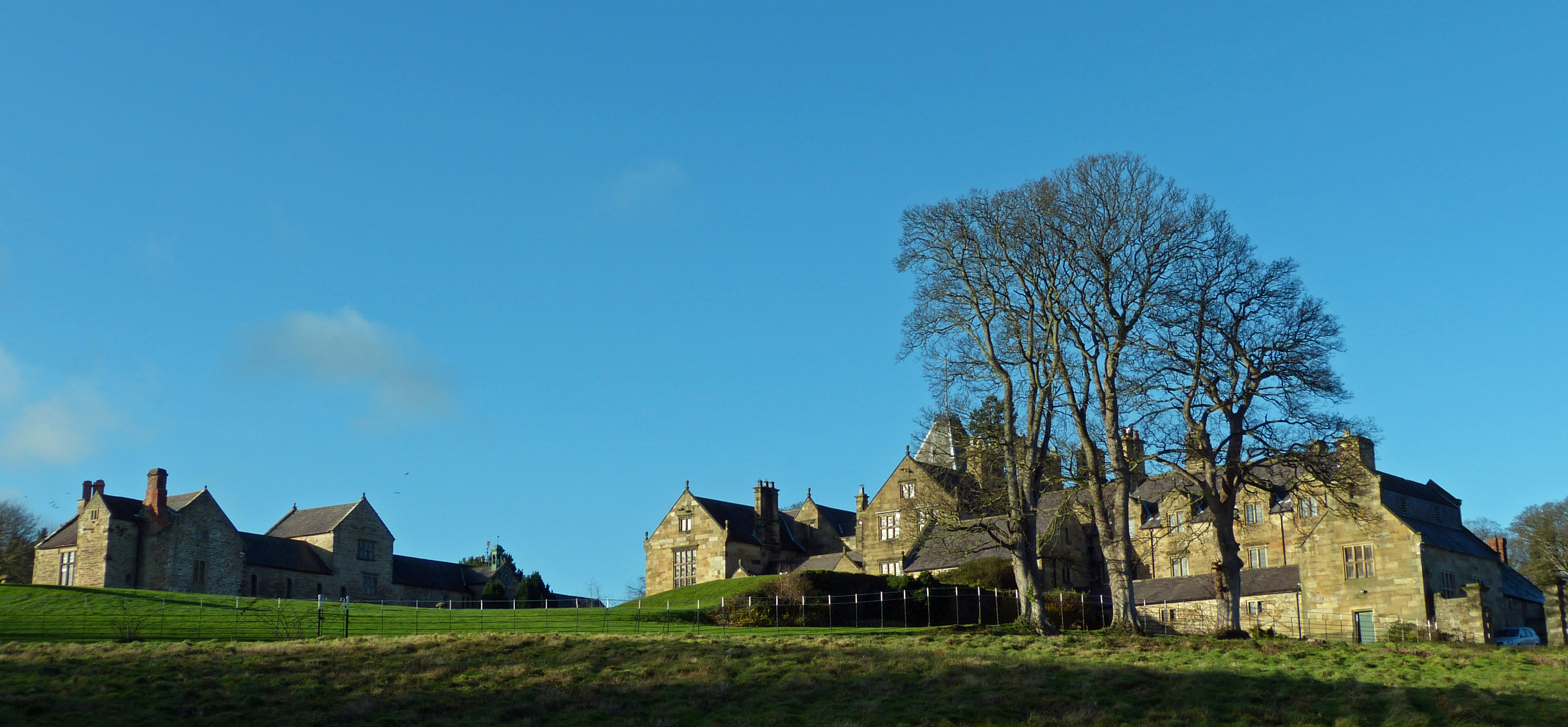
Mostyn Hall, rear view

The Mostyn Baronetcy, of Mostyn in the County of Flint, was created in the Baronetage of England on 3 August 1660 for Roger Mostyn. The second Baronet sat as Member of Parliament for Caernarfon. The third Baronet represented Flintshire, Flint and Cheshire in the House of Commons and served as Lord-Lieutenant of Flintshire.

The fourth, fifth and sixth Baronets all sat as Members of Parliament for Flintshire. Ann Mostyn, daughter of the fourth Baronet, married Thomas Pennant of Downing Hall. The fifth Baronet was also Lord-Lieutenant of Flintshire. The title became extinct on the death of the sixth Baronet in 1831. Elizabeth, sister of the sixth Baronet, married Sir Edward Pryce Lloyd, 2nd Baronet. In 1831 he was created Baron Mostyn, to which the Lloyd Mostyn Baronetcy is a subsidiary title.

== Mostyn of Talacre ==
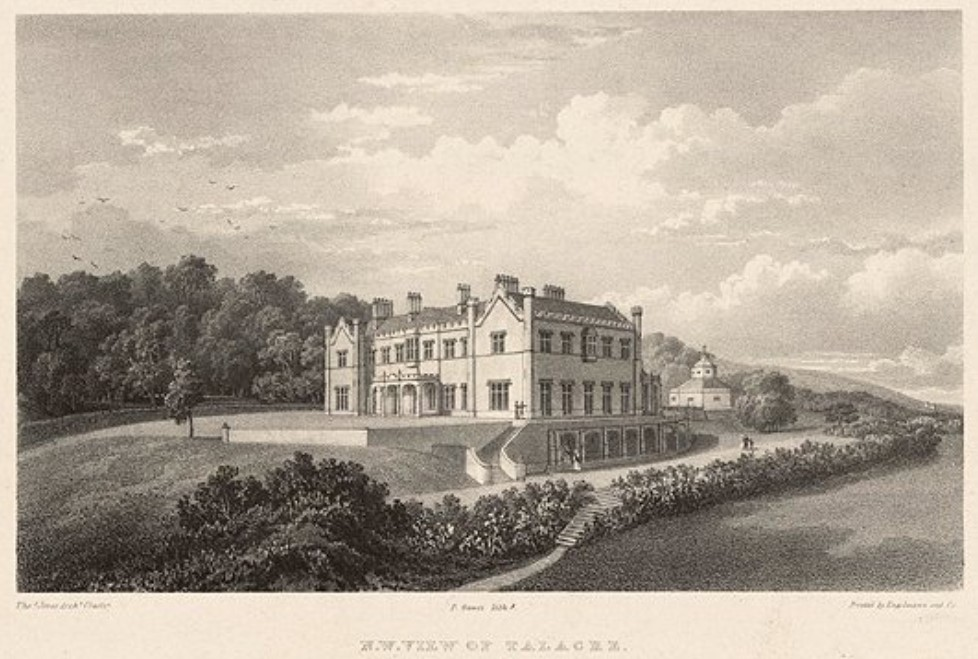
Talacre Hall, Flintshire, North West view, seat of Sir E. Mostyn

The Mostyn Baronetcy, of Talacre in the County of Flint, was created in the Baronetage of England on 28 April 1670 for Edward Mostyn. This family descends from Richard ap Hewell, who was seated at Mostyn in the reign of King Henry VIII. His son, Pyers Mostyn, of Talacre, was the great-grandfather of the first Baronet.

Charles Mostyn, son of Charles Mostyn, second son of the fifth Baronet, married Mary Lucinda (née Butler) (died 1831), a descendant of Mary, eldest sister of Henry Vaux, 5th Baron Vaux of Harrowden (on whose death in 1663 the barony fell into abeyance).

In 1838 the barony of Vaux of Harrowden was called out of abeyance in favour of their son George Charles Mostyn, who became the sixth Baron. See the Baron Vaux of Harrowden for further history of this branch of the family.

The Most Reverend Francis Mostyn, fourth son of the eighth Baronet, was Roman Catholic Archbishop of Cardiff. Sir (Joseph) David Frederick Mostyn (1928–2007), great-grandson of Captain Edward Henry Mostyn, second son of the seventh Baronet, was a General in the Royal Green Jackets.

The family sold the Talacre estate in 1919.

== List of Mostyn baronets, of Mostyn (1660) ==
Mostyn baronets's arms

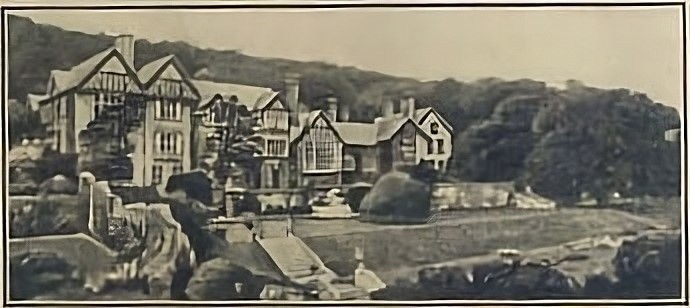
Gloddaeth Hall, 1935

- Sir Roger Mostyn, 1st Baronet (c. 1620 – c. 1690)
- Sir Thomas Mostyn, 2nd Baronet (1651–1692)
- Sir Roger Mostyn, 3rd Baronet (1673–1739)
- Sir Thomas Mostyn, 4th Baronet (1704–1758)
- Sir Roger Mostyn, 5th Baronet (1734–1796)
- Sir Thomas Mostyn, 6th Baronet (1776–1831)

== List of Mostyn baronets, of Talacre (1670) ==
- Sir Edward Mostyn, 1st Baronet (1636–1715)
- Sir Pyers Mostyn, 2nd Baronet (1655–1720)
- Sir Pyers Mostyn, 3rd Baronet (1682–1735)
- Sir George Mostyn, 4th Baronet (1690–1746)
- Sir Edward Mostyn, 5th Baronet (1725–1775)
- Sir Pyers Mostyn, 6th Baronet (1749–1823)
- Sir Edward Mostyn, 7th Baronet (1785–1841)
- Sir Pyers Mostyn, 8th Baronet (1811–1882)
- Sir Pyers William Mostyn, 9th Baronet (1846–1912)
- Sir Pyers Charles Mostyn, 10th Baronet (1895–1917)
- Sir Pyers George Joseph Mostyn, 11th Baronet (1893–1937)
- Sir Pyers Edward Mostyn, 12th Baronet (1928–1955)
- Sir Basil Anthony Trevor Mostyn, 13th Baronet (1902–1956)
- Sir Jeremy John Anthony Mostyn, 14th Baronet (1933–1988)
- Sir William Basil John Mostyn, 15th Baronet (born 1975)

== See also ==
- Baron Mostyn
