= Mostyn Hall =

Grade I listed building in Flintshire

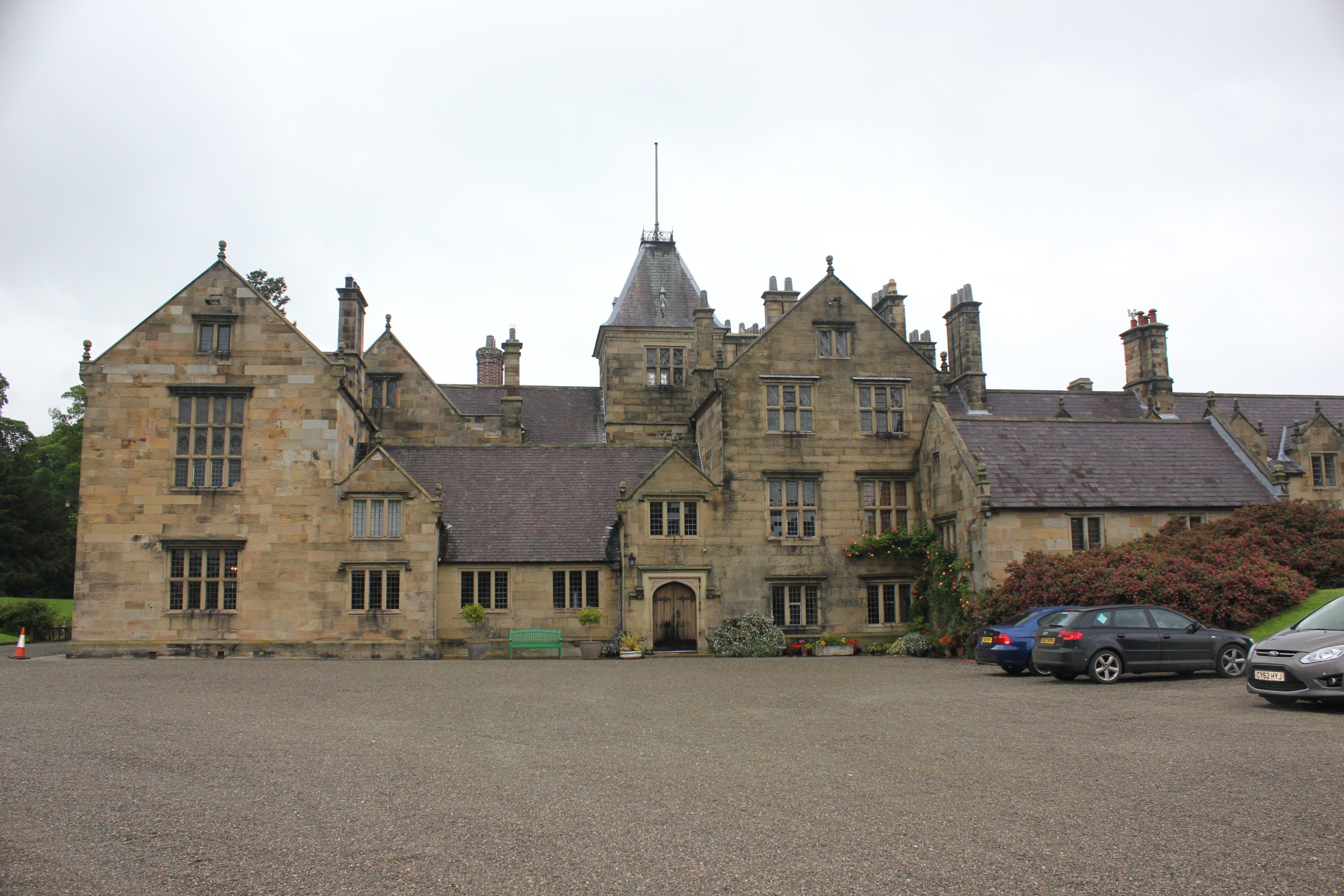
- The entrance front

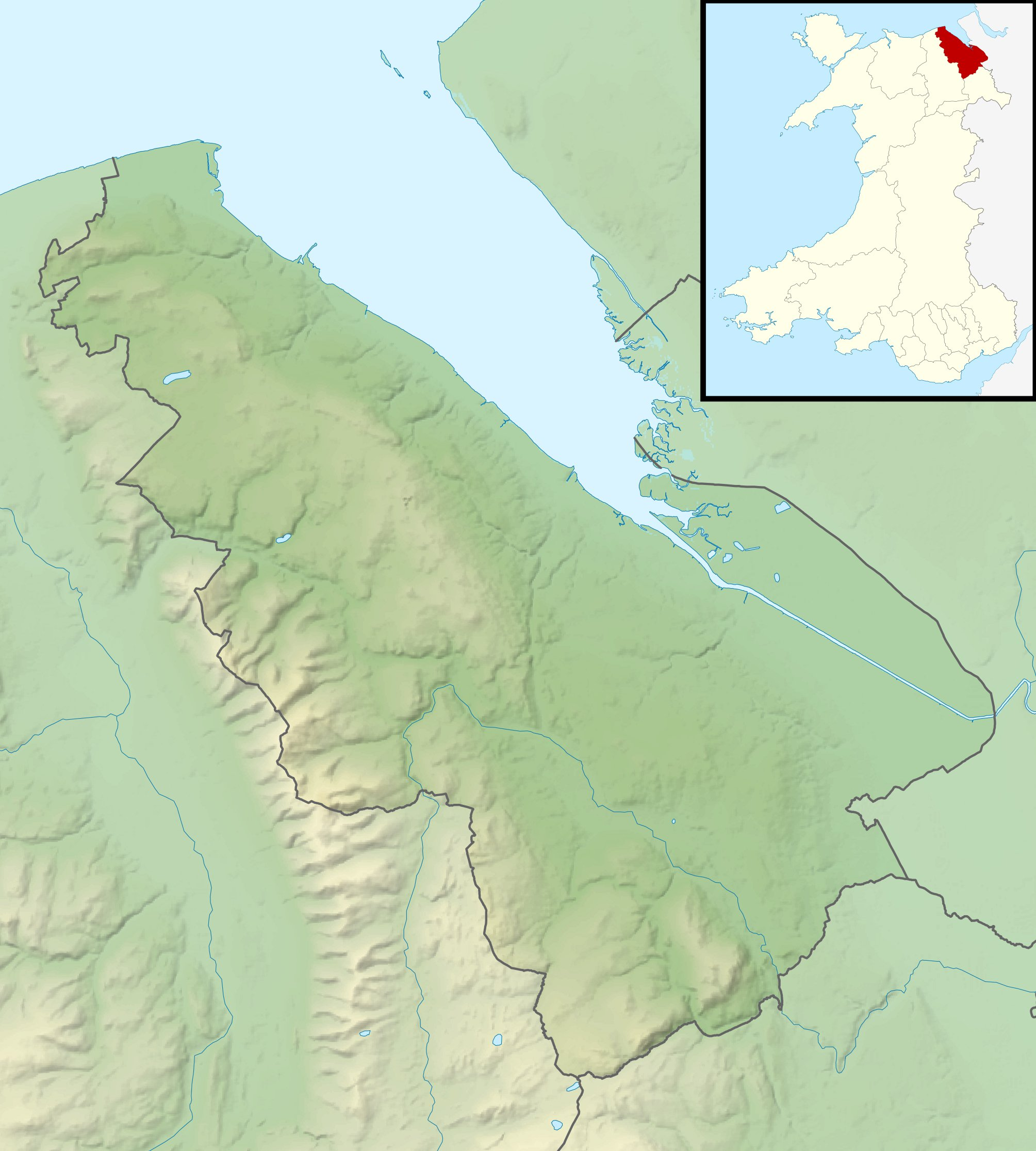
- Location within Flintshire
- 53.3164°N 3.2799°W
- Type: House
- Location: Mostyn, Flintshire, Wales

History
- Built: Medieval origins, rebuilt in the 19th century

Site notes
- Architect(s): Ambrose Poynter, for the 19th century reconstruction
- Architectural style: Jacobethan
- Governing body: Privately owned

Listed Building – Grade I
- Official name: Mostyn Hall
- Designated: 22 October 1952
- Reference no.: 21517

Listed Building – Grade I
- Official name: Porth Mawr, Mostyn Hall
- Designated: 22 October 1952
- Reference no.: 21516

Listed Building – Grade II*
- Official name: Dovecote and adjoining range at Mostyn Hall
- Designated: 28 March 2002
- Reference no.: 26265

Listed Building – Grade II*
- Official name: North-east Barn at Mostyn Hall Farm with adjoining stable range and flanking wall
- Designated: 28 March 2002
- Reference no.: 26269

Listed Building – Grade II*
- Official name: South-west Farm Building at Mostyn Hall Farm
- Designated: 28 March 2002
- Reference no.: 26267

Mostyn Hall is a large house standing in 25 acres (10 hectares) of garden near the village of Mostyn, Flintshire, Wales. It is designated by Cadw as a Grade I listed building.

== History ==
It is not known for how long a building has been present on the site, but the great hall is thought to have been built by 1470. The house was substantially upgraded in 1631-2 by Roger and Mary Mostyn, descendants of Ieuan Fychan, whose grandson had adopted the Mostyn surname.

Since 1660 the hall has been the seat of the Mostyn Baronets, and since 1831, of the barons Mostyn. In the 1840s the 1st Baron Mostyn commissioned architect Ambrose Poynter to remodel the house, which was carried out mainly in 1846–47 in a Jacobethan style inspired by the pre-existing building.

Porth Mawr is a former Tudor gatehouse block to the south west of the house which dates from 1570. Ornamental entrance gates leading to the house were designed in early 18th-century Baroque style by the Chester architect John Douglas and constructed by James Swindley in 1896.

The hall is still in the hands of the Mostyn family. Since 2014 it has been open to the public on a limited number of days in the year.

== Architecture and description ==
=== Listing designations ===
Mostyn Hall is listed Grade I, the highest grade, as is Porth Mawr. A number of barns and agricultural buildings on the Mostyn Estate are listed Grade II* including the dovecote and attached range, a barn to the north-east, another to the north-west, and a farm range to the south-west. A house, and weighbridge are listed at Grade II, as are John Douglas's gates. On the wider estate, listed structures include an icehouse, the walled garden, and a gamekeeper's cottage. At the estate's perimeter, a number of lodges and their associated gates and railings all have Grade II listings including Drybridge Lodge, Ivy House, Penlan Lodge, and Seaview Lodge. The gardens are listed as Grade II* in the Cadw/ICOMOS Register of Parks and Gardens of Special Historic Interest in Wales.

== Gallery ==
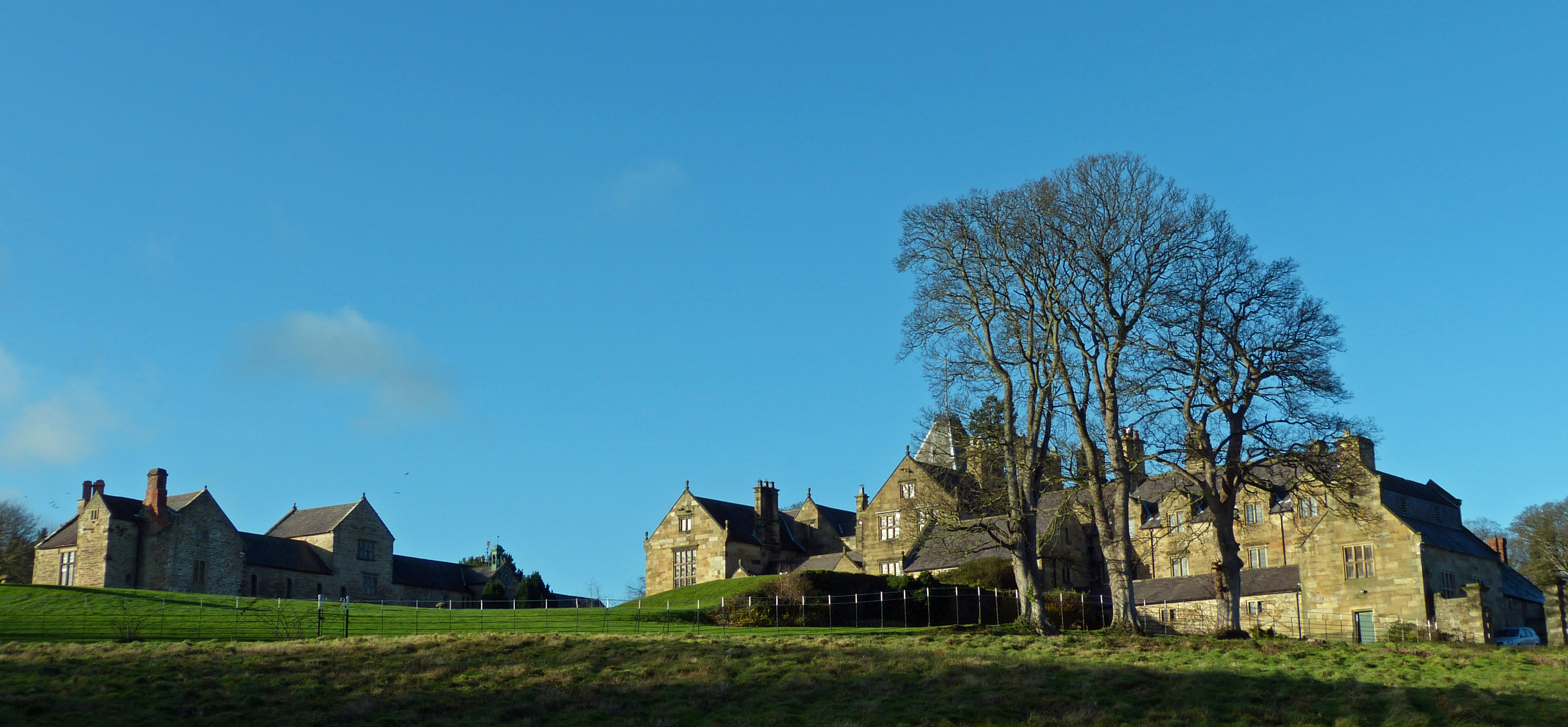
rear view

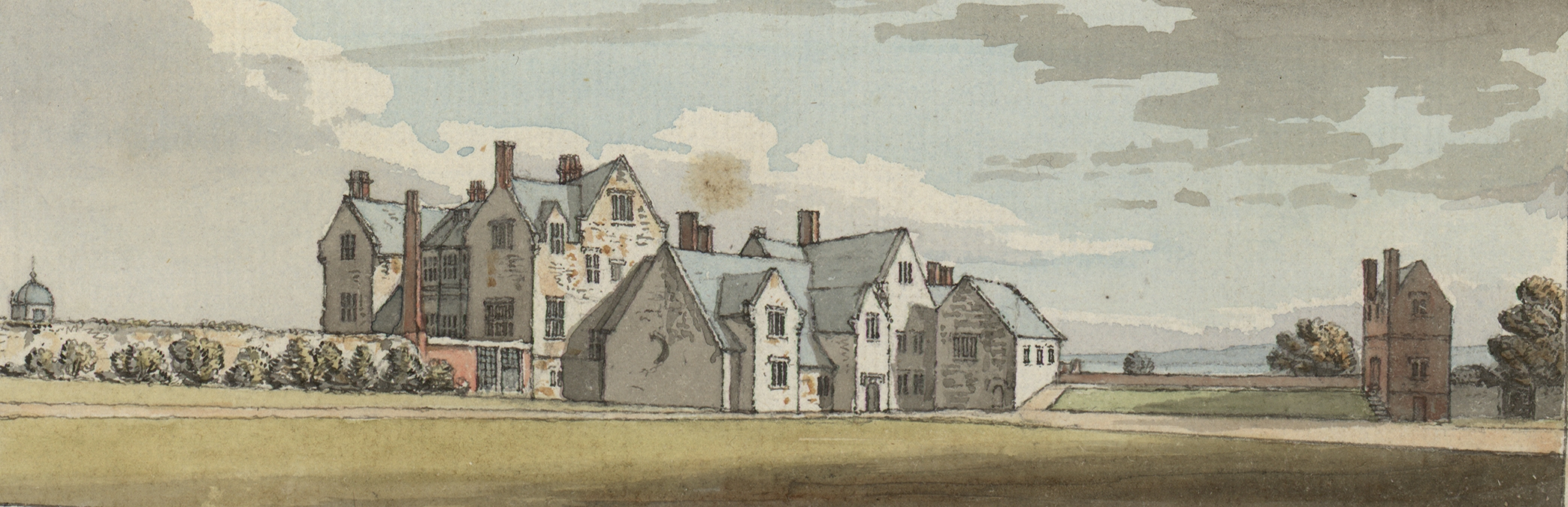
Mostyn Hall. c.1781

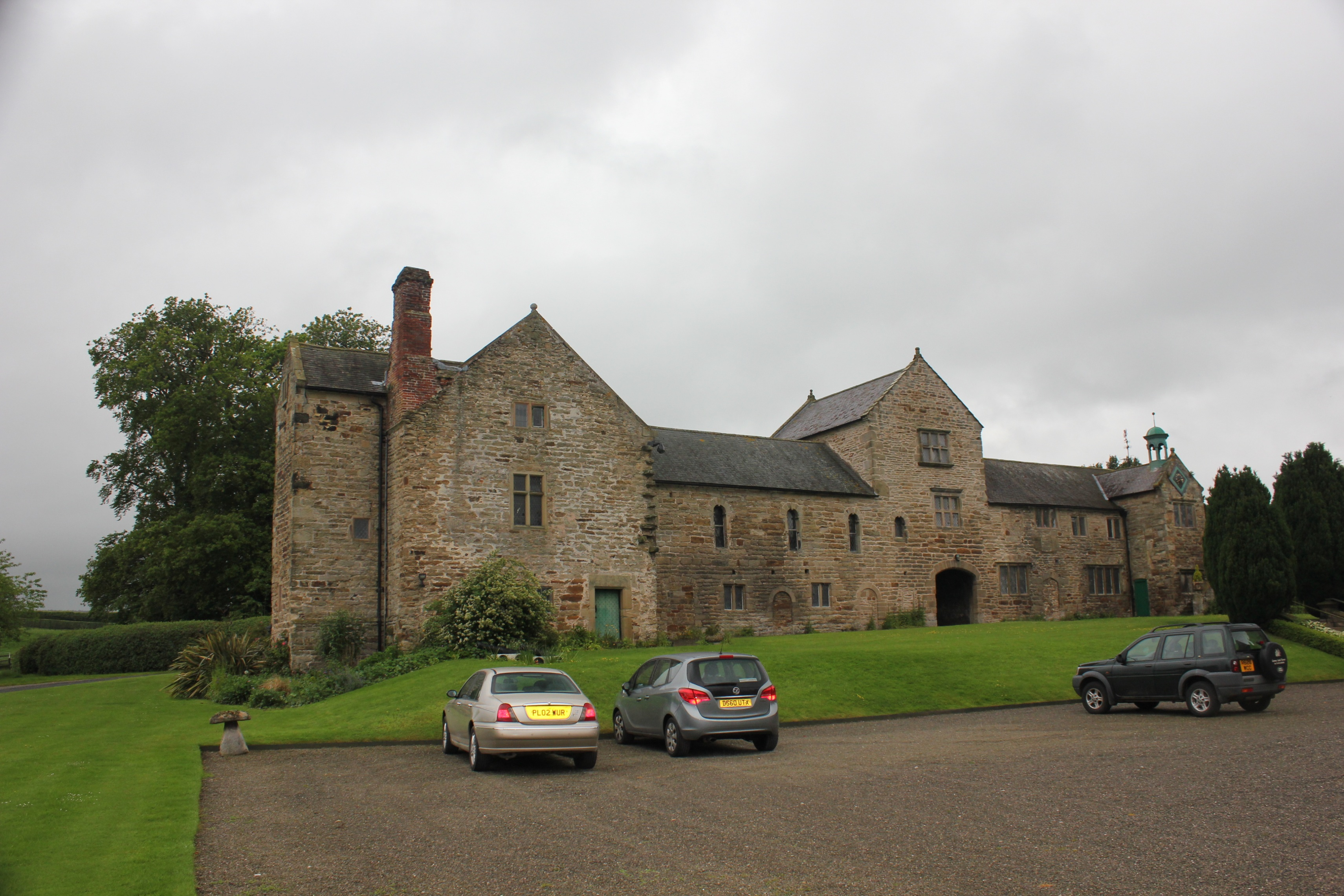
Porth Mawr

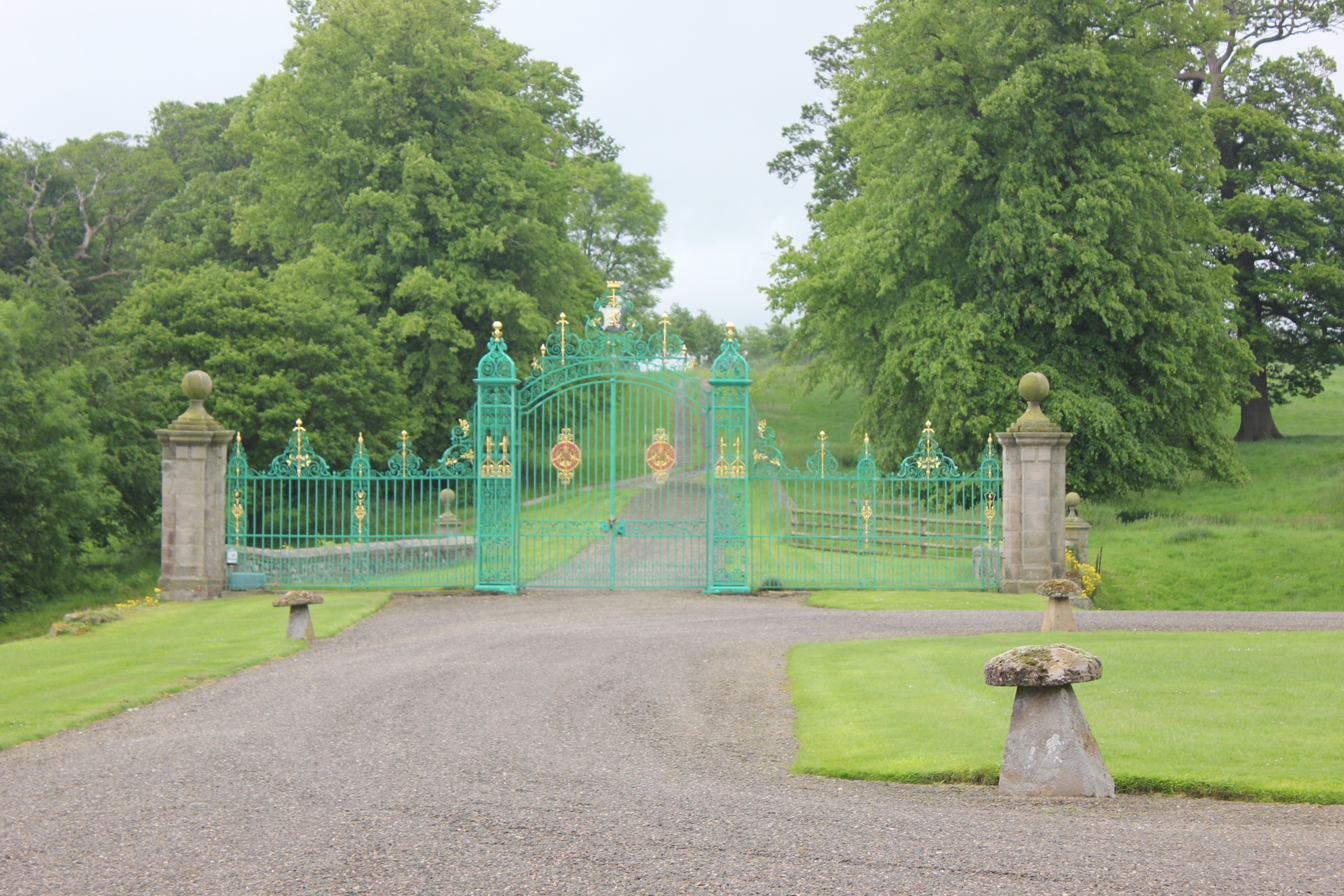
Mostyn Hall gates

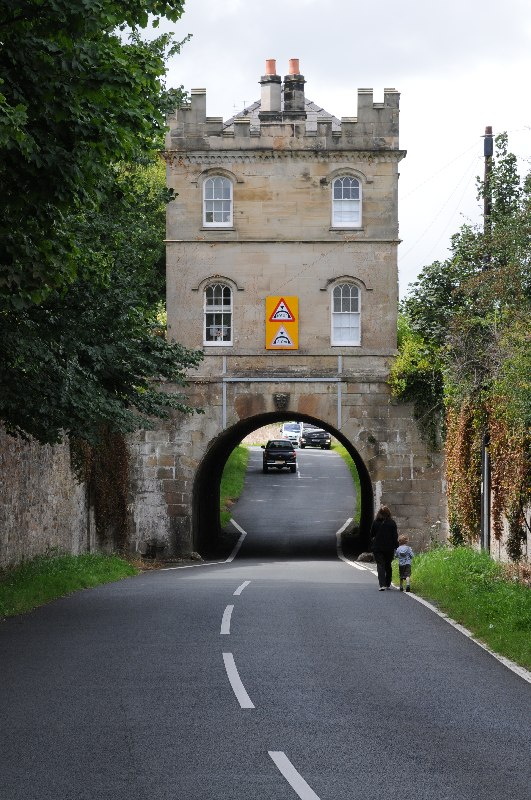
Drybridge Lodge

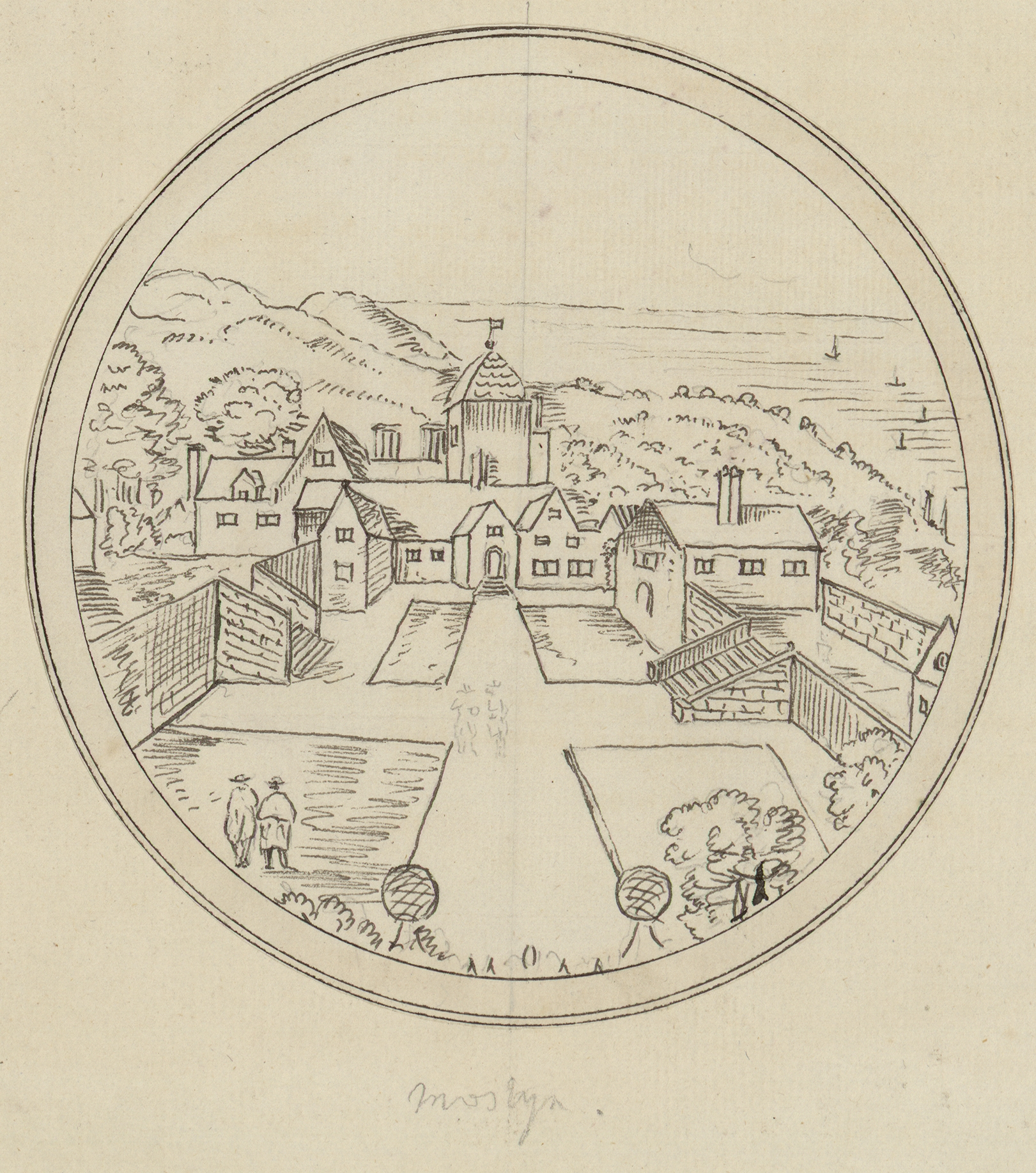
Sketch of the courtyard at Mostyn before the house was remodelled in the 1840s

== Sources ==
- Hubbard, Edward (2003). Clwyd (Denbighshire and Flintshire). The Buildings of Wales. New Haven and London: Yale University Press. ISBN 978-0-300-09627-9. OCLC 315792534.
