= Point of Ayr Colliery Company =

19th century Welsh coal firm

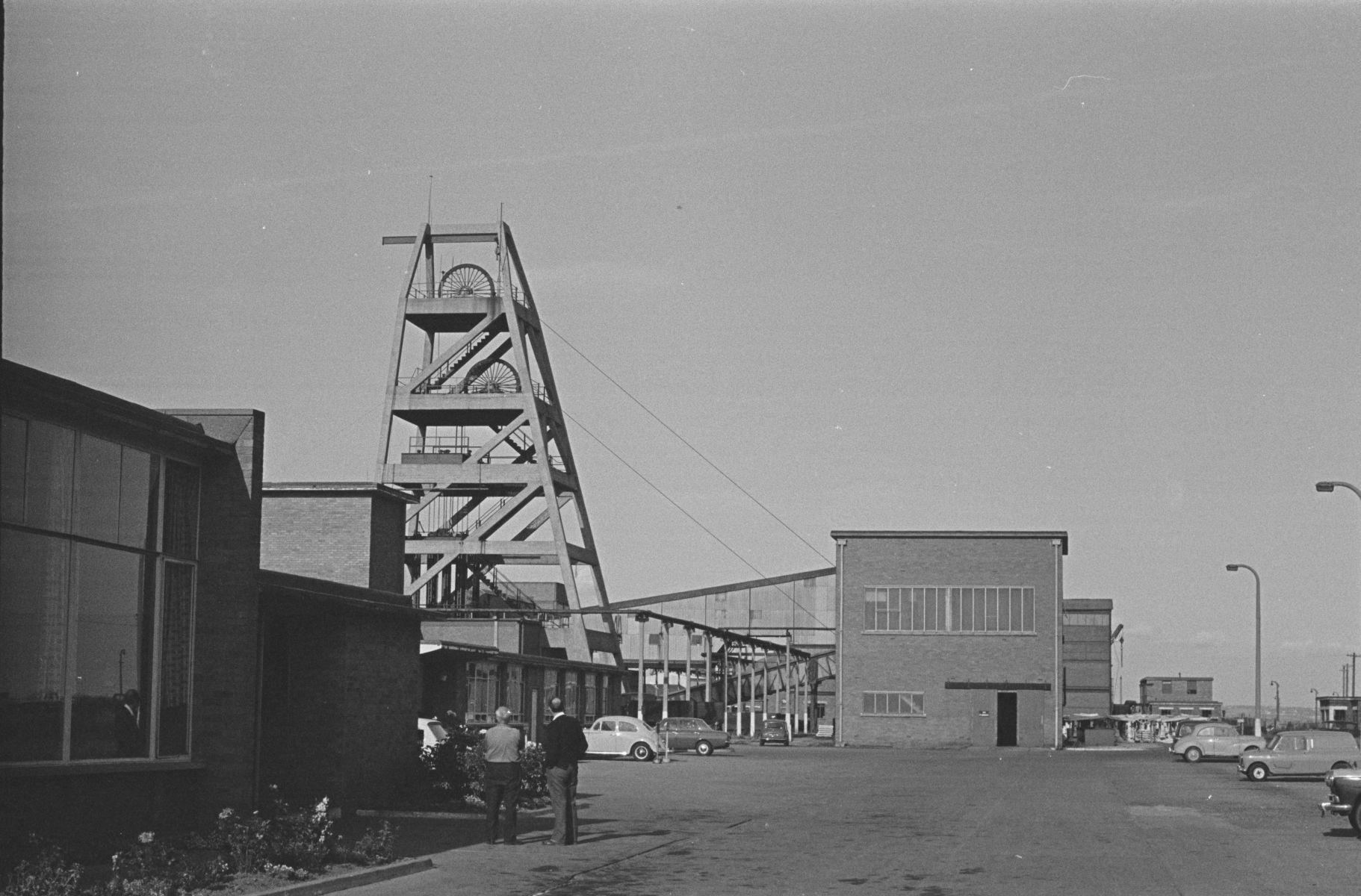

The Point of Ayr Colliery Company was formed in 1883, and was the third company to attempt to extract coal from the North Wales Coalfield using a pit head at Point of Ayr, in Flintshire, Wales. The two previous attempts were carried out by the Prestatyn Coal Company, 1865, under the direction of Lord Mostyn, owner of the nearby Mostyn Colliery, and the Western Mostyn Colliery Company, 1873.

This new company made use of a shaft sunk in 1873, which had been abandoned because the heading driven out from that shaft had struck a fault. The Point of Ayr Colliery Company decided to strike out in another direction, where they struck a seam in 1890. The original shaft, of 100 yards (91 m), was deepened to 215 yards (197 m), and a second shaft was sunk to the same depth - these became known as No. 1 and No. 2 shafts respectively.

According to contemporary figures from the Inspector of Mines, by 1896 356 men were employed by the company, which produced coal for domestic and industrial applications.

The British coal industry was nationalised in 1947.
