= Coal tips in Wales =

Status of high-risk spoil tips in Wales

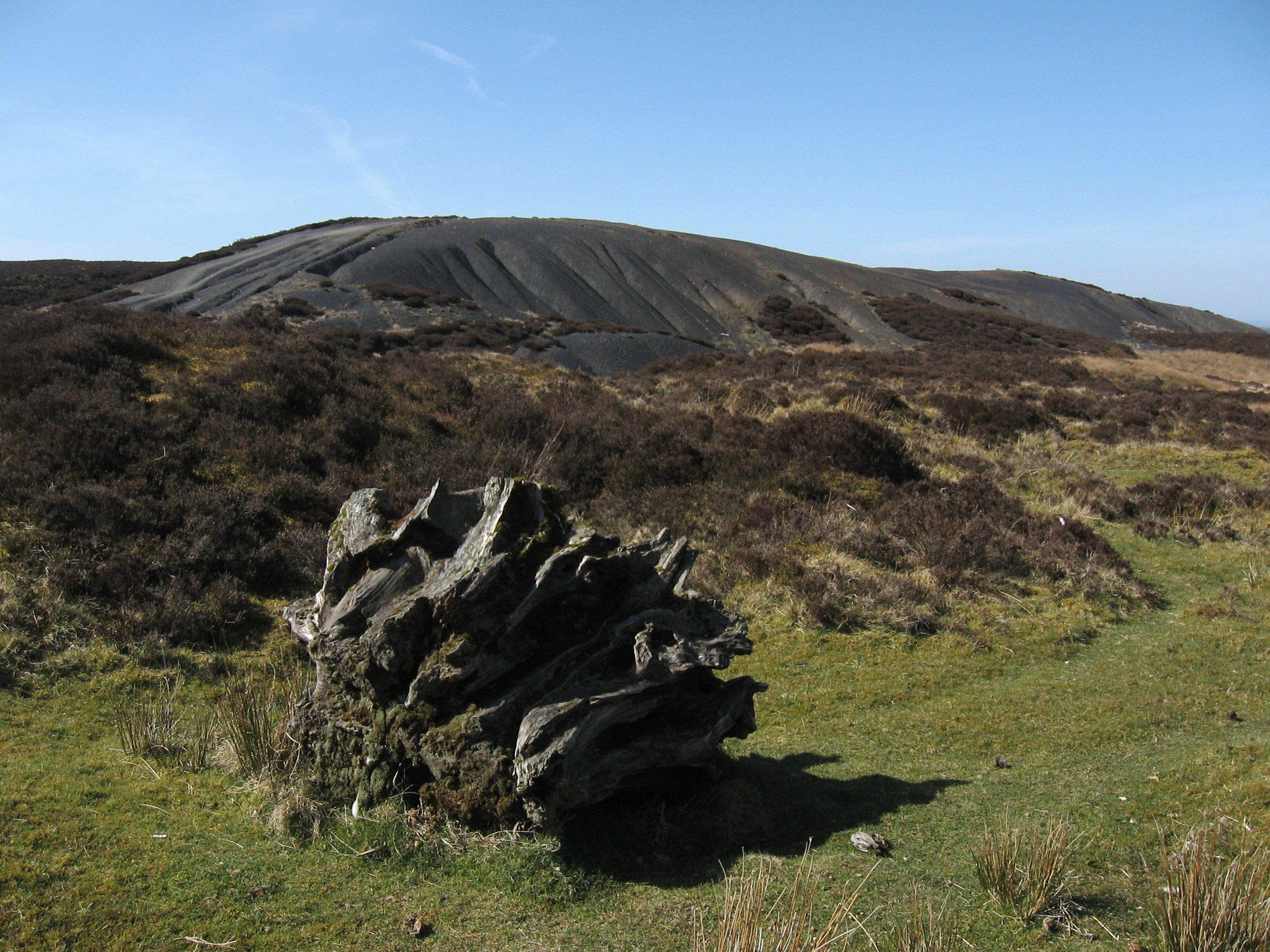
Coal tips above Blaenavon

There are just over 2,500 coal spoil tips in Wales, with a large number classed as "high risk", following recent landslides in the South Wales Valleys. A taskforce was set up by the Welsh and UK governments to investigate the issue, with the Coal Authority conducting inspections.

Funding for ensuring the safety of the coal tips had become a source of dispute between the UK and Welsh governments as coal tip safety is devolved to Wales. The UK Government states no additional funding would be provided on a devolved matter. However, Welsh politicians argue coal tips pre-date devolution and therefore the UK Government should contribute. It is estimated to cost between £500 million and £600 million over 10–15 years to fully address the issue.

In late 2024, the UK Government committed £25 million for 2025–26 towards coal tip safety, and together with Welsh Government commitments comprise £100 million in funding allocated to coal tip safety until 2026. In December 2024, the Welsh Government announced their proposed Disused Mine and Quarry Tips (Wales) Bill, to set up The Disused Tips Authority for Wales by April 2027, to oversee Wales' disused tips.

== Background and history ==
Wales has numerous coal tips, as a legacy of its coal industry. It is estimated it is home to 40% of all UK coal tips. Almost all coal tips are disused, however they continue to present safety risks, such as the possibility of pollution, landslides, flooding and spontaneous combustion. Climate change has been connected to the increasing intensity of rainfall in the winter and flash flooding, increasing the risk of coal tips becoming more unstable. The 1966 Aberfan disaster, where a coal tip in Aberfan collapsed killing 116 children and 28 adults, was the worst mining-related disaster in Wales' and Britain's history, and serves as a reminder of the potential risk of unstable coal tips.

=== Risk of collapse ===
On 16 February 2020, following Storm Dennis, a slip occurred at the Llanwonno coal tip on the western slopes of Cefn Gwyngul at Tylorstown, Rhondda Fach. 20 tips were then checked to ensure no more slips could occur. Following which a joint task force, the "Coal Tip Safety Taskforce" was set up by the Welsh and UK governments to assess the risk of coal tips in Wales and to review existing policy on the management of disused coal tips. The Coal Authority was commissioned to inspect coal tips in Wales, and report any urgent work needed. There is no standard approach to assessing the risk of coal tips in the Mines and Quarries (Tips) Act 1969, with the Coal Authority relying on Rhondda Cynon Taf County Borough Council's method of assessment to categorise the risk of the tips. Following the slip, it was revealed no national list of coal tips existed.

The first round of inspections of coal tips by the Authority was completed in July 2020.

In October 2020, the UK Government provided £2.5 million to clean up the Tylorstown site, which involved the cleaning up of 60,000 tonnes (130,000,000 lb) of collapsed soil, which started in June 2020. In November, it was reported that securing 2,000 old coal tips in Wales, would potentially cost between £500 million and £600 million over the next 10–15 years. With repairs in Rhondda Cynon Taf only, estimated to be £82.5 million. In December 2020, another landslip of the coal tip in Wattstown, Rhondda Cynon Taf occurred, although there were no properties near the tip.

In 2021, the Welsh Government announced it would review the legislation on coal tip inspection and maintenance, with the Law Commission. By October 2021, slips had occurred near Clydach Vale, Mountain Ash, Clydach and Pontygwaith. In May 2022, the Welsh Government published a white paper on coal safety. The government also recommended the establishment of a "new supervisory body" to oversee coal tip safety in Wales.

In 2023, the Welsh Government released an interactive map of the 350 disused coal tips that are required to have more frequent inspections. The government also contacted 1,500 landowners and almost 600 property occupiers in Wales, informing them that there is a coal tip (entirely or partly) on their land. The government allocated an additional £44.4 million to local authorities to continue the maintenance and inspection of public and privately owned coal tips.

In November 2023, it was reported that the "Disused Mine and Quarry Tips (Wales) Bill" would be introduced to the Senedd by 2024, after being developed over several years.

=== Recent history ===
In the October 2024 United Kingdom budget, the UK Government pledged £25 million to coal tip safety in Wales.

In December 2024, the Welsh Government introduced legislation concerning coal tips. The government's Disused Mine and Quarry Tips (Wales) Bill proposes the creation of an organisation, provisionally named The Disused Tips Authority for Wales, to oversee Wales' disused coal and non-coal tips. The new organisation would be a Welsh Government sponsored body, and planned to be set up by April 2027. The authority would create and maintain an disused tip register, implement a new regulatory regime, and assess and inspect tips. With many tips being under private ownership, it would have the power to require landowners to carry out any needed repair work, and fine those that do not comply. Plaid Cymru stated the legislation was an "important step" but "not enough" and called the UK Government to pay more of the £600 million estimated cost, while the opposition Welsh Conservatives welcomed the proposal.

On 14 December 2024, Deputy First Minister of Wales, Huw Irranca-Davies, stated that £100 million would be invested into coal tip safety in the 2021–2026 Senedd term. This allocated funding comprises the £65 million already committed by the Welsh Government, £25 million from the UK Government allocated for 2025–26, and an additional £12 million from the Welsh Government.

== List of coal tips ==
By July 2020, 2,144 coal tips were identified in Wales, mostly in the South Wales Valleys, with 294 deemed high-risk at the time. Of them, 73% were privately owned, and 27% publicly owned by councils, Natural Resources Wales (NRW) or the Coal Authority (now Mining Remediation Authority). In October 2021, the total number was increased to 2,456 following the Welsh Government publishing the list of the sites and the principal area of Wales they are located in. However they refused to publish their exact locations, until they are shared with councils and further work is done. 327 of these tips were classed as high-risk. By 2024, it was increased to 2,573 disused coal tips in Wales.

By 2020, the Coal Authority had 24 coal tips in Wales under its management while NRW had 112, of which one in Treherbert was classed as "high risk" at the time, and was co-monitored with the Authority.

In 2021, the 2,456 sites were categorised A–D, with those in C and D classed as "higher risk", therefore a potential to cause a risk to safety, although not an imminent or immediate threat.

The full categorisation is as follows:

- Category R tip – Very unlikely potential to impact public safety. Potential for removal or levelling of tip to be built over.
- Category A tip – Very unlikely potential to impact public safety.
- Category B tip – Unlikely potential to impact public safety.
- Category C tip – Potential to impact public safety. Annual inspection.
- Category D tip – Potential to impact public safety. Bi-annual inspection.

The Coal Authority has been given the responsibility to perform inspections.

The data below is as of 14 November 2023, recording a total 2,566 tips. There are no recorded disused coal tips in Ceredigion, Conwy, Denbighshire, Gwynedd, Newport or the Vale of Glamorgan.

=== By principal area ===
Principal area	Coal tip sites	Category				
Principal area	Coal tip sites	R*	A	B	C	D
Blaenau Gwent	128	9	63	38	13	5
Bridgend	179	6	94	37	36	6
Caerphilly	206	8	81	66	44	7
Cardiff	24	—	8	14	1	1
Carmarthenshire	170	53	58	58	1	—
Ceredigion	—	—	—	—	—	—
Conwy	—	—	—	—	—	—
Denbighshire	—	—	—	—	—	—
Flintshire	65	6	40	19	—	—
Gwynedd	—	—	—	—	—	—
Isle of Anglesey	10	—	7	3	—	—
Merthyr Tydfil	122	1	31	31	44	15
Monmouthshire	27	—	8	7	10	2
Neath Port Talbot	617	30	385	161	28	13
Newport	—	—	—	—	—	—
Pembrokeshire	61	—	54	6	1	—
Powys	30	3	6	20	1	0
Rhondda Cynon Taf	327	48	93	107	50	29
Swansea	209	42	125	37	5	—
Torfaen	175	10	49	81	30	5
Vale of Glamorgan	—	—	—	—	—	—
Wrexham	216	85	107	21	3	—
Total	2566	301	1209	706	267	83

=== By management body ===
==== Coal Authority ====
In January 2020, the Coal Authority (now Mining Remediation Authority) released a list of all the 39 coal tips they manage in Great Britain, with 24 being in Wales, 10 in England and 5 in Scotland. Those in Wales are listed below:

Coal Authority-managed coal tips in Wales
Tip name	Principal area	Coordinates
Aber	Bridgend	51.605932°N 3.539261°W
Putwell Farm	Rhondda Cynon Taf	51.634737°N 3.314819°W
Merthyr Vale - Aberfan	Merthyr Tydfil	51.696349°N 3.352778°W
Avon	Neath Port Talbot	51.656469°N 3.593018°W
Blaenant	Monmouthshire	51.802347°N 3.151455°W
Glenrhondda 220	Rhondda Cynon Taf	51.671209°N 3.566781°W
Glenrhondda 469	Rhondda Cynon Taf	51.676002°N 3.564777°W
Tydraw 221	Rhondda Cynon Taf	51.676765°N 3.554679°W
Tydraw 468	Rhondda Cynon Taf	51.673652°N 3.558911°W
Blaenmelyn	Torfaen	51.750232°N 3.100875°W
Caerau	Bridgend	51.638736°N 3.640086°W
Castle	Merthyr Tydfil	51.711613°N 3.354681°W
Cnwc	Merthyr Tydfil	51.702474°N 3.367432°W
Cwmtillery	Blaenau Gwent	51.752584°N 3.137150°W
Llanover	Caerphilly	51.699916°N 3.189369°W
Marine 567	Blaenau Gwent / Caerphilly	51.732277°N 3.190218°W
Marine 568	Blaenau Gwent	51.732365°N 3.181532°W
Marine 569	Blaenau Gwent	51.733278°N 3.180108°W
Mynydd Corrwg Fechan	Neath Port Talbot	51.691205°N 3.617387°W
North Rhondda	Neath Port Talbot	51.694919°N 3.608838°W
Ogmore Washery / Rhondda Main	Bridgend	51.585372°N 3.529906°W
South Griffin	Blaenau Gwent	51.750560°N 3.160278°W
Tymawr	Rhondda Cynon Taf	51.612654°N 3.358953°W
Marine 570	Blaenau Gwent	51.729697°N 3.178567°W

== Management ==
Coal tip safety is devolved to Wales, therefore the responsibility of the Welsh Government. The legislation setting the framework for coal tip safety is the "Mines and Quarries (Tips) Act 1969", which was passed when Wales had a coal mining industry.

The Welsh Government describes the system under the 1969 act to be "permissive", where powers to tackle the tips may "only [be used] where it appears to a local authority" that there is a public danger due to instability of the tips. Therefore, the Welsh Government states that local authorities cannot take proactive measures before a risk of danger is apparent.

The Welsh Government has called on the UK Government to provide funding to review the coal tips, as the government argued they were created before devolution. The UK Government stated it does not plan to provide the £500–600 million over 10–15 years that the Welsh Government was requesting to secure 1,200 Welsh coal tips. The UK Government stated, as it is a devolved matter, it shouldn't be expected that the UK Government would provide additional funding for it. As a result of the lack of UK funding, Welsh finance minister, stated the Welsh Government would have to divert funding from education, transport, housing and other devolved matters.

The Coal Authority, a UK government department, oversees the inspection and safety of the sites.
