= Western Mostyn Colliery Company =

Welsh coal company

The Western Mostyn Colliery Company was formed in 1873 with the purpose of investigating the potential of a coal mine at Point of Ayr, in Flintshire, Wales.

They were the second company to attempt borings at the site, after the Prestatyn Coal Company tried in 1865.

A shaft 100 yards (91 m) deep was sunk; however, the heading that was driven from this shaft hit a fault and the project was abandoned once more.
