= Margaret Mostyn =

English carmelite

Margaret of Jesus OCD
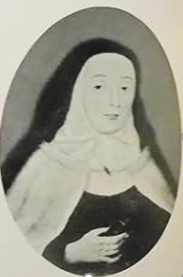
- Born: Margaret Mostyn; 8 December 1625; Talacre, Flintshire, Wales
- Died: 29 August 1679 (aged 53); Lier, Antwerp, Belgium

Margaret Mostyn (8 December 1625 – 29 August 1679), religious name Margaret of Jesus, was an English Discalced Carmelite and prioress of the Lierre Carmel from 1654 until her death. She is remembered for her devotion to the Virgin Mary and for a series of visions that she experienced throughout her life.

== Early life and vocation ==
Margaret Mostyn was one of four sisters and three brothers, born to John Mostyn Esq of Talacre Hall and Anne Fox, daughter of Henry Fox of Hurst. Her youngest brother, Edward Mostyn, became the first baronet of the family in 1670.

From an early age, Mostyn was brought up and educated by her grandmother. From as young as six, she is described as showing a spiritual temperament, spending long hours gazing at religious pictures and was reported as often being "favoured with the visible presence of her angel guardian". In her teens, she expressed a desire to follow a monastic vocation, but was dissuaded by her grandmother who asked Margaret to stay and look after her. Following the death of her grandmother, Mostyn returned to live with her mother. After a period of denying her growing sense of vocation, Margaret described experiencing a vision of the Virgin Mary and St. Teresa of Avila, whilst walking in the garden at home. Mostyn reports Mary as saying: "My child, if you will be happy, follow your first vocation – St. Teresa will help you". She entered the religious life, along with her sister Elizabeth (in religion Sister Ursula), around one year later.

== Religious life ==
On account of the anti-Catholic sentiment in England at the time, the sisters opted to join the Carmel in Antwerp, Belgium. Following a dangerous and eventful journey via Weymouth and Le Havre, the two sisters, accompanied by their brother Edward, arrived in Antwerp on 10 August 1644 and were received by the prioress of the Antwerp Carmel, Ann of the Ascension. Both Margaret and Ursula were invested on the Feast of Saint Lawrence by the Bishop of Antwerp, Gasper Nemius.

At first, Margaret reportedly found the austerity of the order difficult and prayer challenging and often dull. She also developed doubts about the authenticity of her vocation shortly before her solemn profession, but describes a vision of Christ that put her mind at ease over the validity of her decision to join the order. She made her solemn profession on St Clare's day, 12 August 1645. During communion she reported having a vision of Mary "inspiring her to become her slave by voluntarily renouncing all satisfaction she might feel in anything she did".

After four years in Antwerp, Mostyn and 11 other nuns left the Convent on 26 August 1648 and founded a new Carmel in the town of Lierre. Margaret was unwilling to leave Antwerp at first, but was encouraged by a vision of Mary that told her "Lierre was the directed way for her to heaven". Following a short period in buildings belonging to the neighbouring Abbey of Bernadine Dames called "Nazareth", the community bought their own premises in Lierre and moved in during the summer of 1651.

After a period serving as Mistress of Novices, Mostyn was elected as sub-prioress of the community in 1654, three years after the inauguration of the new foundation. A year later, at the third election after the beginning of the Foundation, she was unanimously elected as prioress. After the declaration of the result by the local bishop, it is reported that Margaret "humbly besought his lordship not to confirm the election, alleging many reasons, and want of abilities". As prioress, Mostyn gained a reputation for humility, never shirking any observance, and performing the lowliest of the jobs in the community. By explanation, Margaret noted that "it would be a strange thing to see a God become so little and humble and not to strive to imitate Him".

Margaret remained as prioress of the Lierre community for 24 years until her death. She was succeeded by her sister, Ursula.

== Visions and condolences ==
Margaret described a series of visions she experienced throughout her life, many of which she reported at the request of her confessor at the Carmel, Canon Edmund Bedingfeld. Margaret describes these experiences as being extremely vivid, often lasting many hours. The majority were of the Virgin Mary, though Margaret also often experienced visions of the Infant Christ, St Teresa and other saints, as well as reporting hearing "heavenly music". Initially Margaret was concerned that these visions were the result of hallucination or invention, but later in life came to accept them as genuine. She also wrote of being tormented by demons a number of times, including one haunting lasting some months, and is reported to have borne the physical marks of this torment.

== Death ==
Mostyn became ill on the feast of St Lawrence, 9 August 1679, and deteriorated in health until her death on 29 August 1679. On her deathbed, she received the last rites, and requested to be buried in the poorest habit in the house. After blessing each member of the community, it is reported that she predicted the hour of her death, counting the hours in the early morning until her death at 07 am.

Following her death, many people came to the convent and begged pieces of her habit. A series of miraculous events were reported following her death, including that of the convent being filled with an "odoriferous and heavenly fragrance" on the first anniversary of her profession. It was also reported her corpse showed no signs of decay following a flooding of the crypt two and a half years after her death. A fellow Carmelite of the same community, Anna Maria of St. Joseph, described being cured following her intercession to Mother Margaret during a grave illness.
