= Roger Mostyn (MP, born 1567) =

Welsh politician

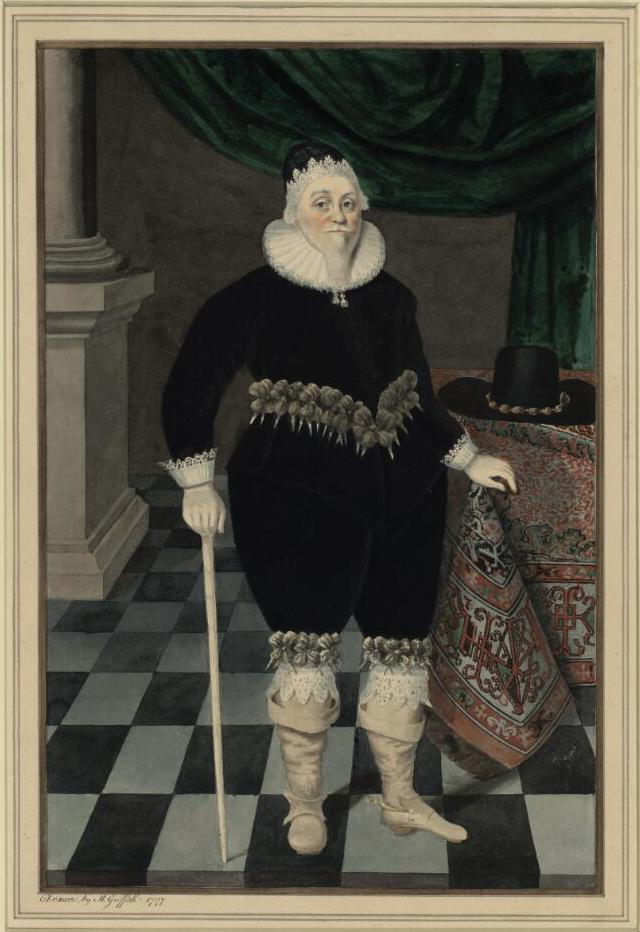
Sir Roger Mostyn

Sir Roger Mostyn (1567 – 18 August 1642) was an English politician who sat in the House of Commons from 1621 to 1622.

Mostyn was the eldest surviving son of Sir Thomas Mostyn of Mostyn. His father was MP for Flintshire in 1577. He matriculated at Brasenose College, Oxford, on 8 May 1584, aged 16, and was admitted at Lincoln's Inn in 1588. He was knighted on 23 May 1606 and succeeded his father on 21 February 1618.

He was appointed to sit as a justice of the peace for Flintshire from 1601 to his death and for Caernarvonshire from 1621 to his death. He was High Sheriff of Flintshire for 1608–09.

In 1602 purchased a 13-year lease of Mostyn Colliery for £70 and immediately began a programme of expansion. He was knighted on 23 May 1606. By 1616 he had three pits on the colliery site and by 1619 the colliery was worth in the region of £700 annually to the Mostyn family, which suggests a fairly substantial output.

In 1621, Mostyn was elected member of parliament for Flintshire.

Mostyn died at the age of 75 and was buried at Whiteford. He had married Mary, the daughter of Sir John Wynn, 1st Baronet of Gwydir, Llanrwst, Caernarvonshire and had 6 sons and 2 daughters. He was the grandfather of Sir Roger Mostyn, 1st Baronet.

Parliament of England
Preceded by Robert Ravenscroft	Member of Parliament for Flintshire; 1621–1622	Succeeded by Sir John Hanmer, 1st Baronet
