= Talacre =

Village in Flintshire, Wales

Coordinates: 53.35117°N 3.31911°W

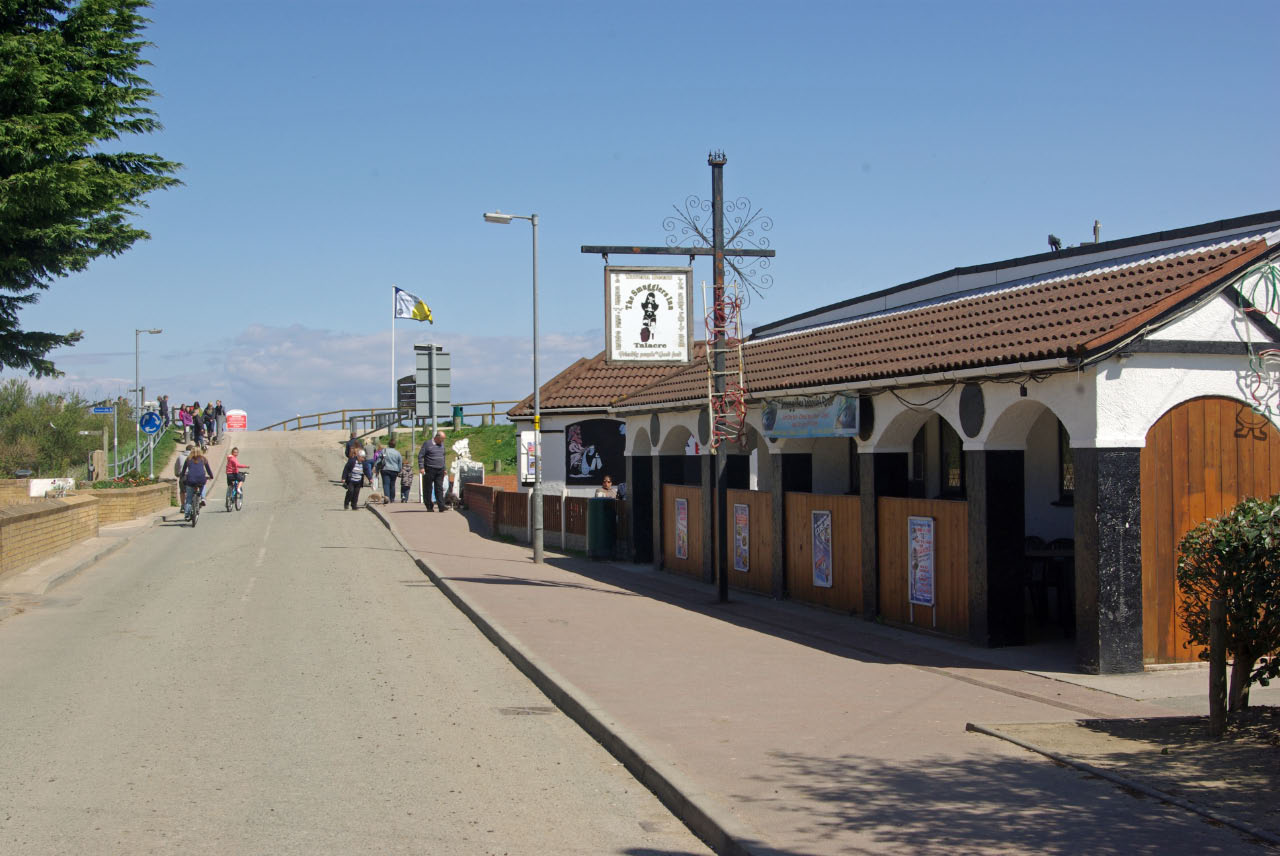
- The Smugglers Inn, a pub along the village's Station Road in 2010.

- Location within Flintshire
- Population: 347
- OS grid reference: SJ122846
- Principal area: Flintshire
- Country: Wales
- Sovereign state: United Kingdom
- Post town: HOLYWELL
- Postcode district: CH8
- Dialling code: 01745
- Police: North Wales
- Fire: North Wales
- Ambulance: Welsh
- UK Parliament: Clwyd East
- Senedd Cymru – Welsh Parliament: Delyn

Talacre is a village in Flintshire on the north coast of Wales in the community of Llanasa and the electoral ward of Ffynnongroyw, and is the northernmost mainland settlement in Wales. The village itself has a population of 347 as of the 2011 census.

It is near Point of Ayr on the west side of the River Dee estuary and has a sandy beach with dunes and large holiday caravan parks adjacent. The hills of the Clwydian Range behind the village form the eastern boundary of the Vale of Clwyd. The name Talacre is a combination of the Welsh words tal [tal] "end" and acrau [ˈakraɨ̯] "acres", which in the dialect of north-east Wales is pronounced acre [ˈakrɛ]. This has led to the local English pronunciation /təˈlækrə/. Some sources claim the English version is properly pronounced /tæˈlækreɪ, -ri/.

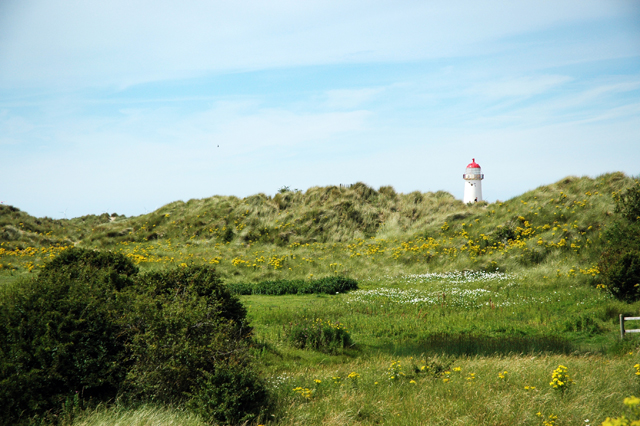
A view of Talacre lighthouse

The village is probably most popular for the lighthouse on the nearby beach, the Talacre Beach Resort a short walk away from the Presthaven Sands holiday park and its multiple arcades. The lighthouse has been noted for numerous ghostly sightings, people claiming to see a figure wearing old fashioned lighthouse keeper clothes and standing in front of the glass dome of the abandoned lighthouse. The lighthouse was featured in popular British television drama Skins, in the episode "Skins Pure".

Talacre was used by the armed forces during the Second World War as an aircraft firing range. Fighters flew over the remote village every day, shooting at wooden targets in the dunes and at drogues towed by aircraft. It was also used for testing new devices such as 'window,' the anti-radar foil that, on occasion, covered the whole village with silver.

During the Second World War, Talacre was also transformed into a refuge for evacuees from Liverpool. Families seeking safety and refuge from the Blitz lived in quickly constructed huts.

== Talacre Abbey (Westbury Castle) ==
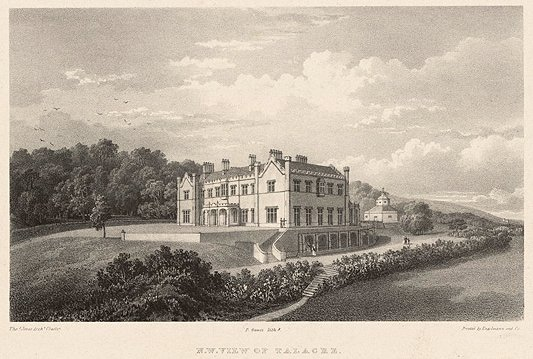
Talacre Hall, 1820s; Gauci, P., lithographer

The Talacre estate (Talacre Abbey) and Talacre Hall, built in 1829, were the home of the Mostyn baronets of Talacre. The Carmelite Margaret Mostyn grew up on the estate in the early 1600s. In 1919 the Mostyn family sold the estate by auction and in 1921 it was occupied by a community of Benedictine nuns, who moved out in 1988. The main hall, a grade II* listed building, now functions as a private house again, but was renamed Westbury Castle.

== Railways ==
The village was served by Talacre railway station on the North Wales Coast Line until it was closed in 1966.
