= Wrexham and District Electric Tramways =

Former tram company operating trams in Wrexham until 1927

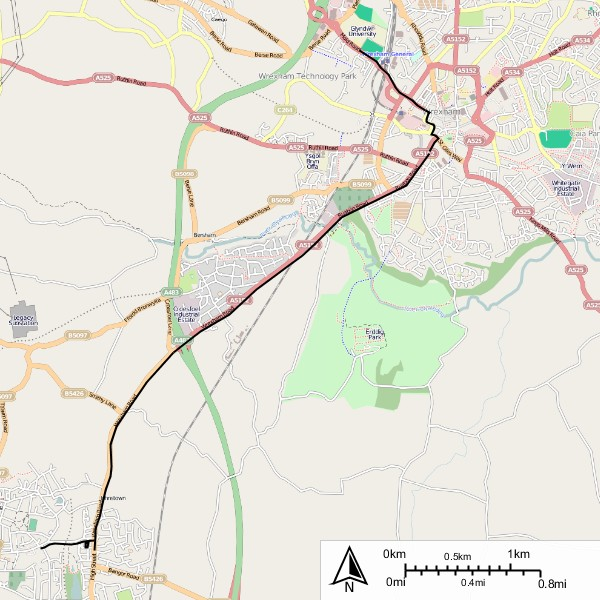
- Map of the route of the Wrexham and District Electric Tramways

Operation
- Locale: Wrexham
- Open: 4 April 1903
- Close: 31 March 1927
- Status: Closed

Infrastructure
- Track gauge: 3 ft 6 in (1,067 mm)
- Propulsion system: Electric
- Depots: Maelor Road, Johnstown
- Stock: 10 cars

Statistics
- Track length (total): 6.16 miles (9.91 km)
- Route length: 4.44 miles (7.15 km)

Wrexham and District Electric Tramways was a company that operated an electric tramway service in Wrexham, Wales between 1903 and 1914 when it was renamed Wrexham and District Transport Company Limited. Trams continued to operate until 1927.

== History ==
Tramways in Wrexham started in October 1876 with trams hauled by horses when a single line operated between New Inn, Johnstown to the toll bar on the outskirts of Wrexham. On 1 November 1876 this toll bar was removed and the line was extended to the city centre.

The company was acquired in 1900 by Wrexham and District Electric Tramways, a company set up by the British Electric Traction group. The horse-drawn service was withdrawn in 1901 to enable them to relay the line in 3'6" gauge and electrify it. The work was carried out by Dick, Kerr & Co. Following an inspection by Lt Col. Sir Horatio Arthur Yorke, from the Board of Trade, services started on 4 April 1903.

A new depot was provided at Johnstown, at the corner of Offa Street and Maelor Road, constructed by Jenkins & Jones of Johnstown of Ruabon brick. The depot survived long after the closure of the tramway, one subsequent use being a bus garage for the Crosville Company. It was finally demolished sometime between 2005 and 2010.

Electricity at 550V was obtained from the Wrexham Corporation power station in Willow Road. A 21-year agreement was put in place at the opening of the tramway for the rates at which the company would be charged for its use of power. Drivers were encouraged to operate economic driving practices to minimise the expense to the company. When this agreement expired, the company was forced into an annual contract with the prospect of yearly increases in the unit charge.

The service was extended on 26 May 1903 past Wrexham GWR railway station to the Turf Hotel. From Johnstown the line was taken into the new development at the west of the Wrexham-Ruabon road, reaching Duke Street, Rhosllannerchrugog by the end of 1904. An extension to Ruabon had been authorised, but was never built.

In 1912 the company started experimenting with bus operation and soon realised that this was where most of the profits were going to be made. In recognition of this in 1914 the company changed its name to Wrexham and District Transport Company Limited. However, any plans for expansion of bus services were put on hold with the outbreak of the First World War in the same year and the motor buses that the company had acquired were requisitioned by the armed forces.

After the war, the company suffered from competition as the military authorities disposed of much surplus equipment including motor buses and Wrexham Council issued hackney licences freely to anyone requesting them.

== Fleet ==
There were 10 tramcars built by Brush Electrical Engineering Company of Loughborough. The livery was red and cream. The vehicles could seat 26 on the upper deck and 20 inside on the lower deck.

Two of the tram bodies were rescued, having been used as garden sheds since closure and remain in storage at Wrexham Council's storage site at Bersham Colliery,

== Closure ==
The system closed on 31 March 1927.
