= Point of Ayr Lighthouse =

Former lighthouse in Flintshire, Wales

Point of Ayr Lighthouse Talacre Lighthouse
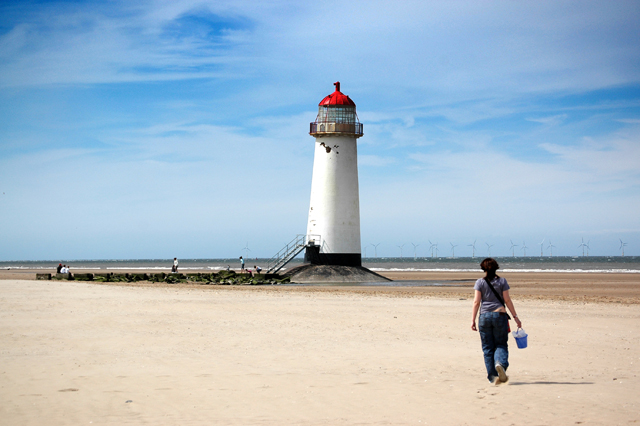
- Point of Ayr lighthouse, at Talacre beach
- Location: Talacre; Wales; United Kingdom
- OS grid: SJ 121 853
- Coordinates: 53.357044°N 3.322174°W

Tower
- Constructed: 1776
- Construction: brick tower
- Height: 18 metres (59 ft)
- Shape: tapered cylindrical tower with balcony and lantern
- Markings: white tower, black lantern, red lantern dome
- Heritage: Grade II listed building, National Monument of Wales

Light
- Deactivated: 1844

The Point of Ayr Lighthouse, also known as the Talacre Lighthouse, is a Grade II listed building situated on the north coast of Wales, on the Point of Ayr, near the village of Talacre.

Chester Lighthouse Act 1776
- Act of Parliament
- Parliament of Great Britain
- Long title: An Act for erecting a Lighthouse or Lighthouses, and Land Marks, in or near the Port of Chester; and for placing Buoys upon the Banks and Shoals leading into and in the said Port; and for regulating of Pilots and Persons towing or tracking of Vessels to and from the City of Chester; and for fixing the Rates payable for the same respectively.
- Citation: 16 Geo. 3. c. 61
- Territorial extent: Great Britain

Dates
- Royal assent: 21 May 1776
- Commencement: 26 October 1775 (Note: Start of session.)
Other legislation
Amended by	Pilotage Orders Confirmation (No. 2) Act 1922

Status: Amended

Text of statute as originally enacted

== History ==
It was authorised by the Chester Lighthouse Act 1776 (16 Geo. 3. c. 61) and built in 1776 by a trust of the Mayor, Recorder and Aldermen of Chester to warn ships entering between the Dee and the Mersey Estuary. It was replaced by a pile light and was decommissioned in 1844. It is now a privately owned property.

The lighthouse was listed for sale in 2011 by then owner James McAllister, along with two acres of land, for £100,000. It was eventually sold in April 2012 for £90,000 to a private couple who continue to own the property. Two alleged incidents have been reported by Wales Online.

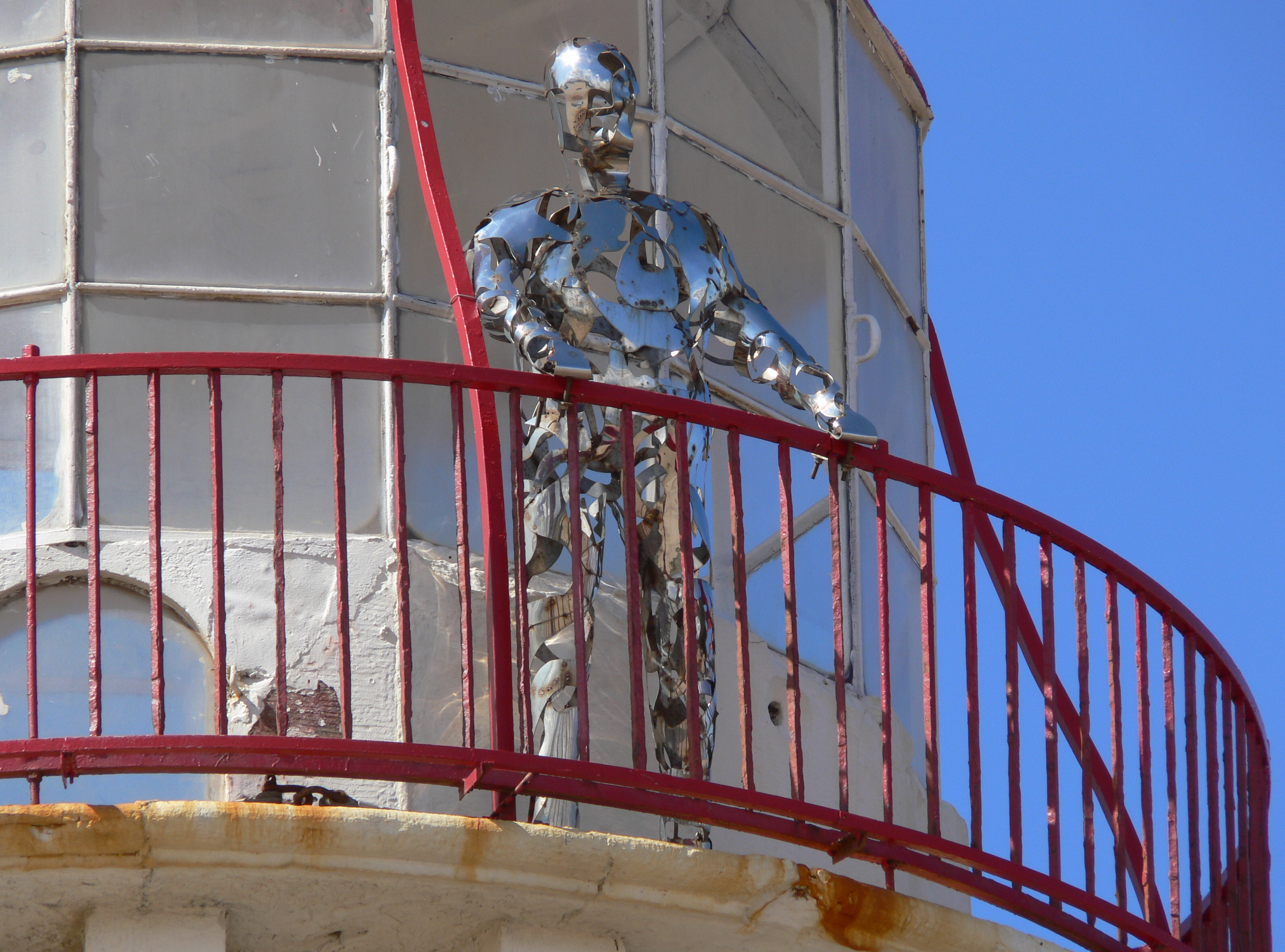
The Keeper

In 2009, the BBC reported that planning permission had been sought to erect a "human sculpture" inspired by the reported ghostly sightings on the lighthouse balcony. This application was made by then owner James McAllister who intended it to serve as a "serious art installation". Local artist Angela Smith was contracted to design the 7 foot stainless steel ‘lighthouse keeper’ with the initial planning permission being approved for a three-year period. Permission was not sought to retain the structure after this point and the sculpture was relocated.

Drone video of lighthouse

In 2007 the lighthouse was damaged by storms which resulted in the metal steps leading to the building becoming dislocated and also resulted structural damage with a hole being created in the base according to the BBC. The cost of repairs was covered by the owners of a local caravan park who were involved in the ownership of the lighthouse at the time. The lighthouse featured in the background in a 2011 TV advertisement by paint manufacturer Dulux. The advertisement was designed to mark the 50th anniversary of the first appearance of their Old English Sheepdog mascot.

== See also ==
- List of lighthouses in Wales
