= Flintshire Coalfield =

Coalfield in north Wales

Coordinates: 53.2108°N 3.1232°W

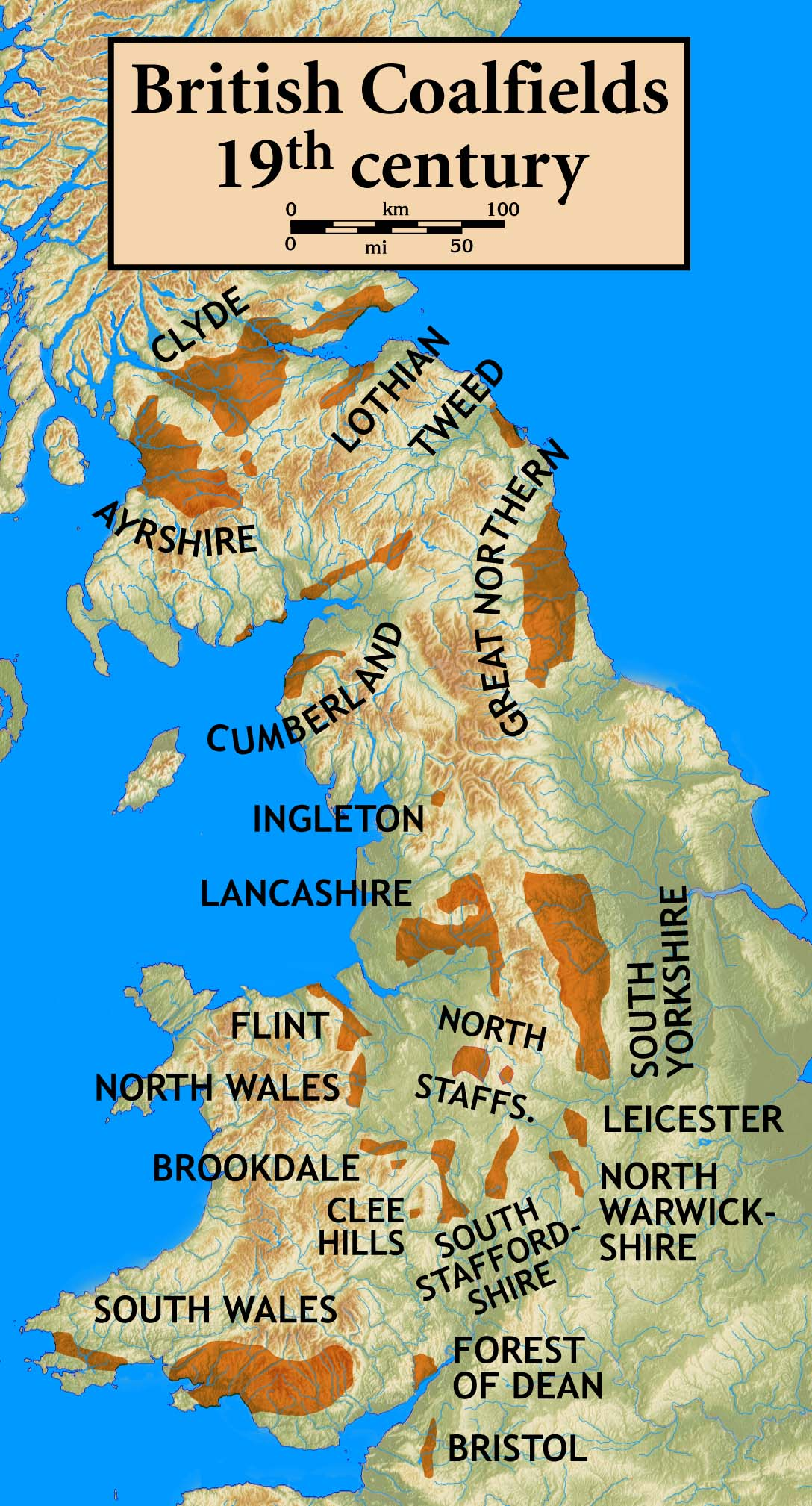
The Flintshire Coalfield is labelled as "Flint"

The Flintshire Coalfield in north-east Wales is one of the smaller British coalfields. It is in the county of Flintshire and extends from the Point of Ayr in the north, along the Dee Estuary through Connah's Quay to Caergwrle in the south. A small part extends onto the Wirral i.e. English coast of the estuary at Neston, Cheshire which was the site of a coalmine for a period. The coal-bearing strata continue southwards of Caergwrle as the Denbighshire Coalfield. Together the two coalfields are known as the North Wales Coalfield.

== Geology ==
Several coal seams are named in the sequence. Some seams are absent in the northern part of the coalfield and are labelled as (S) whilst the others occur across the coalfield as a whole. The Chwarelau Seam which appears only in the north actually occurs within the underlying Millstone Grit sequence rather than the Coal Measures proper. The seams are listed stratigraphically with the uppermost (youngest) at the head of the list and the lowermost (oldest) at the foot. Local names are shown in brackets.

Within the Pennine Middle Coal Measures Group:
- Upper Main (S)
- Pontybodkin Mountain (S)
- Tryddyn Half-Yard (S)
- Drowsell (Massey)
- Powell (Bind)(Bi)
- Hollin (Cannel)(H)
- Crank (Three Quarter)(C)(S)
- Quaker (Brassey) (B)(S)
- Black Bed (Rough)(R)
- Main (Five Yard)(M)
- Lower Bench (Three Yard)(LB)
- Crown (Mostyn Two Yard)(Diamond)

Within the Pennine Lower Coal Measures Group:
- Upper Red (Durdog)(King)(K)
- Lower Red (Yard)(Cannel)(C)
- Cannel (Stone)
- Stone (divides into Wall (W) and Bench (BC)in south)(Hard Five Quarter)
- Nant (Badger)(N)
- Ruabon Yard (Yard)(Soft Five Quarter)(Y)
- Premier (Bychton Two Yard)(P)
- Llwyneinion Half Yard (Picton Three Quarter)

Within the Gwespyr Sandstone Formation of the Millstone Grit Group:
- Chwarelau (N) (Little Coal)
