= Bersham Colliery =

Former coal mine in Wrexham, Wales

Coordinates: 53.026571°N 3.023505°W

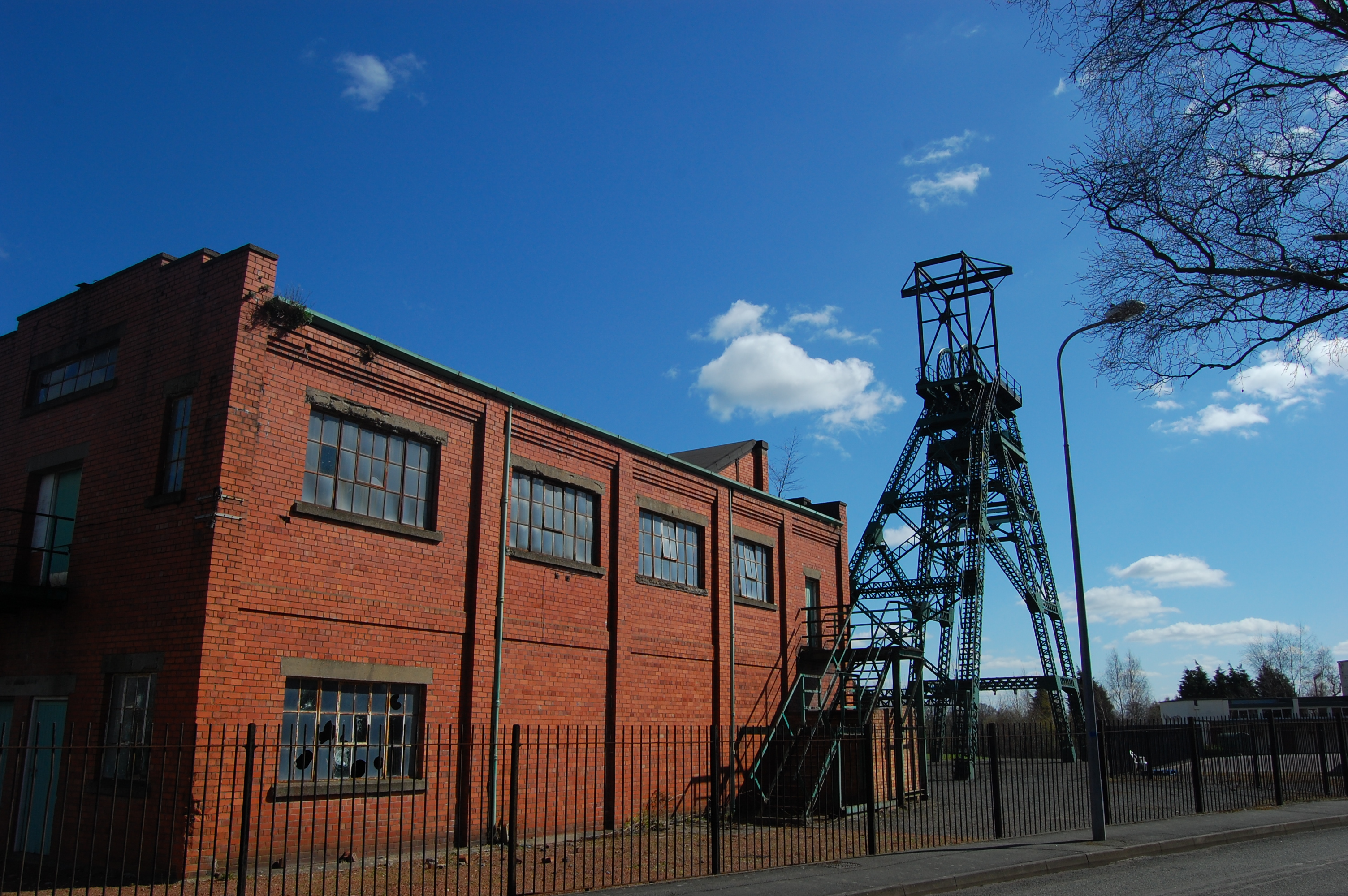
- The Engine House and Winding Gear at Bersham
- Interactive map of Bersham Colliery
- Location: Rhostyllen, Denbighshire, later Clwyd (now Wrexham), Wales
- Products: Coal
- Opened: 1864
- Active: 1871–1986
- Closed: 1986
- Company: British Coal

Bersham Colliery was a large coal mine located near Rhostyllen in Wrexham, Wales. The mine accessed seams found in the Denbighshire Coalfield.

== History ==
The Wrexham area in the 19th Century was highly industrialised. At the peak there were 38 different collieries operating in the area, each producing coal totalling over 2.5 million tonnes annually to the numerous brickworks and steelworks in the area, including Brymbo Steel Works and Shotton Steel Works.

=== 19th century ===
When the colliery first opened it was named Glan-yr-Afon (English: Riverside) Colliery. Operated by Bersham Coal Company, the first shaft was sunk in 1864 on the site of a brickworks immediately adjacent to the Shrewsbury to Chester railway line, however due to difficulties the pit did not reach the main coal seams and the site was left abandoned until 1871 when the pit was deepened by new owners, the Barnes family of Liverpool; coal production started in 1874 with two shafts; No.1 at a diameter of 10 feet and depth of 420 yards, and No.2 shaft at a diameter of 12 feet and a depth of 421 yards.

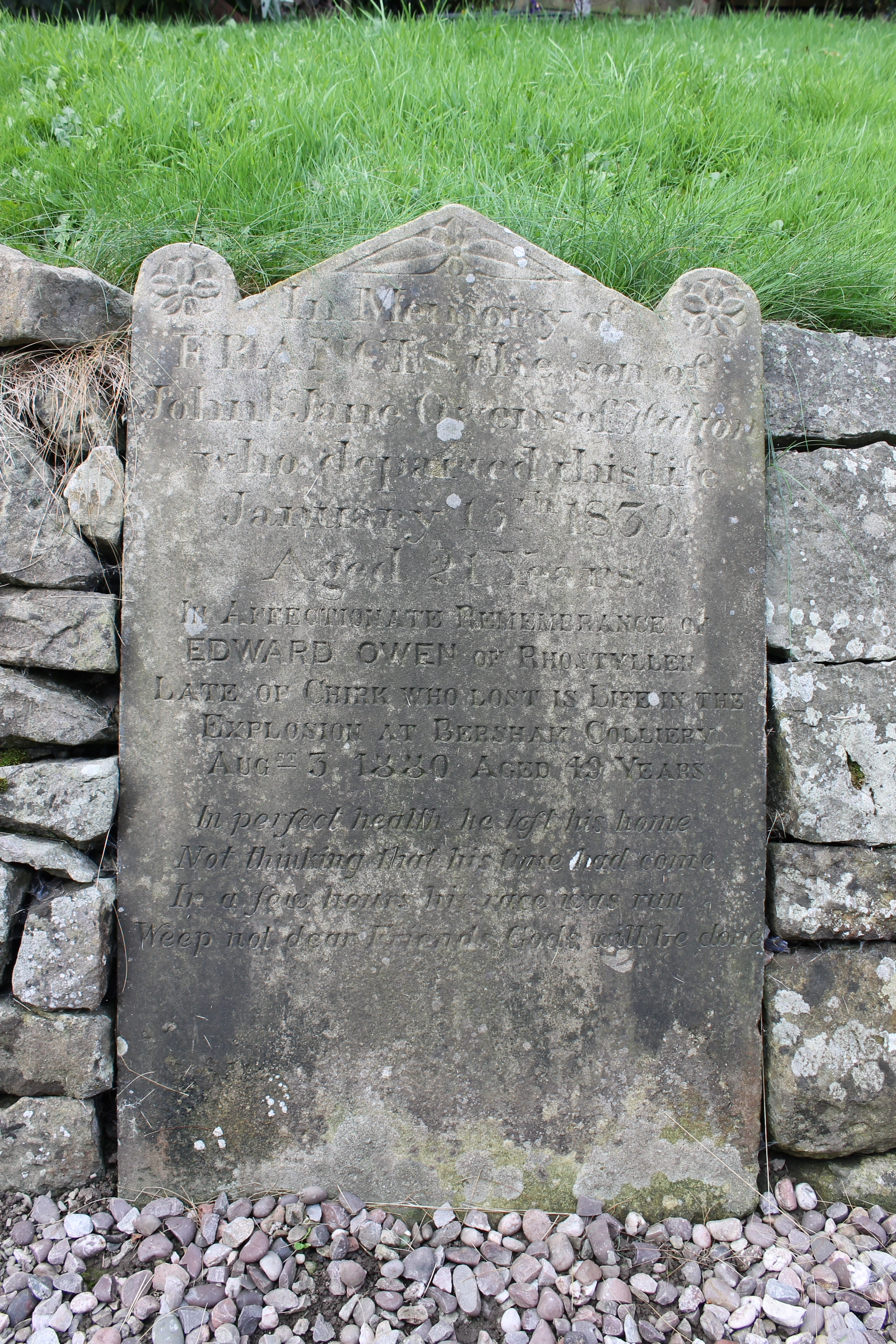
Gravestone of miner who died in the Bersham Colliery explosion August 1880. St Mary's Parish Church, Chirk

The colliery worked for six years without major incident until 1880, when a major underground explosion killed 9 men, among them the colliery manager, William Pattison. In 1896, there were 711 men working at both shafts.

=== 20th century ===
There was further growth at the colliery, with 848 men working there by 1908, and 878 by 1918. As with most mining communities, sons followed their fathers into the mines; and the local communities of Rhostyllen, Rhosllannerchrugog and Johnstown grew in size around the coal industry in the area. By 1903, the Wrexham and District Electric Tramways ran from Johnstown to Wrexham through Rhostyllen, connecting the major mining villages with Wrexham General railway station and the town centre.

Another explosion killed a number of men in 1909. This was the final major incident at Bersham, barring another in 1933, when the timber headgear burned to the ground. Replacement headgear which still stands today was purchased and moved from the nearby Gatewen Colliery at Broughton, Wrexham.

Before 1935, mining at the colliery had been done by hand, with mechanisation appearing in the mine at this time. As the miners at Bersham had no experience with the machinery, miners from other local mines that did were brought in to assist, causing friction between the two groups. Mining was difficult in Bersham, with seams less than 2 feet high, and a geological faultline, the Wrexham-Staffordshire faultline, running nearby meant that seams abruptly stopped.

In 1923, the mine employed 808 men, and this decreasing to 800 in 1945. Ownership during this time appeared to jump between Broughton & Plas Power Coal Co. Ltd and Bersham Colliery Company Ltd, with ownership changing between the two three times, with Broughton & Plas Power Coal Co. Ltd finally retaining ownership of the mine up until nationalisation in 1947.

=== Nationalisation ===
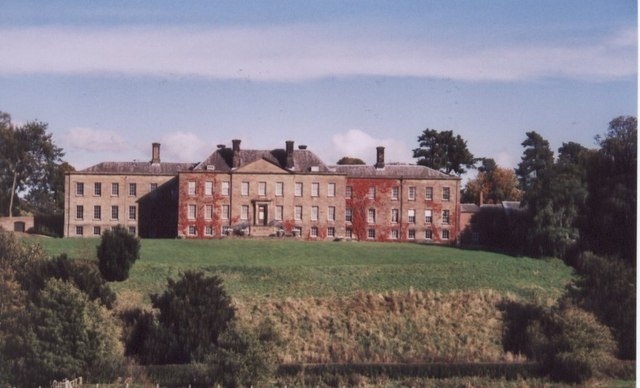
Erddig Hall

On 1 January 1947, along with the rest of the coal industry, Bersham was nationalised and placed under the control of the National Coal Board. The colliery was immediately modernised, completed in 1954 with a new block housing new pithead baths, canteen and offices designed to cater for up to 1,100 men. The pit ponies at Bersham numbering near 100, which had been underground for most, if not all of their lives, were retired in the same year and replaced with mechanical traction. The colliery reached its largest size in 1958, with 1,011 recorded at the site.

In 1961, more mechanisation was brought into the mine, including conveyor belts to convey coal to the surface faster.

With the expanding tunnels into the surrounding area, care had to be taken to avoid subsidence. To this end a large pillar of solid coal was left untouched to allow the nearby home of the Yorke Family, Erddig Hall to remain out of danger. Unfortunately this did not prevent subsidence and in 1973, subsidence of 5 feet occurred, leaving the house structurally unsound. Eventually the owner of the estate, the last Squire Yorke had to move out of Erddig and left the property to the National Trust. The National Coal Board paid the trust compensation of £120,000 to stabilise the building through underpinning.

=== Closure ===
Bersham Colliery was closed with the loss of 480 jobs in December 1986 due to unfavourable economic conditions and loss of markets. The large amounts of equipment still underground meant that salvage operations continued into 1987, however a great deal was left in place.

== Preservation ==
Most of the surface buildings were demolished shortly after with the main exceptions of the No.2 headgear with its wheel, and its engine house complete with electric winding gear. Other remaining buildings have remained as part of a small industrial estate. The site is owned by Wrexham County Borough Council. In 1999, the Shropshire Mines Trust arranged with the council to clean the site up and clean the remaining buildings with a view to create a Museum. They created the Bersham Colliery Trust to do this; however after clearing the site and moving large amounts of mining artifacts to the site, they were disbanded with a lack of local interest.

== Bersham Colliery Tip ==
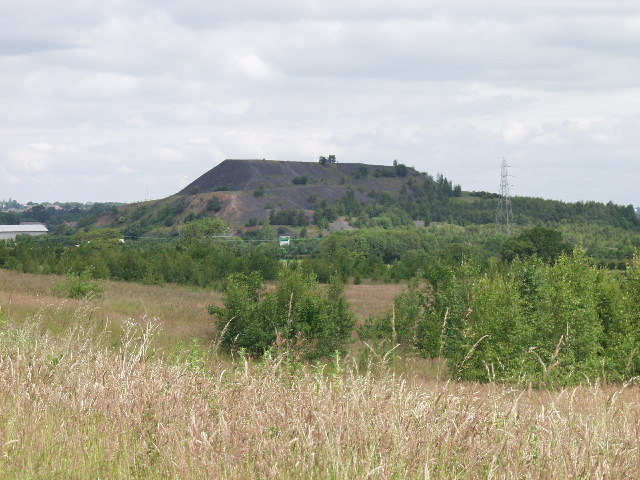
The tip created by the Colliery.

The most prominent landmark left by the colliery is that of its spoil tip, known as Bersham Tip.

In 2003, a company called Bersham Glenside Ltd announced controversial plans to remove the tip and sell it to the building industry. Wrexham County Borough Council eventually refused planning permission for this to take place, and Cadw recommended the tip remain. However, upon appeal to the Welsh Assembly Government, this decision was overturned and removal of the tip is now likely to take place.

Bersham Glenside Ltd have stated they will contribute money to the heritage of the colliery and will keep part of the tip that has become heavily wooded, closest to the colliery.

On 16 August 2021, a "Hollywood-style sign", spelling "WREXHAM", was put up on top of the tip, facing west towards to A483. The local community and wider media speculated who and why the sign was put up. Many speculated the new owners of Wrexham A.F.C., Hollywood stars Rob McElhenney and Ryan Reynolds were involved. The Hollywood pair denied involvement, so did Wrexham Council. On 20 August, the online car leasing company, Vanarama, the sponsor of the National League in which Wrexham A.F.C. play, said they were responsible for the sign. The sign was removed in early October 2021 due to a dispute with the landowners, despite calls from locals for the sign to remain.
