= Denbighshire Coalfield =

Coalfield in North Wales, United Kingdom

Coordinates: 53.0507°N 3.0094°W

The Denbighshire Coalfield in the historic county of Denbighshire in north-east Wales is one of the smaller British coalfields. It extends from near Caergwrle in the north, southwards through Wrexham, Ruabon and Rhosllannerchrugog to Chirk in the south. A small part extends into Shropshire around Oswestry. Beyond Caergwrle the coal-bearing strata continue northwards as the Flintshire Coalfield. Together the two coalfields are known as the North Wales Coalfield.

== History ==
The shallower parts of the Denbighshire Coalfield were worked extensively in the early nineteenth century, most of the coal being used in the iron industry. In the mid-nineteenth century, much deeper pits were established and a network of railways was built in the Wrexham area to transport the coal.

A report on the North Wales Coalfield in the 1950s found that the reserves of coal were running low and that in the Denbighshire Coalfield, the geology of the coal-bearing strata dipped rapidly rendering it unlikely that the coalfield could be further developed. The last deep mine to operate in the coalfield was Bersham Colliery which closed in 1986. Prior to this time, as many as 38 collieries had been in operation across the area, with a peak output in excess of 2.6 million tons, and giving employment at the height of production to some 12,000 men.

== Coal seams ==
Several coal seams are named in the sequence. All of the seams occur within the Bettisfield Formation with the exception of the Morlas which occurs in the Coed-yr-Allt Formation. The seams are listed stratigraphically with the uppermost (youngest) at the head of the list and the lowermost (oldest) at the foot.

- Morlas
- Bersham Yard Group; from Alpha (or Alpha Rider) through Beta Rider, Beta and Gamma to Delta (or Delta Bench)
- Upper Stinking
- Warras
- Lower Stinking (known as Brassy at former Moreton Hall Colliery)
- Powell
- Hollin
- Crank
- Quaker
- Main (was known as Six Foot at Quinta Colliery, Bottoms at Preesgwyn Colliery, Bind and Bench at Moreton Hall Colliery and Yard in the Oswestry area)
- Crown
- Upper Red
- Lower Red
- Cannel
- Fireclay Group (includes Stone, Half Yard, Firedamp, Bottom Four Foot and Two Foot seams)
- Nant
- Ruabon Yard
- Premier
- Llwyneinion Half Yard
- Chwarelau
