= Mostyn Colliery =

Welsh coal mine active for over 600 years until 1996

Coordinates: 53.320°N 3.263°W

Mostyn Colliery was a coal mine in Flintshire, North Wales, that was owned in the later part of its operating life by the influential Mostyn family. The colliery was located at Mostyn on the banks of the River Dee.

== Early history ==
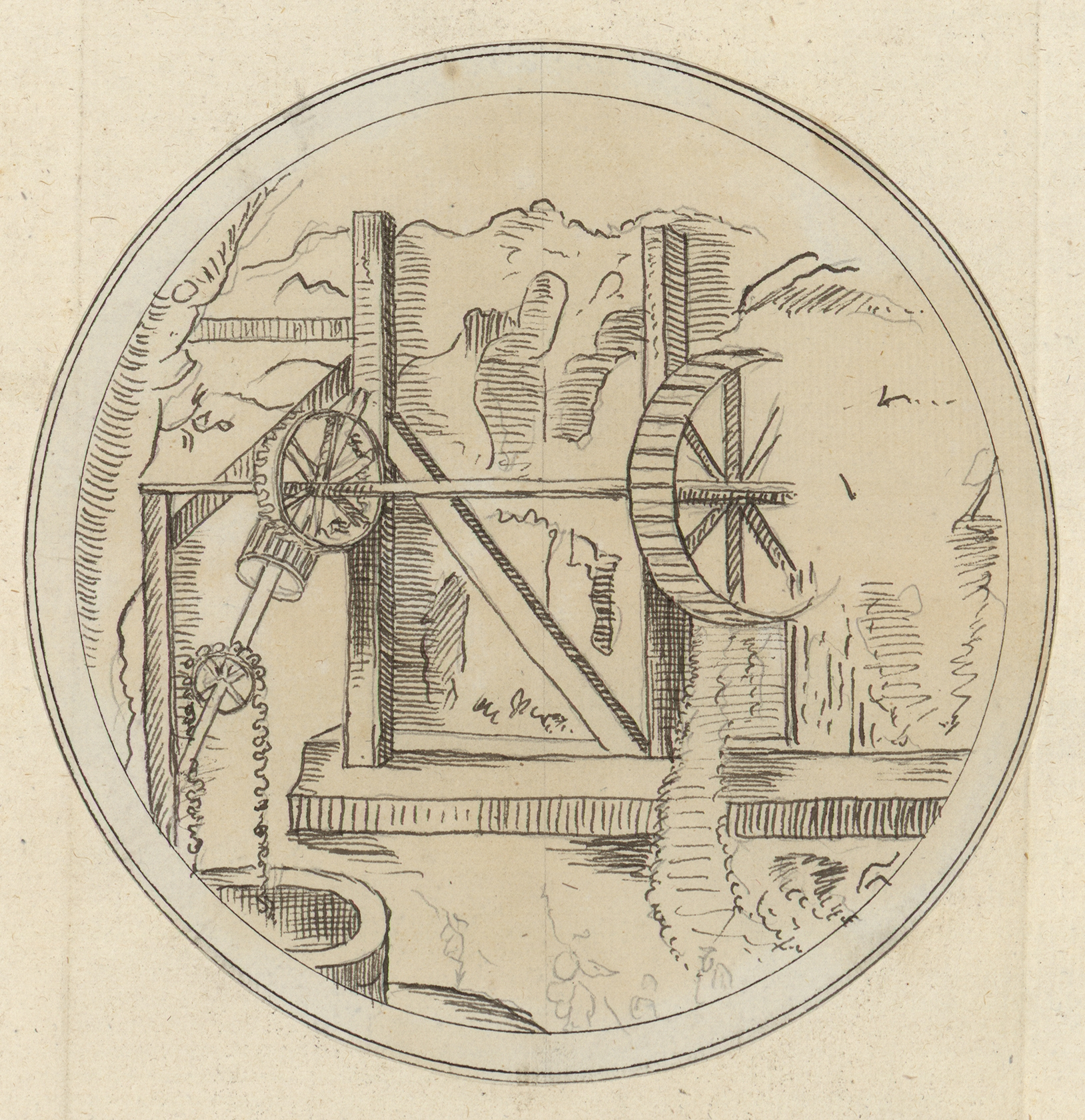
A sketch of an old engine at Mostyn Colliery, from Pennant's A Tour in Wales 1778

The Welsh writer Thomas Pennant wrote that coal mines at Mostyn were established as far back as 1261, during the reign of Edward I. Records show that in 1294, together with a stone quarry, the colliery had a value of £5 annually, and in 1423 was worth £3 6s 8d.

In the early years, coal was transported from the colliery by boats which approached the quay at high water but the changing river course meant that a partial canal was dug to ensure safe passage.

Records show that Thomas Cowper and Richard Mason of London leased Mostyn Colliery in 1594. Records suggest that by the 17th century Mostyn was possibly the largest colliery on the western seaboard of Britain and probably the most profitable on the North Wales Coalfield.

== The Mostyn Family ==
In 1602 Cowper and Mason sold a 13-year lease to Roger Mostyn for £70, beginning the colliery's association with what was to become one of North Wales' most influential families. Mostyn began a programme of expansion, and by 1616 there were three pits on the site. By 1619 the colliery was worth in the region of £700 annually to the Mostyns, which suggests a fairly substantial output.

In 1639 Roger Mostyn's successor, Sir Roger Mostyn ordered the sinking of three more deep pits. At around this time, it is noted that almost all coal shipped from Chester was entered into the city records as 'Mostyn coal'. A serious explosion occurred at the colliery in 1673. Sir Roger Mostyn gave an account of an explosion caused by firedamp on 3 February 1675. The explosion "flew to and fro over all the hollows of the work with a great wind and a continued fire, and, as it went, keeping a mighty great roaring noise on all sides". He described how the blast was heard 15 miles (24 km) away, destroyed the winding gear and felled trees. Mostyn also described how the men who were underground at the time of the blast were singed "as if they had been whipped with rods; some, that had least shelter, were carried fifteen or sixteen yards [by the blast] and beaten against the roof of the coal".

== Mostyn Coal and Iron Company ==
When an ironworks was opened to produce iron using coal from the colliery in 1802, the company was renamed the 'Mostyn Coal and Iron Company'. It was prosperous from the start.

In 1806, two explosions occurred causing the deaths of 36 men. In April 1807 a fire resulted in 26 deaths. Several families lost more than one member in the tragedy. Another explosion on 10 March 1809 caused the deaths of 22 men. The 1807 and 1809 explosions killed 50 men, created 26 widows, and left 66 children fatherless.

The average price of coal was documented by Mr Robert Anderson, in his 1839 pamphlet The Present State of the Coal Trade. He gave the average price per ton of Mostyn's 'Best Coals' as 8s 6d, with 'Second Coals' at a shilling less, showing Mostyn coal to be amongst the cheapest available in Britain.

By the 1840s, the approach to the quayside by boat had been improved and was able to take vessels of 300 tons that moved between 50,000 and 60,000 tons of coal each year.

Work started in 1843 on an embankment known locally as the 'cob' that had the dual purpose of reclaiming land from the River Dee, and providing a flood defence. The project known as the Bychan Embankment was funded by the colliery owner Lord Mostyn, and J. P. Eyton. The embankment was 1,974 yards (1,805 m) long—around 1.2 miles (1.9 km). The cost was around £4,500 and about 70 acres of land were reclaimed.

What was, at the time, believed to be one of the largest steam engine cylinders in the world was manufactured for John Lancaster in November 1848 by Haigh Foundry, in Lancashire, for installation in a direct action pumping engine at Mostyn Colliery. It was 17 feet (5.2 m) long, eight feet four inches in diameter, and weighed 22 tons. It was said to have used 30 tons of molten metal in its manufacture, and a sizable crowd of interested observers went to view the casting. Mostyn is also notable in that in 1852, it became one of the first collieries to fit an experimental 'air pump'.

== Railway ==
With the opening of the Chester and Holyhead Railway in 1847, it was only a matter of time before the coal and iron companies took advantage, with the railway passing literally within feet of the site. In 1855, sidings were constructed with access to both the colliery and the ironworks, although the colliery had had its own internal horsedrawn system since the early 18th century.

From 1872 until 1888 the Mostyn Coal & Iron Co, was owned by Joshua Lancaster.

== Closure ==
The Mostyn Coal and Iron Company went into liquidation in 1879, in no small part due to changes within the ironworks business, however the full circumstances may never be known, as much of the historical record has been lost. The lease to the colliery was sold as a going concern by the liquidator. The O.S Six-inch map of 1881, shows Hanmer Colliery at 53.31293,-3.25588, and a Copper Works and Ayton Pit where Warwick Chemicals is now.

Disaster beset the colliery in 1884 when the river broke through and completely overwhelmed the pits. The event inspired a Welsh-language song. The colliery never re-opened, despite a takeover in 1887 by a Lancashire company to form the Darwen and Mostyn Iron Company, thus ending over 620 years of coal production at Mostyn. However, by this time, serious explorations were under way at the nearby Point of Ayr site, which would ultimately become one of the last deep coal mines in Wales when it closed in 1996.
