= Prestatyn Coal Company =

Welsh coal company

The Prestatyn Coal Company was formed in 1865, by Lord Mostyn, owner of Mostyn Colliery, to investigate the possibility of a colliery at Point of Ayr, in Flintshire, Wales.

Trial borings proved successful but the project was abandoned before work could properly begin.
