= North Wales Coalfield =

Coal-rich area of the United Kingdom

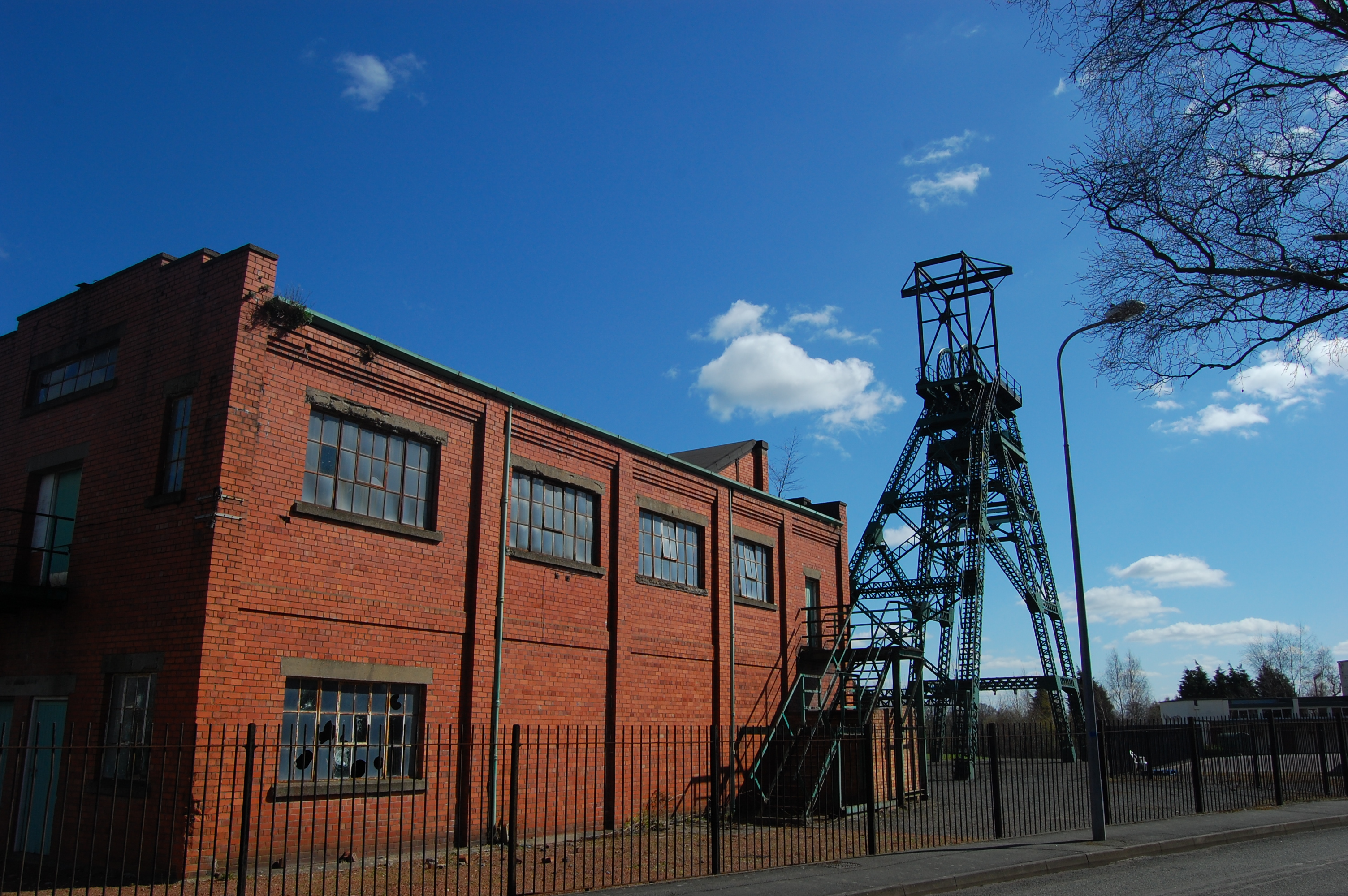
The engine house and winding gear at Bersham Colliery

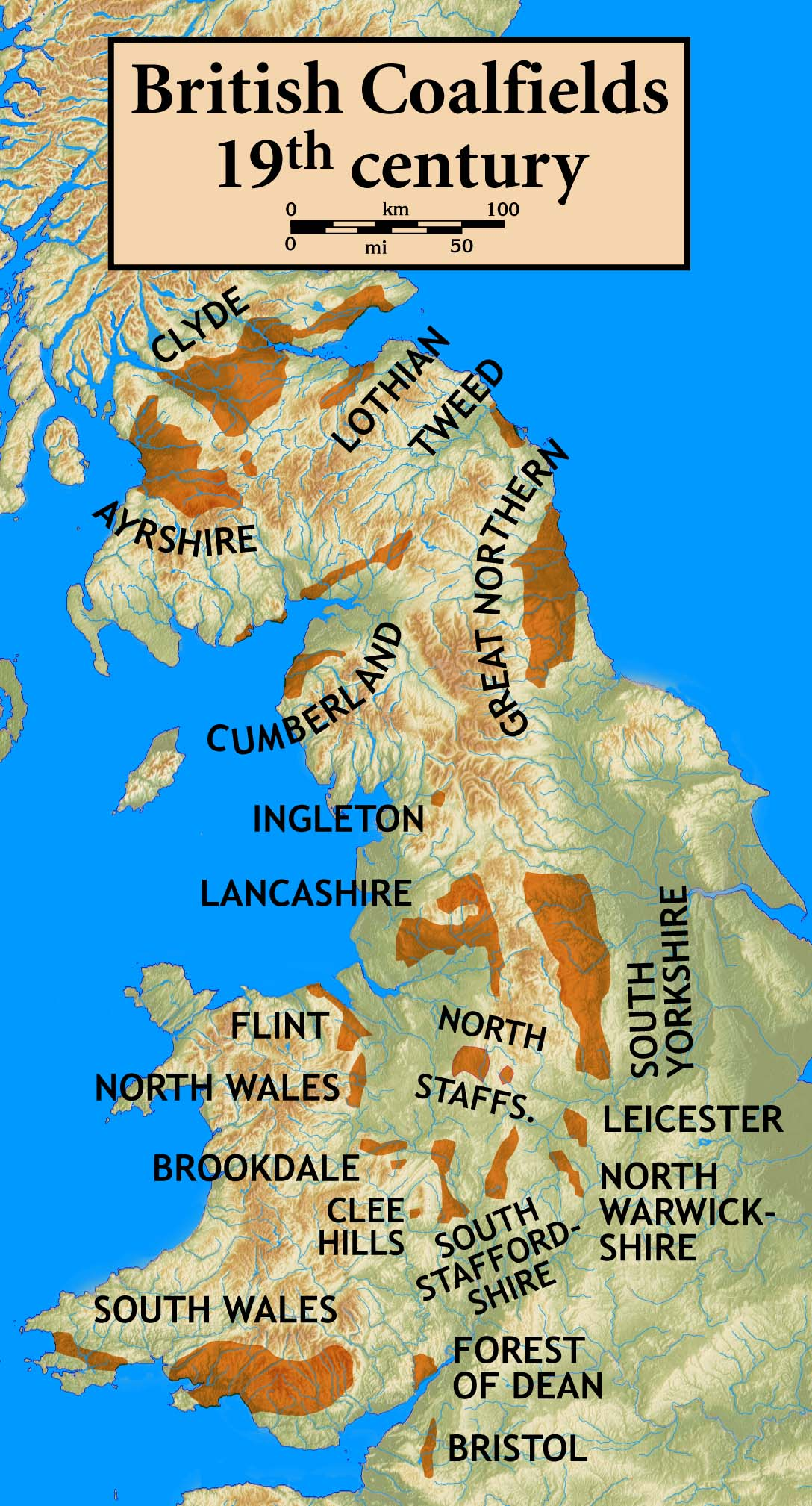
19th-century British coalfields

The North Wales Coalfield comprises the Flintshire Coalfield in the north and the Denbighshire Coalfield in the south. It extends from Point of Ayr in the north, through the Wrexham area to Oswestry in Shropshire in the south. A much smaller area on Anglesey where coal was formerly mined is not usually considered to form a part of the coalfield, although it is geographically in the North Wales region.

== History ==
In north Wales, the Flintshire manors of Ewloe, Hopedale, and Mostyn and the Denbighshire manor of Brymbo were recorded as making profits from trading coal during the 14th and 15th centuries. By 1593, coal was exported from ports on the Dee estuary. Trade developed swiftly and by 1616, the principal collieries were at Bagillt, Englefield, Leaderbrook, Mostyn, Uphfytton and Wepre. Most were horizontal adits or shallow bell pits, although a few were sufficiently large to have accumulations of water and ventilation problems.

In the Denbighshire Coalfield, the areas of Chirk, Ruabon and Wrexham became heavily industrialised and exploited large deposits of iron, coal and clay. The last colliery, the Bersham Colliery was closed in 1986 when it became uneconomic.

== Geography ==
The North Wales Coalfield is divided into the Flintshire Coalfield to the north and the nearly contiguous Denbighshire Coalfield to the south. The Flintshire Coalfield extends from the Point of Ayr in the north, through Connah's Quay to Caergwrle in the south and under the Dee Estuary to the Neston area of the Wirral Peninsula. The Denbighshire Coalfield extends from near Caergwrle in the north, to Wrexham, Ruabon, Rhosllannerchrugog and Chirk in the south, a small part extending into Shropshire in the Oswestry area.
