= Point of Ayr =

Northernmost point of mainland Wales

Coordinates: 53.357°N 3.322°W

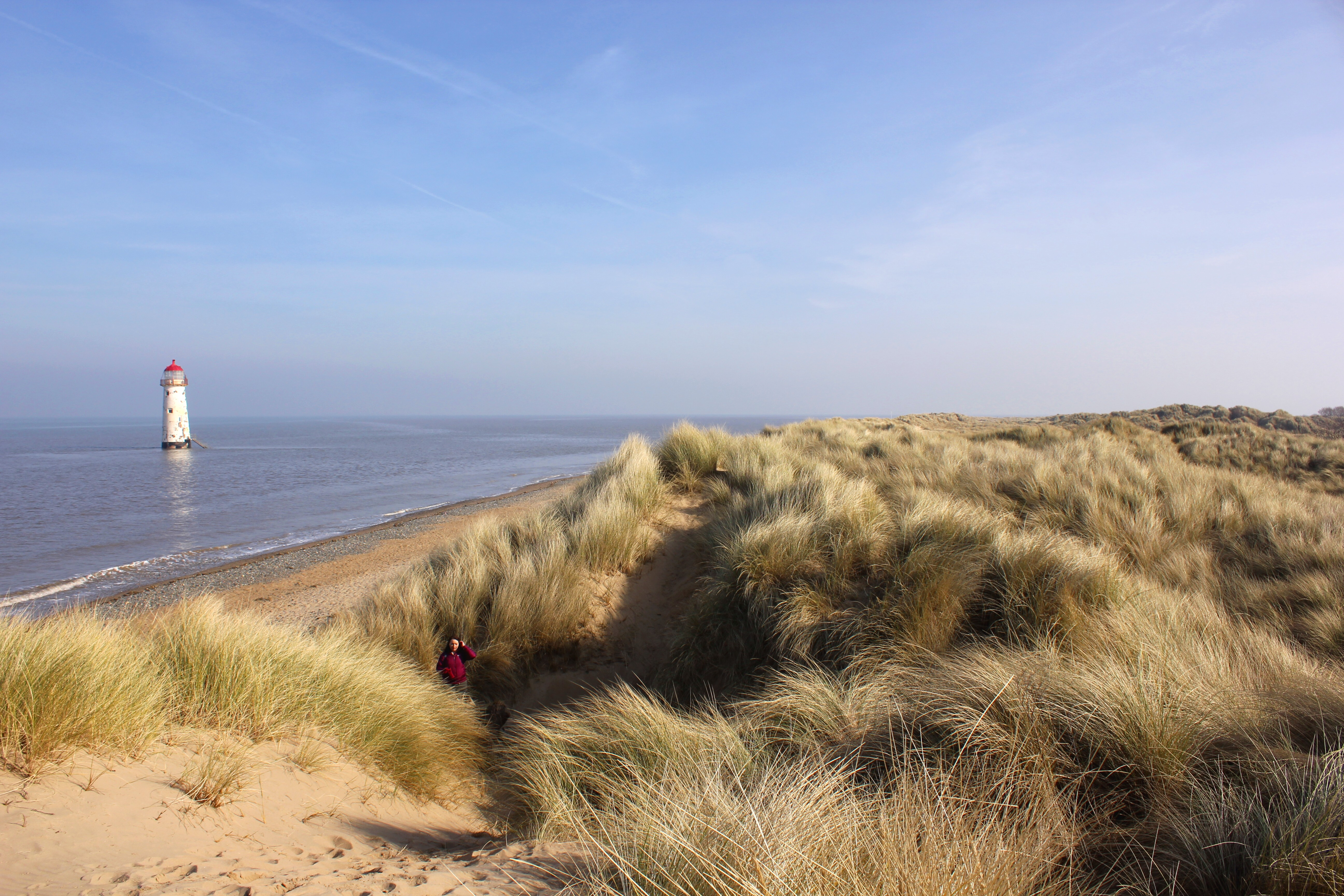
- The dunes and lighthouse at the Point of Ayr

- Location within Flintshire
- OS grid reference: SJ1202 8530
- Principal area: Flintshire
- Country: Wales
- Sovereign state: United Kingdom
- Post town: HOLYWELL
- Postcode district: CH8
- Dialling code: 01745
- Police: North Wales
- Fire: North Wales
- Ambulance: Welsh
- UK Parliament: Clwyd East
- Senedd Cymru – Welsh Parliament: Delyn

The Point of Ayr (Welsh: Y Parlwr Du) is the northernmost point of mainland Wales. It is situated immediately to the north of Talacre in Flintshire, at the mouth of the Dee estuary. It is to the southwest of the Liverpool Bay area of the Irish Sea. It is the site of a RSPB (Royal Society for the Protection of Birds) nature reserve RSPB Dee Estuary Point of Ayr, and is part of Gronant Dunes and Talacre Warren Site of Special Scientific Interest.

== Coal ==
For many years a colliery operated at the Point of Ayr at the northern extremity of the Flintshire Coalfield; it was one of the last remaining operational deep mines in Wales. The first trial borings took place in 1865, under the direction of Lord Mostyn, owner of Mostyn Colliery, a few miles away. The borings seemed successful, and the Prestatyn Coal Company was formed to commence operations proper, however the project was abandoned before it got off the ground. In 1873, the site was investigated a second time, by a newly formed company, the Western Mostyn Colliery Company, however the trial shaft was not successful, and the project was again abandoned.

In 1883, a third company was formed, the Point of Ayr Colliery Company, and in 1890 they struck a seam. Coal at this time was brought to the surface by a team of 75 pit ponies. A second shaft was also sunk around this time. According to the Inspector of Mines records, in 1896 the pit employed 356 men producing coal for domestic and industrial uses. A third shaft was sunk sometime after the National Coal Board took over the site following nationalisation in 1947. The coal field extended northwards under the Irish Sea. Six men were killed during the sinking of a new shaft on the 4th of July 1952. By 1953, 738 men were producing 213,000 tons of coal annually. Point of Ayr colliery closed on 23 August 1996. Nothing now remains of the colliery. However, like many former coal mines, the name is retained by "Point of Ayr Colliery Band", a Brass Band competing at Championship level.

The site was chosen in the early eighties for a demonstration "Oil from Coal" plant jointly funded by the government, the National Coal Board and others. Bench scale trials were carried out on site but the project became a victim of the miners strike and the subsequent cut back in research funding for this and clean burn technology. The plant never became operational and was scrapped.

== Gas ==
The Point of Ayr is also the place where natural gas from the Celtic gas-fields comes ashore. Gas is piped through a pipeline 33.5 km (20 mile) long from the Douglas Complex of gas and petroleum drilling platforms in the Irish Sea. The Point of Ayr gas terminal has a gas processing capacity of 300 million cubic feet (8.5 million cubic metres) per day at standard conditions. The facilities remove methanol (used for hydrate inhibition), water and condensate. The gas is sweetened with an amine solvent to remove sulphur compounds to below 3.3 ppm and chilled to reduce the hydrocarbon dewpoint. The processing plant was originally part of the BHP development of the Liverpool Bay area, but now owned and operated by Eni. Gas is transported through a 27-km (17 mile) underground pipeline at 30 bar along the North Wales coast to Connah's Quay. After further processing, the gas is sold to Uniper, for their combined cycle gas turbine power station at Connah's Quay, on Deeside, in Flintshire.

== Lighthouse ==
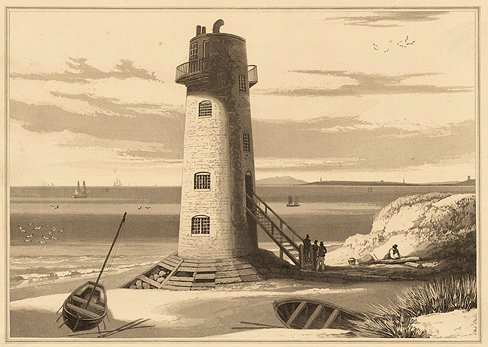
The Light-house on Point of Ayr, 1815

The Point of Ayr also gives its name to a lighthouse, built in 1776, though inactive since 1883. It stands on Talacre beach, at the entrance to the River Dee estuary. The lighthouse once displayed two lights. The main beam, at 63 feet, shone seaward towards Llandudno. A secondary beam shone up the River Dee, towards the hamlet of Dawpool, in Cheshire, on the English side of the estuary. Whilst in service, the lighthouse was painted with red and white stripes, and had a red lantern housing. It was replaced in 1844 with a metal pile lighthouse, bearing a white light, put up by order of the Corporation of Trinity House. This new structure was itself replaced in 1883 with a lightship.

== See also ==
- Point of Ayr Gas Terminal
- List of lighthouses in Wales
