= Hanmer baronets of Hanmer (1st creation, 1620) =

Escutcheon of the Hanmer baronets of Hanmer

The Hanmer baronetcy, of Hanmer in the County of Flint, was created in the Baronetage of England on 8 July 1620 for John Hanmer, son of Thomas Hanmer who died in 1619. He was subsequently elected Member of Parliament for Flintshire, as his father had been in 1593.

The 2nd Baronet represented Flint and Flintshire in the House of Commons. The 3rd Baronet was Member of Parliament for Flint, Flintshire and Evesham and fought at the Battle of the Boyne. His nephew the 4th Baronet sat for Thetford, Flintshire and Suffolk and served as Speaker of the House of Commons. The title became extinct on his death in 1746.

== Hanmer baronets, of Hanmer (1620) ==
- Sir John Hanmer, 1st Baronet (c. 1591–1624)
- Sir Thomas Hanmer, 2nd Baronet (1612–1678).
- Sir John Hanmer, 3rd Baronet (died 1701)
- Sir Thomas Hanmer, 4th Baronet (1677–1746), eldest son of William, second son of the 2nd Baronet.
