= John Hanmer =

John Hanmer may refer to:

- John Hanmer (MP died 1604), MP for Flint Boroughs (UK Parliament constituency)
- John Hanmer, 1st Baron Hanmer (1809–1881), British politician
- John Hanmer (bishop) (1574–1629), Welsh bishop of St. Asaph
- Sir John Hanmer, 3rd Baronet
- Sir John Hanmer, 1st Baronet
