= John Trevor (1626–1672) =

Welsh politician (1626–1672)

Sir John Trevor

Secretary of State for the Northern Department
- In office 29 September 1668 – 28 May 1672
- Preceded by: Sir William Morice
- Succeeded by: Henry Coventry

Personal details
- Born: 1626
- Died: 28 May 1672 (aged 45–46)
- Parent: Sir John Trevor

Sir John Trevor III (1626 – 28 May 1672) was a Welsh politician who sat in the House of Commons at various times between 1646 and 1672.

== Biography ==
Trevor was a son of Sir John Trevor II (1596-1673) of Trevalyn Hall, Denbighshire and Plas Teg, Flintshire. His father was a member of parliament under James I and Charles I, and sat also in the parliaments of Oliver and of Richard Cromwell, and was a member of the council of state during the Commonwealth.

In 1646, Trevor was elected Member of Parliament for Flintshire in the Long Parliament and sat until the Barebones Parliament of 1653. Thereafter he was re-elected MP for Flintshire in 1654 for the First Protectorate Parliament, in 1656 for the Second Protectorate Parliament and in 1659 for the Third Protectorate Parliament.

After filling several public positions under the Commonwealth and Protectorate he was a member of the council of state appointed in February 1660 and under Charles II, he rose to a high position. Having purchased the office of secretary of state he was knighted and entered upon its duties towards the end of 1668, just after he had helped to arrange an important treaty between England and France.

Trevor predeceased his father by a year, dying on 28 May 1672.

== Family ==
Trevor married Ruth Hampden, daughter of John Hampden and had a son Thomas who was created Baron Trevor in 1712. One of Trevor's great uncles was Sir Sackville Trevor (d. 1633), a naval officer, who was knighted in 1604; and another was Sir Thomas Trevor (1586–1656), one of the judges who decided in favour of the Crown in the famous case about the legality of ship money, and was afterwards impeached and fined.

== Notes ==
Political offices
Preceded by Sir William Morice, Bt	Secretary of State for the Northern Department; 1668–1672	Succeeded by Henry Coventry
Parliament of England
Preceded by John Mostyn	Member of Parliament for Flintshire; 1646–1653	Succeeded by Not represented in Barebones Parliament
Preceded by Not represented in Barebones Parliament	Member of Parliament for Flintshire; 1654–1660; With: Andrew Ellice 1654; Sir John Glynne	Succeeded by Kenrick Eyton
Preceded by The Earl of Orrery; The Viscount Falkland	Member of Parliament for Arundel; 1660–1661 with The Earl of Orrery	Succeeded by The Earl of Orrery; The Lord Aungier of Longford
Preceded by Henry Clerke; Duke Stonehouse	Member of Parliament for Great Bedwyn; 1663–1672; With: Henry Clerke	Succeeded by Henry Clerke; Daniel Finch
