= Sir Henry Conway, 1st Baronet =

English politician

Sir Henry Conway, 1st Baronet (1630–1669) was a Welsh landowner and politician who sat in the House of Commons of England from 1661 to 1669.

Conway was the son of William Conway of Bodrythan, Flintshire and his wife Lucy Mostyn, daughter of Thomas Mostyn of Rhyd. He was Sheriff of Flintshire from 1656 to 1657. He was created a baronet on 25 July 1660. In 1661, he was elected Member of Parliament for Flintshire in the Cavalier Parliament.

Conway died at the age of about 39.

Conway married Mary Lloyd, daughter of Richard Lloyd of Esclusham, Denbighshire. He was succeeded by his son John.

Parliament of England
Preceded by Kenrick Eyton	Member of Parliament for Flintshire; 1661–1669	Succeeded by Sir Thomas Hanmer, 2nd Baronet
Baronetage of England
New title	Baronet (of Bodrythan); 1660–1669	Succeeded by John Conway
