= Conway baronets =

Extinct baronetcy in the Baronetage of England

The Conway Baronetcy, of Bodrythan in the County of Flint, was a title in the Baronetage of England. It was created on 25 July 1660 for Henry Conway, subsequently Member of Parliament for Flintshire. He was a descendant of John Conway, whose brother Edward was the ancestor of the Earls of Conway. The second Baronet represented both Flintshire and Flint in Parliament. The title became extinct on his death in 1721.

== Conway baronets, of Bodrythan (1660) ==
- Sir Henry Conway, 1st Baronet (1635–1669)
- Sir John Conway, 2nd Baronet (c. 1663–1721)

== See also ==
- Earl of Conway
