= 1872 Flintshire by-election =

UK Parliamentary by-election

The 1872 Flintshire by-election was fought on 2 March 1872. The by-election was fought due to the incumbent MP of the Liberal Party, Lord Richard Grosvenor, becoming Vice-Chamberlain of the Household. He was returned unopposed.

== Result ==
1872 Flintshire by-election
Party	Candidate	Votes	%	±%
Liberal	Lord Richard Grosvenor	Unopposed		
Registered electors				
Liberal hold				
