= Richard Trevor =

Richard Trevor may refer to:

- Richard Trevor (bishop) (1707–1771), Bishop of St David's, Bishop of Durham
- Sir Richard Trevor (politician) (1558–1638), Welsh landowner, soldier and politician
