= Sir John Conway, 2nd Baronet =

Welsh politician (c. 1662–1721)

Sir John Conway, 2nd Baronet (c. 1662 – 1721) of Bodrhyddan Hall, Rhuddlan, Denbighshire was a British landowner and Tory politician who sat in the House of Commons between 1685 and 1721.

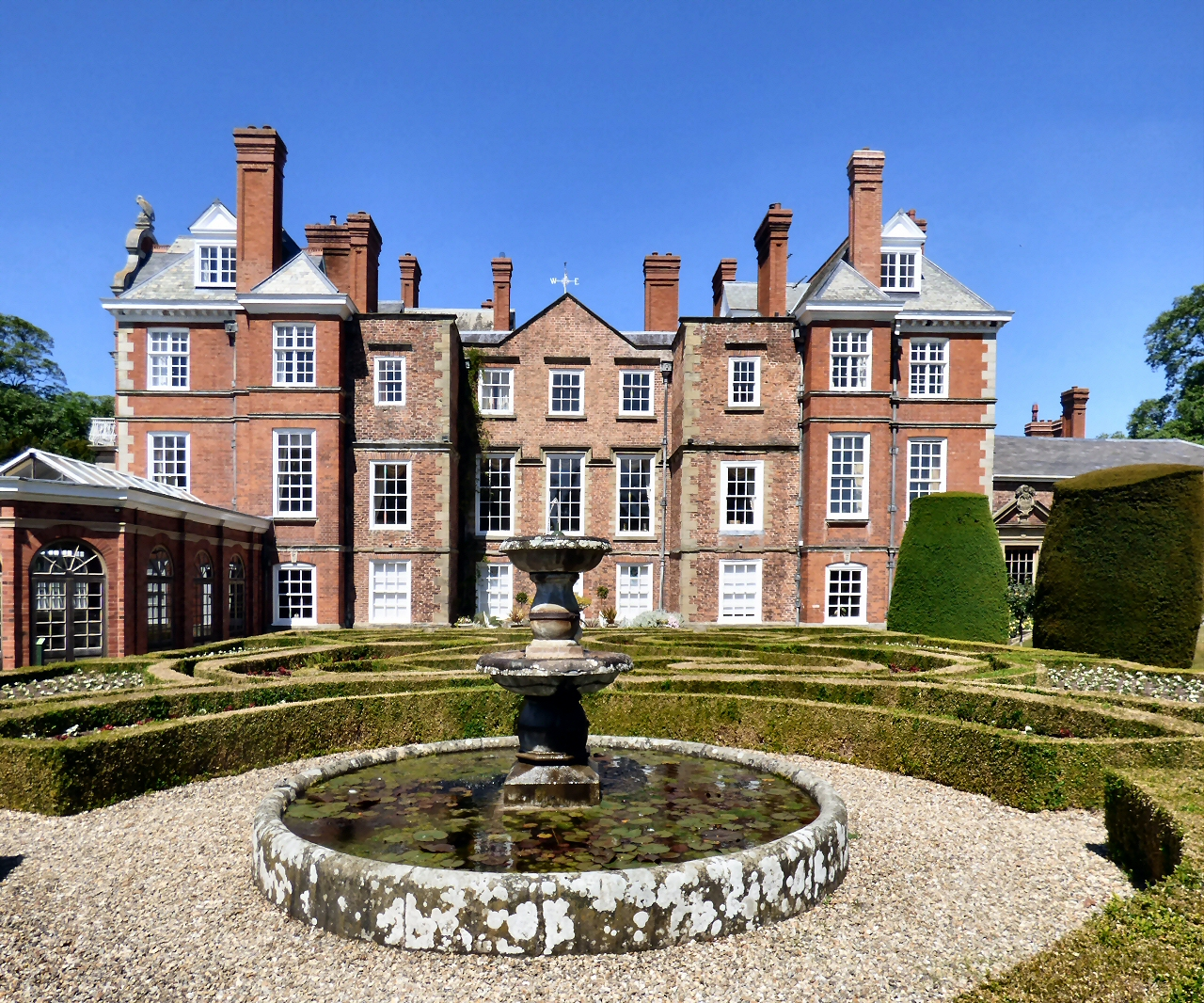
Bodrhyddan Hall, Denbighshire

== Early life ==
Conway was the eldest son of Sir Henry Conway, 1st Baronet of Bodrhyddan and his wife Mary Lloyd, daughter of Sir Richard Lloyd of Ecclesham, Denbighshire. He succeeded to the baronetcy on the death of his father in 1669. He was educated at Eton College in 1678 and matriculated at Christ Church, Oxford on 10 June 1679, aged 16.

== Career ==
Conway became a freeman of Denbigh in 1679. At the 1685 general election he was returned as MP for Flintshire. He did not stand in 1687 as he was selected to be High Sheriff of Flintshire in 1688 and was deputy lieutenant from 1689 to about 1696. He was commissioner for assessment for Denbighshire and Flintshire for the year 1689 to 1690.

Conway was a Justice of the Peace by 1691 and after a break in 1696 remained on the bench from 1700 until his death. The Flintshire seat rotated among the local families and at the 1695 English general election it was Conway's turn to be returned as MP for Flintshire. He voted against fixing the price of guineas at 22s and against the attainder of Sir John Fenwick on 25 November 1696. He was returned again at the 1698 English general election and in the first election of 1701 but stood down in the second. He was then returned as MP for Flint Boroughs on 2 February 1702 and voted for the motion of 26 February 1702 vindicating the Commons’ proceedings in impeaching the four Whig lords. In July 1702, he refused to stand aside under local convention and was defeated in the only contest he faced. He was returned as MP for Flintshire at the 1705 English general election and voted against the Court candidate for Speaker on 25 October 1705. At the 1708 general election he was returned as Tory MP for Flint Boroughs. He voted against the impeachment of Dr Sacheverell in 1710. He was returned again at the 1710 British general election and was listed among the ‘Tory patriots’ who voted for peace, and among the ‘worthy patriots’ who exposed the mismanagements of the previous ministry. By this time he was in serious financial difficulties. He let the Bodrhyddan estate and tried to sell other estates. He appealed to Robert Harley for assistance with mixed fortunes. He was returned for Flintshire again in 1713 and voted in favour of the French commercial treaty on 18 June 1713.

Conway was last returned for Flint Boroughs at the 1715 general election and held the seat without making any parliamentary contribution until his death.

== Private life ==
Conway died at Bath on 27 April 1721, aged 58, and was buried at Rhuddlan. He married firstly Margaretta Maria Digby daughter of John Digby of Gayhurst, Buckinghamshire. Margaretta died in June 1690 and he married secondly Penelope Grenville, daughter of Richard Grenville of Wotton, Buckinghamshire in 1701. He left two daughters by each of his marriages but his son died and the baronetcy became extinct. Bodrhyddan passed to his daughter Penelope who married James Russell Stapleton.

Parliament of England
Preceded by Sir John Hanmer, 3rd Baronet	Member of Parliament for Flintshire; 1685 English general election–1687	Succeeded by Sir Roger Puleston
Preceded by Sir Roger Puleston	Member of Parliament for Flintshire; 1695–1701	Succeeded by Sir Roger Mostyn, Bt
Preceded by Sir Thomas Hanmer, Bt	Member of Parliament for Flint Boroughs; 1702–1702	Succeeded by Thomas Mostyn
Preceded by Sir Thomas Hanmer, Bt	Member of Parliament for Flintshire; 1705–1708	Succeeded by Sir Roger Mostyn, Bt
Parliament of Great Britain
Preceded by Sir Roger Mostyn, Bt	Member of Parliament for Flint Boroughs; 1708–1713	Succeeded by Sir Roger Mostyn, Bt
Preceded by Sir Roger Mostyn, Bt	Member of Parliament for Flintshire; 1713–1715	Succeeded by Sir Roger Mostyn, Bt
Preceded by Sir Roger Mostyn, Bt	Member of Parliament for Flint Boroughs; 1715–1721	Succeeded by Thomas Eyton
Baronetage of England
Preceded by Henry Conway	Baronet (of Bodrythan); 1669–1721	Extinct
