= Andrew Ellice =

Andrew Ellice was a Welsh army officer and politician who sat in the House of Commons in 1654. He served in the Parliamentary army.

Ellice was from Althrey in Wales. He was an officer in the Parliamentary army and was Commissioner of Sequestration for Denbighsire and Flintshire. On 18 June 1650, he was appointed by the London Committee to be steward of sequestered estates of James Stanley, 7th Earl of Derby in Flintshire. On 2 August 1650, he was ordered to secure Hawarden Castle. He was appointed by the Council of State as captain of a Troop of Horse for North Wales on 13 August 1650 and became a militia commissioner for North Wales on 23 March 1651.

In 1654, Ellice was elected member of parliament for Flintshire in the First Protectorate Parliament. In August 1654, with Sir John Trevor (elder) and Colonel Twistleton, he purchased the forfeited manors of the Earl of Derby and chose the manor of Mold.

Parliament of England
| Preceded by Not represented in Barebones Parliament | Member of Parliament for Flintshire; 1654; With: Sir John Trevor | Succeeded by Sir John Trevor; Sir John Glynne |
