= Warner baronets =

Set index for Warner baronets

There have been two baronetcies created for persons with the surname Warner, one in the Baronetage of England and one in the Baronetage of the United Kingdom. As of 2026 one creation is extant.

- Warner baronets of Parham (1660)
- Warner baronets of Brettenham (1910)
