= John Trevor (1563–1630) =

Welsh judge and MP

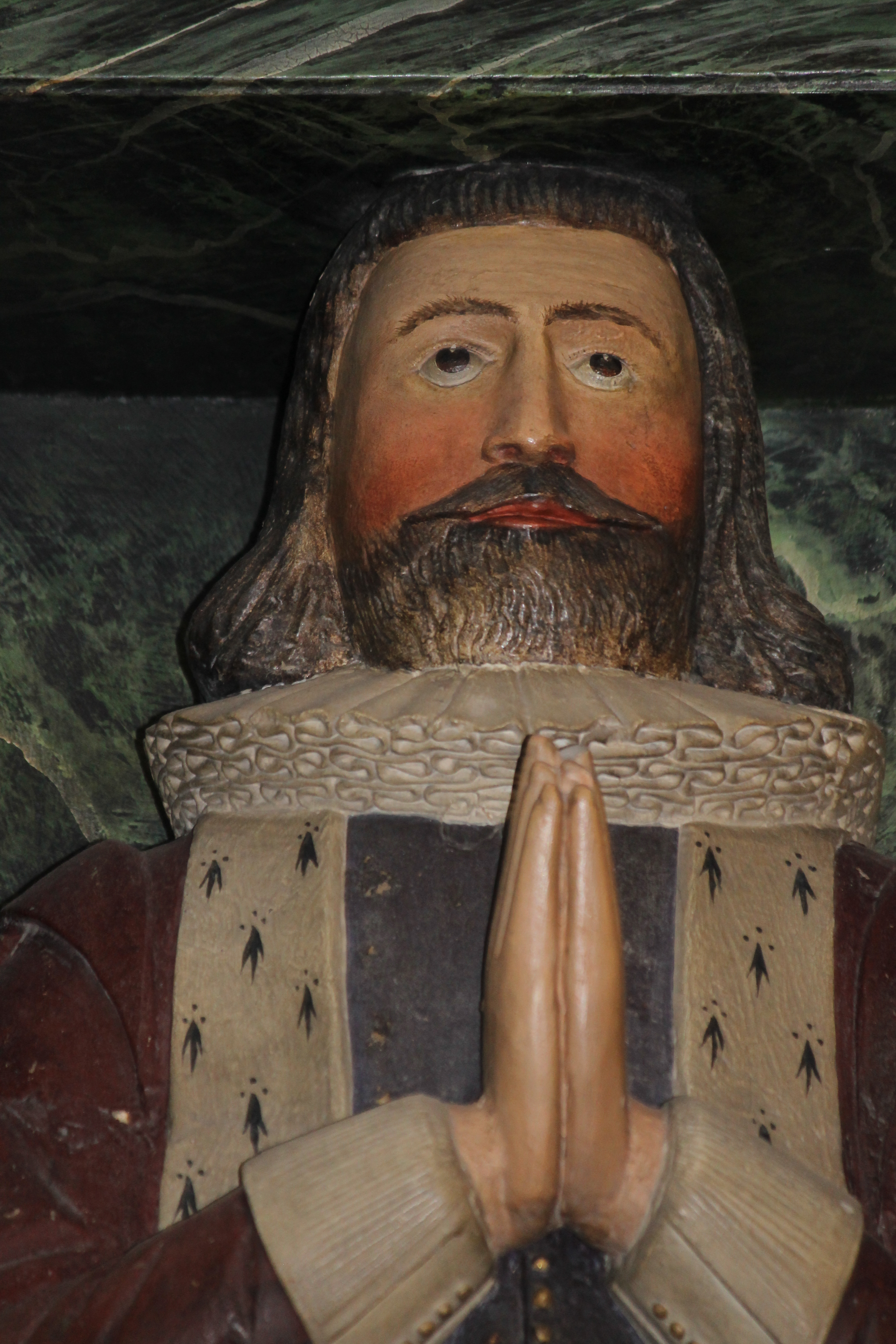
Funerary monument to John Trevor in St Cyngar's Church, Hope, Flintshire

Sir John Trevor I (1563–1630) was a Welsh politician.

Born in 1563 at Sheen House, Mortlake, Surrey, he was the second son of John Trevor of Trevalyn Hall, Denbighshire, and the younger brother of Richard Trevor and older brother of Thomas Trevor and Sackville Trevor. His father had greatly enhanced his family's fortunes in the service of his wife's cousin, Sir Richard Sackville. Trevor continued to serve Sackville's son Sir Thomas Sackville (Baron Buckhurst, later created 1st Earl of Dorset). Likely through Buckhurst's influence, he became secretary to Charles Howard, 1st Earl of Nottingham, as did his brothers Richard and Sackville. In 1592, he married Margaret (1565–1646), daughter of Sir Hugh Trevanion (1522–1571) of Caerhays, Sheriff of Cornwall, sister of Elizabeth Trevanion (wife of Robert Carey, 1st Earl of Monmouth, cousin of Elizabeth I)

Through his Howard and Trevanion connections, Trevor represented in the House of Commons Reigate in 1593 and 1601, Bletchingley in 1597, 1604, and 1614, Bodmin in 1621 and East Looe in 1625.

The chief focus of Trevor's career, however, was his tenure as Surveyor and Rigger of the Navy, to which he was appointed in 1598. Whilst the official remuneration for this post was a mere £145 6s. 8d. a year, Trevor took advantage of the many opportunities to augment this, which doubtless provided him with his largest source of income until his resignation in 1611.

That Trevor was in high favour at court is evident from the honours and appointments showered on him at that time. In 1603 alone, he was knighted by King James I at the Tower of London, he was granted the office of Steward and Receiver at Windsor Castle, he was appointed Keeper of Upnor Castle and also Keeper of the house and royal park of Oatlands (where Trevor lived for much of the rest of his life). He was also a Gentleman Usher of the Privy Chamber by 1603 and a Gentleman of the Privy Chamber from 1625.

He died on 20 February 1630 at Plas Teg and was buried in St Cyngar's Church in Hope, Flintshire.

His son, Sir John Trevor II, and grandson, Sir John Trevor III, were both MPs.
