= Thomas Herle =

English politician

Thomas Herle (29 December 1622 – c. June 1681) was an English politician who sat in the House of Commons between 1659 and 1679.

Herle was the son of Thomas Herle of Prideaux, Cornwall, and his wife Loveday Glyn, daughter of Nicholas Glyn of Glyn, Cornwall and brother of Edward Herle, M.P. He was educated at Exeter College, Oxford and entered the Middle Temple in 1648.

In 1659, Herle was elected Member of Parliament for Grampound in the Third Protectorate Parliament. He was re-elected MP for Grampound for the Convention Parliament in 1660 and was then elected MP for Tregony in the Cavalier Parliament of 1661, sitting until 1679.

Herle died unmarried in 1681 at the age of 58.

Parliament of England
Preceded by Not represented in Second Protectorate Parliament	Member of Parliament for Grampound; 1659; With: Robert Scawen	Succeeded by Sir John Trevor
