= Sir Thomas Hanmer, 2nd Baronet =

English politician (1612–1678)

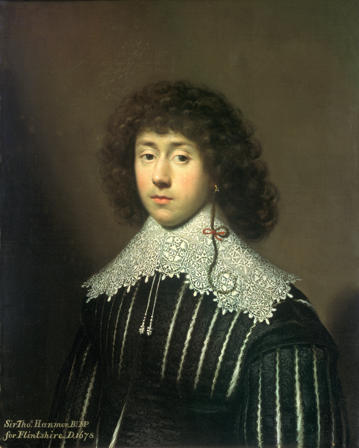
Sir Thomas Hanmer painted by Cornelius Johnson (1631)

Sir Thomas Hanmer, 2nd Baronet (1612 – 1678) was an English politician who sat in the House of Commons in 1640 and from 1669 to 1678. He was a Royalist during the English Civil War and raised troops for Charles I. In his personal life, he was a keen horticulturist. He is not to be confused with Sir Thomas Hanmer, 2nd Baronet (1747–1828) of the second creation, nor with his grandson, Sir Thomas Hanmer, 4th Baronet.

== Life ==
Hanmer was born in 1612, the eldest son of Sir John Hanmer, 1st Baronet. His father was a Member of Parliament for Flintshire and tended towards the Puritan side of Parliament. Hanmer was a page to Charles I from 1625 to 1627, and became the king's cupbearer. He was interested in horticulture and corresponded with other gardeners.

With the death of his father, Hanmer inherited the Hanmer Baronetage, becoming the 2nd Baronet Hanmer. In April 1640, Hanmer was elected Member of Parliament for Flint Boroughs in the Short Parliament. Despite his uncle, Roger Hanmer, supporting Parliament during the Civil War, Thomas was a Royalist and was the cup-bearer of Charles I of England; and Charles proposed to his nephew, Prince Rupert that Hanmer be made vice-president of Wales.

In 1669, Hanmer gained his second Parliamentary seat when he was elected as member for Flintshire, which he held until his death in 1678.

== Family ==
Hanmer was married twice: his first marriage was to Elizabeth Baker, who eloped with the eccentric pamphleteer the Hon. Thomas Hervey, a son of John Hervey, 1st Earl of Bristol. There were two surviving children of this marriage, one a son John, who succeeded him as 3rd Baronet. A daughter, Trevor (1636–1670) married John Warner (1640–1705) of Parham, Sussex, both then converting to Catholicism; she became a Carthusian nun.

Thomas Hanmer married, secondly, Susan Hervey, daughter of Sir William Hervey, MP for Bury St. Edmunds. Of this marriage his son, William (born circa 1648 in Angers, Anjou, France), aged 15 went to Pembroke College, Oxford; he married Peregrina, daughter and co-heiress of Sir Sir Henry North, 1st Baronet, of Mildenhall, Essex. Their children were Susanna (16 August 1676 – 23 September 1744), who married Sir Henry Bunbury of Rake Hall, Little Stanney, Cheshire; and Thomas, later 4th Baronet. John, the 3rd baronet died without issue in 1701; his younger brother William having already predeceased their father (the 2nd Baronet), William's son Thomas succeeded to the baronetcy.

A daughter, Thomasin, married Robert Booth and died without issue on 14 May 1712.

Parliament of the United Kingdom
Vacant Parliament suspended since 1629	Member of Parliament for Flint; 1640	Succeeded by John Salusbury
Preceded by Sir Henry Conway, 1st Baronet	Member of Parliament for Flintshire; 1669–1678	Succeeded by Mutton Davies
Honorary titles
Interregnum	Custos Rotulorum of Flintshire; 1660–1678	Succeeded by Sir Roger Mostyn
Baronetage of England
Preceded by John Hanmer	Baronet (of Hanmer); 1624–1678	Succeeded by John Hanmer
