= 1886 Flintshire by-election =

UK parliamentary by-election in Wales

The 1886 Flintshire by-election was a parliamentary by-election held for the UK House of Commons constituency of Flintshire in Wales on 2 March 1886.

== Vacancy ==
The by-election was caused by the resignation of the sitting Liberal MP, Richard Grosvenor who was appointed a Steward of the Chiltern Hundreds and then to the House of Lords.

== Candidates ==
Two candidates were nominated.

The Liberal Party nominated businessman Samuel Smith.

The Conservative Party nominated Justice of the Peace Philip Pennant Pennant.

== Result ==
1886 Flintshire by-election
| Party | Candidate | Votes | % | ±% |
|---|---|---|---|---|
| Liberal | Samuel Smith | 4,248 | 60.8 | +0.5 |
| Conservative | Philip Pennant Pennant | 2,738 | 39.2 | −0.5 |
| Majority | | 1,510 | 21.6 | +1.0 |
| Turnout | | 6,986 | 69.3 | −9.0 |
| Registered electors | | 10,081 | | |
| Liberal hold | | Swing | +0.5 | |
