= Thomas Lloyd-Mostyn =

British Liberal Party Member of Parliament

Thomas Edward Mostyn Lloyd-Mostyn (23 January 1830 – 8 May 1861), was a British Liberal Party (UK) Member of Parliament (MP).

Lloyd-Mostyn was the eldest son and heir apparent of Edward Lloyd-Mostyn, 2nd Baron Mostyn. He was educated at Christ Church, Oxford. He was elected unopposed at a by-election in 1854 to succeed his father as Member of Parliament for Flintshire in 1854, a seat he held until his death in May 1861, aged only 31. His son Llewellyn succeeded in the barony in 1884.

He was also a first-class cricketer, for Oxford University and the Marylebone Cricket Club.

Parliament of the United Kingdom
Preceded by Edward Lloyd-Mostyn	Member of Parliament for Flintshire; 1854–1861	Succeeded by Lord Richard Grosvenor
