= Samuel Smith (Liberal politician) =

British politician

Samuel Smith

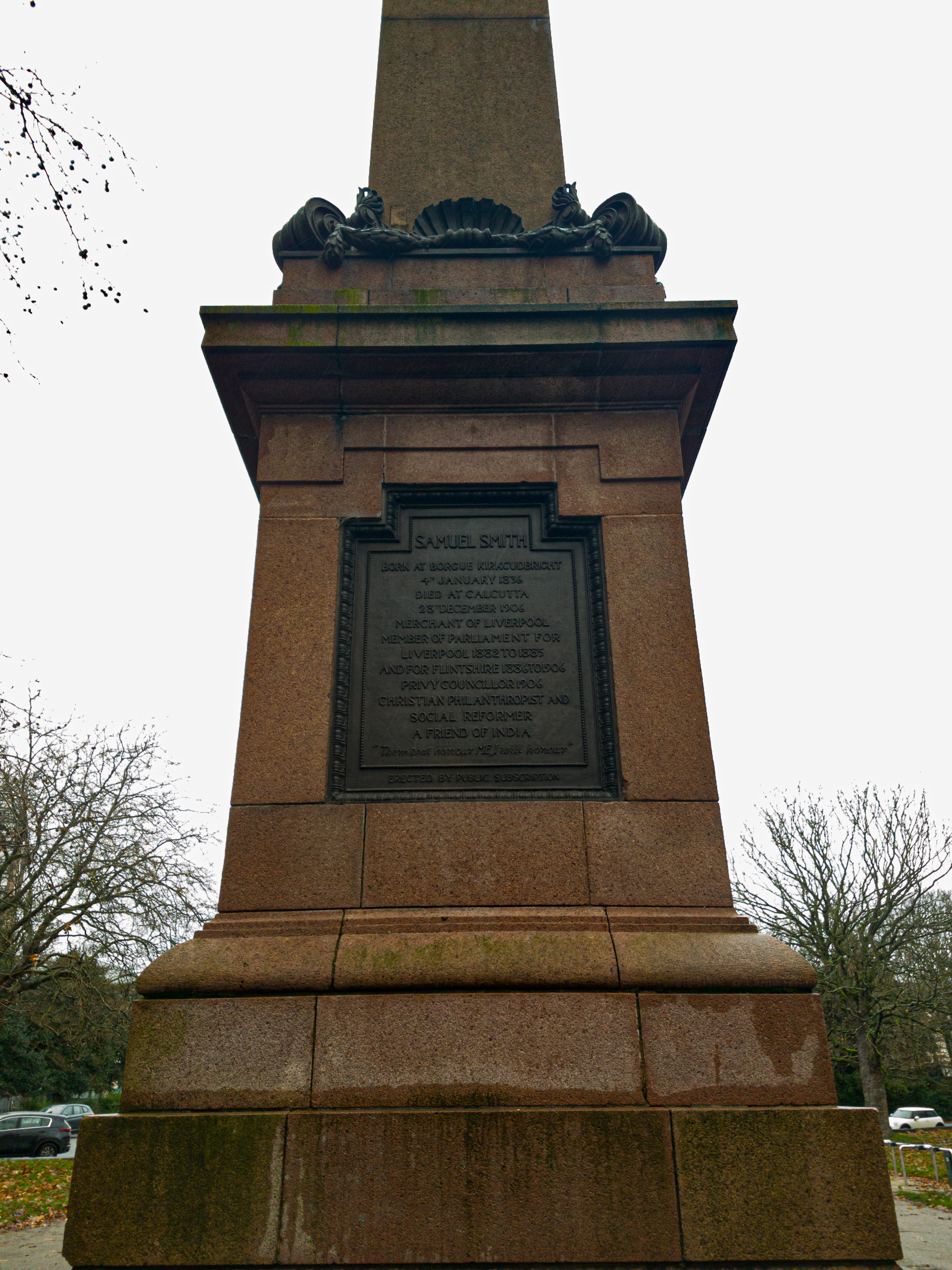
Samuel Smith pillar inscription at Sefton Park, Liverpool.

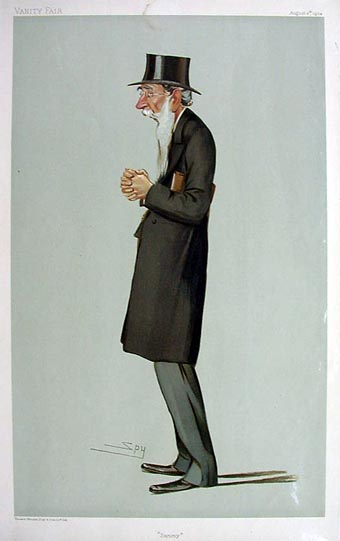
"Sammy" Smith as caricatured by Spy (Leslie Ward) in Vanity Fair, August 1904

Samuel Smith (4 January 1836 – 28 December 1906) was a British politician. He served as a Liberal Member of Parliament (MP) from 1882 to 1885 and from 1886 to 1906. He was noted for being a champion of "social purity" and opposed many plays with open displays of sexuality that he saw as "glorification of the vulgarest debauchery". Targets included the plays The Gay Lord Quex and Zaza.

== Life ==
Born near Borgue, Galloway, he was educated at Borgue parish school and Kirkcudbright Academy before attending Edinburgh University. His grandfather and his uncle, both named Samuel Smith, were each parish minister of Borgue. The former (d. 1816) wrote 'A General View of the Agriculture of Galloway' (1806); the latter seceded at the disruption of the Scottish church in 1843. He was apprenticed to a Liverpool cotton broker in 1853. By 1864 he was head of the Liverpool branch of James Finlay & Co., a large cotton business of Glasgow and Bombay.

Smith was first elected to Parliament on 11 December 1882 in a by-election in Liverpool, following the Conservative MP Viscount Sandon's succession to the Peerage as Earl of Harrowby on 19 November 1882. The three-seat Liverpool constituency was split for the 1885 general election and Smith stood in the new Liverpool Abercromby seat. However, he lost to the Conservative candidate William Lawrence by 807 votes. He returned to Parliament in a by-election in Flintshire on 3 March 1886. This by-election followed the elevation to the Peerage of Lord Richard Grosvenor. Smith remained the seat's MP until he retired at the 1906 general election. He died later that year aged 70 at Calcutta, India.

Edge Hill University has a hall of residence called Smith in honour of his contribution to the institution. He co-founded the university in 1885.

Parliament of the United Kingdom
Preceded by Viscount Sandon; Edward Whitley; Lord Claud Hamilton	Member of Parliament for Liverpool; 1882 – 1885; With: Edward Whitley; Lord Claud Hamilton	constituency abolished
Preceded by Lord Richard Grosvenor	Member of Parliament for Flintshire; 1886 – 1906	Succeeded by Herbert Lewis
