= John Hanmer (bishop) =

Welsh bishop

John Hanmer (1574–1629) was a Welsh bishop of St. Asaph.

== Life ==
Hanmer was born at Pentrepant, in the parish of Selattyn, near Oswestry in Shropshire. He matriculated at Oriel College, Oxford, 2 June 1592, and became a fellow of All Souls College in 1596, proceeding B.A. 14 July 1596, M.A. 5 April 1600, B.D. 1 Dec. 1615, and D.D. 13 November 1616. In 1605 he acted as junior proctor when George Abbot was vice-chancellor in a year made memorable by a visit of James I to the university. He became rector of Bingham, Nottinghamshire, and in January 1614 was appointed prebendary of Worcester. He was also a chaplain to James I.Tout 1890, p. 294

On 20 January 1624 he was elected bishop of St. Asaph, in succession to Richard Parry. He was consecrated on 15 February by Archbishop Abbot at Lambeth Palace. On 16 February, he received the restitution of his temporalities, and, owing to the poverty of the see, was allowed to retain his prebend along with the archdeaconry of St. Asaph and other benefices in commendam, to the amount in all of £150l. per annum.

He died at Pentrepant on 23 July 1629, and was buried the next day in Selattyn Church among the ashes of his forefathers. A brass in Selattyn Church spoke of his piety, activity, and happy end. He was of the same family as Meredith Hanmer.
