= Thomas Trevor (1586–1656) =

English lawyer, judge and Member of Parliament

Sir Thomas Trevor (6 July 1586 – 21 December 1656) was an English lawyer, judge and Member of Parliament, most notable for having delivered the judgment against John Hampden in the Ship Money case.

== Biography ==
He was the fifth and youngest son of John Trevor of Trevalyn, Denbighshire, and the younger brother of Richard Trevor, John Trevor and Sackville Trevor. He was admitted to membership of Inner Temple at an unusually early age and was called to the bar in 1603. He was elected MP for Tregony, Cornwall in 1601, Harwich in 1604 (part year only) and Newport, Cornwall in 1614. In 1619 he was knighted and appointed solicitor to Prince Charles; the following year, he was a reader of his inn, and he sat as MP for Saltash in the Parliaments of 1621 and 1624–5, and for East Looe in that of 1625. On the accession of the Prince to throne as Charles I in 1625, Trevor was advanced to the degree of serjeant-at-law, and shortly afterwards was appointed a judge of the Court of Exchequer. In that capacity he became a member of the Commission to exercise ecclesiastical jurisdiction in 1633.

In 1637, Trevor was one of the twelve judges who collectively gave an opinion that the Crown could legitimately collect Ship Money, and the following year gave judgment in court to the same effect in Hampden's case. As a consequence, in 1641 Parliament began proceedings to impeach him, together with other judges who had supported ship money. Nevertheless, on the outbreak of the Civil War he was one of the few judges who remained in London and recognised the authority of Parliament. At the conclusion of the impeachment in 1643, he was found guilty, fined and sentenced to be imprisoned at the pleasure of the House of Lords, but he was released immediately and resumed his seat on the bench. At Michaelmas 1643, when the King sent a writ demanding the attendance of him and another judge (Edmund Reeve) on the court at Oxford, they refused and had the messengers arrested: one was later executed as a spy. Despite this, Trevor was opposed to the King's execution, and refused the commission that was offered to him by the new government. He then retired completely from public life until his death.

== Family ==
Trevor was twice married: first, to Prudence, daughter of Henry Boteler; and, secondly, to Frances, daughter and heiress of Daniel Blennerhasset of Norfolk. By the former he had an only son Thomas, who was created a baronet in 1641, and died without issue on 26 February 1676, when his estate descended to Sir Charles Wheler, grandson of Trevor's sister Mary.
