= Warner baronets of Parham (1660) =

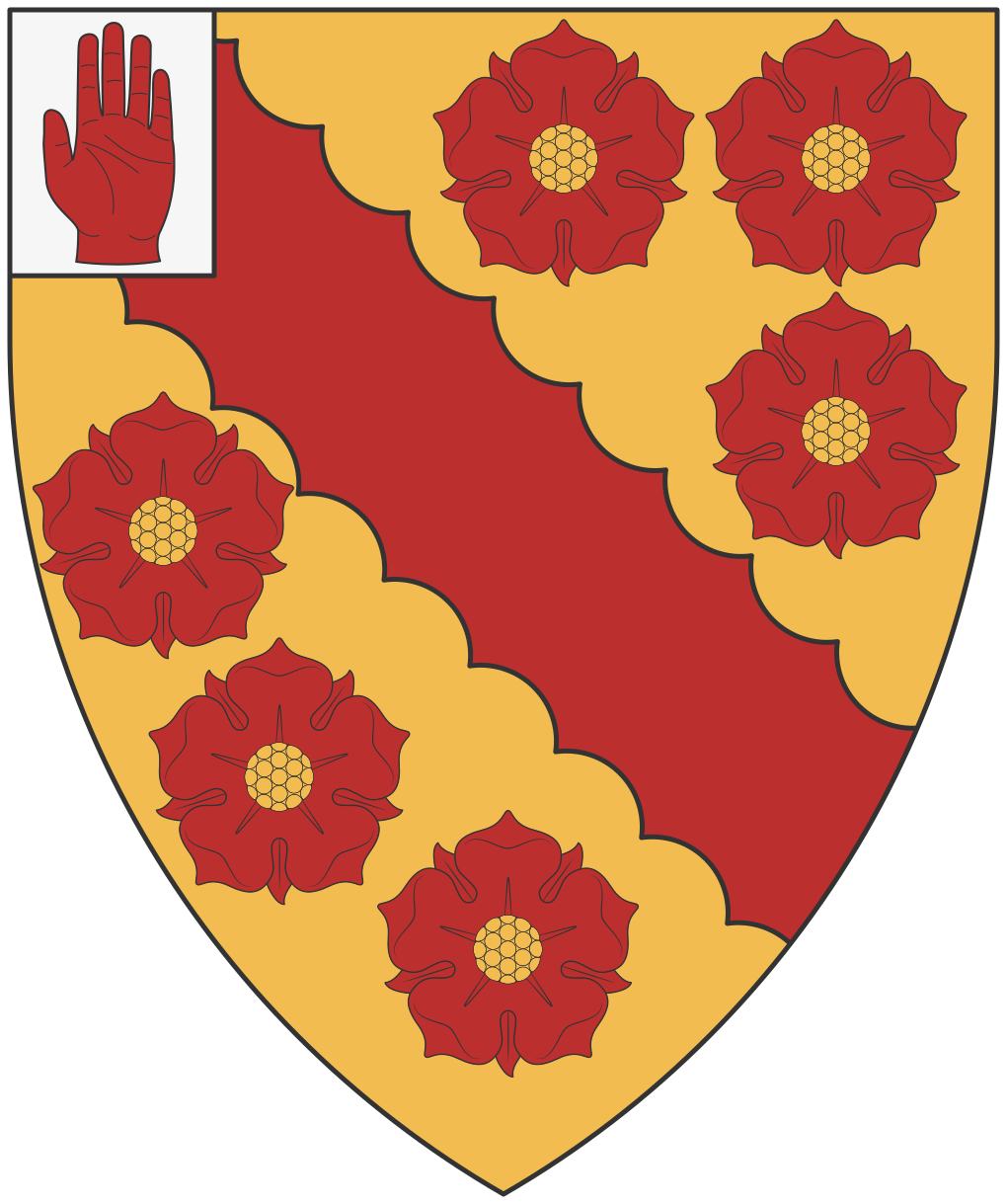
Arms of Warner of Parham

The Warner baronetcy, of Parham in the County of Suffolk, was created in the Baronetage of England on 16 July 1660 for John Warner. The title became extinct on his death in 1705.

John Warner SJ was the son of Francis Warner of Parham and his wife Elizabeth Rous, sister of Sir John Rous, 1st Baronet. He married in 1659 Trevor Hanmer, daughter of Sir Thomas Hanmer, 2nd Baronet by his first wife.

In 1664 both Warner and his wife became Catholic converts, and separated. She became a Sepulchrine at Liège in 1665. He was admitted to the Society of Jesus that year, and became rector of Watten in 1685. He left no male heir on his death in 1705.

== Warner baronets, of Parham (1660) ==
- Sir John Warner, 1st Baronet (c. 1640–1705)
