= Richard Trevor (politician) =

Welsh landowner, soldier and politician

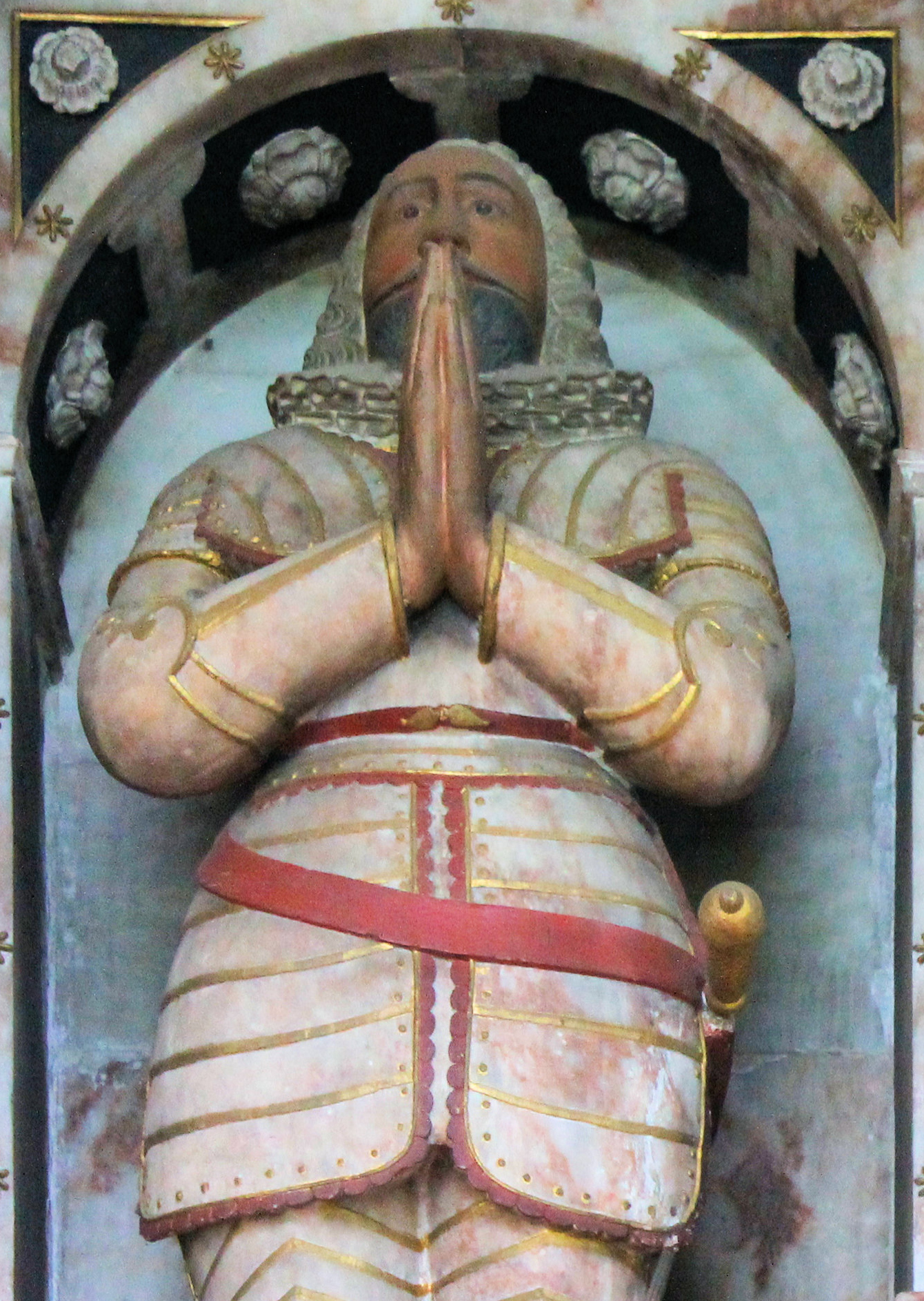

Sir Richard Trevor (1558–1638) was a Welsh landowner, soldier and politician.

He was the eldest son of John Trevor of Trevalyn Hall, Denbighshire. He was the elder brother of Sir John Trevor, Sir Thomas Trevor and Sir Sackville Trevor. He inherited the Trevor family estate of Trevalyn in Denbighshire on the death of his father in 1589.

Trevor was knighted in 1597, while on military service in Ireland, and, like his younger brothers Sackville Trevor and John Trevor, he enjoyed the patronage of Charles Howard, 1st Earl of Nottingham. He was brought in as MP for Bletchingley to replace Howard when Howard elected to represent Surrey. He became a member of the Council of Wales and the Marches in 1602. From 1596 to 1626 he was Vice-Admiral of North Wales.

He married Katherine, daughter of Roger Puleston of Emral; they had four daughters. Trevalyn was bequeathed to his nephew, Sir John Trevor.
