= Sir Thomas Hanmer, 4th Baronet =

British politician (1677–1746)

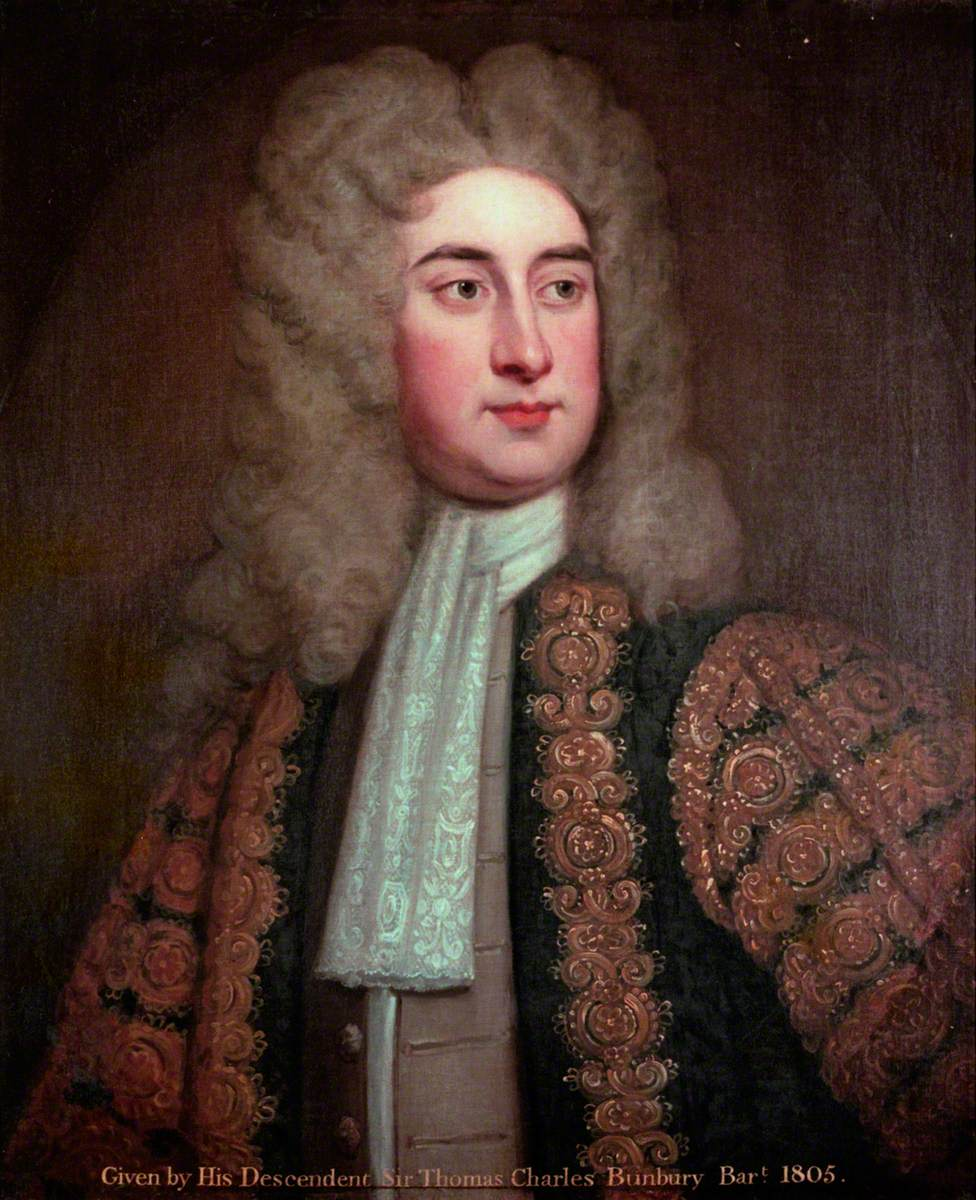
Sir Thomas Hanmer.

Sir Thomas Hanmer, 4th Baronet (24 September 1677 – 7 May 1746) was Speaker of the House of Commons of Great Britain from 1714 to 1715, discharging the duties of the office with conspicuous impartiality. His second marriage was the subject of much gossip as his wife eloped with his cousin Thomas Hervey and lived openly with him for the rest of her days. He is, however, perhaps best remembered as being one of the early editors of the works of William Shakespeare.

He was identified with the Hanoverian Tory faction at the time of the Hanoverian Succession in 1714.

== Life ==
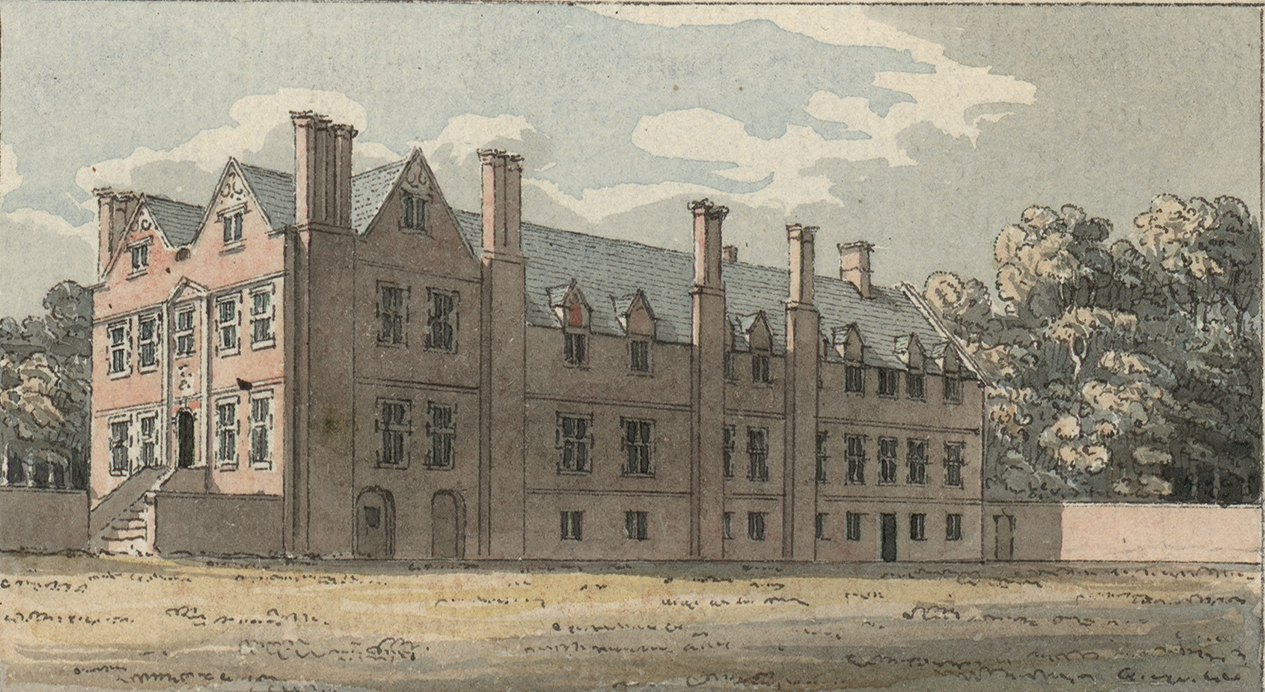
Hanmer was born at Bettisfield in North Wales

He was the son of William Hanmer (born ca. 1648, Angers, France, died ca. 1678?, (Note: Venn & Venn 1922, p. 299 state that William was aged 15 when he entered Pembroke College, Oxford on 17 July 1663, so he was probably born c. 1648. Bunbury 1838, p. 4 says that William predeceased his father Thomas, the 2nd Baronet (1612–1678). William thus may have been under 30 when he died. Thomas was born in 1677.) the son of Sir Thomas Hanmer, 2nd Baronet), and of Peregrine, daughter and co-heiress of Sir Henry North, 1st Baronet, of Mildenhall, Suffolk.

He was born between 10 and 11 p.m. in the house of his grandfather Sir Thomas Hanmer, 2nd Baronet, at Bettisfield Park, near Wrexham, Clwyd, Wales (formerly Flintshire).

His father, William, seems to have died early, and Thomas was educated in Bury St Edmunds, (Note: His grandmother Susan, wife of Sir Thomas Hanmer, 2nd Baronet, was the daughter of William Hervey, MP for Bury St Edmunds.) at Westminster School and Christ Church, Oxford, matriculating on 17 October 1693, age 17. His tutor was Robert Freind, D.D., who was later under-master at Westminster in 1699, and headmaster 1711–1733.

Hanmer gained his LL.D., however, Com. Reg. (Note: Comitia Regia: a 'commencement' (or comitia maxima) held at Cambridge University on the occasion of a royal visit, characterised, especially in the seventeenth and eighteenth centuries, by the conferring of 'mandate degrees' (degrees conferred in response to instructions issued by the crown or, on the occasion of royal visits, by the chancellor) on a huge number of persons at a moment’s notice. In the 19th century, the expression ‘Commencement’ was applied to a congregation on the penultimate Tuesday in June, when prize exercises were recited (see prolusions) and all M.A.s and Doctors in all faculties were created. Source: 'Glossary of Cambridge terminology'. Janus.lib.ac.uk. Accessed 22 December 2015.) from Cambridge University in 1705.

He succeeded as 4th Baronet in 1701, when his uncle, the 3rd Baronet Sir John Hanmer, died in a duel leaving no issue.

He was a high church Tory M.P. for Thetford in 1701–02 and 1705–08; for Flintshire in 1702–05; and for Suffolk in 1708–27. (Note: After his mother Peregrine died, he inherited her Mildenhall estate.) He led the Tory rebels who sided against the Harley ministry to defeat the French commerce bill in June 1713.

He was unanimously elected Speaker of the House of Commons in February 1714, during the last Tory government for over 100 years; the Tory party was split between those (like Hanmer) who wished to maintain the Protestant succession in Britain, and those with Jacobite tendencies who supported James Stuart, the 'Old Pretender' of the Jacobite succession. After the death of Queen Anne in August 1714, George I brought in a government composed entirely of Whigs. The House of Commons was dissolved in January 1715, and Hanmer was not put forward for re-election: in his stead Spencer Compton (later 1st Earl of Wilmington and Prime Minister) was elected Speaker on 17 March 1715, although Hannmer continued to serve as an MP until 1727. The History of Parliament. Accessed 22 December 2015.</ref> The Tory party was proscribed from government office until 1760 and the accession of George III.

He was one of the founding governors of the Foundling Hospital, a charity set up for London's abandoned children in 1739, which also became a centre for the arts.

He also built and endowed a home for the impoverished elderly in Mildenhall, his mother's home village, in 1722. The home, called Bunbury Rooms for his brother-in-law and biographer Henry Edward Bunbury, serves a similar purpose today.

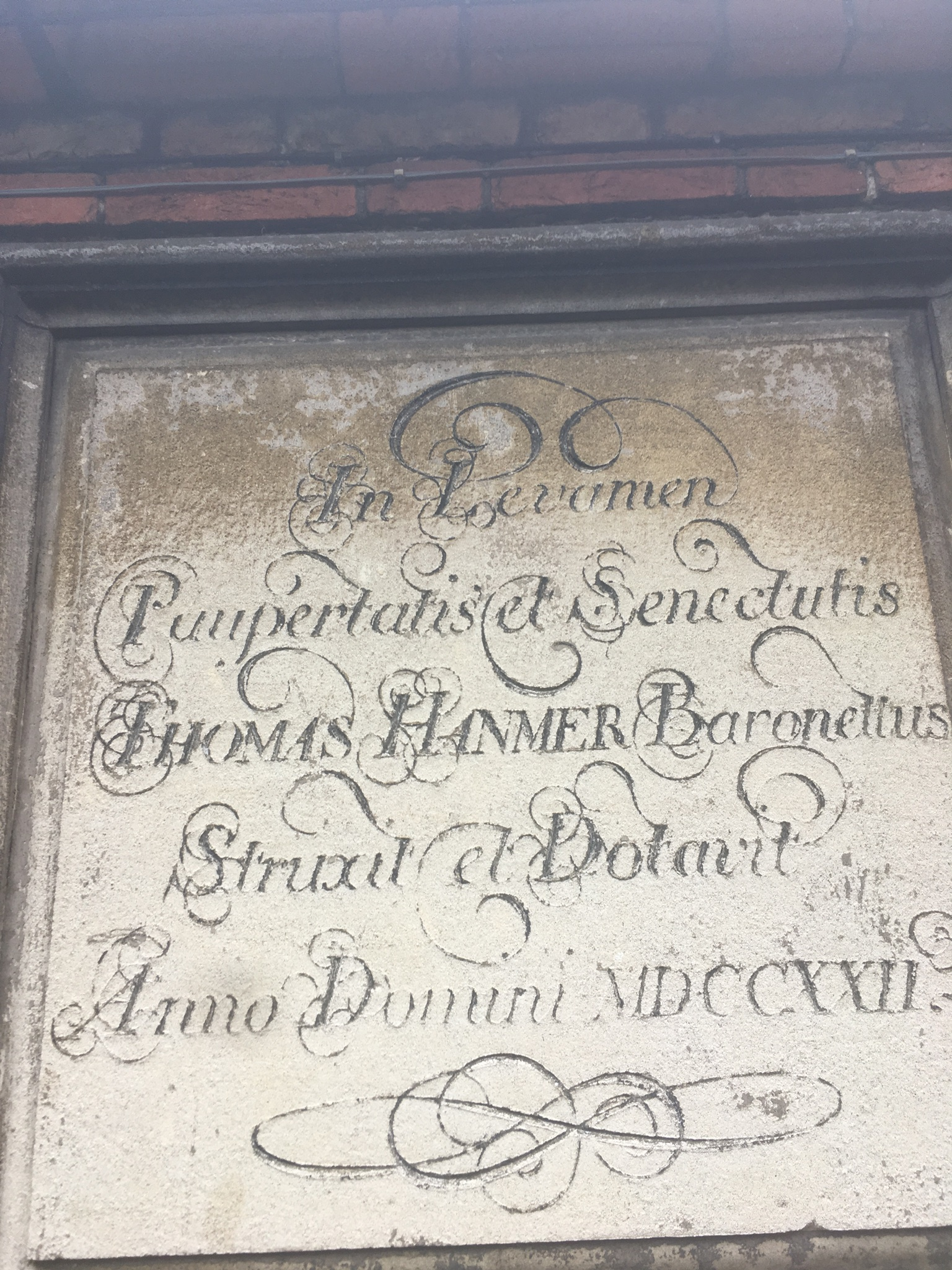
Trans; in alleviation of poverty and old age Baronet Thomas Hanmer built and endowed AD 1722

== Literary activities ==
Hanmer's Shakespeare was published at Oxford in 1743–44, with nearly forty illustrations by Francis Hayman and Hubert Gravelot. The Cambridge History of English and American Literature states that "The print and binding were magnificent, and caused its value to rise to nine guineas, when Warburton’s edition was going for eighteen shillings."

Hanmer's editing, however, was based on his own selection of emendations from the Shakespeare editions of Alexander Pope and Lewis Theobald, along with his own conjectures, without indicating for the reader what was in his source texts and what was editorially corrected. Therefore, Hanmer's edition is not highly regarded today, with the editors of The Oxford Shakespeare assessing it in William Shakespeare: A Textual Companion as "one of the worst in the eighteenth century."

Also, Hanmer became the target of ridicule by Pope, who in his Dunciad lampoons him under the name Montalto (Book IV, 105ff.) and refers to him in a note (IV 113) as "An eminent person, who was about to publish a very pompous Edition of a great Author, at his own expense" (emphasis original).

However, there are some emendations of value that were made by Hanmer which have been accepted into later editions of Shakespeare.

== Marriages and scandal ==
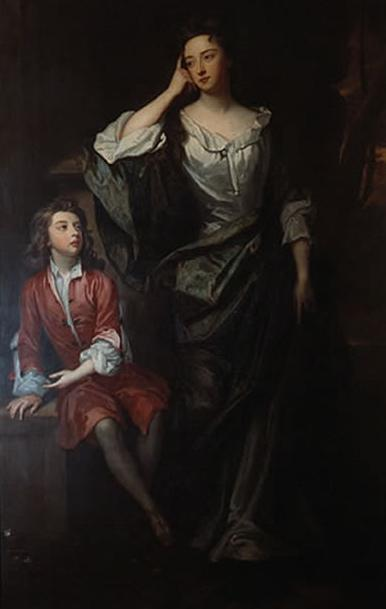
Hanmer's first wife, Isabella, Dowager Duchess of Grafton, with her son, Charles, 2nd Duke of Grafton

He died in 1746 and was buried at Hanmer. He had married firstly in 1698 Isabella FitzRoy, Duchess of Grafton, the daughter and heiress of Henry Bennet, 1st Earl of Arlington, and widow of Henry Fitzroy, 1st Duke of Grafton, natural son of King Charles II. She died in 1723.

He married secondly, in 1725, to Elizabeth Folkes, only daughter of Thomas Folkes, of Great Barton, Suffolk. Elizabeth was much younger than her husband and the couple were ill-suited; in particular, she did not share his love of Shakespeare. She caused a notable scandal a few years later by eloping with his cousin Thomas Hervey, younger son of John Hervey, 1st Earl of Bristol, by whom she had a son Thomas. Hervey, who was often said to be insane, subjected Hanmer to years of persecution over property which allegedly belonged to Elizabeth. Hanmer maintained that Elizabeth's father had settled the property strictly on his son-in-law, and that Elizabeth had no right to it. She died in 1741. Hanmer on his side threatened to "prosecute" Hervey (presumably he meant that he would bring a civil action for criminal conversation) but nothing seems to have come of it.

He had no heir by either marriage and so the baronetcy became extinct.

== See also ==
- Shakespeare's editors

Political offices
Preceded by William Bromley	Speaker of the House of Commons of Great Britain; 1714–1715	Succeeded by Spencer Compton
Baronetage of England
Preceded by John Hanmer	Baronet (of Hanmer); 1701–1746	Extinct
