= Sackville Trevor =

Sir Sackville Trevor (c. 1565–1633) was an Anglo-Welsh vice-admiral and politician who sat in the House of Commons in 1625.

Sackville Trevor was son of John Trevor of Trevalyn, Denbighshire, and the brother of Sir Richard Trevor, Sir John Trevor and Sir Thomas Trevor. He served with distinction under Admiral Howard of Effingham, and was knighted on 4 July 1604. He accompanied the future King Charles I to Spain in 1623.

He was elected Member of Parliament for Anglesey in 1625. He was involved in the La Rochelle expedition of 1627.

Trevor married Lady Eleanor Bagnell, widow of Sir Henry Bagnall and daughter of Sir John Savage of Clifton Cheshire.

Parliament of England
Preceded by John Mostyn	Member of Parliament for Anglesey; 1625	Succeeded by Richard Bulkeley
