= Sir John Hanmer, 3rd Baronet =

Welsh politician

Sir John Hanmer, 3rd Baronet (died August 1701) was a Welsh politician who sat in the House of Commons at various times between 1659 and 1690.

Hanmer was the son of Sir Thomas Hanmer, 2nd Baronet of Hanmer and his first wife Elizabeth Baker. In 1659, he was elected Member of Parliament for Flint in the Third Protectorate Parliament. He was knighted on 9 August 1660 and was High Sheriff of Gloucestershire from 1664 to 1665.

In October 1669, he was elected MP for Evesham for the Cavalier Parliament. He succeeded to the Baronetcy on the death of his father in 1678. In 1681 he was elected MP for Flintshire. He was elected MP for Flint again in 1685. He became a colonel of the 11th Foot in 1688. In 1689 he was elected MP for Flint again. He became a major-general in the Army and was colonel of the 11th Foot, serving King William III at the Battle of the Boyne in 1690.

Hanmer married Mary Alston, daughter of Joseph Alston, of Netherhall, Suffolk. He died in 1701, probably killed in a duel and left no issue; he was succeeded in the baronetcy by his nephew Thomas, the son of his younger brother William who had already predeceased their father, the 2nd Baronet.

Parliament of England
Preceded by Not represented in Second Protectorate Parliament	Member of Parliament for Flint; 1659	Succeeded by Not represented in Restored Rump
Preceded by William Sandys; Abraham Cullen	Member of Parliament for Evesham; 1669–1679; With: William Sandys 1669–1670; Sir James Rushout 1670–1679	Succeeded by Sir James Rushout; Henry Parker
Preceded by Mutton Davies	Member of Parliament for Flintshire; 1681–1685	Succeeded by Sir John Conway
Preceded by Thomas Whitley	Member of Parliament for Flint; 1685–1690	Succeeded by Thomas Whitley
Parliament of Ireland
Preceded by Elnathan Lum; Zaccheus Sedgwick	Member of Parliament for Carlingford; 1695–1699; With: Zaccheus Sedgwick 1695; Elnathan Lum 1695–1699	Succeeded by Charles Dering; Arthur Hill
Military offices
Preceded by Viscount Montgomery	Colonel of Hanmer's Regiment of Foot; 1688–1701	Succeeded by James Stanhope
Honorary titles
Preceded by William Cooke	High Sheriff of Gloucestershire; 1665	Succeeded by Sir Richard Cocks
Baronetage of England
Preceded by Thomas Hanmer	Baronet (of Hanmer); 1678–1701	Succeeded by Thomas Hanmer
