= Sir John Hanmer, 1st Baronet =

English politician (1590–1624)

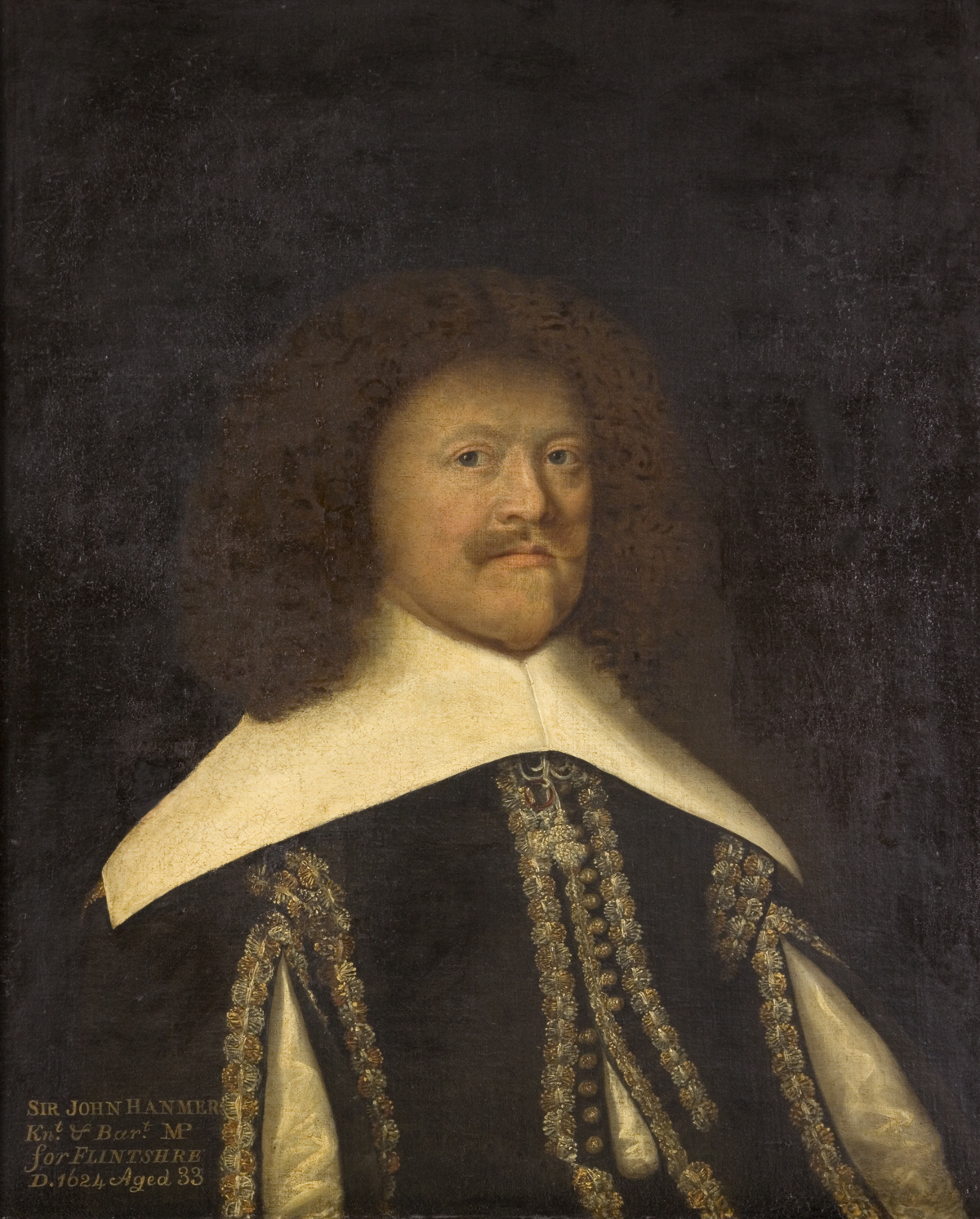
A painting of John Hanmer by Cornelis Janssens van Ceulen

Sir John Hanmer, 1st Baronet (1590–1624) was an English politician who sat in the House of Commons in 1624.

Hanmer was the eldest son of Sir Thomas Hanmer, who was MP for Flintshire in 1593.

He was a member of the Council of Wales and the Marches, and was a leader of the Puritan party. He was created baronet on 8 July 1620.

In 1624, Hanmer was elected Member of Parliament for Flintshire. He died later in the year at the age of 33.

Hanmer married Dorothy Trevor, daughter of Sir Richard Trevor of Allington. His son Thomas succeeded to the baronetcy and was also MP for Flint and Flintshire.

Parliament of England
Preceded by Sir Roger Mostyn	Member of Parliament for Flintshire; 1624	Succeeded by Sir John Trevor
Baronetage of England
New title	Baronet (of Hanmer); 1620–1624	Succeeded by Thomas Hanmer
