= John Trevor (1596–1673) =

Welsh landowner and politician

Sir John Trevor II (1596–1673) was a Puritan Welsh landowner and politician who sat in the House of Commons at various times between 1621 and 1659. He supported the Parliamentarian cause in the English Civil War and was a member of the Council of State during the Commonwealth.

== Early life ==
Trevor, whose father Sir John Trevor I was Surveyor of the Navy under Elizabeth I and James I, was born at Oatlands Palace, of which his father was Keeper, on 21 August 1596. He was knighted in 1619. In 1621 he was elected Member of Parliament for Denbighshire. He was elected MP for Flintshire in the Parliaments of 1624 and 1625. In 1628 he was elected MP for Great Bedwyn and sat until 1629 when King Charles decided to rule without parliament for eleven years. During the Personal Rule of Charles I, he was a member of several Royal Commissions, and amassed a substantial income: he had inherited from his father a share in the duties levied on coal from Newcastle, said to bring in £1,500 a year, and held the keepership of several Royal forests, all lucrative sinecures. (At one period he was Surveyor of Windsor Great Park.) He inherited Plas Teg on the death of his father in 1630 and subsequently inherited Trevalyn Hall on the death of his uncle Richard Trevor in 1638.

== Civil war and Commonwealth ==
In November 1640 Trevor was elected MP for Grampound in the Long Parliament, having connections with Cornwall through his mother, a Trevanion. He took the parliamentary side during the Civil War, and he was sufficiently supportive of the trial of the King to survive Pride's Purge and sit in the Rump. He seems to have been accepted as the spokesman for North Wales in many of the administrative committees that took over the country after the overthrow of the Monarchy, being twice elected to the Council of State, and also serving on the Committee of Both Kingdoms from 1648. However, he was not a member of the smaller council established after Cromwell assumed the Protectorate in 1653. In 1656 Trevor was elected MP for Arundel in the Second Protectorate Parliament, and was one of those advocating the offer of the Crown to Cromwell (to whom he was related by his son's marriage to John Hampden's daughter, Ruth). He was elected MP for Steyning in 1659 for the Third Protectorate Parliament.

== Restoration ==
Although he resumed his seat at Grampound in 1659 in the restored Rump after Richard Cromwell's fall, he was an early supporter of the Restoration of Charles II, which ensured that he suffered no penalties for his earlier political loyalties after the King returned, being granted a royal pardon on 24 July 1660. However, he had invested much of his fortune during the Commonwealth in buying up lands confiscated from convicted Royalists, and suffered considerable loss as a result.

== Family ==
Trevor's son, also called Sir John Trevor (1626–1672), was an MP with his father during the Commonwealth, and after the Restoration rose to become Secretary of State in 1668.

Parliament of England
Preceded by Simon Thelwall	Member of Parliament for Denbighshire; 1621–1622	Succeeded by Sir Eubulus Thelwall
Preceded by Sir John Hanmer, 1st Baronet	Member of Parliament for Flintshire; 1624–1625	Succeeded by John Salusbury
Preceded by John Selden; Sir Maurice Berkeley	Member of Parliament for Great Bedwyn; 1628–1629; With: Edward Kyrton	Parliament suspended until 1640
Preceded by William Coryton; James Campbell	Member of Parliament for Grampound; 1640–1653; With: James Campbell 1640–1648	Not represented in Barebones Parliament
Preceded by Anthony Shirley	Member of Parliament for Arundel; 1656	Succeeded by Henry Onslow; Richard Marriot
Vacant Not represented in Second Protectorate Parliament	Member of Parliament for Steyning; 1659; With: Anthony Shirley	Not represented in Restored Rump
Preceded by Thomas Herle; Robert Scawen	Member of Parliament for Grampound; 1659	Succeeded by Thomas Herle; Hugh Boscawen
