= Richard Grosvenor, 1st Baron Stalbridge =

British politician and businessman

The Right Honourable The Lord Stalbridge PC
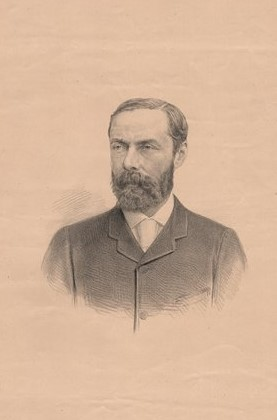

Vice-Chamberlain of the Household
- In office 25 February 1872 – 17 February 1874
- Monarch: Victoria
- Prime Minister: William Ewart Gladstone
- Preceded by: Viscount Castlerosse
- Succeeded by: The Viscount Barrington

Parliamentary Secretary to the Treasury
- In office 28 April 1880 – 9 June 1885
- Monarch: Victoria
- Prime Minister: William Ewart Gladstone
- Preceded by: Sir William Hart Dyke, Bt
- Succeeded by: Areas Akers-Douglas

Personal details
- Born: 28 January 1837
- Died: 18 May 1912 (aged 75) London
- Party: Liberal Party; Liberal Unionist
- Spouse(s): (1) Hon. Beatrice Vesey (d. 1876) (2) Eleanor Hamilton-Stubber (d. 1911)
- Education: Trinity College, Cambridge

Richard de Aquila Grosvenor, 1st Baron Stalbridge, PC (28 January 1837 – 18 May 1912), styled Lord Richard Grosvenor between 1845 and 1886, was a British politician and businessman. Initially a Liberal, he served under William Ewart Gladstone as Vice-Chamberlain of the Household between 1872 and 1874 and as Parliamentary Secretary to the Treasury between 1880 and 1885. However, he broke with Gladstone over Irish Home Rule in 1886 and joined the Liberal Unionists.

== Background and education ==
Grosvenor was the fourth but second surviving son of Richard Grosvenor, 2nd Marquess of Westminster, and Lady Elizabeth Mary, daughter of George Leveson-Gower, 1st Duke of Sutherland. Hugh Grosvenor, 1st Duke of Westminster, was his elder brother. He was educated at Westminster School and admitted on 24 January 1849 to Trinity College, Cambridge, matriculating in 1855, he was awarded MA graduation in 1858. During an adventurous youth, he toured the western United States and was present at the sack of the Summer Palace during the Second Opium War.

On 20 April 1858, he was commissioned a lieutenant in the Dorsetshire Yeomanry and promoted to lieutenant-colonel on 19 July 1866. He succeeded Lord Digby as lieutenant-colonel commandant on 20 September 1870.

== Political career ==
Grosvenor was Liberal Party Member of Parliament for Flintshire from 1861 until 1886. On 19 March 1872 he was sworn of the Privy Council and appointed Vice-Chamberlain of the Household by William Ewart Gladstone, a post he held until the government fell in 1874. When the Liberals returned to power in 1880 under Gladstone, Grosvenor was made Patronage Secretary to the Treasury, as the Chief Whip was known. He remained in this post until 1885, but disagreed with Gladstone over Irish Home Rule and resigned his seat in protest (by accepting appointment as a Steward of the Chiltern Hundreds in 1886. He was subsequently raised to the peerage on 22 March 1886 as Baron Stalbridge, of Stalbridge in the County of Dorset, and became a leader of the Liberal Unionist Party from the House of Lords.

== Later life ==
On 15 April 1882, Grosvenor resigned his command of the Dorsetshire Yeomanry Cavalry and was appointed honorary colonel of the regiment, a post he held until 1895. In 1891, he was appointed chairman of the London and North Western Railway, of which he had been a director since 1870 and had eagerly promoted. In 1867 he was prompted by Emperor Napoleon III to head an international committee to promote a populist view of a Channel Tunnel, which contemplated a submarine railway between England and France. In 1895 he established the LNWR Savings Bank, which became the main sponsor of a new ambulance centre for the St John's Ambulance Association in Manchester.

He had inherited Motcombe House in 1891. The house was demolished after he contracted typhoid fever in 1894 and a new house built in 1895. However, much of the estate was sold off in 1905 to raise money, when the family moved to London. Lord Stalbridge had, in 1887, agreed to pay off some of the debts of Liberal peer, Lord Sudeley, and the resulting financial entanglement severely reduced his wealth.

== Family ==
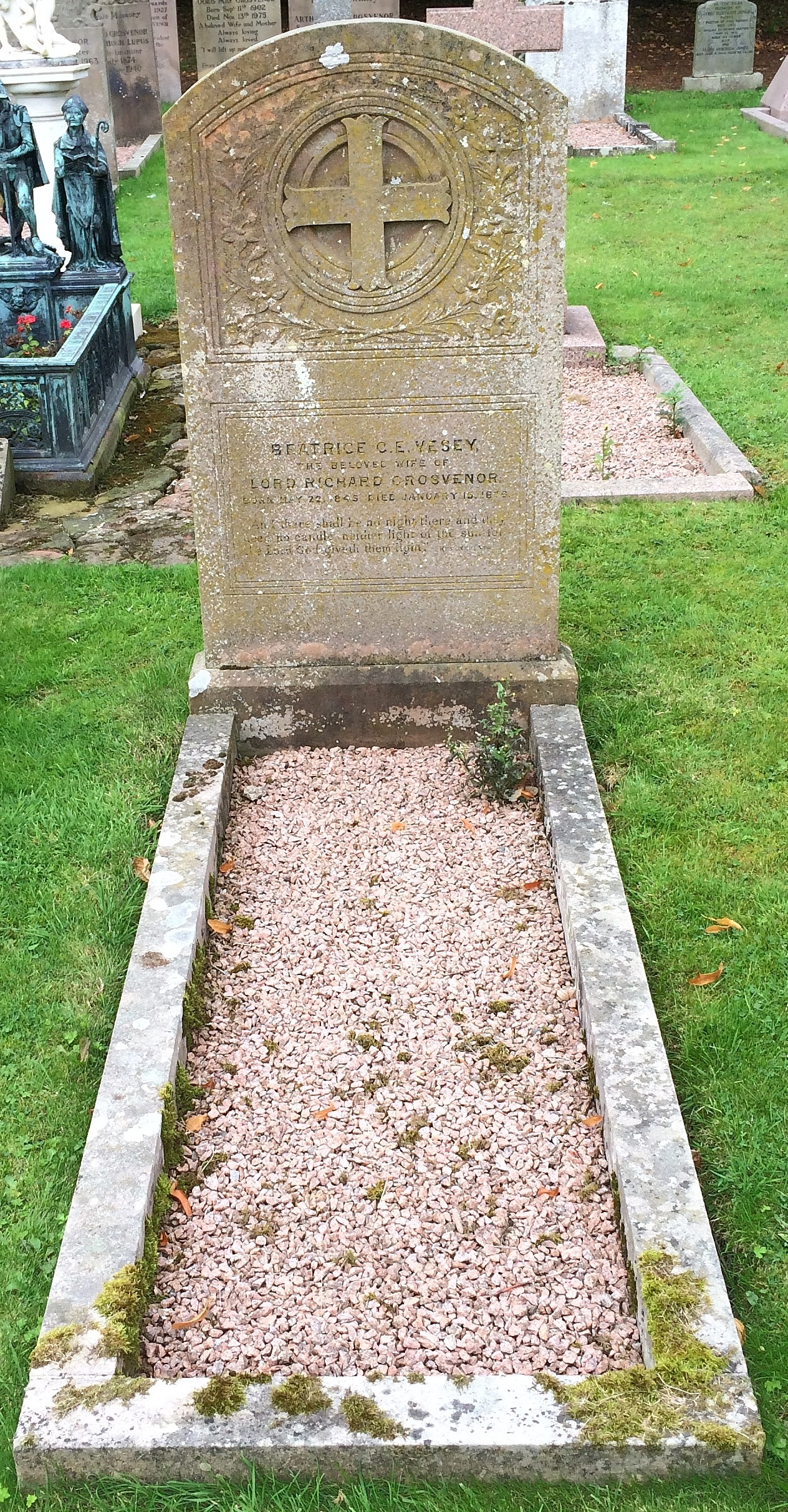
Grave of Beatrice Charlotte Elizabeth (née Vesey), first wife of Richard Grosvenor, 1st Baron Stalbridge

Lord Stalbridge married at Westminster Abbey on 5 November 1874, as his first wife the Hon. Beatrice Charlotte Elizabeth Vesey, third and youngest daughter of Thomas Vesey, 3rd Viscount de Vesci, by Emma, youngest daughter of the 11th Earl of Pembroke. She died of pleurisy in Brook Street in 1876, shortly after the birth of their only child:

- Hon. Elizabeth Emma Beatrice Grosvenor (1875–1931), who on 1 June 1899 married Aubrey Clare Hugh Smith, RN, who later became an admiral.

Stalbridge married his second wife on 3 April 1879, Eleanor Frances Beatrice (d.1911), younger daughter of Robert Hamilton-Stubber of Moyne, Queens County, by Olivia, daughter of the Rev Edward Lucas. They had five children:

- Hugh Grosvenor, 2nd Baron Stalbridge (1880–1949), twin
- Hon. Blanche Grosvenor (1880–1964), twin, married Lieutenant-Colonel James Holford
- Hon. Gilbert Grosvenor (1881–1939), married Effie E. Cree; no issue
- Captain Hon. Richard Eustace Grosvenor, MC (1883–1915), killed in the First World War
- Hon. Eleanor Lilian Grosvenor (1885–1977), married Major Josceline Grant; mother of Elspeth Huxley

Lady Stalbridge died on 21 March 1911 at 22 Sussex Square, and was buried on 25 March at Motcombe. Lord Stalbridge survived her by about a year and died at his London home on 18 May 1912, aged 75. He was succeeded in the barony by his eldest son, Hugh. His will was probated in July 1912 at £5,863 gross, and £2,849 net.

== Arms ==
Coat of arms of Richard Grosvenor, 1st Baron Stalbridge
Coronet A coronet of an Baron Crest A talbot statant or. Escutcheon Azure, a garb or; a crescent for difference. Supporters Two talbots reguardant or, collared azure and charged on the shoulder with a crescent of the second. Motto Virtus non stemma. (Virtue, not ancestry)

Parliament of the United Kingdom
Preceded by Thomas Lloyd-Mostyn	Member of Parliament for Flintshire; 1861–1886	Succeeded by Samuel Smith
Political offices
Preceded by Viscount Castlerosse	Vice-Chamberlain of the Household; 1872–1874	Succeeded by The Viscount Barrington
Preceded by Sir William Hart Dyke, Bt	Parliamentary Secretary to the Treasury; 1880–1885	Succeeded by Aretas Akers-Douglas
Military offices
Preceded by The Lord Digby	Lieutenant-Colonel Commandant of the Dorsetshire Yeomanry (Queen's Own); 1870–1882	Succeeded by Charles J. T. Hambro
Business positions
Preceded by Sir Richard Moon	Chairman of the London and North Western Railway; 1891–1911	Succeeded by Gilbert Claughton
Peerage of the United Kingdom
New creation	Baron Stalbridge; 1886–1912	Succeeded by Hugh Grosvenor
