= Flintshire (UK Parliament constituency) =

UK Parliament constituency (1801–1950)

- Former county constituency for the House of Commons
- Preserved county: Flintshire

1542–1950
- Seats: One
- Replaced by: East Flintshire and West Flintshire

Flintshire was a parliamentary constituency in North-East Wales which generally returned one Member of Parliament (MP) to the House of Commons, latterly that of the Parliament of the United Kingdom, from 1542 until it was abolished for the 1950 general election.

== Boundaries ==
From its creation in 1542 until 1918, the constituency consisted of the historic county of Flintshire in north-east Wales. The seat should not be confused with the borough constituency of Flint or that of Flint Boroughs, which together existed from the 16th century until 1918.

In 1889 an administrative county of Flintshire was created. This formed the basis of the constituency which existed from 1918 until 1950, when the county was split between East and West divisions.

== Members of Parliament ==
=== Before 1604 ===
Parliament	Member
1545	Peter Mostyn
1547	George Wood
1553 (Mar)	Sir Thomas Hanmer
1553 (Oct)	Robert Massey
1554 (Apr)	William Mostyn
1554 (Nov)	William Mostyn
1555	Robert Massey
1558	John Conway
1559	John Griffith
1562–3	George Ravenscroft
1571	John Griffith
1572	William Mostyn, died and replaced Feb 1577 by Thomas Mostyn
1584	John Hope
1586	William Ravenscroft
1588	Roger Puleston
1593	Thomas Hanmer
1597	William Ravenscroft
1601	William Ravenscroft

=== 1604–1950 ===
Year	Member
1604	Roger Puleston
1614	Robert Ravenscroft
1621	Sir Roger Mostyn
1624	Sir John Hanmer, 1st Baronet died and replaced 1624 by Sir John Trevor
1625	Sir John Trevor
1626	John Salusbury
1628	Robert Jones
1629–1640	No Parliaments summoned
1640	John Mostyn
1640	John Mostyn, disabled 1643
1646	John Trevor
1653	Flintshire not represented in Barebones Parliament

Year	First Member	Second Member
Two members in first and second Protectorate Parliaments
1654	John Trevor	Andrew Ellice
1656	John Trevor	Sir John Glynne

Year	Name	Party
1659	John Trevor	
1660	Kenrick Eyton	
1661	Sir Henry Conway	
1669	Sir Thomas Hanmer	
1678	Mutton Davies	
1681	Sir John Hanmer, 3rd Baronet	
1685	Sir John Conway	
1689	Sir Roger Puleston	Whig
1695	Sir John Conway	Tory
1701	Sir Roger Mostyn	Tory
1702	Sir Thomas Hanmer	Tory
1705	Sir John Conway	Tory
1708	Sir Roger Mostyn	Tory
1713	Sir John Conway	Tory
1715	Sir Roger Mostyn	
1734	Sir Thomas Mostyn, 4th Baronet	
1741	Sir John Glynne	
1747	Sir Thomas Mostyn, 4th Baronet	
1758	Sir Roger Mostyn	
1796	Sir Thomas Mostyn	Whig
1797	John Lloyd	Tory
1799	Sir Thomas Mostyn	Whig
1831	Edward Lloyd-Mostyn	Whig
1837	Sir Stephen Glynne	Conservative
1841	Edward Lloyd-Mostyn	Whig
1842 by-election	Sir Stephen Glynne	Conservative
1847	Edward Lloyd-Mostyn	Whig
1854 by-election	Thomas Lloyd-Mostyn	Whig
1859	Thomas Lloyd-Mostyn	Liberal
1861 by-election	Lord Richard Grosvenor	Liberal
1886 by-election	Samuel Smith	Liberal
1906	Herbert Lewis	Liberal
1916	Herbert Lewis	Coalition Liberal
1918	Tom Parry	Coalition Liberal
1922	Tom Parry	National Liberal
1923	Tom Parry	Liberal
1924	Ernest Roberts	Conservative
1929	Frederick Llewellyn-Jones	Liberal
1931	Frederick Llewellyn-Jones	Liberal National
1932	Frederick Llewellyn-Jones	Liberal
1935	Gwilym Rowlands	Conservative
1945	Nigel Birch	Conservative
Constituency divided into East and West Flintshire in 1950

== Elections ==
=== Elections in the 1830s ===
General election 1830: Flintshire
Party	Candidate	Votes	%
Whig	Thomas Mostyn	Unopposed	
Registered electors		c. 1,200	
Whig hold			

General election 1831: Flintshire
Party	Candidate	Votes	%
Whig	Edward Lloyd-Mostyn	Unopposed	
Registered electors		c. 1,200	
Whig hold			

General election 1832: Flintshire
Party	Candidate	Votes	%
Whig	Edward Lloyd-Mostyn	Unopposed	
Registered electors		1,271	
Whig hold			

General election 1835: Flintshire
Party	Candidate	Votes	%
Whig	Edward Lloyd-Mostyn	Unopposed	
Registered electors		1,344	
Whig hold			

General election 1837: Flintshire
Party	Candidate	Votes	%
Conservative	Stephen Glynne	945	51.1
Whig	Edward Lloyd-Mostyn	905	48.9
Majority		40	2.2
Turnout		1,850	84.5
Registered electors		2,189	
Conservative gain from Whig			

=== Elections in the 1840s ===
General election 1841: Flintshire
Party	Candidate	Votes	%	±%
Whig	Edward Lloyd-Mostyn	1,234	50.9	+2.0
Conservative	Stephen Glynne	1,192	49.1	−2.0
Majority		42	1.8	N/A
Turnout		2,426	81.9	−2.6
Registered electors		2,963		
Whig gain from Conservative		Swing	+2.0	

Following the election, Lloyd-Mostyn's election was declared void and Glynne was elected after scrutiny on 23 May 1842.

General election 1847: Flintshire
Party	Candidate	Votes	%	±%
Whig	Edward Lloyd-Mostyn	Unopposed		
Registered electors		3,141		
Whig hold				

=== Elections in the 1850s ===
General election 1852: Flintshire
Party	Candidate	Votes	%	±%
Whig	Edward Lloyd-Mostyn	1,276	58.4	N/A
Conservative	Edmund Peel	910	41.6	New
Majority		366	16.8	N/A
Turnout		2,186	75.1	N/A
Registered electors		2,912		
Whig hold		Swing	N/A	

Lloyd-Mostyn succeeded to the peerage, becoming 2nd Baron Mostyn and causing a by-election.

By-election, 8 May 1854: Flintshire
Party	Candidate	Votes	%	±%
Whig	Thomas Lloyd-Mostyn	Unopposed		
Whig hold				

General election 1857: Flintshire
Party	Candidate	Votes	%	±%
Whig	Thomas Lloyd-Mostyn	1,171	57.2	−1.2
Conservative	Stephen Glynne	876	42.8	+1.2
Majority		295	14.4	−2.4
Turnout		2,047	72.1	−3.0
Registered electors		2,840		
Whig hold		Swing	−1.2	

General election 1859: Flintshire
Party	Candidate	Votes	%	±%
Liberal	Thomas Lloyd-Mostyn	Unopposed		
Registered electors		2,896		
Liberal hold				

=== Elections in the 1860s ===
Mostyn's death caused a by-election.

By-election, 30 May 1861: Flintshire
Party	Candidate	Votes	%	±%
Liberal	Richard Grosvenor	1,168	57.4	N/A
Conservative	Hugh Robert Hughes	868	42.6	New
Majority		300	14.8	N/A
Turnout		2,036	70.5	N/A
Registered electors		2,887		
Liberal hold				

General election 1865: Flintshire
Party	Candidate	Votes	%	±%
Liberal	Richard Grosvenor	Unopposed		
Registered electors		2,998		
Liberal hold				

General election 1868: Flintshire
Party	Candidate	Votes	%	±%
Liberal	Richard Grosvenor	Unopposed		
Registered electors		4,150		
Liberal hold				

=== Elections in the 1870s ===
Grosvenor was appointed Vice-Chamberlain of the Household, requiring a by-election.

By-election, 2 Mar 1872: Flintshire
Party	Candidate	Votes	%	±%
Liberal	Richard Grosvenor	Unopposed		
Liberal hold				

General election 1874: Flintshire
Party	Candidate	Votes	%	±%
Liberal	Richard Grosvenor	Unopposed		
Registered electors		3,907		
Liberal hold				

=== Elections in the 1880s ===
General election 1880: Flintshire
Party	Candidate	Votes	%	±%
Liberal	Richard Grosvenor	Unopposed		
Registered electors		4,794		
Liberal hold				

General election 1885: Flintshire
Party	Candidate	Votes	%	±%
Liberal	Richard Grosvenor	4,758	60.3	N/A
Conservative	Henry Richard Howel Lloyd-Mostyn	3,132	39.7	New
Majority		1,626	20.6	N/A
Turnout		7,890	78.3	N/A
Registered electors		10,081		
Liberal hold		Swing	N/A	

Grosvenor's resignation caused a by-election.

Samuel Smith

By-election, 2 Mar 1886: Flintshire
Party	Candidate	Votes	%	±%
Liberal	Samuel Smith	4,248	60.8	+0.5
Conservative	Philip Pennant Pennant	2,738	39.2	−0.5
Majority		1,510	21.6	+1.0
Turnout		6,986	69.3	−9.0
Registered electors		10,081		
Liberal hold		Swing	+0.5	

General election 1886: Flintshire
Party	Candidate	Votes	%	±%
Liberal	Samuel Smith	Unopposed		
Liberal hold				

=== Elections in the 1890s ===
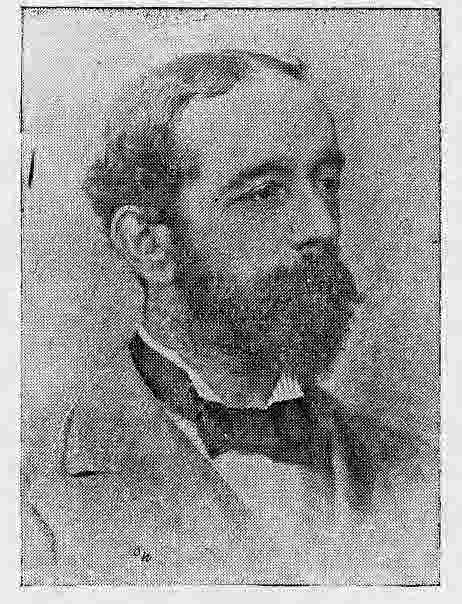
Robert Cunliffe

General election 1892: Flintshire
Party	Candidate	Votes	%	±%
Liberal	Samuel Smith	4,597	59.4	N/A
Liberal Unionist	Robert Cunliffe	3,145	40.6	New
Majority		1,452	18.8	N/A
Turnout		7,742	76.8	N/A
Registered electors		10,075		
Liberal hold		Swing	N/A	

General election 1895: Flintshire
Party	Candidate	Votes	%	±%
Liberal	Samuel Smith	4,376	52.7	−6.7
Conservative	Henry Richard Lloyd Howard	3,925	47.3	+6.7
Majority		451	5.4	−13.4
Turnout		8,301	78.4	+1.6
Registered electors		10,592		
Liberal hold		Swing	-6.7	

=== Elections in the 1900s ===
Smith

General election 1900: Flintshire
Party	Candidate	Votes	%	±%
Liberal	Samuel Smith	4,528	53.6	+0.9
Conservative	Henry Howard	3,922	46.4	−0.9
Majority		606	7.2	+1.8
Turnout		8,450	78.4	0.0
Registered electors		10,774		
Liberal hold		Swing	+0.9	

Herbert Lewis

General election 1906: Flintshire
Party	Candidate	Votes	%	±%
Liberal	Herbert Lewis	6,294	63.8	+10.2
Conservative	Harold Edwards	3,572	36.2	−10.2
Majority		2,722	27.6	+20.4
Turnout		9,866	83.0	+4.6
Registered electors		11,892		
Liberal hold		Swing	+10.2	

=== Elections in the 1910s ===
General election January 1910: Flintshire
Party	Candidate	Votes	%	±%
Liberal	Herbert Lewis	6,610	59.7	−4.1
Conservative	Henry Howard	4,454	40.3	+4.1
Majority		2,156	19.4	−8.2
Turnout		11,064	86.6	+3.6
Registered electors		12,774		
Liberal hold		Swing	-4.1	

General election December 1910: Flintshire
Party	Candidate	Votes	%	±%
Liberal	Herbert Lewis	Unopposed		
Liberal hold				

General Election 1914–15: Another General Election was due to take place before the end of 1915. From 1914, the parties had been making preparations for an election, and by the end of that year, the following candidates had been selected:

- Liberal: Herbert Lewis
- Unionist: D. F. Pennant

The constituency was then merged with Flint Boroughs.

Thomas Parry

General election 1918: Flintshire
Party		Candidate	Votes	%	±%
C	National Liberal	Tom Parry	Unopposed		
	National Liberal hold				
C indicates candidate endorsed by the coalition government.

=== Elections in the 1920s ===
General election 1922: Flintshire
Party	Candidate	Votes	%	±%
National Liberal	Tom Parry	16,854	44.2	N/A
Unionist	Austin Lloyd Jones	15,080	39.6	New
Labour	David Gwynfryn Jones	6,163	16.2	New
Majority		1,774	4.6	N/A
Turnout		38,097	79.4	N/A
National Liberal hold		Swing	N/A	

General election 1923: Flintshire
Party	Candidate	Votes	%	±%
Liberal	Tom Parry	19,609	56.8	+12.6
Unionist	Ernest Roberts	14,926	43.2	+3.6
Majority		4,683	13.6	+9.0
Turnout		34,535	69.4	−10.0
Liberal hold		Swing	+4.5	

General election 1924: Flintshire
Party	Candidate	Votes	%	±%
Unionist	Ernest Roberts	19,054	46.4	+3.2
Liberal	Tom Parry	14,169	34.5	−22.3
Labour	David Gwynfryn Jones	7,821	19.1	New
Majority		4,885	11.9	N/A
Turnout		41,044	80.2	+10.8
Unionist gain from Liberal		Swing	+12.7	

General election 1929: Flintshire
Party	Candidate	Votes	%	±%
Liberal	Frederick Llewellyn-Jones	24,012	43.0	+8.5
Unionist	Ernest Roberts	19,536	35.0	−11.4
Labour	Cyril O Jones	12,310	22.0	+2.9
Majority		4,476	8.0	N/A
Turnout		55,858	81.3	+1.1
Liberal gain from Unionist		Swing	+10.0	

=== Elections in the 1930s ===
General election 1931: Flintshire
Party	Candidate	Votes	%	±%
National Liberal (Conservative)	Frederick Llewellyn-Jones	40,405	71.4	+36.4
Labour	Frances Edwards	16,158	28.6	+6.6
Majority		24,247	42.8	+34.8
Turnout		56,563	77.9	−3.4
National Liberal hold		Swing		

General election 1935: Flintshire
Party	Candidate	Votes	%	±%
Conservative	Gwilym Rowlands	26,644	44.9	New
Liberal	John Emlyn-Jones	16,536	27.9	−26.5
Labour	Cyril O Jones	16,131	27.2	−1.6
Majority		10,108	17.0	N/A
Turnout		59,311	76.3	−1.6
Conservative gain from National Liberal		Swing		

=== Elections in the 1940s ===
General Election 1939–40: Another General Election was due to take place before the end of 1940. From 1939 the parties had been preparing for an election, and by the end of that year, the following candidates had been selected:

- Conservative: Gwilym Rowlands
- Liberal: Mostyn Lewis
- Labour: WJ Rees

General election 1945: Flintshire
Party	Candidate	Votes	%	±%
Conservative	Nigel Birch	27,800	38.8	−6.1
Labour	Eirene Jones	26,761	37.4	+10.2
Liberal	John Williams Hughes	17,007	23.8	−4.1
Majority		1,039	1.5	−15.5
Turnout		71,568	76.7	+0.4
Conservative hold		Swing		
