= Kenrick Eyton =

Welsh lawyer and politician

Sir Kenrick Eyton (c. 1607 – 21 November 1681) was a Welsh lawyer and politician who sat in the House of Commons in 1660. He fought in the Royalist army in the English Civil War.

Eyton was the son of Sir Gerard Eyton of Eyton, Denbighshire. He was called to the bar. He joined the Royalist army and was one of the commissioners to arrange the surrender of Denbigh Castle to General Thomas Mytton on 14 October 1646.

In 1660, Eyton was elected Member of Parliament for Flintshire in the Convention Parliament. He was appointed King's Attorney at Chester in August 1660 and Prothonotary and Clerk of the Crown for Denbighshire and Montgomeryshire in July 1661. In 1670 he was appointed Second Justice of the Court of Great Sessions in Wales for Anglesey, Caernarfon and Merioneth. He was knighted on 13 April 1675.

Eyton married Eleanor Mutton, daughter of Sir Peter Mutton of Llanerch.
