= Hanmer baronets =

Set index for Hanmer baronets

There have been two baronetcies created for members of the Hanmer family of Flintshire, Wales, one in the Baronetage of England and one in the Baronetage of Great Britain. As of 2026 one creation is extant.

- Hanmer baronets of Hanmer (1st creation, 1620)
- Hanmer baronets of Hanmer (2nd creation, 1774)
