= Cunliffe =

Cunliffe as an English surname derives from a former place near Rishton, Lancashire.

Notable people with the surname include:

- Baron Cunliffe, of Headley in the County of Surrey
- Barry Cunliffe (born 1939), Professor of European Archaeology at the University of Oxford
- Bill Cunliffe (born 1956), American jazz pianist and composer
- Billy Cunliffe (1897–1942), British rugby league footballer
- Charles Cunliffe (1858–1884), English cricketer
- Christopher Cunliffe (born 1955) British Anglican priest, Archdeacon of Derby
- Cunliffe baronets, of Liverpool in the County of Lancaster
- Cunliffe-Owen baronets, of Bray in the County of Berkshire
- Dan Cunliffe (1875–1937), English footballer
- Daniel Cunliffe (1801–1871), British artist
- David Cunliffe (born 1963), former New Zealand Labour Party Leader and Leader of the Opposition
- David Cunliffe-Lister, 2nd Earl of Swinton, JP, DL (1937–2006), British peer and politician
- Ernie Cunliffe (1937–2026), American middle-distance runner
- Sir Foster Cunliffe, 3rd Baronet (1755–1834), founder of the Royal Society of British Bowmen
- Foster Cunliffe (1875–1916), English cricketer
- Foster Cunliffe (rugby union) (1854–1927), English rugby union player
- Hannah Cunliffe (born 1996), American athlete
- Sir Hugo Cunliffe-Owen, 1st Baronet (1870–1947), English industrialist
- Jack Cunliffe (1921–1973), English rugby league footballer
- Jason Cunliffe (Hollyoaks), a character from the British soap opera Hollyoaks
- Jason Cunliffe (footballer) (born 1983), Guamanian footballer
- Jimmy Cunliffe (1912–1988), English footballer who played as an inside forward
- John Cunliffe (author) (1933–2018), British children's book author who created Postman Pat and Rosie and Jim
- John Cunliffe (footballer born 1930) (1930–1975), English footballer
- John Cunliffe (footballer born 1984), English football player
- Lawrence Cunliffe (1929–2025), British Labour Party politician
- Marcus Cunliffe (1922–1990), British historian and academic
- Mitzi Cunliffe (1918–2006), American sculptor
- Nicholas Cunliffe-Lister, 3rd Earl of Swinton (1939–2021), British peer
- Philip Cunliffe-Lister, 1st Earl of Swinton, GBE, CH, MC, PC (1884–1972), British Conservative politician
- R. Cunliffe Gosling DL (1868–1922), Victorian-era footballer
- Robert Cunliffe (disambiguation), several people
- Roger Cunliffe, 3rd Baron Cunliffe (born 1932), retired management consultant and former project manager
- Samuel Cunliffe Lister, 2nd Baron Masham (1857–1917), English baron and industrialist
- Sir William Cunliffe Brooks, 1st Baronet (1819–1900), son of Samuel Brooks
- Stella Cunliffe MBE (1917–2012), Director of Statistics at the British Home Office
- Susan Cunliffe-Lister, Countess of Swinton (1935–2023), crossbench member of the House of Lords
- Tom Cunliffe (born 1947), British yachting journalist, author and broadcaster
- Walter Cunliffe, 1st Baron Cunliffe, GBE (1855–1920), Governor of the Bank of England from 1913 to 1918
- Whit Cunliffe (1876–1966), English comic singer

== See also ==
- Cunliffe, Brooks, bank founded in Blackburn, Lancashire, England in 1792
- Cunliffe-Owen Aircraft, British aircraft manufacturer of the World War II era
