= David Cunliffe (disambiguation) =

David Cunliffe (born 1963) was leader of the New Zealand Labour Party from 2013 to 2014.

David Cunliffe may also refer to:

- David Cunliffe (producer and director) (1935–2022), British producer and director
- David Cunliffe-Lister, 2nd Earl of Swinton (1937–2006), English nobleman and politician
- Sir David Ellis Cunliffe, 9th Baronet (born 1957), English nobleman (Cunliffe baronets) and businessman

== See also ==
- Cunliffe (surname)
