= Robert Cunliffe =

Robert Cunliffe may refer to:

== Sports ==
- Robert Cunliffe (cricketer) (born 1973), English cricketer
- Bobby Cunliffe (footballer, born 1928) (1928–2000), winger for Manchester City, Chesterfield and Southport
- Bobby Cunliffe (footballer, born 1945), inside forward for Manchester City and York City
- Robert Cunliffe (rower) (born 1950), Canadian Olympic rower

== Politicians and baronets ==
- Robert Cunliffe (MP) (died 1653), English politician
- Sir Robert Cunliffe, 5th Baronet (1839–1905), English Liberal politician
- Sir Robert Cunliffe, 2nd Baronet (1719–1778), of the Cunliffe baronets
- Sir Robert Henry Cunliffe, 4th Baronet (1785–1859), of the Cunliffe baronets
- Sir Robert Neville Henry Cunliffe, 7th Baronet (1884–1949), of the Cunliffe baronets
- Robert Cunliffe (Royal Navy officer) (1895–1990), British commodore

== See also ==
- Cunliffe (surname)
