= 13th (Service) Battalion, Rifle Brigade =

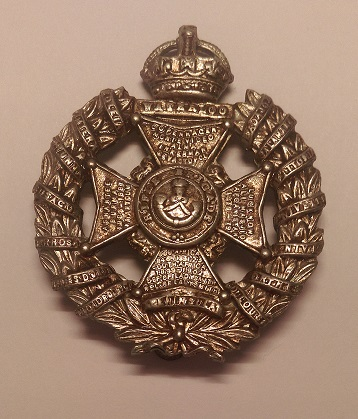
- Cap badge of the Rifle Brigade
- Active: 14 October 1914–15 May 1919
- Allegiance: United Kingdom
- Branch: New Army
- Role: Infantry
- Size: One Battalion
- Part of: 37th Division
- Engagements: Battle of the Somme; Battle of the Ancre; Battle of Arras; Third Battle of Ypres; German spring offensive Hundred Days Offensive

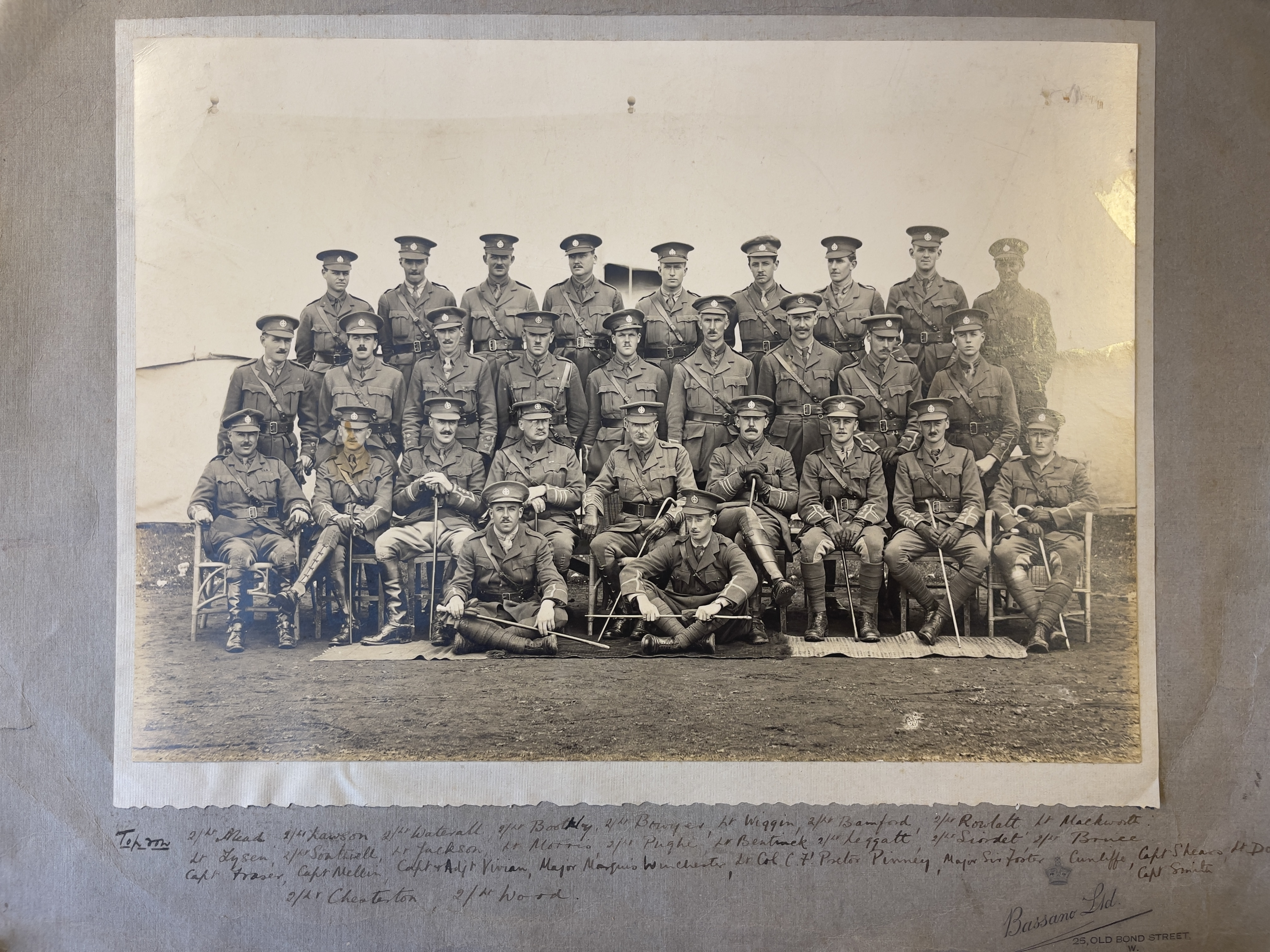
The Officers of 13th (Service) Battalion Rifle Brigade, probably early 1915 before deployment with names of officers written at the bottom of the mount.

The 13th (Service) Battalion, Rifle Brigade, (13th RB) was an infantry unit recruited as part of 'Kitchener's Army' in World War I. It served on the Western Front from July 1915 until the Armistice, seeing action at the Somme where it was half-destroyed in its first attack, and later at the Ancre, at Arras and Ypres, against the German spring offensive, and in the victorious Hundred Days Offensive. The battalion won two Victoria Crosses in a single action in May 1918. It was finally disbanded in May 1919.

== Recruitment and training ==
Alfred Leete's recruitment poster for Kitchener's Army.

On 6 August 1914, less than 48 hours after Britain's declaration of war, Parliament sanctioned an increase of 500,000 men for the Regular British Army. The newly appointed Secretary of State for War, Earl Kitchener of Khartoum, issued his famous call to arms: 'Your King and Country Need You', urging the first 100,000 volunteers to come forward. Men flooded into the recruiting offices and the 'first hundred thousand' were enlisted within days. This group of six divisions with supporting arms became known as Kitchener's First New Army, or 'K1'. K2 and K3 followed shortly afterwards.

13th (Service) Battalion was formed as part of K3 at the Rifle Brigade's regimental depot at Peninsula Barracks, Winchester, on 31 October 1914. It was designated as 'Army Troops', ie not assigned to a specific formation, but it was attached to 21st Division. The battalion's recruits were mainly Londoners and Welsh miners. After initial training at the crowded barracks at Winchester, the new battalion went by rail to 21st Division's tented camp at Halton Park, near Wendover in Buckinghamshire. Here it trained with dummy rifles under the command of Lt-Col Charles Pretor-Pinney, who had retired from the Rifle Brigade in 1898 but continued serving as a major with the 7th (King's Own Royal Tower Hamlets Militia) Battalion of the regiment, seeing service in the Second Boer War. In November the battalion moved out of tents into huts, and then on 28 November went into billets in nearby High Wycombe.

The battalion's training advanced at High Wycombe. At last, on 9 April 1915, it left for Salisbury Plain with orders to join the new 37th Division. As authorised in March, 37th Division consisted of Kitchener battalions that had originally been allocated as Army Troops to the New Armies. 13th Rifle Brigade was assigned to 111th Brigade in the new division; the brigade also included 10th (Stockbrokers) and 13th Battalions, Royal Fusiliers (RF), and 13th Bn, King's Royal Rifle Corps (KRRC). 13th RB went into a tented camp on Windmill Hill near Ludgershall, where it finally received its rifles and khaki uniforms in place of the temporary Navy blue it had been wearing. By the time the division assembled, all its units had been training for some months, and it soon began final battle training.

In July orders arrived for the division to move to France to join the British Expeditionary Force (BEF) on the Western Front. 13th RB embarked on the paddle steamer Mona's Queen at Southampton Docks on 29 July and landed at Le Havre next day. By 2 August the division had completed its concentration by rail around Tilques, near Saint-Omer. It then began marching towards the rear areas of the front, where 13th RB went into billets at Saint-Sylvestre-Cappel.

== Service ==
The battalions of 111th Bde began providing working parties and then in mid-August went up by companies to be attached to units of 12th (Eastern) Division near Armentières for their introduction to trench warfare. On 25 August they marched to Godewaersvelde and entrained for Doullens where the division took over a section of the Somme front from the French. The battalions of 111th Bde carried out their first spells in the trenches near Hannescamps, from the beginning of September, suffering a few casualties: 13th RB was relieved by 13th KRRC on 10 September after its first spell in the front line. When not in the front line the battalions provided working parties. On the evening of 24 September the brigade was moved a few miles north and next day waited in full fighting order in case it was called upon to join in the Battle of Loos that began that day. However, it was not employed, and a few days later it returned to its previous trenches. The battalions settled into a routine of six days in the line, six in reserve and 12 at rest (though often providing working parties). When in the from line, they occasionally mounted trench raids, and there was a trickle of casualties. This routine continued until the end of January 1916, the trenches often being flooded during the winter.

In February the brigade went back into the line, taking over from the French some trenches at Le Gastineau, a few miles north of the Gommecourt Salient. Duty here was six days in the front line and six out of it; 13th RB and 13th RF took turns to man the line in their sector, going into billets at Bienvillers when not in the line. It was a quiet sector, apart from occasional artillery bombardments and raids, though the uneven nature of the ground meant that snipers could find good vantage points on the higher ground. On 12 February 111th Bde took over more of the line from the French, 13th RB moving a few miles to Bailleulval, relieving the French 5th Dragoons opposite Avinger Wood. On 19 March 37th Division was withdrawn and marched back to the Doullens area to undergo a month's training, 13th RB going to Auxi-le-Château. Here it was attached to Third Army School of Instruction as a demonstration battalion until the end of April. It then returned to Bailleulval, where activity had increased, with more raids by bombing parties.

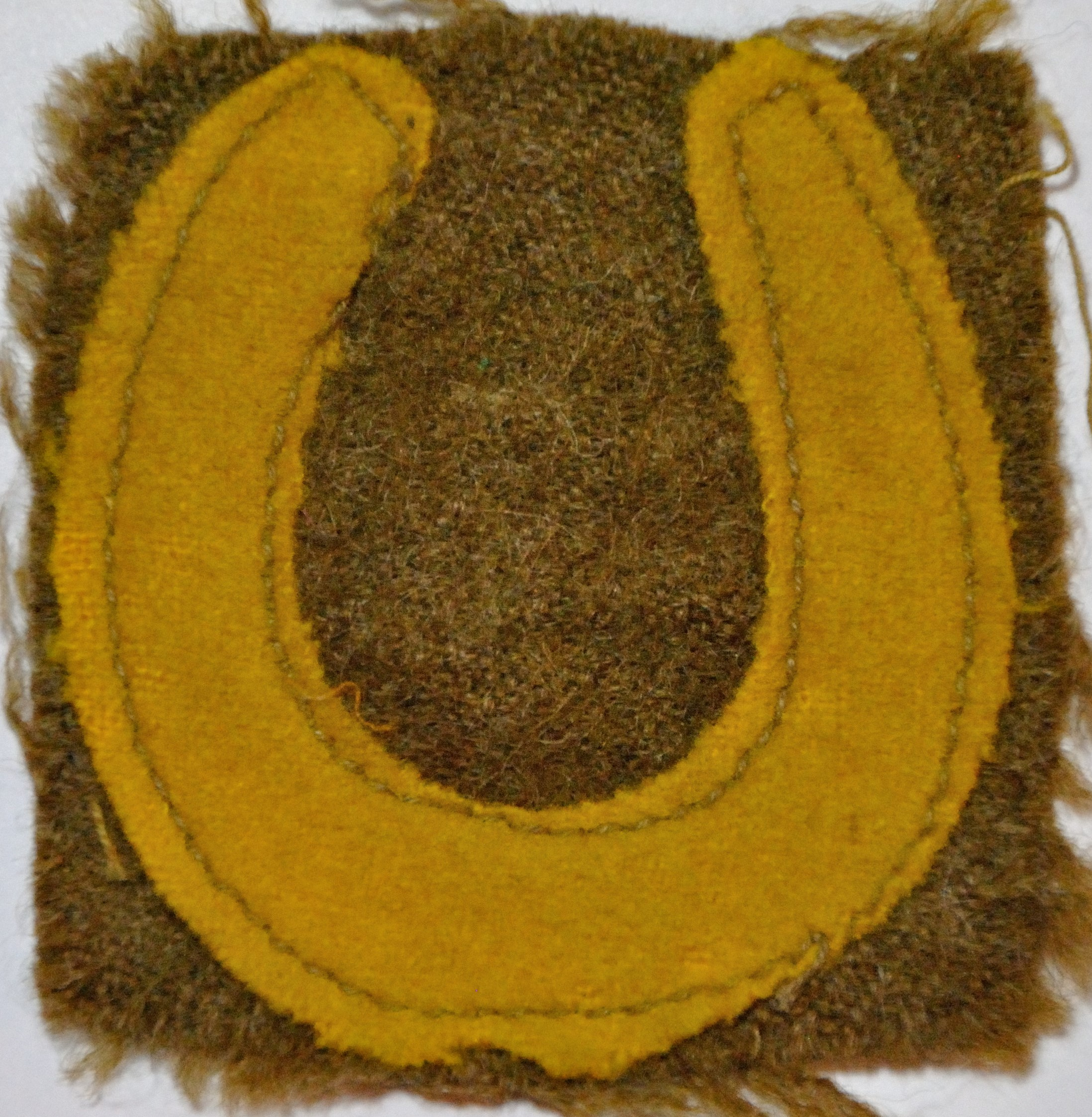
37th Division's 'golden horseshoe' insignia.

=== Somme ===
13th Rifle Brigade had been in France almost a year and had still not participated in any major action, but the BEF was now preparing for that summer's 'Big Push' (the Battle of the Somme). The artillery bombardment began on 23 June and 37th Division was moved to the Albert area, 13th RB going by bus. Here 111th Bde supplied working parties to carry forward gas cylinders for release when the assault was launched on 1 July. 37th Division was not involved initially. Then 111th Bde was attached to 34th Division from 7 July as a temporary replacement for a brigade that had been shattered on the First day on the Somme. The fresh troops were immediately rushed to the front to assist with carrying and working parties. 13th RB and 13th RF went up to the line first, on 6 July, attached to 56th Bde until 111th Bde HQ arrived to take over the line. The trenches were exposed and badly battered by shellfire and the battalions suffered a steady toll of casualties for two days. On 10 July 13th RB was in support for an attack on the Ovillers–Contalmaison line. At 20.15 the battalion received orders to attack towards Pozières in 30 minutes' time. Lieutenant-Col Pretor-Pinney deployed the battalion with D Company on the left of a tramway line with C Company in support, while A Company was on the right of the line with B Company in support. It went 'over the top' at 20.45 and advanced into a storm of shrapnel shells and machine gun bullets, much of the fire coming from the still-uncaptured Ovillers. With their lines rapidly thinning, the leading companies got into the third line of enemy trenches opposite, but as the CO followed with the two support companies he received a message that the attack had been cancelled. The units on either side had not advanced, leaving 13th RB exposed. Pretor-Pinney had to order his men to withdraw to their own trench through the curtain of enemy fire. Several days later, when the stragglers had come in and hospital reports collated, it emerged that the battalion had lost 20 officers and 380 other ranks (ORs), of whom 84 were dead. The CO and adjutant were wounded, the second-in-command was missing, three out of four company commanders were killed and the other wounded, the medical officer was dead and the Regimental Sergeant Major severely wounded; whole platoons had been wiped out. Although wounded, Lt-Col Pretor-Pinney remained with his men until the last of the survivors had come in. The battalion had been reduced to 4 officers and about 400 ORs. It was relieved in the front line next morning by two companies of 10th RF.

On 17 July Lt-Col Denys Prideaux-Brune, a Regular RB officer, arrived to take over command of 13th RB and begin the task of rebuilding the battalion. Two large drafts of reinforcements arrived, but the battalion was still much understrength when it went back into the trenches on 30 July. At first it was in the support line, later moving up to a position just south of Mametz Wood. Here it was heavily shelled on the night of 6 August, losing 21 killed and 23 wounded, mostly original members of the battalion. Two days later the battalion moved forward to a new support line south-east of Bazentin-le-Petit, with Battalion Headquarters (HQ) in a chalk-pit next to the cemetery, which also came under shellfire. On 18 August the battalion entrained for Calonne-sur-la-Lys, where 111th Bde returned to 37th Division on 22 August. Here it trained and held the line among the coal tips until the autumn. 13th RB usually alternated with 13th RF in the front trench, providing working parties when not in the line.

=== Ancre ===
On 17 October 37th Division marched back to the Somme, arriving at Puchevillers behind Albert on 22 October. Training here and at Hem-Hardinval was restricted by bad weather and the need to clear muddy roads. On 13 November 111th Bde moved up to the line between Varennes and Hédauville and came under the command of 63rd (Royal Naval) Division for the Battle of the Ancre. 13th RB was ordered forward and moved up through a heavy enemy barrage to reach the Green Line by midnight. Next morning 10th RF mopped up a German redoubt that 63rd (RN) Division had bypassed the day before, then at 06.15 13th RB and 13th RF pushed on behind a Creeping barrage towards Beaucourt and the objective of 'Muck Trench' (so named from its muddy condition). The barrage was inaccurate and the attack was held up for about an hour by machine gun fire, but with a renewed barrage 13th RB gained a footing in the enemy defences some 300 yards (270 m) north-east of 'Railway Alley', capturing numerous prisoners. Its left flank was now exposed and snipers were causing problems, but the bombers worked their way up Beaucourt Trench towards 'Leave Avenue'. The battalion finally consolidated the position, and then next morning D Company pushed on into Muck Trench. The battalion was relieved on 15 November and went back to bivouac at Englebelmer. Its losses were again very heavy, totalling 324, of which 93 were killed, and included nearly all of the battalion HQ runners and aid post staff. It was relieved by 10th RF that night, and 37th Division took over command of the sector. The rest of 111th Bde tried and failed to push forward into the 'Triangle' over the following days and was finally relieved on 19 November, returning to Puchevillers

Lieutenant-Col F.S.N. Savage-Armstrong, South Staffordshire Regiment, arrived from 2/7th Battalion, Essex Regiment, to take command of 13th RB. After two weeks' training at Puchevillers, where it absorbed some poorly trained reinforcements, 111th Bde marched northwards on 13 December, arriving in the trenches of the Neuve-Chapelle sector on 21 December. 13th RB was subjected to a devastating gas bombardment on 24 December. The battalions now began a routine of alternating trench duty, the recent reinforcements being trained at nearby Calonne-sur-la-Lys. The defences in this flooded sector consisted of breastworks rather than trenches, with a series of sentry posts connected by barbed wire. After two weeks in GHQ Reserve, the division shifted to the Hulluch sector in mid-February for another spell of trench duty. 13th RB came out of the line on 1 March and on 3 March Lt-Col Pretor-Pinney returned to take over the command having recovered from his wound. On 10 March 13th RB arrived at Mesnil-St Pol in the divisional training area west of Arras, where it trained in snowy weather for the forthcoming Battle of Arras.

=== Arras ===
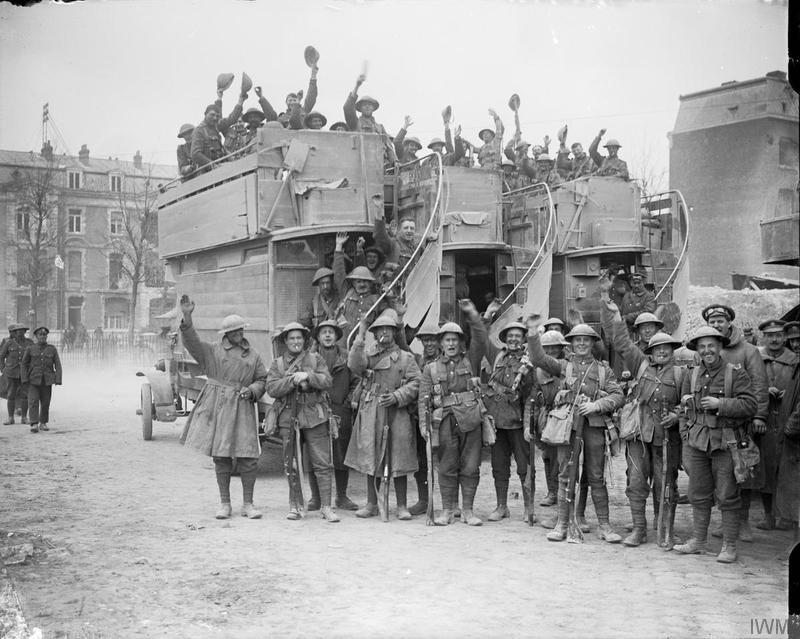
Men of 37th Division boarding London buses after coming out of the line following the capture of Monchy-le-Preux.

111th Brigade's (and Third Army's) objective for this attack was the village of Monchy-le-Preux on the high ground above the River Scarpe, and the operation was carefully rehearsed. The attack was to begin on 9 April after four days of bombardment, with the assaulting formations taking a succession of objectives, the Black, Blue and Brown lines. The fresh 37th Division waiting in the Arras suburbs would then pass through to capture the final (Green Line) objective, just beyond Monchy, but it was unclear whether this could be tackled on the first day. The assault went in at 05.30 and at 12.00 111th and 112th Bdes were ordered up to the Black Line. Then at 15.00 111th Bde followed 12th (Eastern) and 15th (Scottish) Divisions up Battery Valley, believing the Wancourt–Feuchy trenches (the Brown Line) to have already been captured. However, the brigade came under heavy machine gun fire from these trenches. It was not until 18.37 that 15th (S) Division reported the Brown Line secured, and 111th Bde attacked across fresh snow as darkness approached. 13th RB in reserve made its way to the Brown Line at 20.00, hurrying forward to assist 13th RF. By now the enemy had recovered from the initial shock of the assault, and the British field artillery was still moving up. 111th Brigade was held up by uncut barbed wire and its supporting tank broke down; the opportunity to seize Monchy on the first day was lost. During the night the troops of 111th and 112th Bdes were disentangled from those of 12th (E) Division, and at 04.00 on 10 April 13th RB was ordered to a point near Broken Hill, and then warned to take up a more advanced position, but this was cancelled because the attack by 10th and 13th RF had failed and they had to fall back and dig in about 500 yards (460 m) short of Monchy. An erroneous report that they were in Monchy led to the British cavalry being brought up to exploit a breakthrough, but they achieved nothing. 13th RB had lost about 80 men out of its frontline strength of 500, and overnight had to 'dig like moles', while C Company acted as ration carriers. The brigade tried again at 05.00 on 11 April, this time led by 13th RB (left) and 13th KRRC (right) with four tanks in support to suppress the machine guns. 13th RB advanced with two companies in two waves, the other two companies following in similar formation, while four Lewis guns were posted to protect the open left flank. Progress up the slope was slow and casualties heavy, but the two battalions finally made their way to Monchy, followed by 10th RF, who stormed into the village itself about 11.00. The Lewis gun teams pushed out beyond the village took a heavy toll of the retreating defenders. The official historian described the capture of Monchy-le-Preux as 'one of the outstanding feats of the whole battle'. Although the remnant of 111th Bde was now weak, with very few officers, it was assisted in consolidating the village (in a snowstorm) by 63rd Bde of 37th Division and the cavalry. As senior CO, Lt-Col Pretor-Pinney was in command of the four battalions in the village. During the whole operation, 9–12 April, 13th RB had 30 ORs killed and 134 wounded.

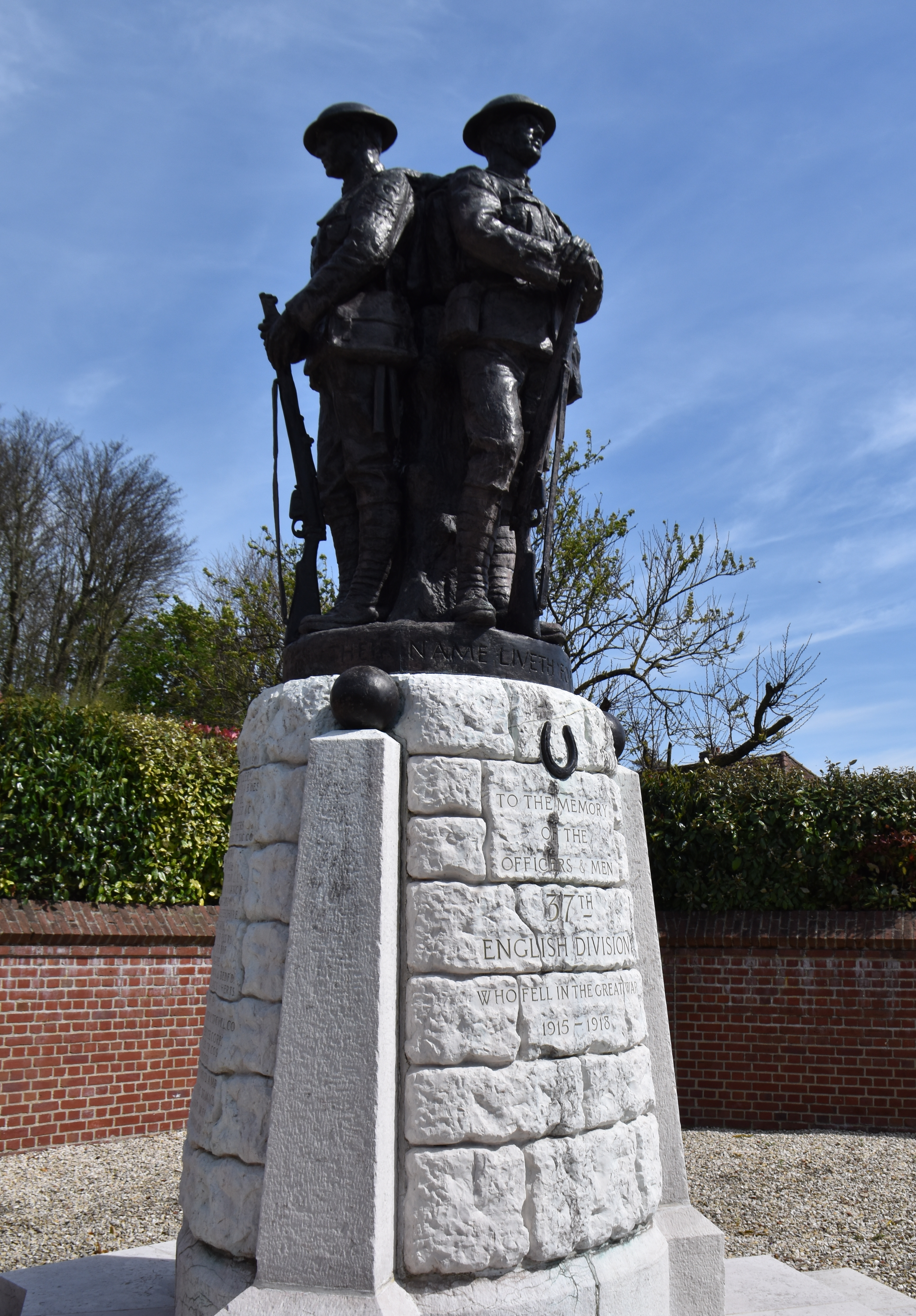
Monument to the 37th Division at Monchy-le-Preux.

111th Brigade returned to the front on 19 April in time for the Second Battle of the Scarpe, opening on 22 April. At Zero (04.45) the brigade attacked toward Gavrelle behind a Creeping barrage, with three battalions in line and 13th RB in reserve. While the brigade took its first and second objectives, 13th RB had to follow through a barrage of German heavy artillery, and the leading companies lost all their officers, coming to a halt in some partially-dug assembly trenches just in front of the first objective. The second wave arrived, and together they pushed through the enemy wire into the trenches, which they began to consolidate, having to mop up some Germans still in dugouts. Among the casualties was Lt-Col Pretor-Pinney, badly wounded. Captain the Hon R.W. Morgan-Grenville was ordered to take over command, but he too was wounded on his way back to battalion HQ. Temporary command devolved on Capt C.N.C. Boyle until Maj Arnold Strode Jackson could be recalled from liaison duties with 63rd Bde. At 09.00 Jackson found only four officers and 120 ORs of the battalion in the captured trenches opposite Gavrelle with several Lewis gun teams missing. An hour later he was ordered to go up to assist 13th KRRC in consolidating the final objective along the sunken Plouvain–Gavrelle road, but 13th KRRC's right flank was in the air and the two COs agreed to deploy two companies of 13th RB under Capt Boyle to cover that flank, with six Lewis guns in the line. This position was consolidated, and early on 24 April three of the missing Lewis gun teams turned up, having gone forward with 63rd Bde by mistake; these were posted in shellholes to link up with 13th KRRC's line. The enemy bombarded the position heavily, but 111th Bde consolidated it over the following days. On the evening of 27 April Maj Walter Stewart from 1st RB arrived to take command of 13th RB, the battalion's fifth CO in five days (although wounded, Maj Jackson remained with the battalion). At 04.25 next morning 111th Bde carried out the next assault, on the 'Whip Crossroads' south-east of Gavrelle, with 13th RB on the left and 13th RF on the right. By about 07.00 the objectives had been taken and when Maj Jackson went forward to investigate he found 13th Bn digging in on the objective, the only part of the Battle of Arleux (or Gavrelle) that went to plan. The battalion was relieved early in the morning of 30 April and went to St Nicholas, just north of Arras. On that day Lt-Col Pretor-Pinney was buried at Aubigny Communal Cemetery Extension, having died of his wound in No 30 Casualty Clearing Station. The battalion's casualties 20–30 April amounted to 4 officers and 28 ORs killed or died of wounds, 6 officers and 211 ORs wounded, and 19 ORs missing.

=== Ypres ===
Over the following weeks the battalion alternately trained and held the trenches in the Arras sector. On 30 May it was ordered to make a demonstration in conjunction with a neighbouring division. 13th RB sent out three attacking waves from C Company, but the first found the enemy fully prepared and without artillery support they had to withdraw. This 'minor operation' cost the battalion 54 killed and wounded. The battalion then went to Erny-Saint-Julien for training until 23 June when it began a march north to the Ypres Salient. 37th Division was now in Second Army for the forthcoming Third Battle of Ypres. It went into the line south of Wytschaete at the end of June, with 13th RB in the support trenches, which included day and night work under the supervision of the Royal Engineers (REs); one night a digging party was almost wiped out by shellfire. It spent the middle of July behind the lines training for the attack, then re-entered the line. The offensive began with the Battle of Pilckem Ridge on 31 July, in which Second Army played a minor role, advancing its line slightly, with 111th Bde supporting 63rd Bde. Later, 13th RB carried out a successful night raid, and on 6 August its patrols established observation posts in front of the line; the division was relieved that evening, then spent three more weeks training.

The battalion did further tours of duty in the reserve trenches and the front line in late August and September. 37th Division had no role in the attacks of 20 and 27 September, but was tasked with making a subsidiary attack in the Battle of Broodseinde planned for 4 October. It advanced about 200 yards (180 m) through the mud to protect the right flank of Second Army, which rested on the Ypres–Menin road. 13th RB was in brigade reserve, with one company attached to 13th RF in the attack, a second company also getting involved, the battalion suffering 1 officer and 9 ORs killed, 4 officers and 66 ORs wounded. The battalions were then employed in roadmaking until going into rest billets near Hazebrouck on 26 October.

=== Winter 1917–18 ===
Although it spent the rest of the year in and out of the line in the Salient, 13th RB was not engaged in any further attacks during the Ypres offensive. However, on the night of 9/10 January 1918 13th RB and 13th KRRC carried out two raids, for which a party of 4 officers and 70 ORs of 13th RB had been specially trained. 13th KRRC's raid at 12.30 did not provoke much retaliation, but 13th RB's, at 04.20, brought down a heavy retaliatory bombardment by German artillery and trench mortars. The storming party had run into a breastwork that the enemy was holding in strength, and a bombing fight ensued. The flanking party was unable to get round the block, and the raiders withdrew. On 11 January 13th RB was relieved and went to billets in La Sabloniere, where it remained training until the end of the month.

By early 1918 the BEF was suffering a manpower crisis, and infantry brigades were reduced from four to three battalions each, many of the surplus units being disbanded to provide reinforcements to the remainder. 111th Brigade lost 13th RF, transferred to 112th Bde to replace a disbanded battalion, and on 6 February 13th RB received a draft of 10 officers and 197 ORs from the disbanded 10th RB of 20th (Light) Division.

On 6 March 13th RB captured a prisoner who warned of an impending attack. It came at 06.30 on 8 March, when 13th KRRC was in the front line. The Germans shelled the battalion's trenches heavily, attacking and entering them about 14.00. The rest of 111th Bde counter-attacked, 13th RB as support battalion carrying up ammunition and boxes of bombs, and the position was restored by next morning.

=== Spring Offensive ===
The Germans launched their Spring Offensive against Third and Fifth Armies on 21 March, achieving a near-breakthrough. Although heavily shelled, Second Army was not attacked and quickly despatched reinforcements south to help stem the enemy advance. 37th Division was sent by rail on 28 March, arriving at Hébuterne next day and beginning to take over part of the line near Gommecourt on 31 March/1 April. 37th Division came under attack on 5 April, on the final day of the offensive (the Battle of the Ancre), but the enemy attack was forestalled by 63rd Bde's attempt to recover Rossignol Wood with tank and artillery support. There was some confusion on 111th Bde's front, but the German attackers were soon bombed back out of the British trenches. Lieutenant-Col Stewart was killed by a sniper on 8 April as he was going round the frontline trenches. He is buried in Couin New British Cemetery. Lt-Col H.S.C. Richardson took over on 12 April, and then left on 20 April to take command of 2nd RB while Lt-Col R.A. Mostyn-Owen arrived from that battalion to assume command of 13th RB.

=== Bucquoy ===
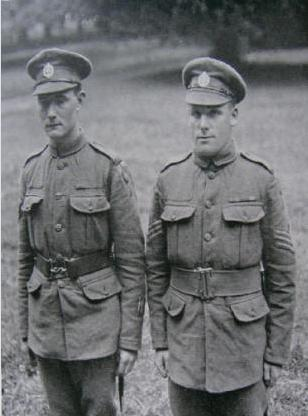
Victoria Cross recipients Rfn William Beesley (left) and Sjt William Gregg (right).

Although the first German offensive had ended in this sector, intermittent shelling, raiding, and bombing by aircraft continued throughout April and May. 13th RB took up positions at Bucquoy on 24 April. The line occupied after the fighting had died down was poor for observation, and headquarters decided to carry out a minor operation to improve matters. 13th RB was selected for this and a detailed plan was drawn up. A (right) and D (left) Companies would lead, followed by C and B in support. A Company was divided into four parties with the objectives of the cemetery and the roadside crucifix; D Company in five parties would prolong the line to the north. The companies moved into their assembly areas at midnight on 7/8 May, then waited until Zero at 14.00. There was no preliminary bombardment, but in emergency the companies could call down a protective barrage. The assault was launched punctually, but the cemetery proved tougher than expected and casualties were heavy as the company fought to eliminate the German riflemen and machine gunners hidden among the gravestones. The two leading parties having lost their officers, Serjeant William Gregg led them forward to the crucifix, until a German counter-attack from the support trenches drove them back to the edge of the cemetery. Reinforced by their own support company, Gregg and his parties then bombed their way back to the crucifix. Meanwhile, the adjacent platoon on the left had lost its serjeant and all its section leaders, but Rifleman William Beesley took command and continued the advance. First he engaged an enemy machine gun post with a Lewis gun and knocked it out, then began tackling the enemy posts in front, one of which he rushed single-handed, killing two German officers and capturing three others and their valuable map. After that he occupied the knocked out machine gun post and there mounted his Lewis gun, which his No 2 had brought up. There they remained, although the No 2 was wounded, until about 22.00 when they made their way back to their own lines. The right hand parties of D Company had also had a stiff fight, but the left hand parties had made their way without casualties to within 20 yards (18 m) of the enemy line, where they found excellent observation positions and began digging in and firing into the Germans massing in the valley beyond. Lieutenant-Col Mostyn-Owen had been given the discretion to call off the attack if it did not result in a better line, so at 17.40 Sjt Gregg's party was recalled with the rest of C Company, and D Company's posts to the north had to be successively abandoned after 18.00 when the planned artillery barrage failed. The number of casualties is disputed, but may have come to 49 killed and 100 in total. Serjeant Gregg and Rfn Beesley were both awarded the Victoria Cross for their conspicuous bravery.

The battalions spent most of June refitting and training while in Corps Reserve in the Purple Line, or supporting French troops. In August they returned to the line in front of Bucquoy and Ablainzevelle, bivouacking at Souastre when not in the front line. One night at Souastre 13th RB's cooks were wiped out by a single bomb dropped into their camp by a German aircraft.

=== Hundred Days Offensive ===
The Allies launched their rolling Hundred Days Offensive on 8 August. On the night of 20/21 August 13th RB moved up from the support line to take part in 37th Division's dawn attack on Ablainzevelle next day. At 04.55 the creeping barrage began, and 111th Bde with 13th RB on the left and 10th RF on the right advanced through dense mist, which caused the supporting tanks to get lost and prevented the use of air support. Nevertheless, the infantry encountered few difficulties in achieving their objrctives. For 13th RB these were to cross the enemy trenches in front then swing round to the north of the village and establish a line 1,700–2,000 yards (1,600–1,800 m) in front. D (right) and B (left) Companies led, with A in support and C in reserve; the message that they were consolidating on their objectives was received at 07.20. Two days later 37th Division attacked again at Achiet-le-Grand and Bihucourt. 111th Bde advanced at 11.00 with 13th RB and 13th KRRC in line behind the creeping barrage, supported by tanks, the two battalion COs carrying flags. The first objective was won by 11.30 after a fierce fight where the enemy were massed in the railway cutting, thanks to the speed of the advance. By 13.00 the battalion had consolidated a line 1,000 yards (910 m) beyond and was pushing on towards Bihucourt, which was taken by 10th RF passing through at 13.20 behind a fresh barrage. By 14.15 13th RB was consolidated east of the village, having taken some 500 prisoners, 40 heavy and 70 light machine guns, 20 trench mortars, 10 anti-tank guns, one 4.2-inch howitzer and one 77-mm field gun. The German line now formed an acute salient, and at 04.00 on 24 August 13th RB was ordered to straighten this out by moving forward and occupying the high ground north-east of Bihucourt. By 07.00 next morning this had been completed and the battalion was ordered to exploit this success by sending out strong patrols towards Favreuil and getting in touch with the New Zealand Division which was attacking that village. By the evening the NewZealanders had still not captured Favreuil, so 111th Bde was ordered to assist them. Zero was set for 18.30 and the whole brigade was to attack, with 13th RB on the right. Just as the battalions were moving into their assembly area under cover of some banks around 800 yards (730 m) west of Favreuil, the Germans put down a barrage in front of the village and on the valley up which they were to advance; it was suspected that the divisional telegraph message ordering the attack had been intercepted. Nonetheless, the attack started punctually. Simultaneously, a large German force emerged from the village to counter-attack: the two forces met half-way and after a close-quarters fight the Germans gave up, some 400 surrendering. Although 13th KRRC was held up short of the village,13th RB quickly entered the southern end and pushed through, taking prisoners and machine guns until it reached its objective, a trench 150 yards (140 m) east of the village. 13th KRRC and 10th RF formed a defensive flank, and after dark patrols from all three battalions cleared the northern half of the village. 13th RB was relieved on the morning of 26 August and went back to huts in Logeast Wood where it remained until 3 September. During the fighting of 21–25 August, the battalion had lost 4 officers and 46 ORs killed, 7 officers and 252 ORs wounded.

Following a period of training, 37th Division moved up to Havrincourt Wood for its next attack (the Battle of Havrincourt). After a day of reconnaissance, 111th Brigade led the division's assault on the Trescault Spur on 12 September. During the night the brigade had managed to establish outposts at the edge of the wood, despite enemy gas shelling, and jumped off from this line at 05.25, 13th RB on the right, 13th KRRC on the left, with 10th RF in support. 13th RB advanced with B and D Companies in front, C in support and A in reserve. One platoon of A Company had been pushed 800 yards (730 m) forwards during the night, so that it could cover D Company's left at Zero. This was very successful, but at first the advance was delayed by enemy machine guns. These were dealt with, and by 07.00 it was reported that the leading companies had reached their first objective and that C Company was consolidating two strongpoints 1,000 yards (910 m) beyond. 13th KRRC had been held up by the village of Trescault beneath the spur and a strongpoint east of it which were obstinately defended, but these were suppressed by crossfire from 13th RB. By 09.00 13th RB had also taken the third objective, 2,700 yards (2,500 m) from the start line. The rest of the day was quiet, until the expected German counter-attack came at 18.00, preceded by a heavy bombardment. About 50 Germans advanced up 'Queen's Lane' and forced their way into 'Shaftesbury Avenue' about 1,300 yards (1,200 m) east of the village. They succeeded in destroying the 13th RB/13th KRRC liaison post at the junction of those trenches, but 13th KRRC counter-attacked and drove the intruders back towards 13th RB, and most of them were captured or killed in the crossfire or by the SOS barrage called down from the artillery. A strong new liaison post was then established. The following morning D Company, which had suffered most heavily, was relieved. The enemy kept up a persistent bombardment, and in the evening repeated the counter-attack of the previous day. B Company on the right dealt with it by rifle and Lewis gun fire' some 15 Germans got into C Company's trench but were thrown out and shot down when they became entangled in the wire. Although 111th Bde was engaged in a further attack on 14 September, 13th RB was not involved and was relieved that evening. Its casualties 11–14 September amounted to 2 officers and 26 ORs killed, 2 officers and 98 ORs wounded, 12 ORs missing.

The Allies carried out a series of coordinated attacks along the Western Front on 26–29 September, including an assault crossing of part of the Canal du Nord. On 30 September 111th Bde found that the German bridgehead at Banteux had been abandoned, and closed up to form an outpost line along the bank of the Escaut Canal. 13th RB cautiously pushed patrols across the canal, but on 5 October the enemy retreated and 13th RB was able to send two platoons across unhindered, followed by the rest of the battalion crossing by closing the lock gates and using them as a bridge; 13th KRRC alongside had to make do with a single plank. The two battalions advanced until they met opposition along the Beaurevoir Line. 37th Division assaulted this line as part of the Battle of Cambrai on 8 October. 13th RB's role was to escort the tanks of 12th Battalion, Tank Corps, while C Company was held ready to support 10th RF's attack, though it was not engaged. Many prisoners were taken, the escort of one tank rounding up 80 alone. 37th Division's advance now became a pursuit of the beaten enemy to the River Selle, but 111th Bde was withdrawn for rest, with 13th RB spending 10 days at Ligny-en-Cambrésis among liberated French civilians.

The brigade was back in the line on 23 October for the second day of the BEF's next set-piece attack, the Battle of the Selle. After 5th Division had taken the first three objectives, including the village of Beaurain, 37th Division was to assemble 111th Bde behind a smoke barrage and then send it through at 08.00. 13th RB was in position along the railway east of Briastre, and moved behind 5th Division by 06.00. The Germans defended Beaurain tenaciously, and 111th Bde's advance was postponed. When it did go ahead at 10.15, after a 15-minute barrage, 13th RB and 13th KRRC led off. As the barrage crept forward, C (right) and A (left) Companies of 13th RB followed it closely, with B and D Companies 400 yards (370 m) behind in support. The brigade faced a fierce fight, but secured its objective by 14.30, taking scores of prisoners. 13th RB and 13th KRRC had been ordered to 'exploit' Neuville in front and by 15.30 patrols reported the line of the River St George clear. The rest of the brigade passed through at 17.15 and attempted to continue the advance, though it achieved little more that day. 13th RB then spent 10 days in 'very bad' billets at Beaurain. Its casualties during October had been 8 officers and 107 ORs.

The brigade was brought forward on the night of 3/4 November and assembled on the outskirts of Ghissignies for the next operation, part of the Battle of the Sambre. The barrage began at 05.30 and 13th RB and 13th KRRC launched the assault four minutes later. D Company 13th RB closely supported by two platoons of A Company quickly reached the railway line 300 yards (270 m) in front and took it after fierce fighting, taking 12 machine guns and 50 prisoners. Pushing forward it overcame all opposition and passed Louvignies-Quesnoy to reach the Blue Line objective on time at 07.30, machine gun and trench mortar posts being efficiently mopped up by small groups or individual riflemen. The right of C Company was temporarily held up, but the two left platoons and one of A Company pushed forward and joined D Company on the Blue Line, taking another 30–40 prisoners with machine guns and mortars. B Company, in reserve in the cellars of Ghissignies, moved off at 06.00 to the railway. Here it was held up by machine gun fire from a chapel near the road crossing. The company commander organised an attack by two platoons astride the railway supported by a tank and a trench mortar section. This culminated in close quarters fighting with heavy casualties to both sides, but by 07.15 the company had cleared up the situation, capturing several machine guns and 70 prisoners. At 08.00 B Company with the remainder of A and C moved on to the final (Blue Dotted Line) objective under heavy shellfire. Heavy mist ruled out visual communication throughout the fight, and the runners suffered numerous casualties trying to get through the barrages that the Germans laid behind the attacking battalions. The German infantry, however, were now broken: by 10.30 the line was consolidated and prisoners were giving themselves up freely as 112th Bde passed through to continue the pursuit. It was 13th RB's last battle, having cost 4 officers and 27 ORs killed or died of wounds, 4 officers and 90 ORs wounded, and 14 missing.

Early on 5 November 5th Division passed through and took over from the 37th, which concentrated with 111th Bde staying in its 'bad' billets at Beaurain. On 11 November the division moved to Caudry, and during the march the men were told that the Armistice with Germany had come into force at 11.00, bringing hostilities to an end.

== Post-Armistice ==
The units of 37th Division were now employed in training, education and recreation. On 1 December they began a long move to an area north of Charleroi, but from 2 to 14 December were held up by bad weather and billeted north of Le Quesnoy until the march could resume. On 20 December the battalion settled into its final billets at Jumet near Charleroi. Demobilisation began in December.

On 15 February 1919 37th Division began to disband, and it ceased to exist on 24/25 March. 13th (Service) Battalion, Rifle Brigade, was reduced to a cadre in France and then returned to the UK under Lt-Col Mostyn-Owen on 5 May. It was disbanded on 15 May 1919 at Barrow-in-Furness. Its total casualties during its service on the Western Front were 37 officers and 731 ORs killed or died of wounds, 2148 ORs evacuated to the UK wounded or sick. A number of wounded also died after the Armistice.

== Commanders ==
The following officers commanded the battalion:

- Lt-Col Charles Frederick Pretor-Pinney, DSO, from formation, wounded at Pozières 10 July 1916, returned 3 March 1917, died of wounds 28 April 1917
- Lt-Col Denys Prideaux-Brune, DSO, 17 July–November 1916
- Lt-Col F.S.N. Savage-Armstrong, South Staffordshire Regiment, November 1916–March 1917
- Lt-Col Walter Robert Stewart, DSO, MC, from 27 April 1917, killed in action 8 April 1918
- Lt-Col H.S.C. Richardson, 12–20 April 1918
- Lt-Col R.A. Mostyn-Owen, DSO, from 20 April 1918 to disbandment

Other officers who served with the battalion included:

- Arnold Strode Jackson, Olympic gold medallist, commissioned as 2/Lt 1914, rose to major and acting CO; later CO of 13th KRRC, ended war as Brig-Gen
- Major the Marquess of Winchester
- Major Sir Foster Cunliffe, 6th Baronet, lecturer in military history at Oxford University, killed in action at Pozières 10 July 1916
- Capt Geoffrey Smith, lecturer in zoology and comparative anatomy at Oxford, killed in action at Pozières 10 July 1916
- Capt Colin Gilray, rugby international and teacher, wounded at the Ancre 13 November 1916

== Insignia ==
37th Division's formation sign was originally a gold horseshoe pointing downwards; in November 1916 this was changed to point upwards. In 1916 the Division adopted a system of 'battle patches' on the upper arm to identify individual units and subunits. These were based on brigade colours (111th Bde wore blue), geometric shapes for battalions, and horizontal stripes to indicate companies. For 13th RB the shape was a blue equilateral triangle worn beneath the divisional badge. Initially the battalion wore coloured company stripes on the shoulder strap beneath a blackened metal 'RB" title. These stripes were red for A Company, dark blue for B, purple for C and green for D. Later in the war they were moved to the shoulder above the divisional sign.

== Memorials ==
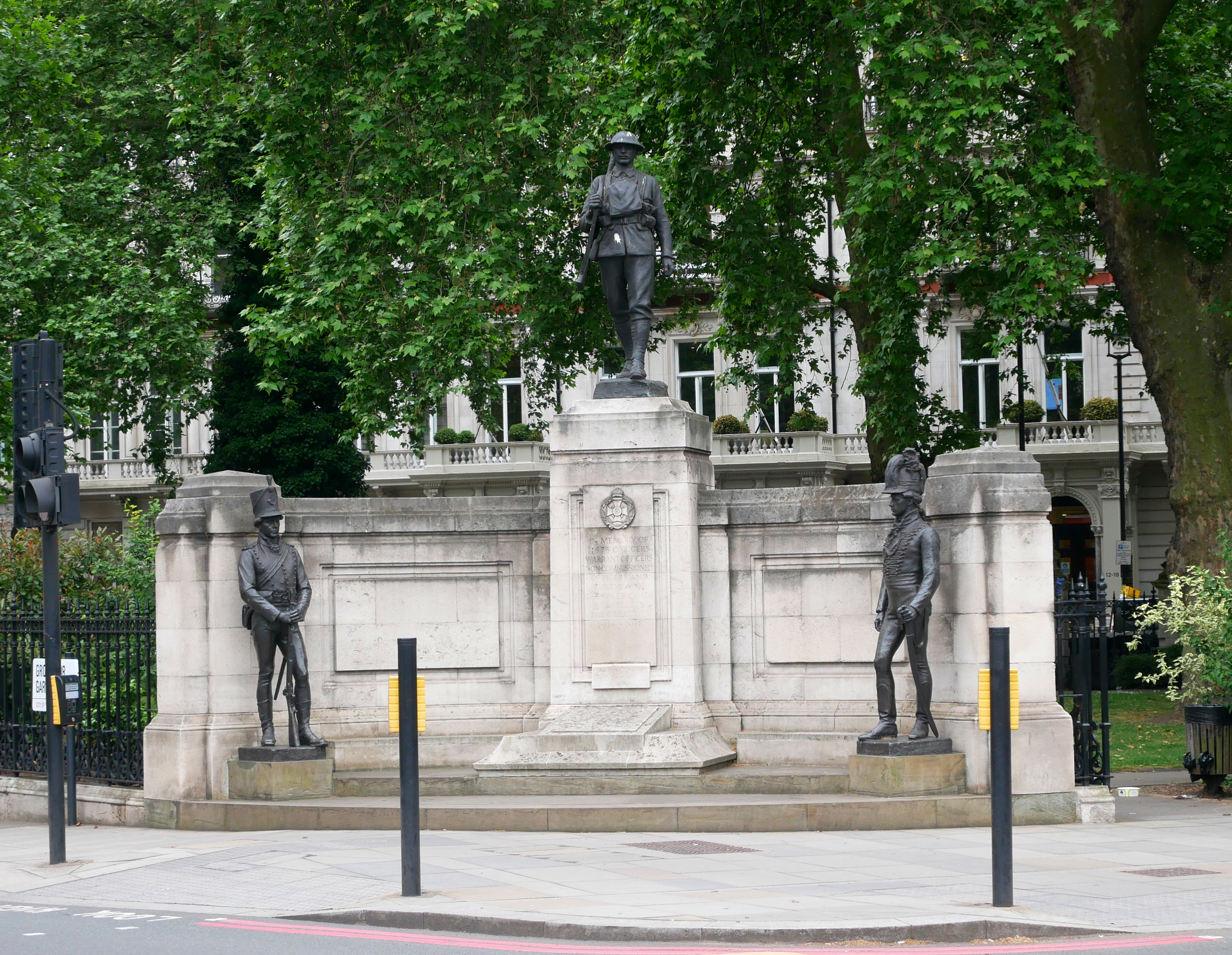
The Rifle Brigade Memorial, Grosvenor Gardens

37th Division's memorial is at Monchy-le-Preux, scene of its greatest success. It was sculpted by Lady Feodora Gleichen, sister of the divisional commander, Maj-Gen Lord Edward Gleichen.

The Rifle Brigade War Memorial stands at the corner of Grosvenor Gardens, in Westminster, with sculpture by John Tweed.

Lieutenant-Col Charles Pretor-Pinney, DSO, is commemorated in a window at the Church of St Michael and All Angels, Somerton, Somerset.

Major Sir Foster Cunliffe, 6th Baronet is commemorated by a prayer book in the chapel at All Souls College, Oxford.
