= Charles Menzies (Royal Marines officer) =

Royal Marines officer (1783–1866)

General Sir Charles Menzies KCB KH
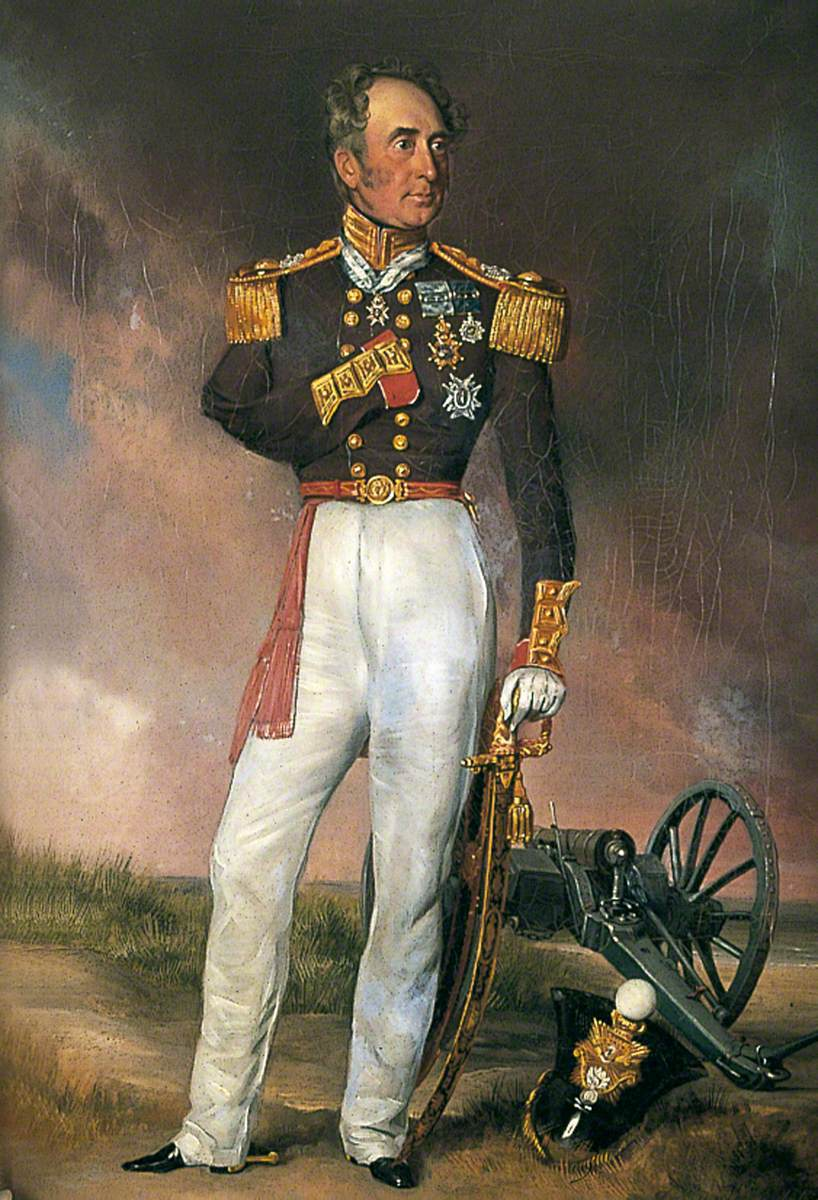
- Portrait by Daniel Cunliffe
- Born: 12 May 1783; Bal Freike, Perthshire, Scotland
- Died: 22 August 1866 (aged 83); Hastings, England
- Military career
- Allegiance: Great Britain; United Kingdom
- Branch: Royal Marines
- Service years: 1798–c.1857
- Rank: General
- Conflicts: Napoleonic Wars
- Awards: Knight Commander of the Order of the Bath; Knight of the Royal Guelphic Order

General Sir Charles Menzies, KCB, KH (12 May 1783 – 22 August 1866) was a Royal Marines officer. Although he became a respected soldier, fighting with Horatio Nelson in the Napoleonic Wars and later rising to the rank of general before becoming aide de camp to Queen Victoria, Menzies is best remembered for the founding of Newcastle, New South Wales and the successful commencement of its settlement between the age of 21 and 22.

== Early life ==
Menzies was born at Bolfracks House, near Aberfeldy, Perthshire, Scotland, in 1783, the son of Captain Charles Menzies of the 71st Regiment, and mother Sarah Menzies, née Walker. He was educated at Stirling and his family, who lived in their ancestral castle, purchased him a commission at the age of 15, as a second lieutenant in the Royal Marines on 17 February 1798.

Following his commission he saw plenty of action having been posted to duties that involved blockading French ports and chasing the French and Spanish fleets in the Mediterranean sea. He was attached to Vice Admiral Horatio Nelson's squadron off Boulogne, on France's Atlantic coast and was repeatedly involved in attacking shore batteries and engaged in skirmishes with French boats.

== Arrival in Australia ==
In December 1803 Menzies sailed to Australia on board HMS Calcutta, which was transporting some convicts to New South Wales and then others to form a new settlement in Tasmania (then known as Van Diemen's land).

Menzies was aboard the ship in Port Jackson, Sydney on 5 March 1804 when a rebellion involving a number of convicts broke out in the area of Castle Hill. This incident would later be called the Castle Hill Rebellion and the Second Battle of Vinegar Hill. Menzies with a detachment of 150 marines landed from the ship to help quell the rebellion. He was promoted to lieutenant shortly thereafter.

Governor Phillip Gidley King, faced with a need to prevent future outbreaks of this nature, hanged the nine leaders of the 300 rebels involved and ordered the establishment of a new settlement to segregate the Worst of the Irish sent here for Sedition from the other convicts. This was after King in 1800 decided for the same reason to establish the prison town at Castle Hill so as to isolate the "political" exiles away from the main settlements at Farm Cove, Rose Hill (Parramatta) and Green Hills (Windsor). On 14 March 1804, nine days after the rebellion Menzies wrote to the Governor offering his services as the settlement's commandant.

== Establishment of Newcastle ==
Governor King accepted this offer and provided Menzies with a Commission dated 15 March 1804, which appointed him as the commander of the settlement of Newcastle. The Commission signed by the Governor noted:

Whereas it is expedient, in consequence of an instruction from His Majesty's Principal Secretary of State for the Colonies and War Department, as well as from existing causes, that the settlement at the Coal Harbour and Hunter River, now distinguished by the name of Newcastle, in the county of Northumberland, should be re-established without loss of time...: You are, therefore, hereby required and directed to take upon you the charge and command of the said settlement; and I do hereby charge and command all His Majesty's subjects that may be within our command to obey your directions, and you to obey all such Orders and directions as you may from time to time receive from me, or any other your superior officer (sic), according to the rules and discipline of war. For which this shall be your authority.

Menzies resigned his commission in relation to his detachment of Royal Marines and formed an expedition of skilled personnel including the surgeon James Mileham, Isaac Knight whose role was to be superintendent of the convicts, John Tucker a store-keeper, the botanist George Caley, Ferdinand Bauer an artist, and eleven military guards. Thirty-four especially chosen convicts, including three miners, three timber cutters, two carpenters, a gardener and a salt bailer (with the skill of making salt from salt water) and which also fitted Governor King's description of "the worst of the Irish" left Sydney on 28 March in three small ships the Lady Nelson, Francis and Resource.

The party arrived on 30 March by accounts at noon and Menzies' flotilla anchored of the entrance to Coal River. A boat from Menzies ship and seamen aboard the boat rowed him towards the southern shore of the river.

Menzies initially called the settlement Kingstown (after the Governor and as a continuation of the name used for a temporary settlement in 1800)—but this reverted to Newcastle, which was the Governor's personal choice.

== Menzies' year in Newcastle ==
Other than the general Commission provided by the Governor, Menzies was instructed to use the convicts to get "as many coals as possible", cutting cedar, clearing ground for cultivation and "to enforce a due observance of religion and good order".

Although only aged 21 when he arrived at Newcastle, Menzies proved to be both stern and forward thinking. This was shown by his rules which dictated that convicts would work from sunrise to sunset but have a rest of two hours in the middle of the day. To reduce the possibility of the convicts' escape, food rations were only issued twice a week to stop the convicts from hoarding food for any escape attempt.

Menzies befriended the local Awabakal and Worimi peoples, so that they would not assist any escapees.

Then later when he discovered a plot by the convicts to assassinate him and the other expedition members he arrested and severely punished the ringleaders.

Huts were constructed under his direction for both the expedition members and the convicts. He organised the building of a large stone wharf and established a coal beacon to assist other ships in their navigation into the harbour. Governor King said of Menzies in the year that he was commandant that he "fixed that Settlement and brought it to a forward degree of perfection".

=== After Newcastle ===
After a year establishing Newcastle, Menzies submitted his resignation to Governor King so that he could "return to England" and his "duty in the Royal Marines". King accepted his resignation and he left soon after, returning almost immediately to active service including a meritorious role in the war against Napoleon.

Menzies was promoted to the rank of captain in the Royal Marine Artillery in April 1813. He commanded the Royal Marine Artillery from 1838 to 1844, progressing through the ranks from major to lieutenant colonel and then in 1857 to general. He was appointed aide-de-camp to the Queen Victoria in 1852.

=== Marriage and children ===
Shortly after arriving in Sydney, Menzies had begun a brief liaison with a convict woman called Mindred/Mildred Rose Harrison. Their son, Charles Harrison Menzie, was born on 28 February 1805 in Sydney. Mildred was not among the people listed as going to New Castle with him. Young Charles Harrison Menzie was baptized on 23 June 1805 the day before his father left for England on the "Investigator". Charles Menzies would never see his eldest son again.

Menzies met Maria Wilhelmina, daughter of Dr Robert Bryant, physician to the Duke of Gloucester. They married on 16 December 1817 at Marylebone, Middlesex, England and had five children.

Menzies was made a Knight Commander of the Order of the Bath in April 1865 and died at Hastings on 22 August 1866.
