= Flint County =

Flint County may refer to:

- A fictional location in the game Grand Theft Auto: San Andreas
- The County of Flint, an historic county of Wales
- Flint Boroughs a former UK Parliament constituency
- Genesee County, Michigan, a county which has the city of Flint, Michigan as its county seat and biggest city in it, sometimes called "Flint County".
