= 1878 Flint Boroughs by-election =

UK Parliamentary by-election

The 1878 Flint Boroughs by-election was fought on 5 July 1878. The by-election was fought due to the death of the incumbent Liberal MP, Peter Ellis Eyton. It was won by the Liberal candidate John Roberts.

1878 Flint Boroughs by-election
Party	Candidate	Votes	%	±%
Liberal	John Roberts	1,636	52.0	−11.2
Conservative	Philip Pennant Pennant	1,511	48.0	+11.3
Majority		125	4.0	+3.9
Turnout		3,147	84.9	+4.4
Registered electors		3,707		
Liberal hold		Swing	-11.2	
