= Roger Brereton =

Welsh politician

Roger Brereton was a Welsh politician who sat in the House of Commons from 1604 to 1611.

Brereton was the third son of Owen Brereton of Borras near Gresford, Denbighshire.

He sat on the bench as justice of the peace for Flintshire from 1582 to 1617 and for Shropshire from 1598 to at least 1604. He was appointed High Sheriff of Flintshire for 1591–92.

In 1604, he was elected member of parliament for Flint.

Brereton possibly married Katherine Fulleshurst, widow of Edward Fulleshurst and daughter of Sir William Brereton of Brereton, Lord Chief Justice of Ireland by his second wife.

Parliament of England
Preceded by John Price	Member of Parliament for Flint; 1604	Succeeded by John Eyton
