= James Woolley Summers =

British politician

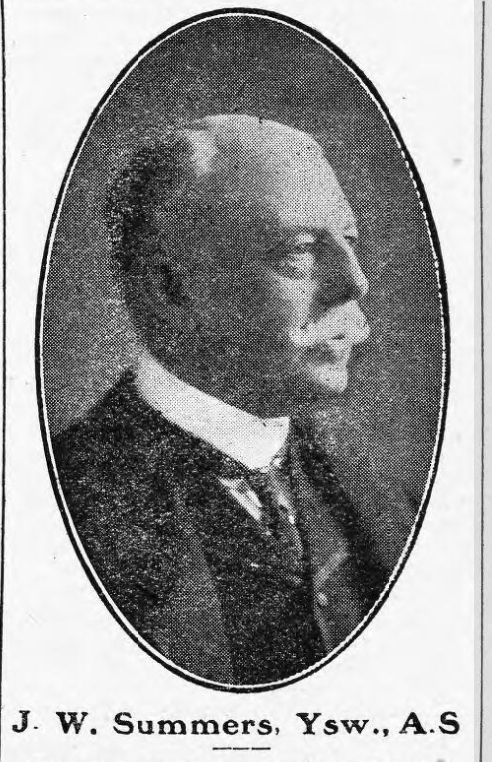
J W Summers MP (1910)

James Woolley Summers (24 March 1849 – 1 January 1913) was a British Liberal Party politician.

== Background ==
He was born in Dukinfield, Lancashire on 24 March 1849, the son of John Summers of Sunnyside, Ashton-under-Lyne. He married in 1883, Edith Mason, daughter of Hugh Mason, Member of Parliament for Ashton-under-Lyne. They had one son and one daughter, Lilias.

He died in London on 1 January 1913.

== Career ==
He was an Iron Master and Chairman of John Summers and Co., Ltd. He was a member of the Stalybridge Town Council and School Board. He was a member of the Flintshire County Council and was its chairman from 1904 to 1910. He was member of parliament for the Liberal seat of Flint Boroughs from 1910 until his death. He was first elected at the general election of January 1910, holding the seat for the Liberals. He held the seat at the following general election;

General election December 1910 Electorate 4,060
Party	Candidate	Votes	%	±%
Liberal	James Woolley Summers	2,098	56.9	+1.4
Conservative	Henry Richard Lloyd Howard	1,589	43.1	−1.4
Majority		509	13.8	+2.8
Turnout			90.8	−4.6
Liberal hold		Swing	+1.4	

He was in favour of the Disestablishment of the Church in Wales. He was in favour of Self-Government for Ireland in purely Irish affairs subject to the supreme authority of the Imperial Parliament. He served as a Justice of the Peace in Lancashire, Denbighshire and Flintshire.

== Sources ==
- British parliamentary election results 1885–1918, Craig, F. W. S.

Parliament of the United Kingdom
Preceded by Howell Idris	Member of Parliament for Flint Boroughs; January 1910–1913	Succeeded by Tom Parry
