= John Eyton =

Welsh politician

John Eyton (c. 1591 – March 1661) was a Welsh politician who sat in the House of Commons in 1614.

Eyton was the eldest son of John Eyton of Leeswood, Mold, Flintshire. He possibly matriculated from Hart Hall, Oxford on 12 November 1607 and entered Lincoln's Inn in 1609. He succeeded his father in 1613.

In 1614, he was elected member of parliament for Flint. He was a justice of the peace for Flintshire from 1618 to c.1646 and was appointed High Sheriff of Flintshire for 1638–39.

Eyton married Susan, the daughter of Thomas Puleston of Lightwood, Overton, Flintshire and had at least three sons (two of whom predeceased him) and four daughters.

Parliament of England
Preceded by Roger Brereton	Member of Parliament for Flint; 1614	Succeeded by William Ravenscroft
