= 1913 Flint Boroughs by-election =

UK parliamentary by-election in Wales

The 1913 Flint Boroughs by-election was a Parliamentary by-election held on 21 January 1913. The constituency returned one Member of Parliament (MP) to the House of Commons of the United Kingdom, elected by the first past the post voting system.

== Vacancy ==
James Summers who had been Liberal MP for Flint Boroughs since January 1910, died on 1 January 1913.

== Previous result ==
General election December 1910
| Party | Candidate | Votes | % | ±% |
|---|---|---|---|---|
| Liberal | James Woolley Summers | 2,098 | 56.9 | +1.4 |
| Conservative | Henry Richard Lloyd Howard | 1,589 | 43.1 | −1.4 |
| Majority | | 509 | 13.8 | +2.8 |
| Turnout | | 3,687 | 90.8 | −4.6 |
| Registered electors | | 4,060 | | |
| Liberal hold | | Swing | +1.4 | |

== Candidates ==
The Liberals selected Thomas Parry to defend the seat. The constituency included Parry's home town of Mold where he was a prominent lawyer.

== Campaign ==
The Liberals had held the seat since gaining it from the Conservatives in 1847.

== Result ==
The Liberal Party held the seat with a reduced majority.

Thomas Parry

1913 Flint Boroughs by-election
| Party | Candidate | Votes | % | ±% |
|---|---|---|---|---|
| Liberal | Thomas Henry Parry | 2,152 | 52.6 | −4.3 |
| Unionist | J. Hamlet Roberts | 1,941 | 47.4 | +4.3 |
| Majority | | 211 | 5.2 | −8.6 |
| Turnout | | 4,093 | 94.1 | +3.3 |
| Registered electors | | 4,350 | | |
| Liberal hold | | Swing | -4.3 | |

== Aftermath ==
A General Election was due to take place by the end of 1915. By the summer of 1914, the following candidates had been adopted to contest that election. Due to the outbreak of war, the election never took place.

General Election 1914/15
| Party | Candidate | Votes | % | ±% |
|---|---|---|---|---|
| Liberal | Thomas Henry Parry | | | |
| Unionist | J. Hamlet Roberts | | | |
| Registered electors | | 4,560 | | |

The constituency disappeared in boundary changes in 1918 so Parry transferred to the county seat of Flintshire. Parry received the coalition government coupon at the 1918 general election and was returned unopposed
