= Ernest Roberts (Conservative politician) =

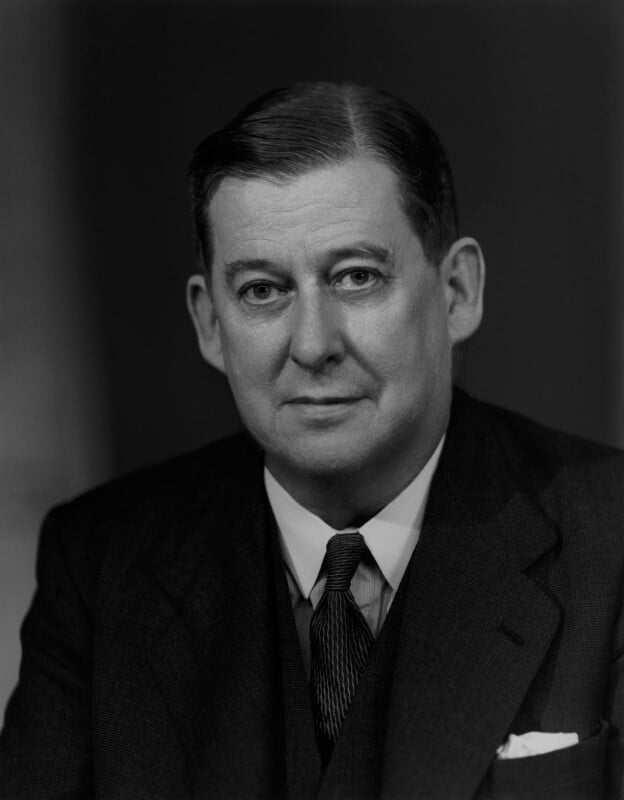
Roberts in 1950

Sir Ernest Handforth Goodman Roberts (20 April 1890 – 14 February 1969) was a Welsh barrister and Conservative Party politician who served as Member of Parliament (MP) for Flintshire from 1924 to 1929, before becoming the Chief Justice of the Rangoon High Court.

== Biography ==
Roberts was educated at Malvern College and Trinity College, Oxford, where he was President of the Oxford Union. During the First World War, he was a captain in the Royal Welch Fusiliers and a court-martial officer in Palestine, for which he was mentioned in despatches.

Roberts was called to the Bar at the Inner Temple in 1916. He first stood for election to the House of Commons at the 1923 general election, when he failed to unseat the sitting Liberal MP Thomas Henry Parry. At the 1924 general election, when the reappearance of a Labour Party candidate split created a 3-way contest, he won the seat by a comfortable majority of 12% of the votes. He was defeated at the 1929 general election, and did not stand for Parliament again.

From 1936, when he was knighted, to 1948 he was the Chief Justice of the High Court of Judicature at Rangoon. He was made a Queen's Counsel in 1949 and frequently served as Commissioner of Assize.

Parliament of the United Kingdom
Preceded by Tom Parry	Member of Parliament for Flintshire; 1924 – 1929	Succeeded by Frederick Llewellyn-Jones
