= John Salusbury (MP) =

John Salusbury (died 29 October 1685) was a Welsh politician who sat in the House of Commons at various times between 1626 and 1643. He supported the Royalist cause in the English Civil War.

Salusbury was the son of Roger or Robert Salusbury and his wife Catherine Clough, daughter of Sir Richard Clough.

In 1626 Salusbury was elected Member of Parliament for Flint. He was elected MP for Denbigh in the Short Parliament in April 1640 and was elected MP for Flint again for the Long Parliament in November 1640. He was disabled from sitting in Parliament on 5 February 1643 for joining the King at Oxford.

After the Restoration in 1660 Salusbury was one of those nominated Knight of the Royal Oak. He was Colonel of Denbighshire Horse Militia in 1666.

Salusbury died at a great age in 1685.

Salusbury married Elizabeth Ravenscroft, daughter of Thomas Ravenscroft of Bretton.

Parliament of England
Preceded by William Ravenscroft	Member of Parliament for Flint; 1626	Succeeded by William Ravenscroft
Vacant Parliament suspended since 1629 Title last held by Hugh Myddelton	Member of Parliament for Denbigh; 1640	Succeeded by Simon Thelwall
Preceded by Sir Thomas Hanmer, 2nd Baronet	Member of Parliament for Flint; 1640–1643	Succeeded by Sir Thomas Myddelton, 1st Baronet
