= 1872 Flint Boroughs by-election =

UK Parliamentary by-election

The 1872 Flint Boroughs by-election was fought on 16 October 1872. The by-election was fought due to the incumbent Liberal MP, Sir John Hanmer, being elevated to the peerage. It was, as expected, won by the Liberal candidate Sir Robert Cunliffe, who was unopposed.

== Result ==
1872 Flint Boroughs by-election
Party	Candidate	Votes	%	±%
Liberal	Robert Cunliffe	Unopposed		
Registered electors				
Liberal hold				
