= William Ravenscroft =

English member of Parliament (b. 1561 – d. 1628)

William Ravenscroft (1561 – 27 October 1628) was an English politician who sat in the House of Commons at various times between 1586 and 1628.

Ravenscroft was the son of George Ravenscroft. He was educated at Brasenose College, Oxford in 1578, aged 17 and was awarded BA in 1580. He entered Lincoln's Inn in 1580.

In 1586, he was elected Member of Parliament for Flintshire. He was called to the bar in 1589. In 1597 he was elected again as MP for Flintshire. He became Clerk of the Petty Bag for life in 1598. In 1601 he was re-elected MP for Flintshire. He was elected MP for Old Sarum in 1604 and 1614. In 1621 he was elected MP for Flint. He became associate bencher and treasurer of Lincoln's Inn in 1621 and became master of the library in 1624. In 1624 he was re-elected MP for Flint. He was elected MP for Flint again in 1625 and 1628.

Ravenscroft died unmarried at the age of about 67.

Parliament of England
Preceded by John Hope	Member of Parliament for Flintshire; 1586	Succeeded by Roger Puleston
Preceded by Sir Thomas Hanmer	Member of Parliament for Flintshire; 1597–1601	Succeeded by Roger Puleston
Preceded by Robert Turner; Henry Hyde	Member of Parliament for Old Sarum; 1604–1614; With: Edward Leache 1604–1611; William Price	Succeeded by George Myne; Thomas Brett
Preceded by John Eyton	Member of Parliament for Flint; 1621–1625	Succeeded by John Salusbury
Preceded by John Salusbury	Member of Parliament for Flint; 1628	Parliament suspended until 1640
