= John Roberts (Flint MP) =

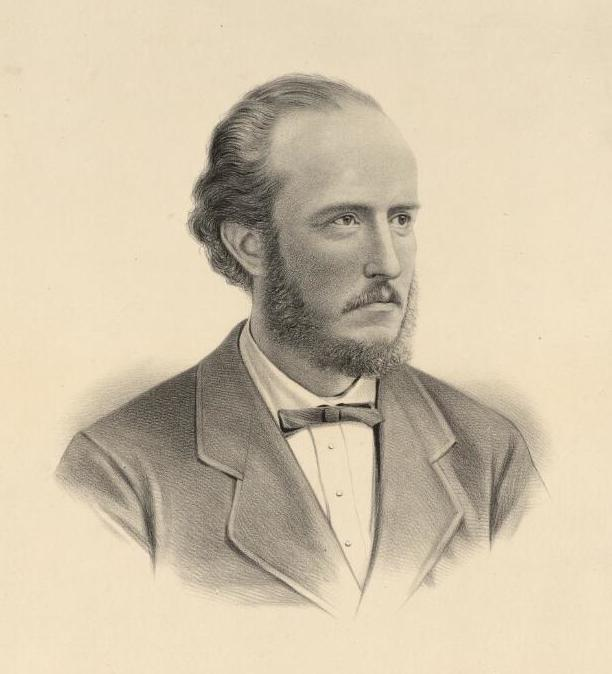
Portrait of John Roberts

John Roberts (14 July 1835 – 24 February 1894), was a Welsh Liberal Party politician.

Roberts was the son of David Roberts. His father, who was born in Llanrwst Wales, moved to Liverpool at an early age, where he built up a successful timber business, and later settled in Abergele. Roberts was educated at Brighton. He was a magistrate for Denbighshire and constructed the mansion of Bryngwenallt in Abergele.

In a by-election in 1878, Roberts was elected to the House of Commons as the member of parliament (MP) for Flint Boroughs. He held the seat until 1892.

Roberts died two years later at the age of 58.

Roberts married Katharine Tudor Hughes, daughter of Rev. John Hughes, of Liverpool. Their son John became a Liberal politician and was created Baron Clwyd in 1919.

Parliament of the United Kingdom
Preceded by Peter Ellis Eyton	Member of Parliament for Flint Boroughs; 1878–1892	Succeeded by John Herbert Lewis
