= Tom Parry (politician) =

British politician (1881–1939)

Thomas Parry DSO DL
- Parry in 1913

Member of Parliament for Flintshire
- In office 14 December 1918 – 29 October 1924
- Preceded by: Herbert Lewis
- Succeeded by: Ernest Roberts

Member of Parliament for Flint Boroughs
- In office 21 January 1913 – 14 December 1918
- Preceded by: James Woolley Summers
- Succeeded by: Constituency abolished

Personal details
- Born: Thomas Henry Parry; 1881 Mold, Flintshire, Wales, UK
- Died: 8 October 1939 (aged 57–58)
- Party: Liberal (–1916, 1923–)
- Other political affiliations: Coalition Liberal (1916–1922); National Liberal (1922–1923)
- Parent: Thomas Parry (father)
- Education: University College, Aberystwyth; Christ's College, Cambridge
- Occupation: Lawyer

Thomas Henry Parry, DSO, DL (1881 – 8 October 1939) was a Welsh Liberal Party politician, lawyer and soldier.

== Date of birth ==
The Times in its obituary of Parry reported he was aged 58 at death making his date of birth 1881. This is also the date given in the publication Who Was Who. It was reported at the time Parry was adopted as the Liberal candidate for the 1913 Flint Boroughs by-election that he was aged 32 years. His age at death was also given as 58 years in the Law Journal.

== Birth and education ==
Parry was born in Mold in Flintshire the son of Thomas Parry JP. He was educated at University College, Aberystwyth and Christ's College, Cambridge where he received his MA and LL.B degrees with honours.

== Law and the Army ==
Parry was called to the Bar at the Inner Temple and practised as a member of Chester and North Wales Circuit. At the outbreak of the First World War, Parry enlisted and was a subaltern in the 5th Royal Welch Fusiliers, Territorials. He served in the European theatre, Gallipoli, Egypt and Palestine between 1914 and 1919. He was wounded at Suvla Bay and hospitalised in Cairo. By the time of his injury at Suvla, where he also contracted frostbite, Parry had risen to the rank of captain. He was also wounded three times in action in Gaza, by which time he had risen to the rank of major, in which conflict he won the Distinguished Service Order in 1917. For his bravery in other actions Parry was mentioned in dispatches and won the Order of the Nile.

After the war, Parry continued to be associated with the Royal Welch Fusiliers. By November 1918 he had achieved the rank of major, by May 1919 he had risen to the rank of colonel, and by August 1919 he was lieutenant-colonel. He ended up lieutenant-colonel commanding the 5/6 Royal Welch Fusiliers and was Military Member of the Flintshire Territorial Force Association.

== Political career ==
Parry entered Parliament at a by-election in January 1913 following the death of the sitting Liberal member for Flint Boroughs, James Woolley Summers. The constituency included Parry's home town of Mold where he was a prominent lawyer and he was elected with a majority of 211 votes over the Unionist, J H Roberts – as usual in these contests a reduced majority from the previous election when Summers had a majority of 509. The constituency disappeared in boundary changes in 1918 so Parry transferred to the county seat of Flintshire. Parry received the coalition government coupon at the 1918 general election and was returned unopposed At the 1922 general election Parry faced Labour and Unionist opponents but held the seat. Labour did not contest the seat at the 1923 election but again Parry held off a challenge from the Tories. He was unable to campaign in Flintshire at the 1924 general election through illness brought on as a result of his war wounds and the seat passed into Conservative hands.

In 1922, Parry had been appointed as deputy lieutenant of Flintshire. One of his other duties was as a member of the Regional Pension Advisory Committee for Wales.

== Death ==
Parry died at his home in Mold on 8 October 1939 having been ill with pneumonia.

Parliament of the United Kingdom
Preceded by James Woolley Summers	Member of Parliament for Flint Boroughs; 1913 – 1918	Constituency abolished
Preceded by Herbert Lewis	Member of Parliament for Flintshire; 1918 – 1924	Succeeded by Ernest Roberts
