= Charles Whitley Deans Dundas =

Charles Whitley Deans Dundas (18 January 1811 – 11 April 1856) was a British soldier and politician.

== Background ==
Dundas was the son of Admiral Sir James Whitley Deans Dundas and Janet Dundas, he was the heir of the Aston Hall estate in Flintshire.

== Military career ==
At 17 he joined the Black Watch Regiment as an ensign (promoted to lieutenant). In 1830 he moved to the Coldstream Guard where he served until 1837. After retiring from the full-time army he served as Captain in the Militia of Lancashire County.

== Parliamentary career ==
In 1837 he was elected member of Parliament for Flintshire Boroughs, serving until 1841.

== Personal life ==
He married Janet Lindsey Jardine (his cousin) in 1837; they had one son Charles Amesbury Whitley Deans Dundas, who became the heir of Aston Hall on the death of his grandfather in 1862.

Charles Dundas died in Edinburgh on 11 April 1856.

Parliament of the United Kingdom
Preceded by Sir Stephen Glynne, 9th Baronet	Member of Parliament for Flint Boroughs; 1837–1841	Succeeded by Sir Richard Williams-Bulkeley, 10th Baronet
