= Frederick Llewellyn-Jones =

Frederick Llewellyn-Jones MP
- Frederick Llewellyn-Jones

Member of Parliament for Flintshire
- In office 1929–1935
- Preceded by: Ernest Roberts
- Succeeded by: Gwilym Rowlands

Personal details
- Born: 18 April 1866 Bethesda, Caernarfonshire, Wales
- Died: 11 January 1941 (aged 74) Isfryn, Mold, Flintshire, Wales
- Party: Liberal National, prev. Liberal
- Education: Friars School, Bangor; Bala College; University College of Wales, Aberystwyth; University of London
- Occupation: Solicitor, politician

Frederick Llewellyn-Jones, MP (18 April 1866 – 11 January 1941) was a Welsh solicitor who became Coroner for the county of Flintshire and a Liberal, later Liberal National politician.

== Early life ==
Frederick Llewellyn-Jones was born at Bethesda, Caernarfonshire. He received his education at Friars School, Bangor and Bala College. He then attended University College of Wales, Aberystwyth. He obtained BA degrees from the Universities of Wales and London and the law degree LLB from London.

== Career ==
Llewellyn-Jones was admitted as a solicitor in 1891. Over the years he was a member of a number of domestic and international organisations connected to the law, including the International Law Association from 1912 to 1939, the Grotius Society of London from 1915 to 1939, the American Society of International Law, other English and foreign Peace and International Law Societies, the Society of Comparative Legislation and Société de Législation Comparée of Paris and the Medico-Legal Society of London, 1915–1938.

He took a particular interest in National Insurance and health matters. He was chairman of Flintshire Insurance Committee, 1912–1940; the president (1937–38) of the Association of Welsh Insurance Committees and president of the Federation of English, Scottish, and Welsh Insurance Committees, 1924–1926, 1929–1931, and 1934–1937. He was appointed by the National Insurance Commissioners and Ministry of Health to be a member of successive advisory committees and of the Welsh Consultative Health Council. He also served as a member of the Central Council for Health Education, 1923–1940. For many years he served as HM Coroner for Flintshire.

== Politics ==
In 1914 he was selected as the Liberal party prospective parliamentary candidate for Preston. However, by early 1918 he had relinquished that role and announced his intention to contest the University of Wales as a Labour candidate. Llewellyn-Jones was elected Liberal Member of Parliament (MP) for Flintshire at the 1929 general election. However, in 1931 an economic crisis led to the formation of a National Government led by Labour Prime Minister Ramsay MacDonald. The government was initially supported by the Conservative and Liberal parties, and a rump of National Labour MPs. However the Liberals were increasingly divided over the existence of the National Government, particularly over the issue Free Trade. The official party led by Sir Herbert Samuel, although agreeing to go into the 1931 general election supporting the government became more and more worried about the government's stance on Free Trade and concerned about the predominance of the Conservatives in the coalition. However a group of Liberal MPs led by Sir John Simon who were concerned to ensure the National Government had a wide cross-party base, formed the Liberal National Party to more openly support MacDonald's administration.

Llewellyn-Jones was one of 22 Liberal MPs who met in ‘secret conclave’ on the evening of 5 October 1931. The meeting resolved to form itself into a body to give firm support to the prime minister as the head of a national government and for the purpose of fighting a general election. Sir John Simon wrote to the Prime Minister that night to give him the news and the decision was made to call the group Liberal Nationals. After that, Llewellyn-Jones sat in the House of Commons as a Liberal National. At the 1931 general election, when the official and Liberal National groups were still both supporting the government, Llewellyn-Jones was not opposed in Flintshire either by a Free Trade Liberal or Conservative candidate. However, there was opposition to his decision to associate with the Liberal Nationals within the Flintshire Liberal Association. At the meeting held to discuss the general election, Llewellyn-Jones threw down the gauntlet to the Association proclaiming that whether or not they adopted him he would stand anyway, secure in the knowledge that the Conservatives had already agreed not to put up a candidate in the seat. The atmosphere at the meeting was reported as ‘stormy’ by The Times but Llewellyn-Jones got the support of more than half those voting at the meeting. An interesting detail from the election was the public support offered to Llewellyn-Jones by Henry Neville Gladstone, the only surviving son of the great Liberal statesman William Ewart Gladstone whose family home, Hawarden Castle, was located in the constituency. On election day, Llewellyn-Jones found himself opposed only by the Labour Party candidate Miss F Edwards and he was returned to Parliament with the massive majority of 24, 247 votes.

== Changing back and resignation ==
While he gained election as a Liberal National with Conservative assent and joined the Liberal National group in the House of Commons, Llewellyn-Jones was not mere coalition lobby-fodder. In 1932 he resigned from the Liberal National group and re-took the Liberal whip. In November 1932 a vote of no confidence in him was passed by the Flintshire Conservatives, for persistently voting against the government on fiscal matters, including the Ottawa Agreements. In February 1934, Llewellyn-Jones issued a statement to the effect that he would not stand again at the next general election on the grounds of age and the need for new blood in the constituency.

== Honors ==
Later in life he received the Honorary degree of Doctor of Political Science from the University of Pécs in Hungary.

Llewellyn-Jones was made a member of the Royal Hungarian Order of Merit.

== Personal life ==
In 1892 he married Elizabeth Roberts from Ruthin. They had three sons and two daughters.

Llewellyn-Jones was chairman of the Holywell School Board 1898–1904, a member of Flintshire Joint Education Committee; a Member of the Court of Governors of the University Colleges of Wales, Aberystwyth and Bangor as well as serving as a member of the Welsh University Court and the Court of Governors of the National Library of Wales and of the Welsh National Museum.

He also served as the president of the Welsh League of Nations Union in 1933. In support of Welsh language and culture, he was a member of the Honourable Society of Cymmrodorion and of the Gorsedd of the National Eisteddfod of Wales.

Llewellyn-Jones died at Isfryn, Mold, Flintshire on 11 January 1941.

== See also ==
- List of Liberal Party (UK) MPs

Parliament of the United Kingdom
Preceded by Ernest Roberts	Member of Parliament for Flintshire; 1929 – 1935	Succeeded by Gwilym Rowlands
