= William Beesley =

Recipient of the Victoria Cross

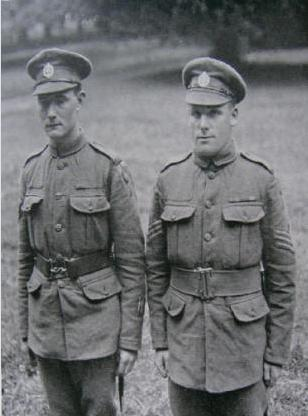
- William Beesley (left) and William Gregg
- Born: 5 October 1895; Gresley, Derbyshire
- Died: 23 September 1966 (aged 70); Abergavenny, Monmouthshire
- Burial place: St Paul's Cemetery, Coventry
- Military career
- Allegiance: United Kingdom
- Branch: British Army
- Service years: 1914–1919
- Rank: Sergeant
- Units: The Rifle Brigade; King's Royal Rifle Corps; Royal Artillery
- Conflicts: World War I: Western Front; World War II
- Awards: Victoria Cross

William Beesley VC (5 October 1895 – 23 September 1966) was an English recipient of the Victoria Cross, the highest and most prestigious award for gallantry in the face of the enemy that can be awarded to British and Commonwealth forces.

== Life ==
Beesley was 22 years old, and a private in the 13th Battalion, The Rifle Brigade (Prince Consort's Own), British Army during the First World War when the following deed took place for which he was awarded the VC.

On 8 May 1918 at Bucquoy, France, when Private Beesley's platoon sergeant and all the section commanders were killed he took command. Single-handed he rushed a post, shot four of the enemy, took six prisoners and sent them back to his lines. He and a comrade then brought his Lewis gun into action, inflicting many casualties and holding their position for four hours until the second private was wounded. Private Beesley, by himself, maintained his position until nightfall, when he returned to the original line with the wounded man and the Lewis gun which he kept in action until things had quietened down.

He later achieved the rank of sergeant.

His Victoria Cross is displayed at the Royal Green Jackets (Rifles) Museum in Winchester, England.

== Bibliography ==
- Buzzell, Nora, ed. (1997). The Register of the Victoria Cross. Cheltenham, Gloucestershire: This England Alma House. ISBN 0-906324-27-0.
- Gliddon, Gerald (2013) [2004]. Spring Offensive 1918. VCs of the First World War. Stroud, Gloucestershire: The History Press. ISBN 978-0-7524-8730-4.
- Harvey, David (2000). Monuments to Courage. Naval & Military Press Ltd. ISBN 1-84342-356-1.
