= Foster Cunliffe =

English cricketer and historian

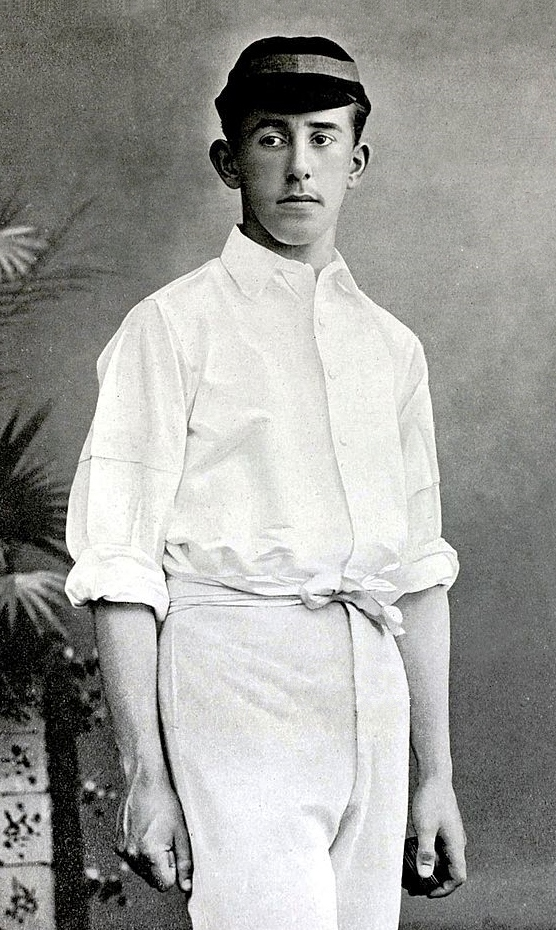
- Cunliffe in around 1895

Personal information
- Born: 17 August 1875; Belgravia, London, England
- Died: 10 July 1916 (aged 40); Ovillers-la-Boisselle, France
- Batting: Left-handed
- Bowling: Left-arm medium

Domestic team information
- Years: Team
- 1895–1898: Oxford University Cricket Club
- 1897–1903: Middlesex County Cricket Club
- 1899–1903: MCC

Career statistics
Competition	First-class
Matches	56
Runs scored	1,053
Batting average	15.26
100s/50s	0/0
Top score	70
Balls bowled	11,304
Wickets	235
Bowling average	21.78
5 wickets in innings	15
10 wickets in match	10
Best bowling	8/26
Catches/stumpings	25/–
- Source: CricInfo, 5 November 2022

Sir Foster Hugh Egerton Cunliffe, 6th Baronet (17 August 1875 – 10 July 1916) was an English historian and first-class cricketer who played for Oxford University from 1895 to 1898, for Middlesex from 1897 to 1903 and for Marylebone Cricket Club (MCC) from 1899 to 1903. He was killed serving in World War I.

== Biography ==
Cunliffe was born in Belgravia, Westminster, London, the son of Sir Robert Cunliffe, 5th Baronet of Acton Park, Wrexham, Denbighshire and his wife Eleanor Susan Emily Leigh daughter of Egerton Leigh. He was educated Eton College and at New College, Oxford and played cricket for the university from 1895 to 1898. In 1897 he made his debut for Middlesex and in 1899 began playing for MCC.

Cunliffe was a left-hand batsman and played 85 innings in 56 first-class matches with an average of 15.36 and a top score of 70. He was a left-arm medium pace bowler and took 235 first-class wickets with an average of 21.78 and a best performance of 8 for 26.

Cunliffe also played non-first class county cricket for Shropshire, in two matches in 1895.

Cunliffe became a Fellow of All Souls College, Oxford and the first lecturer in military history at Oxford University, 1905–1908. in this capacity he worked closely with the history tutor C.T. Atkinson of Exeter College, Oxford. He wrote The History of the Boer War. He inherited the baronetcy on the death of his father in 1905.

During World War I, Cunliffe served with the 13th (Service) Battalion, Rifle Brigade and reached the rank of major. He died of wounds at Ovillers-la-Boisselle, France. He was buried at Bapaume Post Military Cemetery, Albert, Somme. He is commemorated by a prayer book in the chapel at All Souls College, Oxford.

Baronetage of Great Britain
Preceded by Robert Cunliffe	Baronet (of Liverpool); 1905–1916	Succeeded by Robert Cunliffe
