= P. Ellis Eyton =

Liberal Member of UK Parliament

Peter Ellis Eyton MP

Member of Parliament for Flint Boroughs
- In office 31 January 1874 – 19 June 1878
- Preceded by: Robert Cunliffe
- Succeeded by: John Roberts

Personal details
- Born: 1827 Flint, Flintshire, Wales
- Died: 19 June 1878 (aged 50–51) Rhyl, Denbighshire, Wales
- Party: Liberal

Peter Ellis Eyton (1827 - 19 June 1878) was a Liberal Party politician.

He was elected Liberal MP for Flint Boroughs in 1874, but died in 1878 after four years in office.

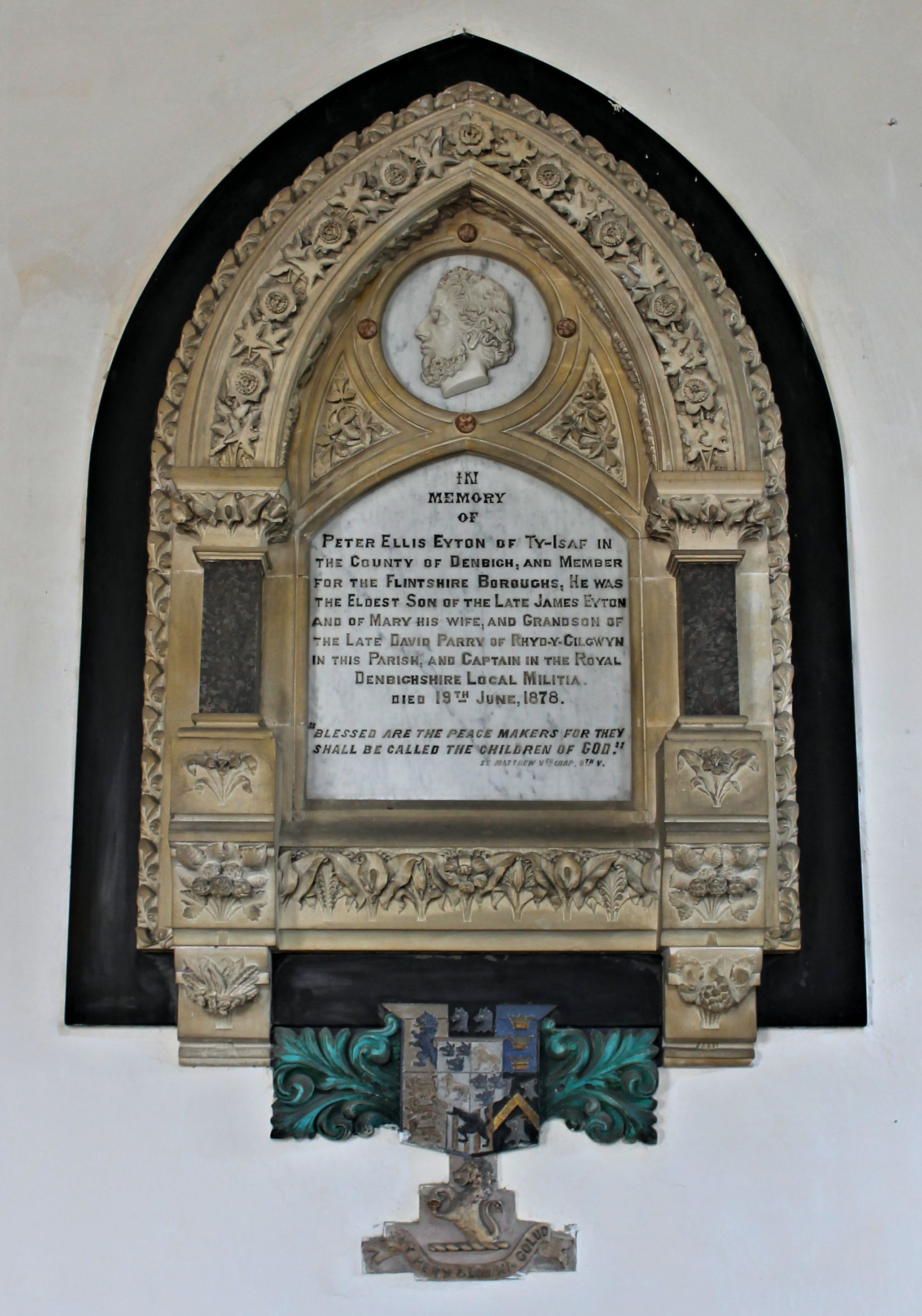
Monument to Peter Ellis Eyton, in St. Saeran's church, Llanynys, Denbighshire

Parliament of the United Kingdom
Preceded by Robert Cunliffe	Member of Parliament for Flint Boroughs; 1874 – 1878	Succeeded by John Roberts
