= Charles Cunliffe =

English cricketer (1858–1884)

Personal information
- Full name: Charles Morley Cunliffe (Note: Cunliffe's middle name is given as Morton in Rugby School sources. The Register of Rugby School also gives his date of death as September 1884.)
- Born: 2 September 1858; Leyton, Essex
- Died: 15 October 1884 (aged 26); Davos Platz, Switzerland
- Batting: Right-handed
- Bowling: Right-arm round arm medium
- Role: Bowler

Domestic team information
- Years: Team
- 1877–1880: Kent
- FC debut: 16 July 1877 Kent v Derbyshire
- Last FC: 30 August 1880 Kent v Surrey

Career statistics
Competition	First-class
Matches	25
Runs scored	378
Batting average	9.45
100s/50s	0/0
Top score	47
Balls bowled	3,347
Wickets	93
Bowling average	15.00
5 wickets in innings	11
10 wickets in match	3
Best bowling	7/25
Catches/stumpings	18/–
- Source: CricInfo, 30 April 2017

Charles Morley Cunliffe (2 September 1858 – 15 October 1884) was an English amateur cricketer who played for Kent County Cricket Club from 1877 to 1880. Cunliffe was one of Kent's leading slow bowlers of the time but was forced to give up cricket due to ill health. He died at a young age after suffering from tuberculosis.

== Early life and family ==
Cunliffe was born at Leyton in Essex in 1858, the son of Roger and Marion Cunliffe of Tunbridge Wells. His father was a banker in the London bank Roger Cunliffe, Sons and Company which had its origins in 1815 by Cunliffe's ancestor, a Lancashire merchant also named Roger. (Note: The history of the bank is complex. Cunliffe's grandfather – another Roger – created the bank in 1836, having split from Cunliffe, Brooks, Cunliffe and Company which had developed from the original 1815 London bank, which itself had been established in Blackburn in the late 18th century before becoming established in London. The bank which Cunliffe's father ran existed until 1941 when it was absorbed into Cater and Company.) The firm operated from 24 Bucklersbury and then, from 1867, at 6 Princes Street near the Bank of England.

After prep school, Cunliffe was educated at Rugby School where he was in the cricket XI for three years and established himself as an effective slow bowler.

== Cricket career ==
Cunliffe made his first-class cricket debut for Kent at Tunbridge Wells against Derbyshire in July 1877 at the age of 18 and was originally more prominent as a batsman in county cricket. He became a regular bowler for Kent during the following three seasons, taking five wickets in an innings 11 times, and 10 wickets in a match on three occasions. In 1880 he played in all ten of the county's first-class matches and was the leading bowler of the year, taking 51 wickets (Note: Cunliffe also took three wickets for the Gentlemen of Kent in 1880 and the figure of 54 wickets taken in 1880 is given in The History of Kent County Cricket Club.) at a bowling average of less than 13 runs per wicket.

Considered one of the finest slow bowlers Kent had produced to date, Cunliffe's bowling was described as: "pace very deceptive, with a great curl (Note: Curl can refer either the movement of the ball through the air or movement occurring from the wicket after the ball has pitched.) in the air". Writing in Wisden in 1907 George Marsham, who had watched Cunliffe play, was of the opinion that "even in these days of curlers I have been told that no bowler curled as much as Mr. C. M. Cunliffe" and he was "renowned for his break-back from the pitch" which Lord Harris described as "very puzzling". He played some club cricket for Orleans Club, but did not appear in any of the club's first-class matches, as well as for a range of other teams, including playing against the touring Australians for Hastings Cricket Club in 1878.

Cunliffe played in a total of 25 first-class matches, including two for the (amateur) Gentlemen of Kent. He made his final appearance in 1880, playing for Kent against Surrey at The Oval.

== Illness and death ==
Cunliffe was forced to stop playing cricket because of poor health. He suffered from tuberculosis and became progressively unwell. During the 1884 Canterbury Cricket Week Cunliffe is reported to have said: "Well I shan't be here next year but I'd like to be buried in the middle there to make a good bumpy pitch for our bowlers".

He died suddenly at Davos Platz (Note: The first sanatorium to treat tuberculosis was established at Davos by Alexander Spengler in the 1860s and the area had become a major centre for the treatment of the disease by the 1880s.) in Switzerland in October 1884 aged 26.

== Bibliography ==
- Carlaw, Derek (2020). Kent County Cricketers, A to Z: Part One (1806–1914) (PDF). Cardiff: ACS.
