= Sir Robert Cunliffe, 5th Baronet =

British politician (1839–1905)

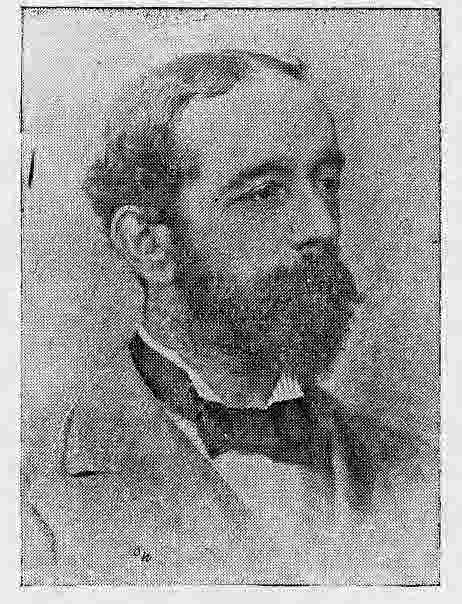
Robert A Cunliffe MP

Sir Robert Alfred Cunliffe, 5th Baronet (17 January 1839 – 18 June 1905) was a British Liberal politician who sat in the House of Commons in two periods between 1872 and 1885.

== Career ==
Cunliffe was the son of Robert Ellis Cunliffe (1807 - 1855), of the Bengal Civil Service. He was educated at Eton College and joined the Scots Fusilier Guards in 1857. In 1859, he succeeded his grandfather, General Sir Robert Henry Cunliffe, in the baronetcy.

He retired from the regular army in 1862 and became Lieutenant-Colonel commanding the Royal Denbigh Rifles Militia on 22 May 1872. He became the regiment's Honorary Colonel on 12 May 1886. He was a JP and DL for Denbighshire and High Sheriff of Denbighshire in 1868.

In 1872, Cunliffe was elected member of parliament for Flint Boroughs and held the seat until 1874. At the 1880 general election Cunliffe was elected MP for Denbigh Boroughs. He held the seat until 1885.

In 1892, he stood unsuccessfully for the Liberal Unionist Party.

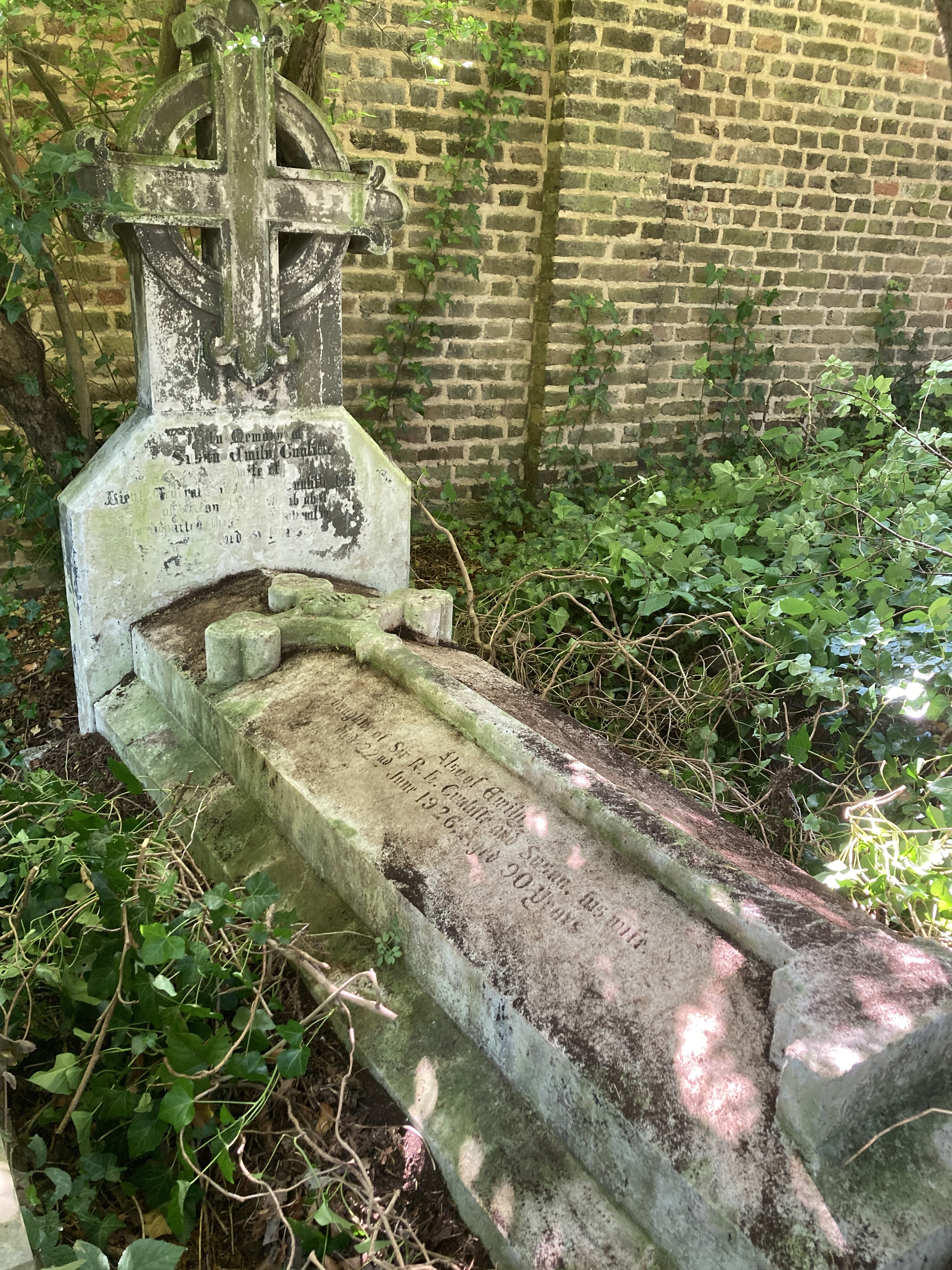
Family vault of Sir Robert Cunliffe, 5th Baronet in Highgate Cemetery

General election 1892: Flintshire
| Party | Candidate | Votes | % | ±% |
|---|---|---|---|---|
| Liberal | Samuel Smith | 4,597 | 59.4 | n/a |
| Liberal Unionist | Robert Cunliffe | 3,145 | 40.6 | n/a |
| Majority | | 1,452 | 18.8 | n/a |
| Turnout | | | 76.8 | n/a |
| Liberal hold | | Swing | n/a | |

Cunliffe died in 1905 at the age of 66 and was buried at Wrexham Cemetery.

== Family ==
Cunliffe married twice. He first married in 1869 Eleanor Sophia Egerton Leigh, only daughter of Major Egerton Leigh of West Hall High Leigh and Jodrell Hall, Cheshire. She died in 1898 and is also buried at Wrexham Cemetery.

He secondly married in Church of St Barnabas, Pimlico on 5 January 1901 Honourable Cecile Victoria Sackville-West, daughter of Hon. William Edward Sackville-West (1830–1905; a younger son of the 5th Earl De La Warr) by his wife Georgina Dodwell (d.1883). Her brother was Lionel Sackville-West, 3rd Baron Sackville, and after he succeeded an uncle as Baron in 1908, she was allowed to use the style the Honorable. Lady Cunliffe was appointed a Commander of the Order of the British Empire (CBE) in 1920. She survived her husband by 50 years and died in 1955.

With his first wife he had a son Foster Cunliffe who was a cricketer and historian and died fighting in World War I and a daughter Mary (born circa 1879).

Parliament of the United Kingdom
| Preceded by Sir John Hanmer, Bt | Member of Parliament for Flint Boroughs; 1872 – 1874 | Succeeded by P. Ellis Eyton |
| Preceded by Watkin Williams | Member of Parliament for Denbigh Boroughs; 1880 – 1885 | Succeeded by George Thomas Kenyon |
Baronetage of Great Britain
| Preceded by Robert Henry Cunliffe | Baronet (of Liverpool); 1859–1905 | Succeeded by Foster Cunliffe |
