= William Gregg (VC) =

English Victoria Cross recipient (1890–1969)

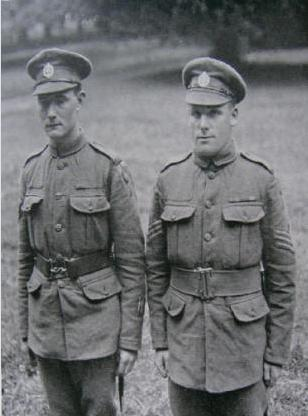
- William Beesley (left) and William Gregg
- Born: 27 January 1890; Heanor, Derbyshire, England
- Died: 10 August 1969 (aged 79); Heanor, Derbyshire, England
- Military career
- Allegiance: United Kingdom
- Branch: British Army
- Rank: Company Sergeant-Major
- Units: Rifle Brigade; The Sherwood Foresters
- Conflicts: First World War; Second World War
- Awards: Victoria Cross; Distinguished Conduct Medal; Military Medal

William Gregg, VC, DCM, MM (27 January 1890 – 10 August 1969) was a British soldier and a recipient of the Victoria Cross, the highest award for gallantry in the face of the enemy that can be awarded to British and Commonwealth forces.

== Details ==
He was 28 years old, and a sergeant in the 13th Battalion, The Rifle Brigade (Prince Consort's Own), British Army during the First World War when he performed a deed for which he was awarded the Victoria Cross.

On 8 May 1918 at Bucquoy, France, when all the officers of Sergeant Gregg's company had been hit during an attack on an enemy outpost, he took command, rushing two enemy posts, killing some of the gun teams, taking prisoners and capturing a machine-gun. He then started to consolidate his position until driven back by a counter-attack, but as reinforcements had by now come up, he led a charge, personally bombed a hostile machine-gun, killed the crew and captured the gun. When driven back again, he led another successful attack and held on to his position until ordered to withdraw.

== Further information ==
He later achieved the rank of company sergeant-major and served in World War II with the Sherwood Foresters.

== The medal ==
His Victoria Cross is displayed at the Royal Green Jackets (Rifles) Museum in Winchester, England.

== Local honours ==
William lived in Heanor, Derbyshire, and as testament to his deeds of gallantry when the town's new swimming baths were built in 1970 they were named the 'William Gregg V.C Swimming Baths' in his honour. That recognition was continued when the facilities were extended and privatised in 2009–10 as the 'William Gregg V.C. Leisure Centre.

== Bibliography ==
- Buzzell, Nora, ed. (1997). The Register of the Victoria Cross. Cheltenham, Gloucestershire: This England Alma House. ISBN 0-906324-27-0.
- Gliddon, Gerald (2013) [2004]. Spring Offensive 1918. VCs of the First World War. Stroud, Gloucestershire: The History Press. ISBN 978-0-7524-8730-4.
- Harvey, David (2000). Monuments to Courage. Naval & Military Press Ltd. ISBN 1-84342-356-1.
