= Flint Boroughs =

UK Parliament constituency (1542–1918)

- Former district of Boroughs constituency for the House of Commons
- Preserved county: Flintshire

1542–1918
- Seats: One
- Replaced by: Flintshire

Flint Boroughs (sometimes known as Flint or the Flint District of Boroughs) was a parliamentary constituency in north-east Wales which returned one Member of Parliament (MP) to the House of Commons of the Parliament of the United Kingdom and its predecessors, from 1542 until it was abolished for the 1918 general election.

== Boundaries ==
From its first known general election in 1542 until 1918, the constituency consisted of a number of boroughs within the historic county of Flintshire in north-east Wales. The seat should not be confused with the county constituency of Flintshire, which existed from the 16th century until 1950.

After 1918 Flintshire was represented in Parliament by the single member county constituency, which included all the boroughs formerly in the Flint District of Boroughs.

=== Flint 1535–1832 ===
On the basis of information from several volumes of the History of Parliament, it is apparent that the history of the borough representation of Wales and Monmouthshire is more complicated than that of the English boroughs.

The Laws in Wales Act 1535 (26 Hen. 8. c. 26) provided for a single borough seat for each of 11 of the 12 Welsh counties and Monmouthshire. The legislation was ambiguous as to which communities were enfranchised. The county towns were awarded a seat, but these seats in some way represented all the ancient boroughs of the county, as the boroughs other than county towns were also required to contribute to the members' wages. It is not clear whether the burgesses of the contributing boroughs could vote in the election. The only election under the original scheme was that for the 1542 parliament. It seems that only burgesses from the county towns actually took part. The Parliament Act 1543 (35 Hen. 8. c. 11) confirmed that the contributing boroughs could send representatives to take part in the election at the county town. As far as can be told from surviving indentures of returns, the degree to which the out boroughs participated varied, but by the end of the 16th century all the seats had some participation from them at some elections at least.

The original scheme was modified by later legislation and decisions of the House of Commons (which were sometimes made with no regard to precedent or evidence: for example in 1728 it was decided that only the freemen of the borough of Montgomery could participate in the election for that seat, thus disenfranchising the freemen of Llanidloes, Welshpool and Llanfyllin).

In the case of Flintshire, the county town was Flint. The out boroughs were Caergwrle, Caerwys, Overton and Rhuddlan.

In 1690–1715 the freemen of the five boroughs were entitled to vote. The exact number is unknown, but in the only poll of the period (a by-election in 1697) there were 760 voters.

Between 1715 and 1754 the House of Commons changed the franchise of the constituency. In 1727 there were about 1000 freemen entitled to vote. Thereafter the inhabitants of the five boroughs, paying scot and lot (a local tax), formed the electorate. They numbered about 600.

From 1754 to 1790, there were still about 600 voters. Namier and Brooke point out that the constituency was controlled by local squires. No election went to a poll in that period.

=== Flint Boroughs 1832–1918 ===
The Flint Boroughs was a district of boroughs constituency, which grouped a number of parliamentary boroughs in Flintshire into one single member constituency. The voters from each participating borough cast ballots, which were added together over the whole district to decide the result of the poll. The enfranchised communities in this district, from 1832, were the eight boroughs of Flint, Caergwrle, Caerwys, Holywell, Mold, Overton, Rhuddlan and St Asaph.

The boundaries of the parliamentary boroughs in the district were altered by the Parliamentary Boundaries Act 1868, but the general nature of the constituency was unchanged. There were no further boundary changes in the 1885 redistribution of parliamentary seats.

== Members of Parliament ==
=== Members of Parliament 1542–1640 ===
As there were sometimes significant gaps between Parliaments held in this period, the dates of first assembly and dissolution are given. Where the name of the member has not yet been ascertained or is not recorded in a surviving document, the entry unknown is entered in the table.

Elected	Assembled	Dissolved	Member	Note
1542	16 January 1542	28 March 1544	unknown	
1545	23 November 1545	31 January 1547	Thomas Salusbury	
1547	4 November 1547	15 April 1552	Robert Massey	
1553	1 March 1553	31 March 1553	Edward Stanley	
1553	5 October 1553	5 December 1553	Edward Stanley	
1554	2 April 1554	3 May 1554	?Robert Massey	
1554	12 November 1554	16 January 1555	Robert Massey	
1555	21 October 1555	9 December 1555	Edward Stanley II	
1558	20 January 1558	17 November 1558	Peter Mostyn	
1559	23 January 1559	8 May 1559	John Hanmer	
1562–3	11 January 1563	2 January 1567	John Conway	
1571	2 April 1571	29 May 1571	John Hanmer	
1572	8 May 1572	19 April 1583	Humphrey Hanmer	
1584	23 November 1584	14 September 1585	Richard Lloyd	
1586	13 October 1586	23 March 1587	Michael Doughty	
1588	4 February 1589	29 March 1589	John Edwards	
1593	18 February 1593	10 April 1593	Thomas Griffith	
1597	24 October 1597	9 February 1598	Edward Morgan	
1601	27 October 1601	19 December 1601	John Price	
1604	19 March 1604	9 February 1611	Roger Brereton	
1614	5 April 1614	7 June 1614	John Eyton	
1620	16 January 1621	8 February 1622	William Ravenscroft	
1624	12 February 1624	27 March 1625	William Ravenscroft	
1625	17 May 1625	12 August 1625	William Ravenscroft	
1626	6 February 1626	15 June 1626	John Salusbury	
1628	17 March 1628	10 March 1629	William Ravenscroft	
1640	13 April 1640	5 May 1640	Sir Thomas Hanmer, Bt	

=== Members of Parliament 1640–1660 ===
This sub-section includes the Long Parliament and the Rump Parliament, together with the Parliaments of the Commonwealth and the Protectorate (before the Convention Parliament of 1660).

Elected	Assembled	Dissolved	Member	Note
1640	3 November 1640	5 December 1648	John Salusbury; Disabled 1643; Thomas Myddelton; 1646–1648	Long Parliament
...	6 December 1648	20 April 1653	unrepresented	Rump Parliament
...	4 July 1653	12 December 1653	unrepresented	Barebones Parliament
1654	3 September 1654	22 January 1655	unrepresented	First Protectorate Parliament
1656	17 September 1656	4 February 1658	unrepresented	Second Protectorate Parliament
1658–59	27 January 1659	22 April 1659	John Hanmer	Third Protectorate Parliament
...	7 May 1659	20 February 1660	unrepresented	Rump Parliament restored
...	21 February 1660	16 March 1660	unknown	Long Parliament restored

=== Members of Parliament 1660–1918 ===
First Election	Member	Party	Note
1660	Roger Whitley		
1681	Thomas Whitley		
1685	Sir John Hanmer, Bt		
1690	Thomas Whitley	Whig	
1695	Roger Puleston	Whig	Died 28 February 1697
1697	Thomas Ravenscroft	Whig	Died 3 May 1698
1698	Thomas Mostyn	Tory	
1701	Thomas Hanmer	Tory	Elected to sit for Thetford
1702	John Conway	Tory	
1702	Roger Mostyn	Tory	Elected to sit for Cheshire
1702	Thomas Mostyn	Tory	
1705	Roger Mostyn	Tory	
1708	John Conway	Tory	
1713	Roger Mostyn	Tory	
1715	John Conway		Died 27 April 1721
1721	Thomas Eyton		
1727	Salusbury Lloyd		A double return. The House of Commons seated Lloyd.
1734	Sir George Wynne, Bt		Unseated on petition
1742	Richard Williams		Declared duly elected, on petition
1747	Kyffin Williams		Died 30 October 1753
1753	John Glynne		Died 1 June 1777
1777 by-election	Watkin Williams		
1806	Sir Edward Lloyd, Bt		
1807	William Shipley		
1812	Edward Lloyd	Whig	Created the Lord Mostyn 1831
1831 by-election	Henry Glynne	Whig	Resigned
1832 by-election	Sir Stephen Glynne, Bt	Whig	
1835	Sir Stephen Glynne, Bt	Conservative	
1837	Charles Whitley Deans Dundas	Whig	
1841	Richard Williams-Bulkeley	Whig	
1847	John Hanmer	Peelite	
1859	John Hanmer	Liberal	Created the Lord Hanmer 1872
1872 by-election	Robert Cunliffe	Liberal	
1874	P. Ellis Eyton	Liberal	Died 19 June 1878
1878 by-election	John Roberts	Liberal	
1892	Herbert Lewis	Liberal	
1906	Howell Idris	Liberal	
Jan 1910	James Woolley Summers	Liberal	Died 1 January 1913
1913 by-election	Tom Parry	Liberal	
1916	Tom Parry	Coalition Liberal	
1918	Constituency abolished		

Supplemental Notes:-

- ^{1} F. W. S. Craig, in his compilations of election results for Great Britain, classifies Whig, Radical and similar candidates as Liberals from 1832. The name Liberal was gradually adopted as a description for the Whigs and politicians allied with them, before the formal creation of the Liberal Party shortly after the 1859 general election.

== Election results 1690-1713 ==
Sources 1690–1715: Cruickshanks et al.; 1715–1754: Stooks Smith; 1754–1784: Namier and Brooke; 1784–1832 Stooks Smith. Positive swing is from Whig to Tory. Source 1832–1918: Craig. Positive swing is from Liberal to Conservative.

General election 17 March 1690: Flint
Party	Candidate	Votes	%	±%
Whig	Thomas Whitley	Unopposed	N/A	N/A
Whig gain from ?		Swing	N/A	

General election 28 October 1695: Flint
Party	Candidate	Votes	%	±%
Whig	Roger Puleston	Unopposed	N/A	N/A
Whig hold		Swing	N/A	

- Death of Puleston

By-Election 8 April 1697: Flint
Party	Candidate	Votes	%	±%
Whig	Thomas Ravenscroft	510	67.1	N/A
Tory	John Hanmer	250	32.9	New
Majority		260	34.2	N/A
Turnout		760		N/A
Whig hold		Swing	N/A	

- Seat vacant at dissolution, on the death of Ravenscroft

General election 13 August 1698: Flint
Party	Candidate	Votes	%	±%
Tory	Thomas Mostyn	Unopposed	N/A	N/A
Tory gain from Whig		Swing	N/A	

General Election 11 January 1701: Flint
Party	Candidate	Votes	%	±%
Tory	Thomas Mostyn	Unopposed	N/A	N/A
Tory hold		Swing	N/A	

General Election 13 December 1701: Flint
Party	Candidate	Votes	%	±%
Tory	Thomas Hanmer	Unopposed	N/A	N/A
Tory hold		Swing	N/A	

- Hanmer was also returned by and elected to sit for Thetford

By-Election 2 February 1702: Flint
Party	Candidate	Votes	%	±%
Tory	John Conway	Unopposed	N/A	N/A
Tory hold		Swing	N/A	

General election 1 August 1702: Flint
Party	Candidate	Votes	%	±%
Tory	Roger Mostyn	Unopposed	N/A	N/A
Tory hold		Swing	N/A	

- Mostyn was also returned by and elected to sit for Cheshire

By-Election 2 December 1702: Flint
Party	Candidate	Votes	%	±%
Tory	Thomas Mostyn	Unopposed	N/A	N/A
Tory hold		Swing	N/A	

General election 29 May 1705: Flint
Party	Candidate	Votes	%	±%
Tory	Roger Mostyn	Unopposed	N/A	N/A
Tory hold		Swing	N/A	

General election 20 May 1708: Flint
Party	Candidate	Votes	%	±%
Tory	John Conway	Unopposed	N/A	N/A
Tory hold		Swing	N/A	

General election 17 October 1710: Flint
Party	Candidate	Votes	%	±%
Tory	John Conway	Unopposed	N/A	N/A
Tory hold		Swing	N/A	

General election 21 September 1713: Flint
Party	Candidate	Votes	%	±%
Tory	Roger Mostyn	Unopposed	N/A	N/A
Tory hold		Swing	N/A	

== Election results 1800-1832 ==
=== Elections in the 1830s ===
General election 1830: Flint Boroughs
Party	Candidate	Votes	%
Whig	Edward Lloyd	Unopposed	
Registered electors		c. 1,200	
Whig hold			

General election 1831: Flint Boroughs
Party	Candidate	Votes	%
Whig	Edward Lloyd	Unopposed	
Registered electors		c. 1,200	
Whig hold			

Lloyd was elevated to the peerage, becoming 1st Baron Mostyn and causing a by-election.

By-election, 22 September 1831: Flint Boroughs
Party	Candidate	Votes	%
Whig	Henry Glynne	Unopposed	
Registered electors		c. 1,200	
Whig hold			

Glynne resigned, causing a by-election.

By-election, 25 February 1832: Flint Boroughs
Party	Candidate	Votes	%
Whig	Stephen Glynne	Unopposed	
Registered electors		c. 1,185	
Whig hold			

== Election results 1832-1868 ==
=== Elections in the 1830s ===
General election 1832: Flint Boroughs
Party	Candidate	Votes	%
Whig	Stephen Glynne	Unopposed	
Registered electors		1,359	
Whig hold			

General election 1835: Flint Boroughs
Party	Candidate	Votes	%
Conservative	Stephen Glynne	Unopposed	
Registered electors		1,067	
Conservative gain from Whig			

General election 1837: Flint Boroughs
Party	Candidate	Votes	%
Whig	Charles Whitley Deans Dundas	591	60.1
Conservative	Robert John Mostyn	393	39.9
Majority		198	20.2
Turnout		984	75.9
Registered electors		1,297	
Whig gain from Conservative			

=== Elections in the 1840s ===
General election 1841: Flint Boroughs
Party	Candidate	Votes	%	±%
Whig	Richard Williams-Bulkeley	Unopposed		
Registered electors		1,006		
Whig hold				

General election 1847: Flint Boroughs
Party	Candidate	Votes	%	±%
Peelite	John Hanmer	Unopposed		
Registered electors		840		
Peelite gain from Whig				

=== Elections in the 1850s ===
General election 1852: Flint Boroughs
Party	Candidate	Votes	%	±%
Peelite	John Hanmer	386	59.1	N/A
Conservative	Richard Pelham Warren	267	40.9	N/A
Majority		119	18.2	N/A
Turnout		653	79.7	N/A
Registered electors		819		
Peelite hold		Swing	N/A	

General election 1857: Flint Boroughs
Party	Candidate	Votes	%	±%
Peelite	John Hanmer	Unopposed		
Registered electors		783		
Peelite hold				

General election 1859: Flint Boroughs
Party	Candidate	Votes	%	±%
Liberal	John Hanmer	Unopposed		
Registered electors		741		
Liberal hold				

=== Elections in the 1860s ===
General election 1865: Flint Boroughs
Party	Candidate	Votes	%	±%
Liberal	John Hanmer	Unopposed		
Registered electors		689		
Liberal hold				

== Election results 1868-1880 ==
=== Elections in the 1860s ===
General election 1868: Flint Boroughs
Party	Candidate	Votes	%	±%
Liberal	John Hanmer	Unopposed		
Registered electors		3,279		
Liberal hold				

=== Elections in the 1870s ===
Hanmer was raised to the peerage, becoming Lord Hanmer.

By-election, 16 Oct 1872: Flint Boroughs
Party	Candidate	Votes	%	±%
Liberal	Robert Cunliffe	Unopposed		
Liberal hold				

General election 1874: Flint Boroughs
Party	Candidate	Votes	%	±%
Liberal	P. Ellis Eyton	1,076	36.8	N/A
Conservative	Conwy Greville Hercules Rowley-Conwy	1,072	36.7	New
Liberal	Robert Cunliffe	772	26.4	N/A
Majority		4	0.1	N/A
Turnout		2,920	80.5	N/A
Registered electors		3,628		
Liberal hold		Swing		

Eyton's death caused a by-election.

By-election, 5 Jul 1878: Flint Boroughs
Party	Candidate	Votes	%	±%
Liberal	John Roberts	1,636	52.0	−11.2
Conservative	Philip Pennant Pennant	1,511	48.0	+11.3
Majority		125	4.0	+3.9
Turnout		3,147	84.9	+4.4
Registered electors		3,707		
Liberal hold		Swing	−11.2	

=== Elections in the 1880s ===
General election 1880: Flint Boroughs
Party	Candidate	Votes	%	±%
Liberal	John Roberts	2,039	58.1	−5.1
Conservative	Philip Pennant Pennant	1,468	41.9	+5.2
Majority		571	16.2	+16.1
Turnout		3,507	92.4	+11.9
Registered electors		3,794		
Liberal hold		Swing	−5.2	

== Election results 1885-1918 ==
=== Elections in the 1880s ===
General election 1885: Flint Boroughs
Party	Candidate	Votes	%	±%
Liberal	John Roberts	1,835	51.7	−6.4
Conservative	Philip Pennant Pennant	1,713	48.3	+6.4
Majority		122	3.4	−12.8
Turnout		3,548	94.0	+1.6
Registered electors		3,773		
Liberal hold		Swing		

General election 1886: Flint Boroughs
Party	Candidate	Votes	%	±%
Liberal	John Roberts	1,827	56.6	+4.9
Liberal Unionist	Sir Henry Mather-Jackson, 3rd Baronet	1,403	43.4	−4.9
Majority		424	13.2	+9.8
Turnout		3,230	85.6	−8.4
Registered electors		3,773		
Liberal hold		Swing	+4.9	

=== Elections in the 1890s ===
Lewis

General election 1892: Flint Boroughs
Party	Candidate	Votes	%	±%
Liberal	Herbert Lewis	1,883	55.3	−1.3
Conservative	Philip Pennant Pennant	1,524	44.7	+1.3
Majority		359	10.6	−2.6
Turnout		3,407	91.8	+6.2
Registered electors		3,710		
Liberal hold		Swing	-1.3	

General election 1895: Flint Boroughs
Party	Candidate	Votes	%	±%
Liberal	Herbert Lewis	1,828	52.4	−2.9
Conservative	Philip Pennant Pennant	1,663	47.6	+2.9
Majority		165	4.8	−5.8
Turnout		3,491	90.6	−1.2
Registered electors		3,853		
Liberal hold		Swing	-2.9	

=== Elections in the 1900s ===
General election 1900: Flint Boroughs
Party	Candidate	Votes	%	±%
Liberal	Herbert Lewis	1,760	55.5	+3.1
Conservative	John Lloyd-Price	1,413	44.5	−3.1
Majority		347	11.0	+6.2
Turnout		3,173	88.6	−2.0
Registered electors		3,581		
Liberal hold		Swing	+3.1	

Idris

General election 1906: Flint Boroughs
Party	Candidate	Votes	%	±%
Liberal	Howell Idris	1,899	55.5	0.0
Conservative	John Eldon Bankes	1,523	44.5	0.0
Majority		376	11.0	0.0
Turnout		3,422	93.5	+4.9
Registered electors		3,659		
Liberal hold		Swing	0.0	

=== Elections in the 1910s ===
General election January 1910: Flint Boroughs
Party	Candidate	Votes	%	±%
Liberal	James Woolley Summers	2,150	55.5	0.0
Conservative	H.A. Tilby	1,723	44.5	0.0
Majority		427	11.0	0.0
Turnout		3,873	95.4	+1.9
Liberal hold		Swing	0.0	

General election December 1910: Flint Boroughs
Party	Candidate	Votes	%	±%
Liberal	James Woolley Summers	2,098	56.9	+1.4
Conservative	Henry Howard	1,589	43.1	−1.4
Majority		509	13.8	+2.8
Turnout		3,687	90.8	−4.6
Liberal hold		Swing	+1.4	

Parry

1913 Flint Boroughs by-election
Party	Candidate	Votes	%	±%
Liberal	Tom Parry	2,152	52.6	−4.3
Unionist	J. Hamlet Roberts	1,941	47.4	+4.3
Majority		211	5.2	−8.6
Turnout		4,093	94.1	+3.3
Liberal hold		Swing	-4.3	

General Election 1914–15:

Another General Election was required to take place before the end of 1915. The political parties had been making preparations for an election to take place and by July 1914, the following candidates had been selected;

- Liberal: Tom Parry
- Unionist: J. Hamlet Roberts
