= Cunliffe baronets =

Title in the Baronetage of Great Britain

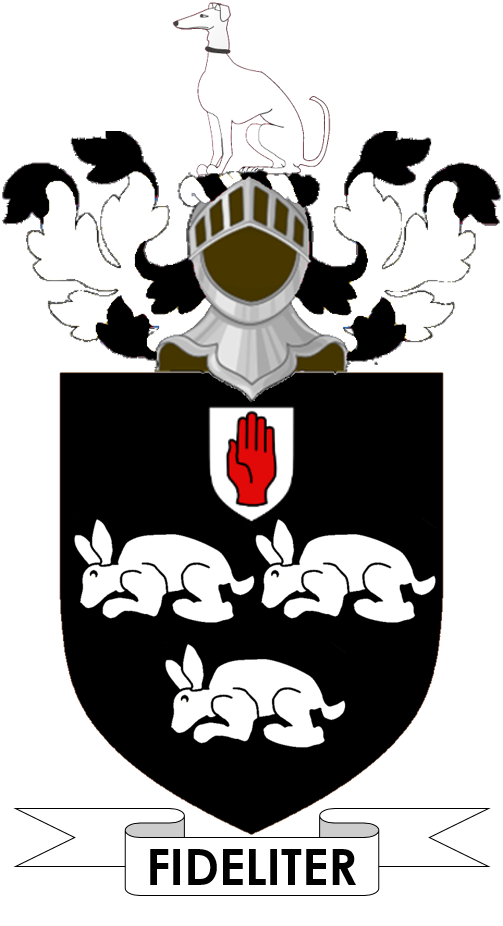
Arms: Sable three Conies courant argent; Crest: A Greyhound sejant Argent collared Sable; Motto: Fideliter (Faithfully)

The Cunliffe Baronetcy, of Liverpool in the County of Lancaster, is a title in the Baronetage of Great Britain. It was created on 26 March 1759 for Sir Ellis Cunliffe, a slave trader and Member of Parliament for Liverpool. The fourth Baronet was a General in the Bengal Army. The fifth Baronet represented Flint Boroughs and Denbigh Boroughs in the House of Commons.

== Cunliffe baronets, of Liverpool (1759) ==
- Sir Ellis Cunliffe, Kt., 1st Baronet (1717–1767)
- Sir Robert Cunliffe, 2nd Baronet (1719–1778)
- Sir Foster Cunliffe, 3rd Baronet (1755–1834)
- Sir Robert Henry Cunliffe, 4th Baronet, Kt., CB (1785–1859)
- Sir Robert Alfred Cunliffe, 5th Baronet (1839–1905)
- Sir Foster Hugh Egerton Cunliffe, 6th Baronet (1875–1916)
- Sir Robert Neville Henry Cunliffe, 7th Baronet (1884–1949)
- Sir Cyril Henley Cunliffe, 8th Baronet (1901–1969)
- Sir David Ellis Cunliffe, 9th Baronet (born 1957)

The heir presumptive is the present holder's younger brother Andrew Mark Cunliffe (born 1959).

== Extended family ==
Three other members of the family may also be mentioned. George Gordon Cunliffe (1829-1900), son of Brooke Cunliffe, fourth son of the third Baronet, was a major-general in the British Army. His son Frederick Hugh Gordon Cunliffe (1861–1955) was a brigadier-general in the Seaforth Highlanders. Robert Lionel Brooke Cunliffe, son of Colonel Foster Lionel Brooke, son of the aforementioned Brooke Cunliffe, fourth son of the third Baronet, was a captain in the Royal Navy.

== Notes ==
Baronetage of Great Britain
| Preceded by Wilmot baronets | Cunliffe baronets of Chaddesden; 26 March 1759 | Succeeded by Gideon baronets |
