= Daniel Cunliffe =

British artist (1801–1871)

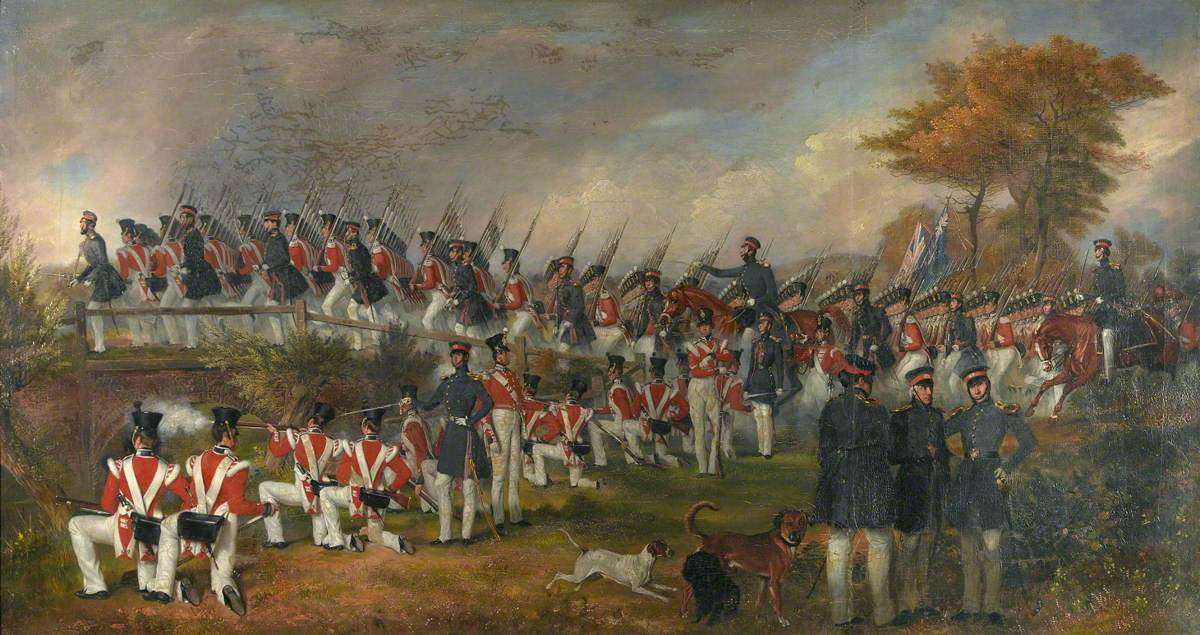
6th (1st Royal Warwickshire) Regiment of Foot on Exercise While Stationed at Portsmouth, 1943

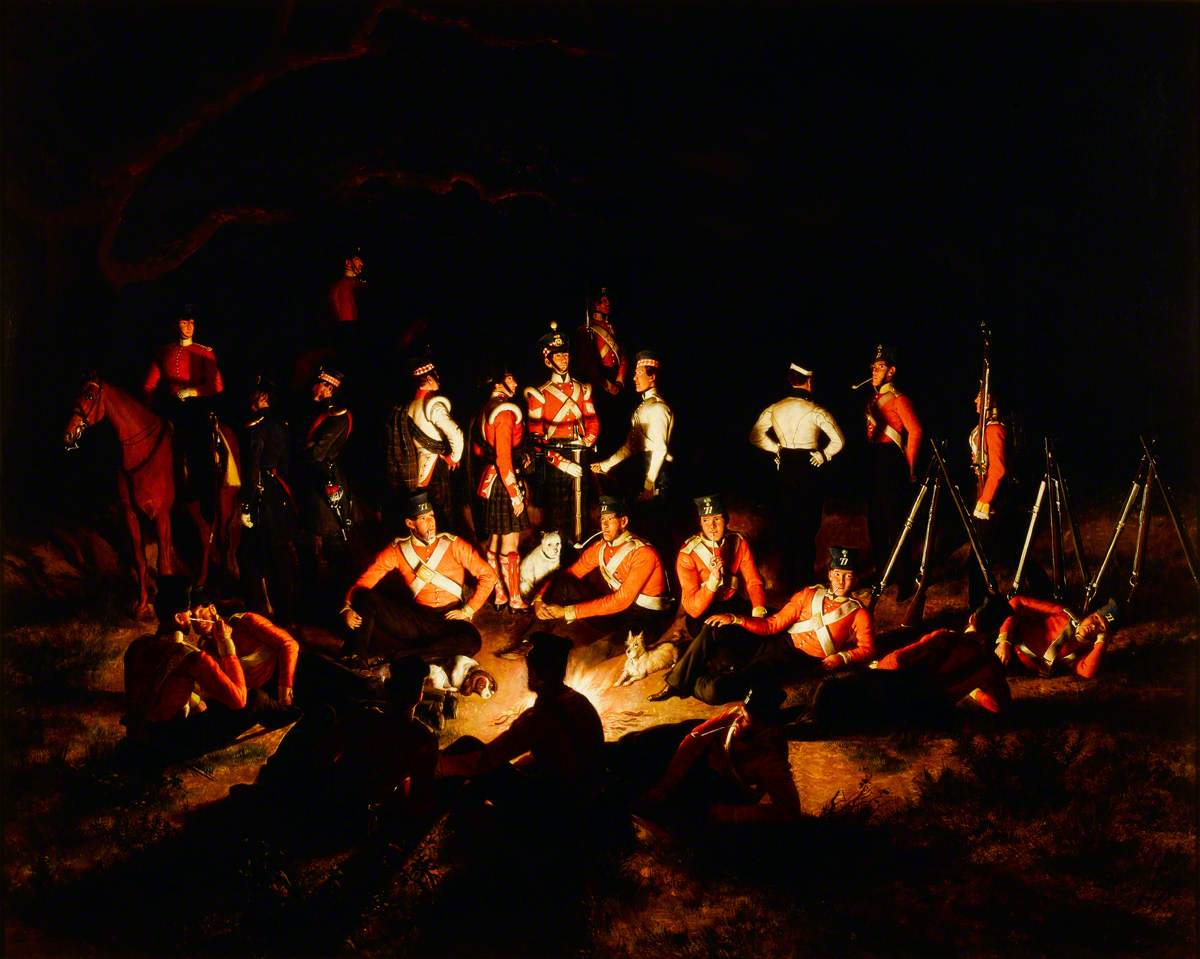
The Camp Fire, 1850

Daniel Cunliffe (1801–1871) was a British artist, best known for his painting of military subjects.

Cunliffe lived most of his life in Portsmouth.

His work is in the permanent collection of the National Galleries of Scotland, the National Army Museum, London, and the National War Museum, Edinburgh.
