= Clwyd (disambiguation) =

Clwyd is a preserved county of Wales and was a Welsh county (1974–1996).

Clwyd may also refer to:

== Places ==
- Clwyd (constituency), a Senedd electoral area since 2026
- River Clwyd (Welsh: Afon Clwyd)
  - Vale of Clwyd, its broad valley
- Clwydian Range (or Clwyds), a series of hills

== Organisations ==
- Clwyd County Council, 1974–1996
- Clwyd Football League, 1974–2011
- Clwyd Scout Area (The Scout Association)

== People ==
- Ann Clwyd (1937–2023), Welsh Labour politician
- Baron Clwyd, a title of nobility since 1919
  - John Herbert Roberts, 1st Baron Clwyd (1863–1955), Welsh Liberal politician
  - Trevor Roberts, 2nd Baron Clwyd (1900–1987), Welsh peer and barrister
- Hafina Clwyd (1936–2011), Welsh writer

== See also ==
- Dyffryn Clwyd, an administrative cantref, 1282–1536
- High Sheriff of Clwyd, an office since 1974
- Lord Lieutenant of Clwyd, an office since 1974
- Radio Clwyd, 1981–1993
- Theatr Clwyd (also Clwyd Theatr Cymru), an arts venue in Mold since 1976
- List of UK Parliament constituencies in Clwyd
