= Ruth Herbert Lewis =

English temperance movement activist (1871-1946)

Ruth Caine
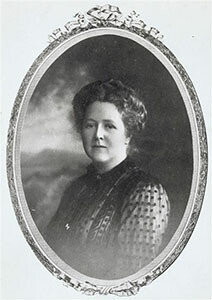
- Ruth Lewis, Lady Lewis by unknown photographer
- Born: 29 November 1871; Liverpool, England
- Died: 26 August 1946 (aged 74)
- Education: Newnham College, Cambridge; Trinity College Dublin
- Occupation: Temperance movement activist
- Spouse: John Herbert Lewis (m. 1897; died 1933)
- Children: 2
- Parents: William Sproston Caine (father); Alice Brown Caine (mother)
- Relatives: William Caine (brother); John Roberts (brother-in-law)

Ruth, Lady Herbert Lewis, OBE (née Caine; 29 November 1871 – 26 August 1946) was an English temperance movement activist of Manx descent and collector of Welsh folk songs. She published collections of Welsh folk songs, and was a key member of the Welsh Folk-Song Society in the first half of the 20th century.

== Early life and education ==
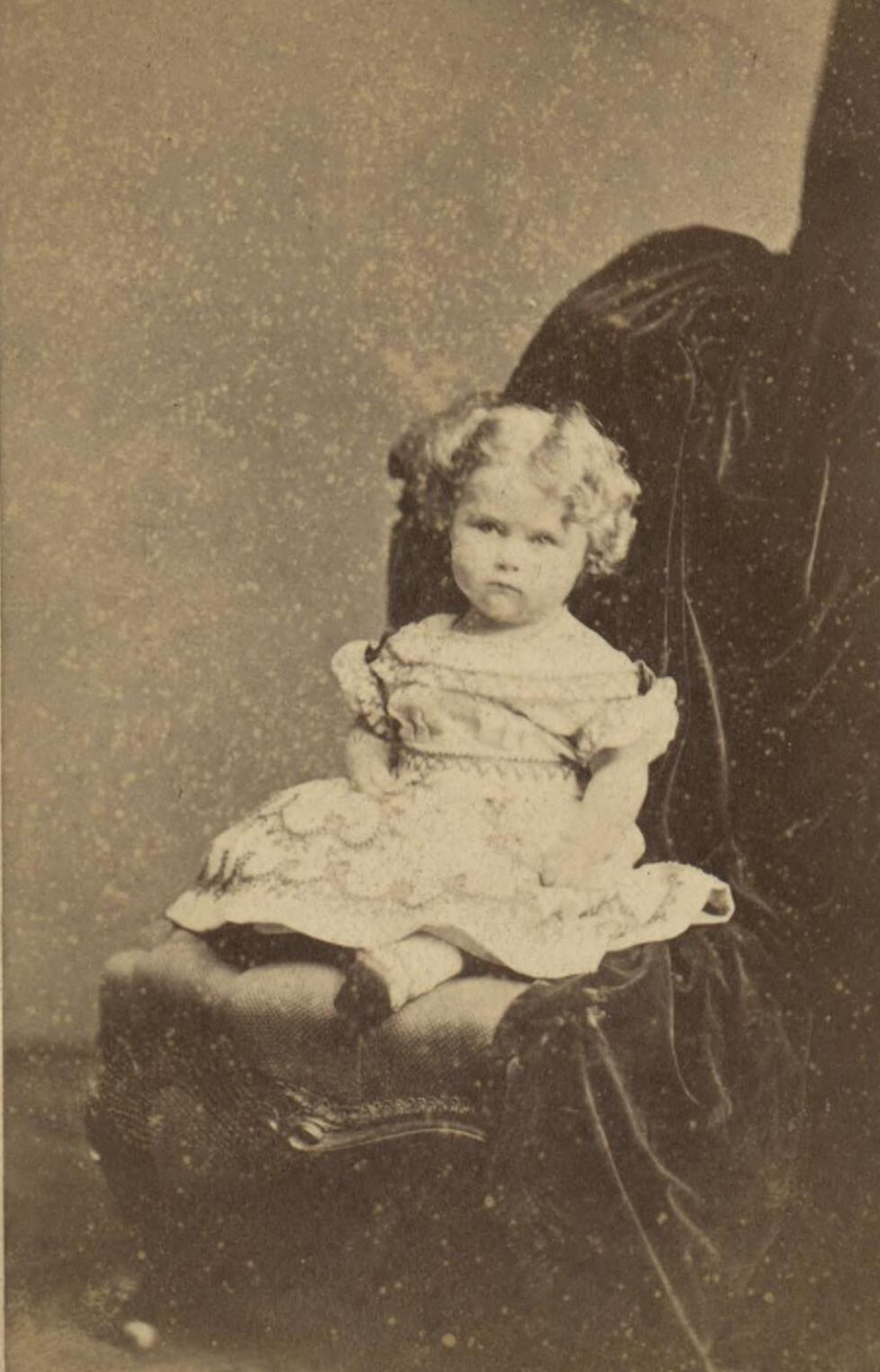
Portrait of Miss Caine

Ruth Caine was born in Liverpool, the daughter of William Sproston Caine and Alice Brown Caine. Her father was a Member of Parliament, and her maternal grandfather was Baptist minister Hugh Stowell Brown (1823–1886). She had two older sisters, Hannah (1869–1951) and Dorothea (1870–1953), and two brothers, David and William Caine (author). Ruth Caine attended Miss Mallison's School in Liverpool, then Clapham High School for Girls after her father was elected as an MP in 1880 and the family moved to London. She later attended Newnham College, Cambridge, between 1890–1893 but as Cambridge did not award degrees to women at the time, she was granted a master's degree in 1906 by Trinity College Dublin as one of the so-called Steamboat Ladies.

== Folk music ==
After she married John Herbert Lewis, a Welsh politician, she moved to Wales, learned to speak Welsh, and committed herself to learning Welsh culture. Her determination to assimilate into Welsh culture "o galon, er nad o waed"’ (‘at heart, if not by blood’) was met with respect, to the extent that at the 1912 National Eisteddfod of Wales she was welcomed into the Gorsedd of Bards under the Bardic name of Caerwen.

In 1906, she was one of the charter members of the Welsh Folk-Song Society (Cymdeithas Alawon Gwerin), and in 1930 she was elected to a term as president of the society. She and other Society members collected wax cylinder recordings of Welsh-language traditional songs, and published a journal of their findings, having been inspired by "all their wild beauty & pathos". Lewis used a portable Edison Gem phonograph to make the recordings and leading Welsh musicians such as Dora Herbert Jones and Morfydd Owen worked on the transcriptions of her recording.

Books authored by Ruth Herbert Lewis include Folk-Songs Collected in Flintshire and the Vale of Clwyd (1914) and Second Collection of Welsh Folk-Songs Collected by Lady Herbert Lewis (1934).

== Social reform ==
Ruth, Lady Herbert Lewis was active in the North Wales Women's Temperance Union. She also ran an all-night canteen for soldiers in Westminster during World War I. She received an OBE in 1918 for her work during the war about which she later declared "I had no option but to accept, as my name appeared without my knowledge or consent, it is rather nice to have something for what I have done not Herbert".

== Personal life and legacy ==
Ruth Caine married Sir John Herbert Lewis in 1897. They lived in Caerwys and in London, and had two children together, Kitty and Mostyn. Ruth was widowed in 1933, and died in 1946, age 74.

Her wax cylinder recordings survive in the archives at the St Fagan's National History Museum in Cardiff, National Museum Wales, and at the British Library. Other materials relating to Lady Herbert Lewis are at Bangor University, the National Library of Wales and Flintshire Record Office.

Both of her children, Kitty Idwal Jones and Dr. Herbert Mostyn Lewis, carried on her work and served terms as president of the Welsh Folk-Song Society. The National Eisteddfod has an annual "Lady Herbert Lewis Memorial Competition" for adult solo folk singers.
