= 1903 Camborne by-election =

UK parliamentary by-election

← 1900	8 April 1903	1906 →

Candidate	Lawson	Strauss
Party	Liberal	Liberal Unionist
Popular vote	3,558	2,869
Percentage	55.4%	44.6%
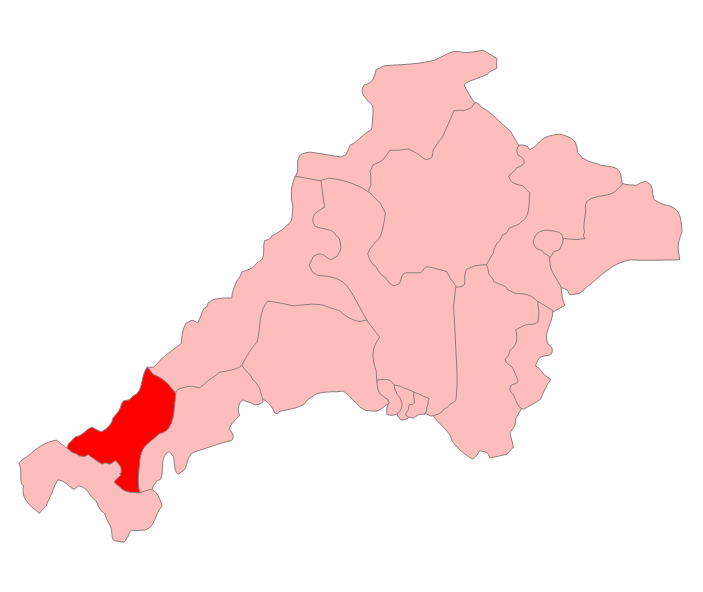
MP before election
William Sproston Caine
Liberal
Subsequent MP
Albert Dunn
Liberal

The 1903 Camborne by-election was a by-election held on 8 April 1903 for the British House of Commons constituency of Camborne in Cornwall.

The by-election was triggered by the death of the serving Liberal Party Member of Parliament (MP), William Sproston Caine. The Liberal victor, Wilfrid Lawson had previously been MP for Cockermouth and Carlisle and at 74 was the second oldest victor at a by-election.

The Liberal Association invited Lawson to stand for the by-election. They made the offer under peculiarly acceptable conditions, for should he secure the seat, he would be at liberty, when the next election occurred, to return, should he wish, to his old constituency at Cockermouth. Almost immediately after the Cornish electorate returned Lawson, the Cockermouth Liberal Association selected him to stand as their candidate at the next election. In parliament he continued to prosecute his anti-imperialist, Free Trade and temperance views while at home he began to campaign for the oncoming election. In January 1906 he returned with to Carlisle a majority of almost 600.

The Liberal Unionist candidate, Arthur Strauss, had been the Conservative MP for Camborne from 1895 to 1900, having previously stood in 1892 United Kingdom general election. He later joined the Labour Party.

== Result ==
Camborne by-election, 1903
Party	Candidate	Votes	%	±%
Liberal	Wilfrid Lawson	3,558	55.4	+4.5
Liberal Unionist	Arthur Strauss	2,869	44.6	−4.5
Majority		689	10.8	+9.0
Turnout		6,427	74.2	−1.8
Liberal hold		Swing	+4.5	
