= Mervyn Roberts =

Welsh composer (1906–1990)

William Henry Mervyn Roberts
- Born: 23 November 1906; Abergele, Denbighshire, Wales
- Died: 12 July 1990 (aged 83)
- Education: Trinity College, Cambridge; Royal College of Music
- Occupations: Musician & teacher
- Father: John Roberts
- Relatives: Trevor Roberts (brother); John Roberts (paternal grandfather); William Sproston Caine (maternal grandfather)

Mervyn Roberts (23 November 1906 – 12 July 1990), full name William Henry Mervyn Roberts, was a Welsh composer, best known for his piano music. Eiluned Davies regarded him as one of 'Y Pump Cymreig' (The Welsh Five) along with Denis ApIvor, Daniel Jones, Grace Williams and David Wynne, all born in the first two decades of the 20th Century.

== Career ==
Roberts was born into an aristocratic family in Abergele, Denbighshire - he was the second son of the first Lord Clwyd. His uncle was the amateur composer Osborne Roberts, who collaborated with William Caine on the comic opera The Island of Pharos (1904).

He studied English and history at Trinity College, Cambridge from 1925 until 1928, and then at the Royal College of Music with R. O. Morris, Gordon Jacob and Arthur Alexander. He was most successful as a composer during the 1940s and 1950s, when a number of his works were published. He was an occasional teacher, a contributor to music journals and during the war worked in the Civil Service. In 1947 he married the pianist Eileen Easom. From 1963-67 he taught piano at Christ's Hospital, Horsham.

== Music ==
His music, chromatic but basically tonal, is almost entirely for the keyboard and follows in the tradition of Arnold Bax and John Ireland. The piano works include the set of ten Variations on an Original Theme for two pianos (1932, revised 1942) and the Piano Sonata (1934, revised 1949), which won the Edwin Evans Prize in 1950 when first performed that year by Helen Perkin. It was the first Welsh piano sonata to be published (in 1951, by Novello). Other works for piano include the grouped large-scale movements Ballad (1950), Barcarolle (1969, rev, 1983) and Romance (1957), the Sonatina (1948), the Four Preludes (1949), and the shorter pieces Summer's Day and Wind of Autumn. He also wrote solo songs, part songs and chamber music.

=== Recordings ===
Christopher Williams has recorded the Sonata, the Four Preludes, the Sonatina and various shorter pieces. Some of the works for piano duo - A Christmas Prelude, Passacaglia, the Two Chorales for two pianos and the Elegy for two pianos - have been recorded by Bruce Posner and Donald Garvelmann.
