= Camborne (constituency) =

Former parliamentary constituency in the United Kingdom

- Former county constituency for the House of Commons
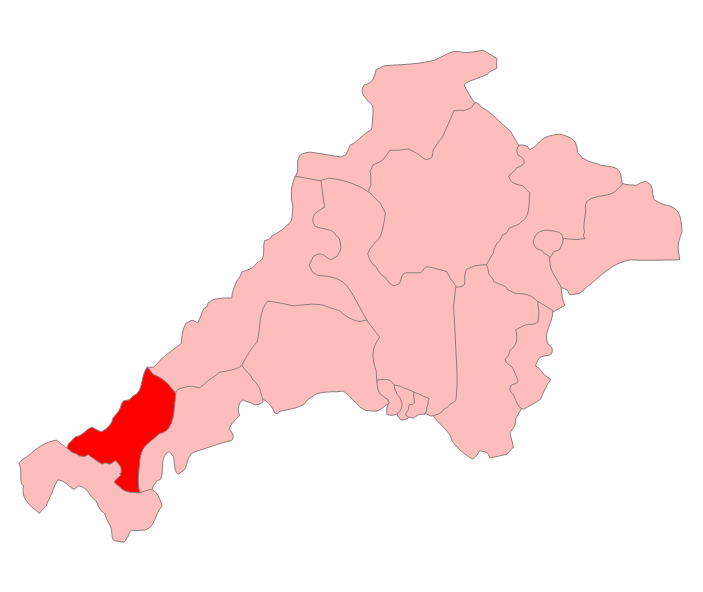
- Camborne in Cornwall and Devon, 1918–45

1885–1950
- Seats: One
- Created from: West Cornwall
- Replaced by: Falmouth and Camborne and St Ives

Camborne was a county constituency in Cornwall which returned one Member of Parliament to the House of Commons of the Parliament of the United Kingdom. It was created for the 1885 general election, and abolished for the 1950 general election, when it was largely replaced by the new Falmouth and Camborne.

Between 1885 and 1918 its official name was The North West or Camborne Division of Cornwall, and it was sometimes referred to simply as North West Cornwall.

== Boundaries ==
1885–1918: Part of the Sessional Division of Penwith East, and the civil parishes of Gwennap and St Agnes.

1918–1950: The Borough of Helston, the Urban Districts of Camborne, Hayle, Phillack, and Redruth, the Rural District of Redruth, in the Rural District of East Kerrier the parishes of Constantine, Mabe, and Perranarworthal, in the Rural District of Helston the parishes of Crowan and Wendron, and in the Rural District of Truro the parishes of Kea, Kenwyn Rural, Perranzabuloe, St Agnes, St Allen, and Tregavethan.

== Members of Parliament ==
Year	Member	Party
1885	Charles Conybeare	Liberal
1895	Arthur Strauss	Liberal Unionist
1900	William Sproston Caine	Liberal
1903 by-election	Sir Wilfrid Lawson	Liberal
1906	Albert Dunn	Liberal
1910	Francis Acland	Liberal
1922	Algernon Moreing	National Liberal
Nov 1923	Algernon Moreing	Liberal
Dec 1923	Leif Jones	Independent Liberal (sat with Liberal Party when elected)
Jan 1924	Leif Jones	Liberal
Oct 1924	Algernon Moreing	Constitutionalist
Nov 1924	Algernon Moreing	Unionist
1929	Leif Jones	Liberal
1931	Sir Peter Agnew	Conservative
1950	constituency abolished	

== Elections ==
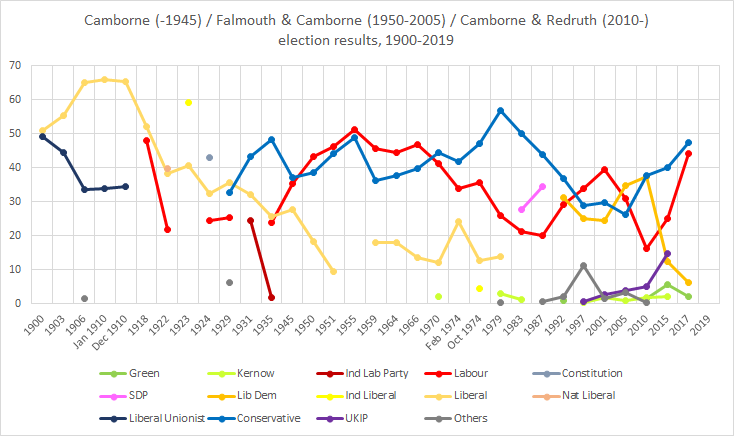
Camborne electoral history

=== Elections in the 1880s ===
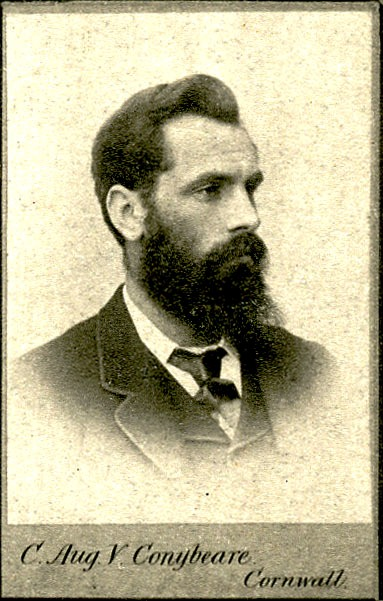
Charles Conybeare

General election 1885: Camborne
Party	Candidate	Votes	%
Independent Liberal	Charles Conybeare	2,926	53.2
Liberal	Arthur Vivian	2,577	46.8
Majority		349	6.4
Turnout		5,503	77.1
Registered electors		7,139	
Independent Liberal win (new seat)			

General election 1886: Camborne
Party	Candidate	Votes	%	±%
Liberal	Charles Conybeare	3,156	61.6	+14.8
Liberal Unionist	James Drew Gay	1,969	38.4	New
Majority		1,187	23.2	+16.8
Turnout		5,125	71.8	−5.3
Registered electors		7,139		
Liberal gain from Liberal		Swing		

=== Elections in the 1890s ===
General election 1892: Camborne
Party	Candidate	Votes	%	±%
Liberal	Charles Conybeare	3,073	53.8	−7.8
Liberal Unionist	Arthur Strauss	2,635	46.2	+7.8
Majority		438	7.6	−15.6
Turnout		5,708	75.0	+3.2
Registered electors		7,611		
Liberal hold		Swing	-7.8	

Arthur Strauss

General election 1895: Camborne
Party	Candidate	Votes	%	±%
Liberal Unionist	Arthur Strauss	3,166	53.9	+7.7
Liberal	Charles Conybeare	2,704	46.1	−7.7
Majority		462	7.8	N/A
Turnout		5,870	75.3	+0.3
Registered electors		7,800		
Liberal Unionist gain from Liberal		Swing	+7.7	

=== Elections in the 1900s ===
General election 1900: Camborne
Party	Candidate	Votes	%	±%
Liberal	William Sproston Caine	3,101	50.9	+4.8
Liberal Unionist	Arthur Strauss	2,993	49.1	−4.8
Majority		108	1.8	N/A
Turnout		6,094	76.0	+0.7
Registered electors		8,023		
Liberal gain from Liberal Unionist		Swing	+4.8	

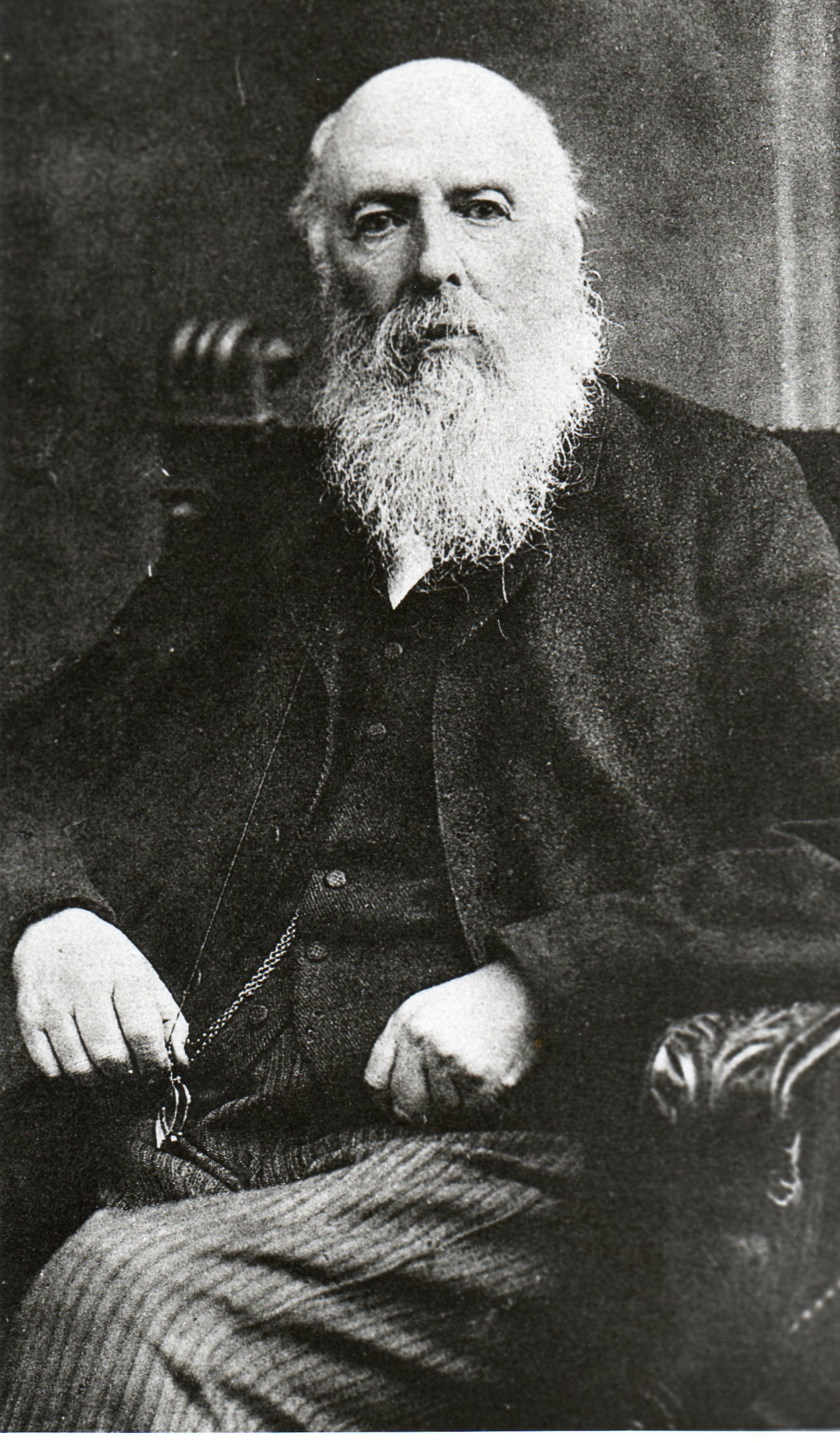
Lawson

1903 Camborne by-election
Party	Candidate	Votes	%	±%
Liberal	Wilfrid Lawson	3,558	55.4	+4.5
Liberal Unionist	Arthur Strauss	2,869	44.6	−4.5
Majority		689	10.8	+9.0
Turnout		6,427	74.2	−1.8
Registered electors		8,659		
Liberal hold		Swing	+4.5	

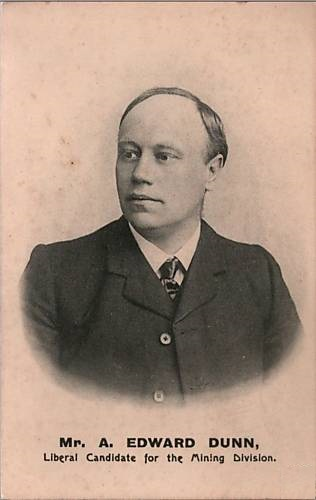
Edward Dunn

General election 1906: Camborne
Party	Candidate	Votes	%	±%
Liberal	Albert Dunn	4,614	65.0	+14.1
Conservative	Thomas Hewitt	2,384	33.5	−15.6
Social Democratic Federation	Jack Jones	109	1.5	New
Majority		2,230	31.5	+29.7
Turnout		7,107	77.2	+1.2
Registered electors		9,210		
Liberal hold		Swing	+14.9	

=== Elections in the 1910s ===
General election January 1910: Camborne
Party	Candidate	Votes	%	±%
Liberal	Albert Dunn	5,027	66.0	+1.0
Liberal Unionist	Norman G Chamberlain	2,587	34.0	+0.5
Majority		2,440	32.0	+0.5
Turnout		7,614	81.2	+4.0
Liberal hold		Swing	+0.5	

General election December 1910: Camborne
Party	Candidate	Votes	%	±%
Liberal	Francis Dyke Acland	4,419	65.5	−0.5
Liberal Unionist	George Coates	2,326	34.5	+0.5
Majority		2,093	31.0	−1.0
Turnout		6,745	71.9	−1.3
Liberal hold		Swing	-0.5	

General Election 1914–15:

Another General Election was required to take place before the end of 1915. The political parties had been making preparations for an election to take place and by July 1914, the following candidates had been selected;

- Liberal: Francis Dyke Acland
- Unionist:

Francis Acland

General election 1918: Camborne
Party	Candidate	Votes	%	±%
Liberal	Francis Dyke Acland	7,078	52.0	−13.5
Labour	George Nicholls	6,546	48.0	New
Majority		532	4.0	−27.0
Turnout		13,624	41.8	−30.1
Liberal hold		Swing		

- No Coupon was issued

=== Elections in the 1920s ===
General election 1922: Camborne
Party	Candidate	Votes	%	±%
National Liberal	Algernon Moreing	8,191	39.7	N/A
Liberal	Leifchild Jones	7,923	38.4	−13.6
Labour	Tom Proctor	4,512	21.9	−26.1
Majority		268	1.3	N/A
Turnout		20,626	60.5	+18.7
National Liberal gain from Liberal		Swing		

General election 1923: Camborne
Party	Candidate	Votes	%	±%
Independent Liberal	Leifchild Jones	11,794	59.3	+20.9
Liberal	Algernon Moreing	8,096	40.7	+1.0
Majority		3,698	18.6	N/A
Turnout		19,890	58.0	−2.5
Independent Liberal gain from Liberal		Swing	+10.0	

- The local Liberal Association was unable to agree on a candidate, but Moreing was recognised as the official candidate by Liberal Party HQ.

General election 1924: Camborne
Party	Candidate	Votes	%	±%
Constitutionalist (Unionist)	Algernon Moreing	9,530	42.9	+2.2
Liberal	Leifchild Jones	7,220	32.5	–8.2
Labour	F. A. P. Rowe	5,477	24.6	New
Majority		2,310	10.4	N/A
Turnout		22,227	64.6	+6.6
Constitutionalist gain from Liberal		Swing		

General election 1929: Camborne
Party	Candidate	Votes	%	±%
Liberal	Leifchild Jones	11,176	35.8	+3.3
Unionist	Algernon Moreing	10,145	32.6	−10.3
Labour	H J Sharman	7,870	25.3	+0.7
Independent	J C Roberts	1,976	6.3	New
Majority		1,031	3.2	N/A
Turnout		31,167	70.8	+6.2
Liberal gain from Unionist		Swing	+6.8	

=== Elections in the 1930s ===
General election 1931: Camborne
Party	Candidate	Votes	%	±%
Conservative	Peter Agnew	14,664	43.4	+10.8
Liberal	Leifchild Jones	10,840	32.1	−3.7
Ind. Labour Party	Kate Spurrell	8,280	24.5	New
Majority		3,824	11.3	N/A
Turnout		33,784	75.8	+5.0
Conservative gain from Liberal		Swing		

General election 1935: Camborne
Party	Candidate	Votes	%	±%
Conservative	Peter Agnew	14,826	48.3	+4.9
Liberal	Walter Peacock	7,921	25.8	−6.3
Labour	Harold R. G. Greaves	7,375	24.0	New
Ind. Labour Party	Kate Spurrell	592	1.9	−22.6
Majority		6,905	22.5	+11.2
Turnout		30,714	66.9	−8.9
Conservative hold		Swing		

=== Elections in the 1940s ===
General Election 1939–40: Another General Election was required to take place before the end of 1940. The political parties had been making preparations for an election to take place from 1939 and by the end of this year, the following candidates had been selected;

- Conservative: Peter Agnew
- Liberal:
- Labour: J J H Moses

General election 1945: Camborne
Party	Candidate	Votes	%	±%
Conservative	Peter Agnew	12,257	37.1	−11.2
Labour	Harold Hayman	11,673	35.3	+11.3
Liberal	Thomas Rowland Hill	9,141	27.6	+1.8
Majority		584	1.8	−20.7
Turnout		33,071	64.3	−2.6
Conservative hold		Swing		

== See also ==
- Camborne and Redruth (UK Parliament constituency)
- Falmouth and Camborne (UK Parliament constituency)
