= Lothian Prize Essay =

The Marquis of Lothian's Historical Prize Essay was a prize for historical studies at the University of Oxford. It was established in 1870, when William Schomberg Robert Kerr, 8th Marquis of Lothian died without leaving issue. He bequeathed a fund to encourage the study of Modern History at Oxford, to be awarded annually.

In 1939, the Prize was £40 or books of the same value. It was defined as “an essay on some aspect of foreign history, secular or ecclesiastical, in the period between the dethronement of Romulus Augustulus and the death of Frederick the Great.” The prize was open to members of the University who had not exceeded twenty-one terms from Matriculation.

The Prize was eventually (by 1989) replaced by the Marquis of Lothian's Studentship in Modern History.

== Published Prize essays ==
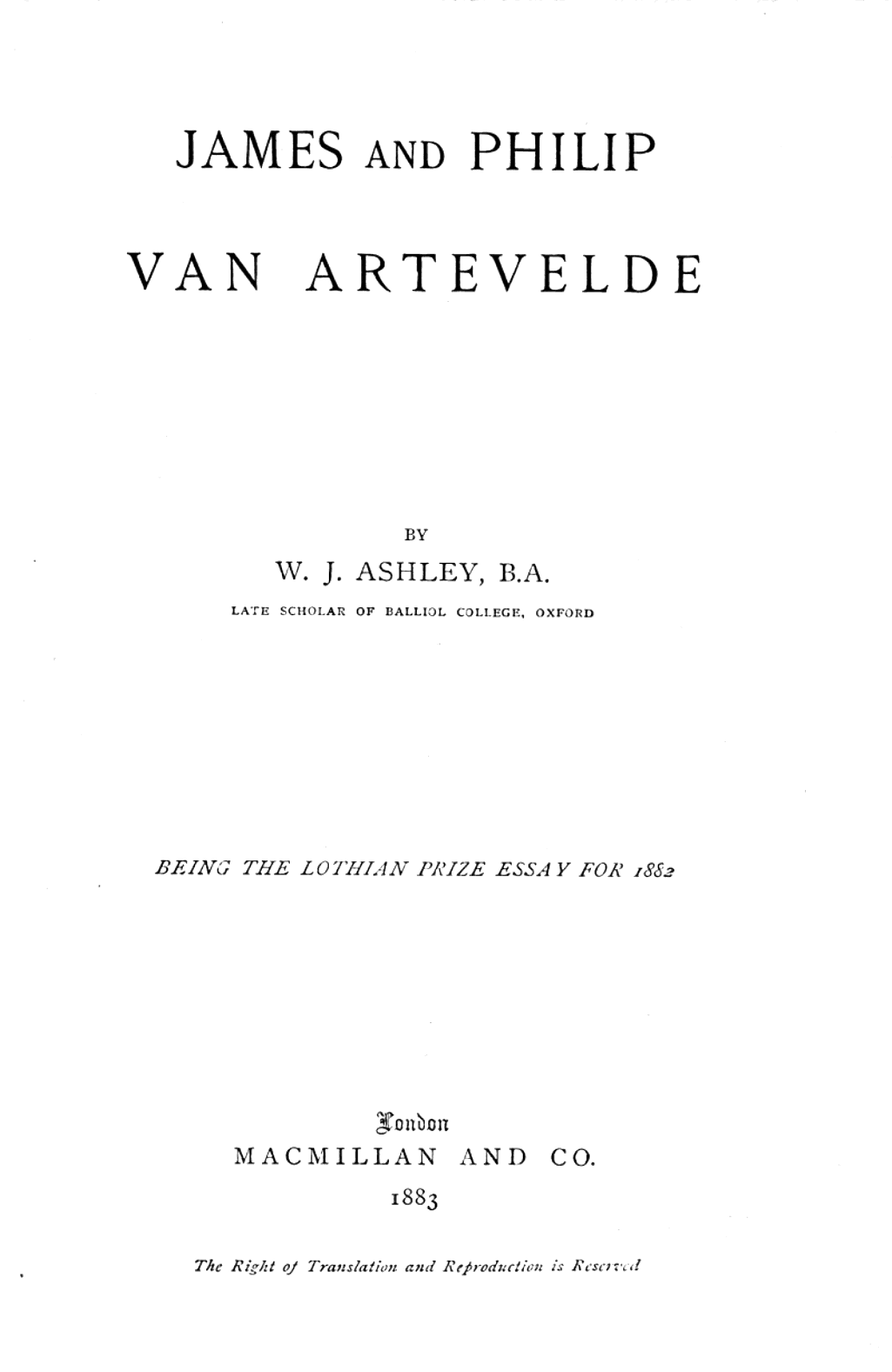
Title page of the 1882 Lothian Prize Essay

- 1873 Thomas Raleigh, The University of Paris from its Foundation to the Council of Constance (Oxford, 1873).
- 1874 Arthur Lionel Smith, Erasmus (Oxford: Shrimpton, 1874).
- 1877 Charles Augustus Vansittart Conybeare, The Place of Iceland in the History of European Institutions (Oxford: J. Parker, 1877.
- 1880 Arthur Henry Hardinge, Queen Christina of Sweden (Oxford:Shrimpton, 1880).
- 1881 Edward Henry Ralph Tatham, John Sobieski (Oxford: Shrimpton, 1881).
- 1882 William James Ashley, James and Philip van Artevelde (London: Macmillan, 1883).
- 1883 George Nathaniel Curzon, Justinian, (Oxford, 1883).
- 1884 Charles Oman, The Art of War in the Middle Ages, AD 378–1515 (Oxford: Blackwells: London: T. Fisher. Unwin, 1885).
- 1885 Edwin Cannan, The Duke of Saint Simon (Oxford: B.H. Blackwell, 1885).
- 1889 Charles Raymond Beazley James the First of Aragon (1890)
- 1892 Albert Frederick Pollard, The Jesuits in Poland (1892)
- 1898 Christopher Thomas Atkinson, Michel de l'Hospital (London: Longman, Green, 1900).
- 1903 William Nassau Weech, Urban VIII (London: 1905).
- 1907 John Duncan Mackie Pope Adrian IV (1907)
- 1924 Gerald Groveland Walsh SJ, The Emperor Charles IV, 1316-1378: A Study in Holy Roman Imperialism (1924)
