= George Calderon =

English writer (1868–1915)

George Leslie Calderon
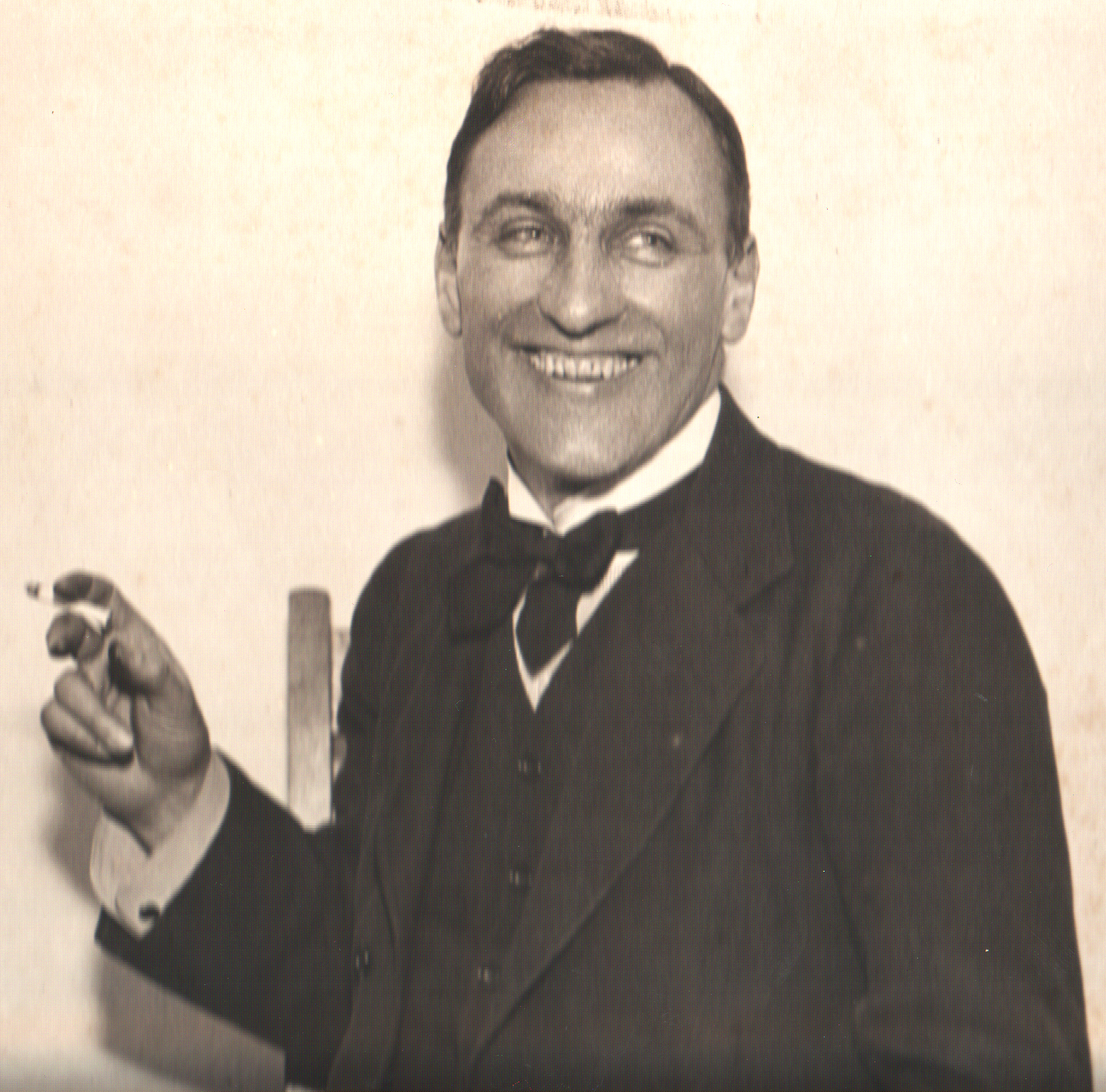
- Born: 2 December 1868; London, England
- Died: 4 June 1915 (aged 46); Gallipoli
- Occupation: Writer
- Genre: Plays, translations
- Relatives: Philip Hermogenes Calderon (father); William Frank Calderon (brother)

George Leslie Calderon (2 December 1868 – 4 June 1915) was an English writer. He was one of the most knowledgeable Englishmen of his generation about Russian life and literature.

== Life ==
Calderon was born in St John's Wood, the fifth son of the Victorian painter Philip Hermogenes Calderon, and educated at Rugby and Trinity College, Oxford, before training as a barrister. From 1895 to 1897 he worked in Russia as a teacher, journalist and scholar, then returned to England, learned several other Slavonic languages and in 1900 became an assistant librarian at the British Museum. During this time he pursued his research into Slavonic folklore, married, and published many stories, articles and translations. In 1903, Calderon left the British Museum to become a full-time writer. In 1906 he lived for two months on Tahiti. On his return, he regularly reviewed for the Times Literary Supplement.

Calderon was the first person to translate into English and successfully direct a full-length play by Anton Chekhov (The Seagull, at Glasgow in 1909). He also published notable translations of Chekhov and Ilya Tolstoy, and wrote several ballet libretti for Michel Fokine.

Between 1908 and 1910 Calderon worked closely with leaders of the Women's National Anti-Suffrage League. His plays The Fountain, The Little Stone House and Revolt were performed all over Britain between 1909 and 1913.

In 1914 Calderon succeeded in enlisting in the British army at the age of 45, seeing action in Flanders. He was killed at Gallipoli on 4 June 1915.

The book Tahiti was posthumously published in 1921, to great acclaim, and in 1925 a production in London of Calderon's translation of The Cherry Orchard established Chekhov as a new force in the English theatre.

== Works ==
- The Adventures of Downy V. Green, Rhodes Scholar at Oxford (1902, novel)
- Dwala: A Romance (1904, novel)
- Woman in Relation to the State: A Consideration of the Arguments Advanced for the Extension of the Parliamentary Suffrage to Women (1908, political essay)
- The Organisation of Buying: A Policy for Women (1911, political essay)
- The Fountain: A Comedy in Three Acts (1911, play)
- Two Plays by Tchekhof: ‘The Seagull’, ‘The Cherry Orchard’ (1912, translations)
- Thompson: A Comedy in Three Acts (1913, play, written with St John Hankin)
- The Little Stone House: A Play in One Act (1913, play)
- The Maharani of Arakan: A Romantic Comedy (1915, play)
- Tahiti (1921, travelogue)
- Three Plays and a Pantomime (1922, plays)
- Eight One-Act Plays (1922, plays)
- The Brave Little Tailor, or Seven at a Blow (1923, adaptation of The Valiant Little Tailor, with William Caine)
- Two plays by Anton Chekhov, 'The Seagull' and 'The Cherry Orchard', and one by Alfred de Musset, 'Perdican and Camille' ('On ne badine pas avec l'amour') (1924)
- The Two Talismans: A Comedy in One Act (1928, play)
