= Richard Steble =

Liberal Party politician

Richard Fell Steble MP

Member of Parliament for Scarborough
- In office 5 November 1884 – 27 November 1885 Serving with William Sproston Caine
- Preceded by: William Sproston Caine; John George Dodson
- Succeeded by: George Sitwell

Personal details
- Born: 1825
- Died: 8 October 1899 (aged 74)
- Party: Liberal

Lieutenant-Colonel Richard Fell Steble (1825 – 8 October 1899) was a Liberal Party politician.

Steble was elected MP for Scarborough at a by-election in 1884, but did not stand for re-election when the seat was reduced to one member in 1885.

Parliament of the United Kingdom
Preceded by William Sproston Caine; John George Dodson	Member of Parliament for Scarborough; 1884–1885; With: William Sproston Caine	Succeeded by George Sitwell
