= Florence Annie Conybeare =

Florence Annie Conybeare (13 September 1872 – 29 February 1916) was a British campaigner for the Women's Suffrage movement. She was a fundraiser and Voluntary Aid Detachment (VAD) worker during the First World War, and an active member of the Women's Liberal Federation.

== Birth ==
Conybeare was born Florence Annie Strauss on 13 September 1872 in Brixton, London. She was the eldest daughter of Gustave Strauss, (Note: Born 'Gustavus'.) a German-speaking Bohemian glass merchant and inventor, from Gablonz, North Bohemia, a town known for glass production, who became a naturalised British subject. Her mother, Frances Lehmaier, was born in New York.

== Marriage ==
On 15 October 1896 she married the 43-year-old bachelor, former Liberal MP for Camborne, Cornwall, and practising barrister, Charles Augustus Vansittart Conybeare. The marriage was conducted in the Theistic Church and officiated by Charles Voysey, a freethinking Yorkshire vicar who was deposed for publishing heretical sermons and for denying the doctrine of everlasting hell.

The Conybeares lived in Cheyne Walk, Chelsea, close to another Women's Rights campaigner, Sylvia Pankhurst, before moving in 1891 to Tregullow House, Scorrier, Cornwall, a country pile owned by John Williams the 5th, a direct descendant of the Williams mining-moguls' dynasty. She remained in Cornwall until at least 1902. The couple later moved to Oakfield Park in Dartford, Kent.

== Women's suffrage ==
=== 1907: Women's Enfranchisement Bill ===
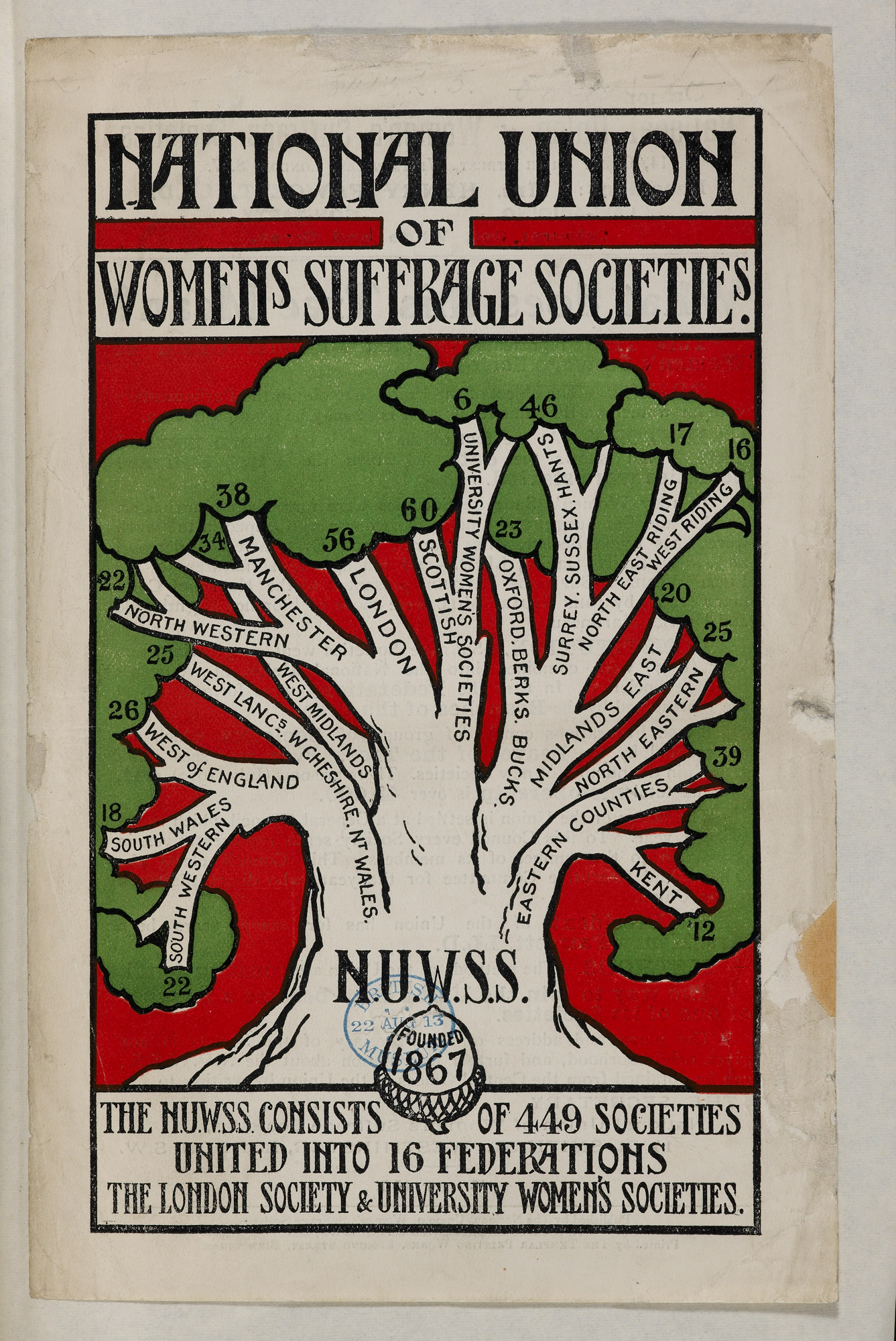
NUWSS poster

Conybeare was an active organiser, supporter and voice within the Women's Suffrage movement. She had supported Mr. W.H. Dickenson's (Note: Liberal MP for St Pancras.) bill which received its first reading on 8 March 1907. Up to then married women living in the same house were not regarded as 'joint owners' of that property by law. The Dickenson Bill proposed that husband and wife living under the same roof should both be considered as 'joint occupiers' of the property which, as a consequence, would give married women equal status with men and the right to vote.

=== 1908: Women's Suffrage: A Liberal Principle ===
In her ‘treatise’ Some Objections Answered published in 1908, in which she claimed that "Women’s Suffrage is essentially a Liberal principle", Conybeare wrote a reply to an article written by Edith Calkin, one of the women critics of Women's Suffrage. She rebuked Calkin for wanting to deny women political recognition and argued why women should be given the right to vote, and aired her objections to Edith Calkin's approach to women's rights.

The inequities of legislation

- Conybeare referred to Mr Dickenson's 'Women's Suffrage Bill of 1907' [ed. Women’s Enfranchisement Bill], which, if passed, would treat married women as 'joint occupier' of a dwelling, and chided Calkin for ignoring recent legislative developments concerning Women's Suffrage.
- Conybeare believed that all women should be eligible to vote, irrespective of any 'property qualification'.
- It was not right that women who paid rates and taxes had no right to decide how money is spent; taxation and representation belonged together.
- The Married Women's Property Act 1882, she wrote, was "very unsatisfactory for women", especially given the fact that married woman typically ran 16-hour days multitasking for their husbands, and any savings a woman made while running a home were the property of her husband.
- The Law of Divorce "treated men and women differently, making it far easier for a husband to divorce his wife than for a wife to rid herself of a bad husband".
- She objected to married women being barred from voting in municipal elections.
- Women should be allowed to vote so they can help run the country, and pointed to the "very active part" women have played in the country's political life, and said that the last General Election [ed. 1906] "had been fought as much by men as women", thanks to the Women's Liberal Associations and the Primrose League, whose work had been used by all the political parties.

The plight of working women

- Conybeare rebukes Calkin's claim that women's place is in the home, and for failing to address the issue of women's pay.
- Conybeare defined 'sweated labour' as "a woman who is paid less than a man for the same work".
- While highlighting the drudgery of working women, Conybeare asserted that "women of leisure have a duty to fight for the rights of the working woman".
- She urged working women to unite and lobby for Women's Suffrage because it was not only for their own good, but also because it would "raise the status of working women", especially as "the status of the poorest class of male worker had vastly improved" once he had been granted the right to vote in 1884".

=== 1913: Suffragist meeting at Dartford ===
On 24 July 1913, a meeting of the National Union of Women's Suffrage Societies was held in a meadow in Bullace Lane where the Australian suffragist, Muriel Matters, had been invited to address a gathering on the subject of votes for women. Conybeare organised and presided over the event. Her introduction made it clear that they were not militant suffragists, and that they sought to make changes by argument rather than by force.

Speech: Australian versus British suffragism

Matters, who had been sentenced to a month in Holloway Prison for obstruction, having earlier chained herself to a grille in the House of Commons, arrived by car with her entourage, as part of a publicity tour around the area, termed a 'pilgrimage'. In her speech, she contrasted the situation in this country with that in Australia where women already had the vote [ed. in 1902, see Women's suffrage in Australia], saying that women in Britain were being treated in the same way as criminals, foreigners and lunatics, despite having to pay taxes.

At the end of the speech, Conybeare invited Councillor W. H. D. King to give the vote of thanks. He said that he felt ashamed that he had the vote while they did not, but thanked the party for recognising Dartford as a place of importance worth visiting.

== Civic work ==
Conybeare worked in Voluntary Aid Detachment at Charing Cross Hospital, London.

She raised money in Dartford during the First World War for an ambulance.

She was president of the Dartford Women's Liberal Association, and had largely been responsible for the setting up and running of the Babies Club.

== Death ==
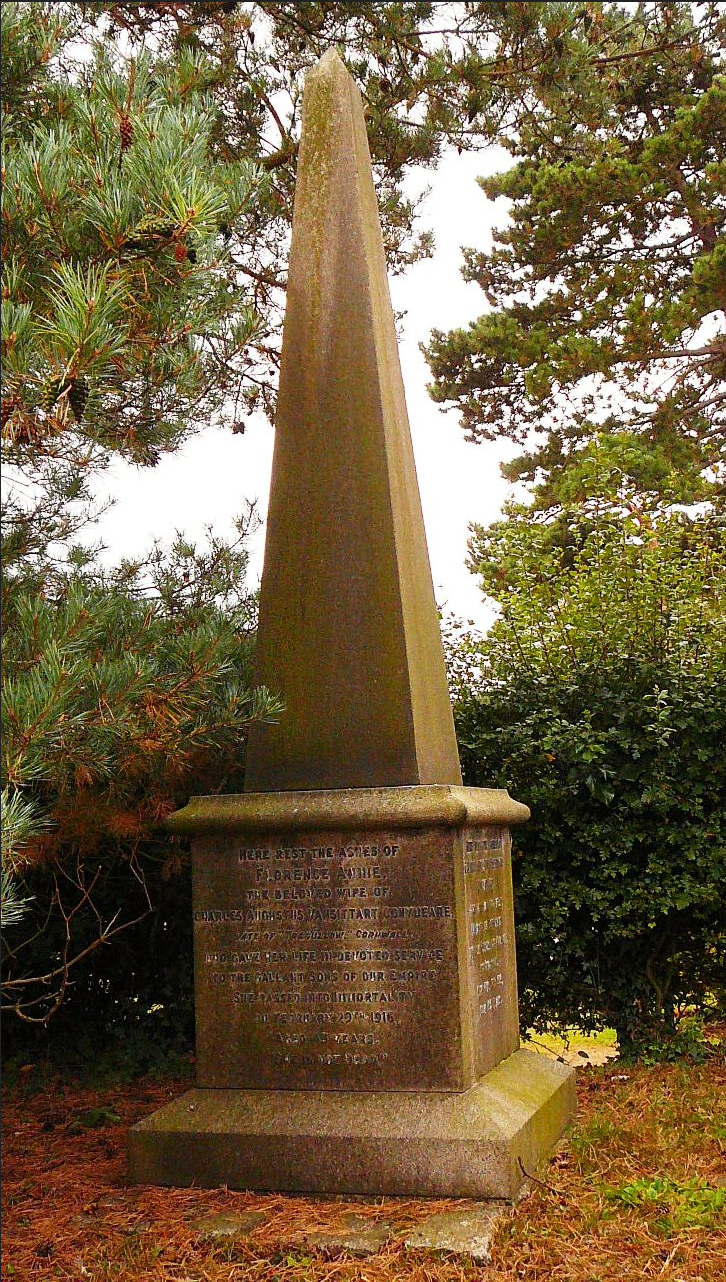
Conybeare's memorial

Conybeare died at her father's home in Kensington, London, on 29 February 1916, aged 43, after 18 months of failing health, while her husband, Charles Conybeare, was at Canterbury.
