= William Frank Calderon =

British artist (1865–1943)

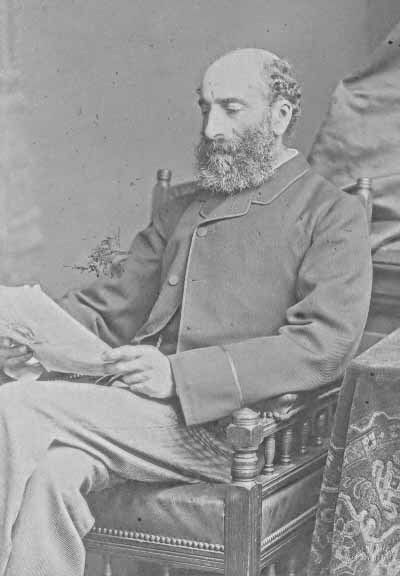
- Born: 1865; London, England
- Died: 21 April 1943 (aged 77–78)
- Occupation: Painter
- Relatives: Philip Hermogenes Calderon (father); George Calderon (brother)

William Frank Calderon aka W. Frank Calderon (London 1865 – 21 April 1943), was a British painter of portraits, landscapes, figure subjects and sporting pictures. He was the third son of the painter and Keeper of the Royal Academy in London, Philip Hermogenes Calderon and was married (in 1892) to Ethel Wells Armstead (b. 1864), third daughter of the noted sculptor Henry Hugh Armstead, RA.

When fourteen, Calderon was awarded the Trevelyan Goodall Scholarship and later a scholarship to the Slade School under Professor Alphonse Legros. He and Charles Edward Johnson, a landscape artist, started the School of Animal Painting at 54 Baker Street, London in April 1895; Calderon acted as principal until 1916. Some of their students were Cecil Aldin, Lionel Edwards, Alfred Munnings, Lady Helena Gleichen, Frederic Whiting and George E. Studdy. He exhibited at the Royal Academy from 1881–1921, and had his first Royal Academy painting bought by Queen Victoria. His 1936 book Animal Painting and Anatomy is still considered a useful reference source. He illustrated numerous books such as "The Most Delectable History of Reynard The Fox" edited by Joseph Jacobs and published by Macmillan in 1895. The cover, designed by A. A. Turbayne, was gold-blocked in Art Nouveau style and inspired designers to create work using "asymmetrical designs, sinuous curves, and simplified shapes with minimal shading."

== Gallery ==
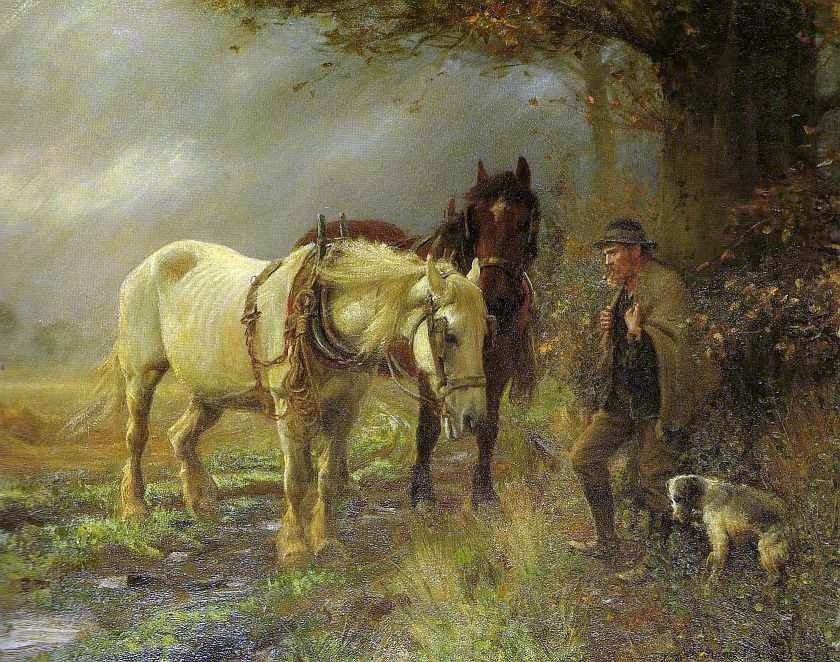

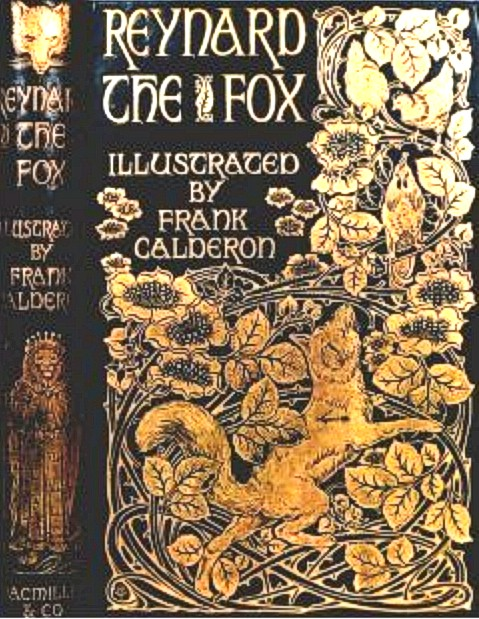
