= Alice Caine =

English temperance movement activist (1849-1918)

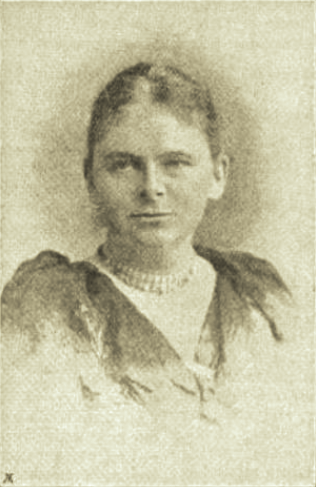
- Born: Alice Brown; 21 February 1849; Liverpool, England
- Died: 28 January 1918 (aged 68); London
- Other name: Mrs. W. S. Caine
- Occupation: temperance leader
- Spouse: William Sproston Caine (m. 1868; died 1903)
- Children: 5
- Parents: Hugh Stowell Brown (father); Alice Chibnal Sirett (mother)
- Relatives: Ruth Caine (daughter); William Caine (son); John Herbert Roberts and John Herbert Lewis (sons-in-law)

Alice Caine (née Brown; also known as Mrs. W. S. Caine; 21 February 1849 – 28 January 1918) was an English temperance leader. She served as president of the Women's Total Abstinence Union, the Liverpool Ladies' Temperance Association, and the Deaconesses' National Total Abstinence League.

== Early life and education ==
Alice Brown was born in Liverpool, England, 21 February 1849. A daughter of Alice Chibnal Brown (nee Sirett; 1821-1863) and the Baptist preacher, the Rev. Hugh Stowell Brown (1823-1886), she developed a sympathy with the temperance movement. Caine had six younger siblings, Robert, Hugh, John, Dora, Bertha, and Eleanor. Her father's second wife was her sister in law, Phoebe Caine (d. 1884).

She was educated privately in Liverpool.

== Career ==
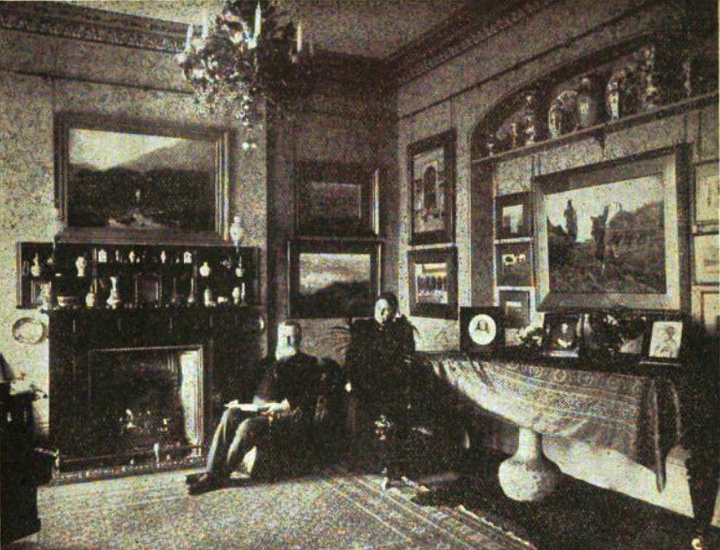
William and Alice Caine at home (1898)

In 1868, she married William Sproston Caine, a prominent iron merchant and active temperance leader, and afterward Member of Parliament.

Caine was introduced and spoke briefly at the Third Biennial Convention and Executive Committee Meetings of the World's Woman's Christian Temperance Union in London in June 1895, where she represented the Girls' Guild of Good Life.

She was affiliated with a number of temperance organizations, becoming president of the Women's Total Abstinence Union, and also of the Auxiliary of the Free Church Council. Caine was also an active member of the Committee of the Young Abstainers' Union, besides holding membership and official relations in various other subordinate organizations. Caine served as president of Deaconesses' National Total Abstinence League, federated to the Women's Total Abstinence Union. One of her most responsible positions was that of treasurer of the Anglo-Indian Temperance Association, of which her husband was the founder and she assumed that additional office after his death in 1903.

== Personal life ==
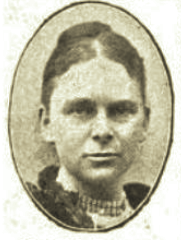
(1898)

Mr. and Mrs. Caine had five children:

- Hannah Caine Roberts, who married John Herbert Roberts, M.P., Denbighshire
- Dorothea ("Dora") Caine, M.D., Medical Officer, Victoria Hospital for Children, Hull; honorary appointments in connection with the Royal Free Hospital and the New Hospital for Women, London
- Ruth Herbert Lewis, English temperance activist and collector of Welsh folk songs, who married John Herbert Lewis, M.P., Flintshire
- William Caine, author
- David Caine

Alice Brown Caine died in London, 28 January 1918. A memorial service was held in her honour at Wheatsheaf Hall on 10 February 1918.
