= West Denbighshire =

UK Parliament constituency (1885–1918)

- Former county constituency for the House of Commons

1885–1918
- Seats: one
- Created from: Denbighshire
- Replaced by: Denbigh

West Denbighshire, formally called the Western Division of Denbighshire, was a county constituency in Denbighshire, in North Wales. It returned one Member of Parliament (MP) to the House of Commons of the Parliament of the United Kingdom, elected by the first past the post voting system.

== History ==
The constituency was created by the Redistribution of Seats Act 1885 for the 1885 general election, when the two-member Denbighshire constituency was divided into and Eastern and Western divisions. It was abolished for the 1918 general election.

== Members of Parliament ==
Election	Member	Party
1885	William Cornwallis-West	Liberal
1886	William Cornwallis-West	Liberal Unionist
1892	Sir John Roberts	Liberal
1918	constituency abolished	

== Elections ==
=== Elections in the 1880s ===
General election 1885: West Denbighshire
Party	Candidate	Votes	%	±%
Liberal	William Cornwallis-West	4,586	60.5	
Conservative	Charles Salusbury Mainwaring	2,992	39.5	
Majority		1,594	21.0	
Turnout		7,578	85.2	
Registered electors		8,899		
Liberal win (new seat)				

General election 1886: West Denbighshire
Party	Candidate	Votes	%	±%
Liberal Unionist	William Cornwallis-West	Unopposed		
Liberal Unionist gain from Liberal				

=== Elections in the 1890s ===
Herbert Roberts

General election 1892: West Denbighshire
Party	Candidate	Votes	%	±%
Liberal	John Roberts	4,612	66.9	New
Liberal Unionist	William Cornwallis West	2,279	33.1	N/A
Majority		2,333	33.8	N/A
Turnout		6,891	69.5	N/A
Registered electors		9,915		
Liberal gain from Liberal Unionist		Swing	N/A	

General election 1895: West Denbighshire
Party	Candidate	Votes	%	±%
Liberal	John Roberts	4,481	60.9	−6.0
Conservative	Thomas Alured Wynne-Edwards	2,878	39.1	+6.0
Majority		1,603	21.8	−12.0
Turnout		7,359	82.3	+12.8
Registered electors		8,941		
Liberal hold		Swing	−6.0	

=== Elections in the 1900s ===
General election 1900: West Denbighshire
Party	Candidate	Votes	%	±%
Liberal	John Roberts	Unopposed		
Liberal hold				

Herbert Roberts

General election 1906: West Denbighshire
Party	Candidate	Votes	%	±%
Liberal	John Roberts	Unopposed		
Liberal hold				

=== Elections in the 1910s ===
General election January 1910: West Denbighshire
Party	Candidate	Votes	%	±%
Liberal	John Roberts	5,854	67.4	N/A
Conservative	Samuel Thompson	2,829	32.6	New
Majority		3,025	34.8	N/A
Turnout		8,683	87.5	N/A
Registered electors		9,920		
Liberal hold		Swing	N/A	

General election December 1910: West Denbighshire
Party	Candidate	Votes	%	±%
Liberal	John Roberts	Unopposed		
Liberal hold				

General Election 1914–15:

Another General Election was required to take place before the end of 1915. The political parties had been making preparations for an election to take place and by July 1914, the following candidates had been selected;

- Liberal: John Roberts
- Unionist: W. Henry Williams
