= Arthur Strauss =

British politician

- Strauss in 1895

Member of Parliament for Paddington North
- In office 1910–1918

Member of Parliament for Camborne
- In office 1895–1900

Personal details
- Born: Issidor Arthur Strauss; 28 April 1847 Mayence, Germany
- Died: 30 November 1920 (aged 73)
- Party: Liberal Unionist (1892–c.1905); Conservative (c.1905–1918); Independent Labour (1918); Labour (from 1919)
- Spouse: Minna Cohen (m. 1893)
- Children: 2, including George

Arthur Isidor Strauss (28 April 1847 – 30 November 1920) was a British Liberal Unionist, and later Conservative Member of Parliament who latterly joined the Labour Party.

== Early life ==
Arthur Strauss was born Issidor Arthur Strauss on 29 April 1847 in Mayence (Mainz), Rhineland-Palatinate, Germany. He was the son of Samuel Strauss (born 8 November 1811, Kriegsheim, Germany), a merchant, and Rosalia Drucker (born 4 January 1820, Frankfurt, Germany). Strauss had two brothers: Heinrich Alphons Strauss (21 December 1841, Mainz – 14 June 1906, London) and Sigmund Ferdinand Strauss (16 November 1843, Mainz – 13 July 1882, Paris). Strauss lived together with his elder brother Heinrich, at 91 St George's Square, Pimlico, London, until his marriage.

He was educated at a German university where he took first prizes in mathematics, Latin and Greek. In 1884, while living at 91 St. George's Square, London, he became a naturalised British citizen and modified his name to Arthur Isidor Strauss, making his middle name 'Isador' (with one 's').

== Career ==
Strauss and his brother Heinrich Alphons were both tin and copper merchants and ran a highly successful metals business called A. Strauss & Co., situated at 16 Rood Lane, EC3, London.

=== Politics ===
In the General Election of 1892, Strauss, a Liberal Unionist, lost to Charles Augustus Vansittart Conybeare (Liberal) by 438 votes in the battle for the Camborne constituency of Cornwall.

He was first elected to the House of Commons of the United Kingdom at the 1895 General Election as MP for Camborne, Cornwall, having unsuccessfully contested the seat in 1892, defeating his 1892 election rival Charles A.V. Conybeare.

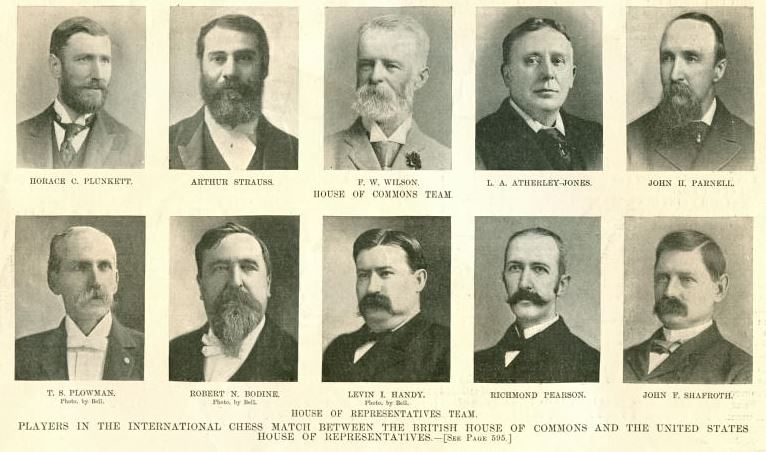
The photograph shows Arthur Strauss MP as a member of the International Chess Team of the House of Commons

Strauss was narrowly defeated by William Sproston Caine by 108 votes in the 1900 General Election, and failed to regain the seat at a by-election in 1903 after the death of his successor.

At the 1906 general election, he was selected to stand as the Conservative candidate in Paddington North, where the sitting Conservative MP Sir John Aird was retiring and the local Conservative Association had found difficulty in selecting a candidate. However, his selection proved controversial, because Strauss was Jewish and the Liberal Party candidate Leo Chiozza Money was Italian, and a committee of objectors to "foreign" candidates was formed which persuaded Sir Henry Burdett to run as an Independent Unionist candidate. Although the constituency had at times been marginal, Paddington North had been held by a Conservative since its creation in 1885, but the split Unionist vote allowed Money to win the seat for the Liberals.

Strauss was selected again to contest Paddington North at the 1910 election, and faced a repeat of the previous opposition. However, the dissident 'League of Patriotic Electors of North Paddington' decided in the end not field a candidate, and at the general election in January 1910, Strauss won the seat, having campaigned on tariff reform. He was re-elected in December 1910.

At the 1918 General Election, Strauss stood as an "Independent Labour" candidate and lost both the seat and his deposit, winning only 4.5% of the votes. He subsequently joined the Labour Party, but although he did not return to Parliament, his son George (1901–1993) also joined Labour and was an MP for 46 years, eventually becoming Father of the House in the 1970s and then a life peer.

== Personal life ==
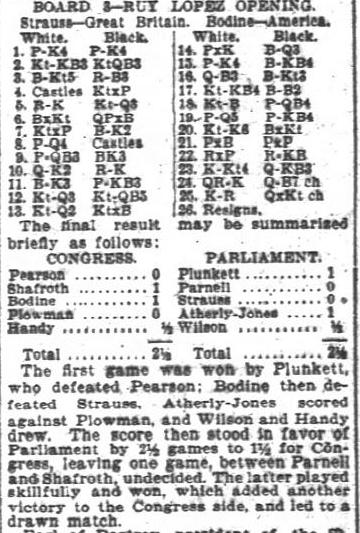
Chess moves made by Strauss, who resigns the game in the 26th move against the American Bodine.

At the age of 46, Arthur Strauss married 29-year-old Minna Cohen on 3 June 1893 at the Register Office in the District of St. George's Square, Pimlico, London. They had two children: George Russell Strauss (1901–1993), a politician and for five years "Father of the House" (of Commons), and Victor Arthur Strauss (1895–1916), a lieutenant in the Royal Flying Corps who was killed in action in 1916. In 1901, Strauss was living with his wife in an eighteen-room mansion situated at No. 1 Kensington Palace Gardens, Kensington, London. The merchant banker and philanthropist, Isaac Seligman, lived down the road at No. 17 Kensington Palace Gardens.

Strauss also enjoyed playing chess and was a member of a House of Commons International Chess Team which played against a team of players from the United States House of Representatives in 1897. The team played chess games by transmitting moves through a transatlantic cable. Strauss lost his match against Congressman Robert N. Bodine, but the teams drew with 2½ points each.

Parliament of the United Kingdom
Preceded by Charles Conybeare	Member of Parliament for Camborne; 1895 – 1900	Succeeded by William Sproston Caine
Preceded by Leo Chiozza Money	Member of Parliament for Paddington North; January 1910 – 1918	Succeeded by William Perring
