= William Sproston Caine =

British politician (1842–1903)

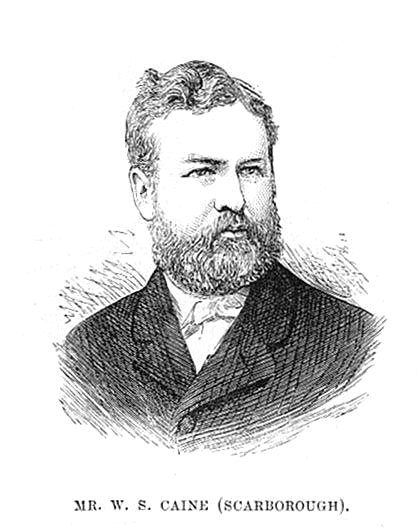
- Portrait (c. 1880)

Member of Parliament for Scarborough
- In office 1880–1885 Serving with John George Dodson (1880–1884); Richard Steble (1884–1885)
- Preceded by: Sir Harcourt Vanden-Bempde-Johnstone; Sir Charles Legard
- Succeeded by: Sir George Sitwell

Member of Parliament for Barrow-in-Furness
- In office 1886–1890
- Preceded by: David Duncan
- Succeeded by: James Duncan

Member of Parliament for Bradford East
- In office 1892–1895
- Preceded by: Henry Byron Reed
- Succeeded by: Henry Byron Reed

Member of Parliament for Camborne
- In office 1900–1903
- Preceded by: Arthur Strauss
- Succeeded by: Sir Wilfrid Lawson

Personal details
- Born: 26 March 1842 Seacombe, Cheshire, England
- Died: 17 March 1903 (aged 60) Mayfair, London, England
- Party: Liberal; Liberal Unionist
- Spouse: Alice Brown (m. 1868)
- Children: 5
- Parent: Nathaniel Caine (father)
- Relatives: William Caine (son); Ruth Caine (daughter); John Roberts (son-in-law); Hugh Stowell Brown (father-in-law); Trevor Roberts (grandson); Mervyn Roberts (grandson)

William Sproston Caine (26 March 1842 – 17 March 1903) was a British politician and temperance advocate. He was elected to the House of Commons for Scarborough in 1889 and represented the extreme radicals.

== Biography ==
Caine was born at Seacombe, Cheshire, the eldest surviving son of Nathaniel Caine, JP, a metal merchant from Cheshire, and of his wife Hanna née Rushton. He was educated at private schools in Egremont, Merseyside and Birkenhead before joining his father's company in 1861. In 1864 he was made a partner, before relocating to Liverpool in 1871. In 1873 he was recorded at 16 Alexandra Drive, Liverpool. Public affairs soon began to occupy large amounts of his attention, and he left the company in 1878.

After his retirement from his father's company, he retained the directorship of the Hodbarrow Mining Co. Ltd, Millom, and he secured the controlling interest of the Shaw's Brown Iron Co., Liverpool, leaving the management of the concern to his partner, Arthur S. Cox. The business terminated in 1893, leaving large amounts of debt which were discharged honourably, but Caine's resources were afterwards devoted largely to paying off the mortgage which he borrowed to meet the company's losses.

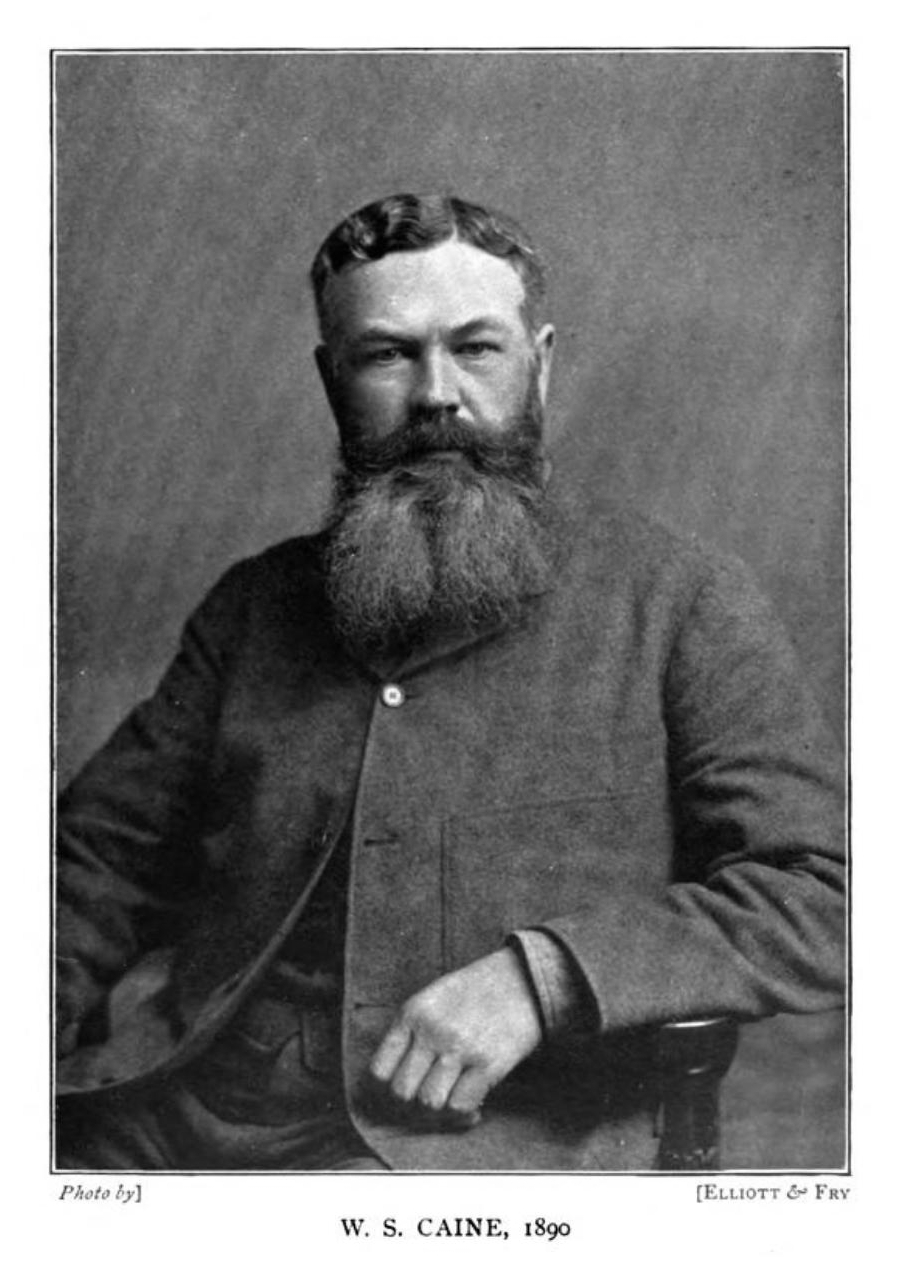
Caine in 1890

Caine was brought up as a Baptist, taught by Hugh Stowell Brown, whose daughter Alice married Caine in 1868; they had two sons (including the author William Caine) and three daughters, Ruth Herbert Lewis, collector of Welsh folk songs, Hannah (1869–1951) and Dorothea (1870–1953). Caine would tell the story of how he sat down to drink sherry whilst reading a temperance book by Julia Wightman. He was so convinced that he never drank again.

He joined the Liverpool Temperance and Band of Hope Union, also becoming chairman of the Popular Control and Licensing Reform Association. In 1873 he was elected vice-president of the United Kingdom Alliance. He was also president of the Baptist Total Abstinence Society, the Congregational Temperance Society, the British Temperance League, and the National Temperance Federation.

Caine first became interested in campaigning for parliament in 1873 to advance his temperance opinions, and unsuccessfully contested Liverpool in 1873 and 1874 for the Liberal Party. In 1880 he was elected for Scarborough and, identifying with the extreme radicals, began promoting temperance in the House of Commons. In 1884 he was made Civil Lord of the Admiralty in succession to Thomas Brassey, retaining his seat in parliament by the necessary by-election but losing in the 1885 general election.

In 1886, he was elected for Barrow-in-Furness after a by-election, and played an active part in organising the Liberal Unionist Party, which was nicknamed the "Brand of Caine" as a result. Caine was appointed Chief Whip for the Liberal Unionists, but his extreme temperance opinions soon damaged the Unionist alliance with the Conservative Party. After the passing of a scheme compensating possessors of extinguished public-house licences, Caine resigned as Whip and as an M.P. in protest. He campaigned for reelection at the by-election as an Independent Liberal, but was defeated.

In 1892, he was elected again for Bradford East but lost his seat at the 1895 election. His daughter Hannah married John Roberts, 1st Baron Clwyd in 1893. Another daughter, Ruth, married Liberal MP Herbert Lewis in 1897. Caine rejoined the House in 1900, representing Camborne. Parliamentary activities exhausted his health, and after a journey to South America in 1902 failed to restore it, he died of heart failure in 1903 in Mayfair aged 60.

== Caine and India ==
Caine visited India and realized that India also needed a movement to reduce alcoholism. In 1888 he established the Anglo-Indian Temperance Association in London along with Samuel Smith. In 1888-89 he visited India on a temperance tour along with retired Baptist priest Thomas Evans of Mussoorie. They made use of the network of the Indian National Congress and of missionaries associated with educational institutions for their support. He attended the Allahabad session of the Indian National Congress. Seventeen Indian constituencies gave support, and half the Congress delegates became members of local temperance associations. Evans suggested that for effectiveness Caine needed to work through the institution of Indian caste, a scheme which resulted in a very effective example in the Kayastha Temperance Society led by Kamta Prasad. He sought the removal of the Abkari system of revenue that the British government was trying to grow. In 1890 he wrote a series of articles in the Pall Mall Gazette where he advocated Indian self-government. Due to his opposition to alcohol he was praised by Gandhi.

Roger Ayres has suggested that Caine was the model for the story "The Enlightenments of Pagett, M.P." by Rudyard Kipling in which Kipling caricatures a British MP who spends a winter in India and returns to become an expert on solving Indian problems. Kipling's "Pagett" was a liberal endorser of A.O. Hume and particularly of William Digby, to whom Caine dedicated his 1890 guidebook Picturesque India. Caine served on a commission on Indian expenditure during 1895-96 and was also on the opium commission, but was unable to take part due to poor health.

Parliament of the United Kingdom
Preceded by Sir Harcourt Vanden-Bempde-Johnstone; Sir Charles Legard	Member of Parliament for Scarborough; 1880 – 1885; With: John George Dodson 1880–1884; Richard Steble 1884–1885	Succeeded by Sir George Sitwell
Preceded by David Duncan	Member of Parliament for Barrow-in-Furness; 1886 – 1890	Succeeded by James Duncan
Preceded by Henry Byron Reed	Member of Parliament for Bradford East; 1892 – 1895	Succeeded by Henry Byron Reed
Preceded by Arthur Strauss	Member of Parliament for Camborne; 1900 – 1903	Succeeded by Sir Wilfrid Lawson
