= C. T. Atkinson =

Christopher Thomas Atkinson
- Born: 6 September 1874
- Died: 18 February 1964 (aged 89)

Academic background
- Education: Magdalen College, Oxford

Academic work
- Discipline: Military history
- Institutions: University of Oxford

Christopher Thomas Atkinson (born on 6 September 1874 - died 18 February 1964) was the preeminent tutor for British military history at the University of Oxford in the first half of the twentieth century.

== Early life, education, and family ==
Atkinson attended Clifton College in Bristol, England, before going on to study at Magdalen College, Oxford, where he obtained a first class degree in modern history in 1896, then gained a second in "Greats" in 1898. Also in 1898, he won the Lothian Prize Essay with his 200-page study on the sixteenth-century French statesman Michel de l'Hôpital. In 1912, he married Cosette Maurice, sister of future Major-General Sir Frederick Maurice. She died in 1924.

== Academic career ==
In 1898, Exeter College, Oxford elected him a Fellow. The University of Oxford selected its first lecturer in military history, Sir Foster Cunliffe in 1905. Three years later, the university appointed an additional tutor to assist in a special subject on military history, focusing on the Napoleonic Wars. Atkinson was the first to hold this post. After Cunliffe's post expired in 1908 and then made redundant with the establishment of the Chichele Professor of Military History in 1909, Atkinson continued as the tutor for the special subject in conjunction with Professor Charles Oman. By 1924, a relatively small number of students had chosen to read the special subject. Oman and Atkinson believed that this was largely due to the fact that the study up to that point had focused too much on tactics rather than strategy and that the campaigns studied had shifted to continental campaigns that did not involve British troops in the 1805–1808 period. They proposed a new syllabus that included Clausewitz On War and Hamley Operations of War, complemented by an outline study of the Peninsular War with a special study within it of the Peninsular campaign of 1812. The university's History faculty Board adopted the proposal and it remained the topic in use for the next 25 years until 1950. In 1951, the special subject in military history shifted to a study of Britain in the Mediterranean, 1797–1802, to include naval history and substituting Julian Corbett Some Principles of Maritime Strategy for Hamley's Operations of War. The study improved on the previous special subject by including more political material and staying away from narrowly conceived approaches to military history.

From 1909 to 1920, Atkinson was an active officer in the Oxford University Officer Training Corps. He remained at Exeter for his entire career, except for wartime service between 1914 and 1918, when he served as an Army Captain in the Historical Section of the Committee of Imperial Defence (CID) in Whitehall Garden, London. On 27 January 1915, Atkinson and Julian Corbett were formally appointed to begin collecting material for an official history of the war. Atkinson was eventually based at the Public Record Office, where he eventually became head of the Army Historical Office, while Corbett became head of the CID Historical Section.

From 1928 to 1949, he served as a member of the Oxford University Delegacy for Military Instruction. During the Second World War, he was a member of the Home Guard. He retired at Exeter in 1941, becoming an emeritus Fellow of the college.

Atkinson was still teaching the Special Subject in military history at Oxford as late as the Autumn and Winter of 1954–55.

As a tutor, he was remembered for his sharp mind, downright phrases, and ironic turn of phrase along with many idiosyncrasies and prejudices that included his dislike of Sir Basil Liddle Hart and Napoleon. One obituarist wrote "remarks on essays could be downright salty, but they were always in character and never ill-natured, so they were received by their victims with relish rather than resentment."

He was a long-time member of the Navy Records Society (NRS), where he became involved in his Oxford colleague S. R. Gardiner in completing his series of edited volumes on the First Anglo-Dutch War between 1898 and 1930. He served as a member of the NRS Council from 1903-to 1906 and 1909 to 1914. LAter, he became notably active with the Society for Army Historical Research, became a regular contributor to its Journal, to which he contributed 91 articles between 1927 and 1960. He served many years on its council, later becoming a vice-president of the Society.

== Publications ==
- Michel de L'Hospital: being the Lothian prize essay, 1899 (London: Longmans, Green and Co., 1900).
- History of Germany: 1715–1815 (Pennsylvania: Jacobs, 1908).
- A curtail'd memoir of incidents and occurrences in the life of John Surman Carden, vice admiral in the British navy (1912)
- Marlborough and the rise of the British Army (New York; London: G.P. Putnam's Sons, 1921).
- Letters and papers relating to the First Dutch War, 1652–1654 Publications of the Navy Records Society. 6 vols. (London: Navy Records Society, 1898–1930). [Vols 1–2 edited by Samuel Rawson Gardiner. Volume 3 edited by Samuel Rawson Gardiner and C. T. Atkinson; vols 4–6 by C. T. Atkinson.]
- The Queen's Own Royal West Kent Regiment - 1914–1919 (London: Simpkin, Marshall, Hamilton, Kent, 1924).
- The Devonshire Regiment, 1914–1918 (Exeter: Eland Brothers; London: Simpkin, Marshall, Hamilton, Kent, 1926).
- The Seventh Division, 1914–1918 (London: John Murray, 1927).
- The South Wales Borderers, 24th Foot, 1689–1937 (Cambridge: Printed for the Regimental History Committee at the University Press, 1937).
- A Royal Dragoon in the Spanish Succession War-- A Contemporary Narrative, edited with introduction and notes by C.T. Atkinson. Special Publication no. 5 (London: Society of Army Historical Research, 1938).
- Great Britain. Royal Commission on Historical Manuscripts, Supplementary report on the manuscripts of Robert Graham Esq. of Fintry edited by C. T. Atkinson (London: HMSO, 1940).
- The Dorsetshire Regiment: the Thirty-Ninth and Fifty-Fourth Foot and the Dorset Militia and Volunteers (Oxford : Privately printed at the University Press, 1947).
- A history of the 1st (P.W.O.) Battalion: the Dogra Regiment 1887–1947, 37th Dogras, 1887–1923, 1st (P.W.O.) Bn., 17th Dogra Rgt., 1922–1945 (Southampton: printed for the subscribers by the Camelot Press, 1950).

In addition, he reviewed books regularly in The English Historical Review, contributed to the Encyclopædia Britannica (twelfth edition), and wrote three chapters in the Cambridge Modern History (volumes 5 and 6).
