= Henry Byron Reed =

English Conservative Party politician

Reed in 1895.

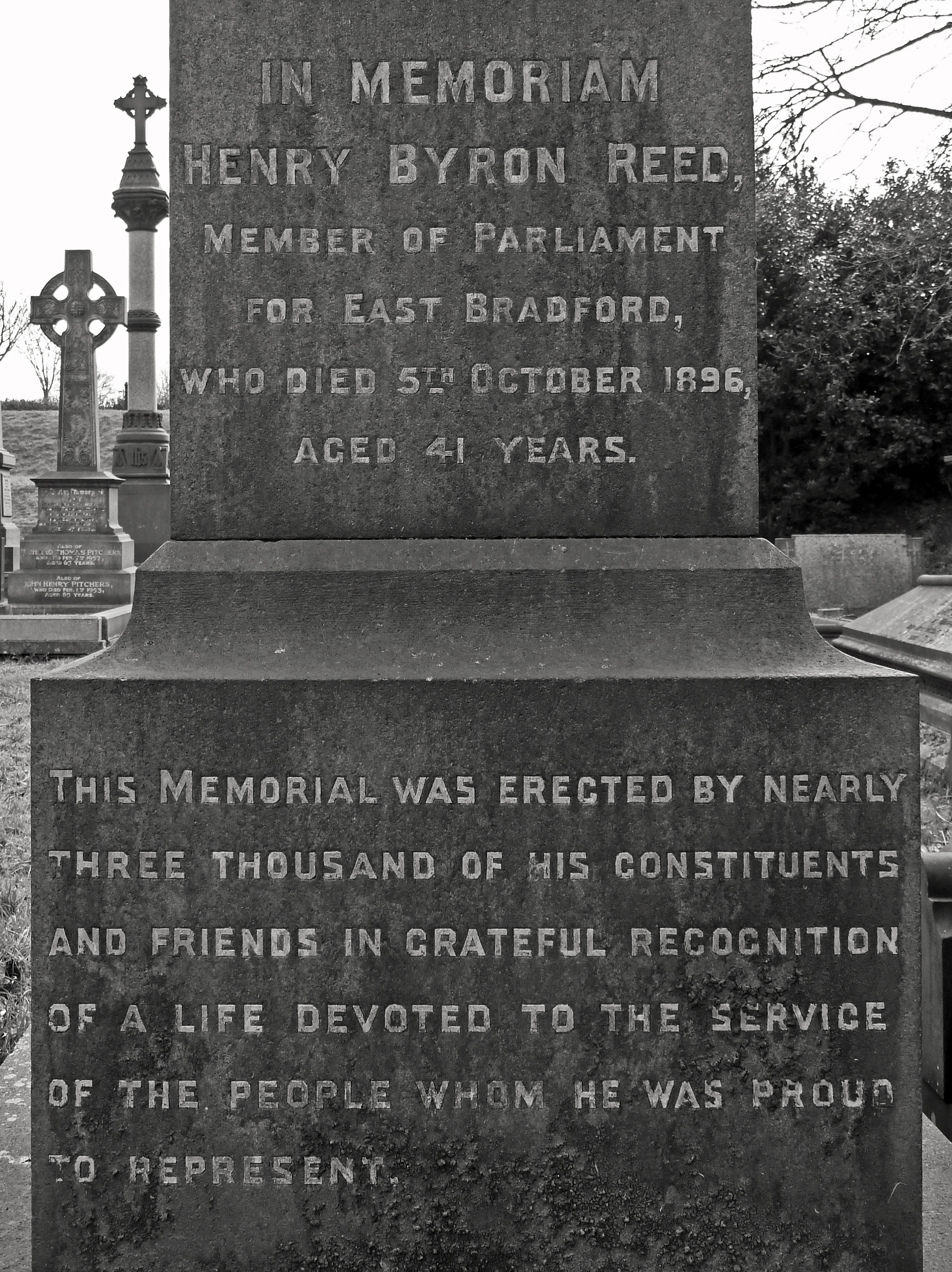
Henry Byron Reed memorial at Undercliffe Cemetery, Bradford.

Henry Byron Reed (1855 – 5 October 1896) was an English Conservative Party politician. He was member of parliament (MP) for Bradford East for two terms in the 1880s and 1890s.

The eldest son of Henry Draper Reed, he grew up and was educated privately in the south London suburb of Sydenham.

Reed was an opponent of any attempts to disestablish the Church of England, and was a leading member of the Church Defence Institute. He moved to northern England, initially to Darlington in County Durham, where he was both a justice of the peace and member of the school board. He married Mary Hannah Atkin of Sheffield.

Politically Reed was a Conservative, and was a long-term member of the National Union of Conservative and Unionist Associations. He first stood for Parliament at the 1885 general election, when he was unsuccessful candidate in the new Western division of Bradford; all of Bradford's three seats were won by Liberals. At the 1886 general election, he stood instead in the Eastern division, and won the seat with a majority of 3.4% of the votes. Reed was defeated in 1892 by the Liberal William Sproston Caine, but regained the seat in 1895.

On 3 October 1896 Reed was involved in an accident when his pony trap overturned near his residence "Woodcliff", Ventnor, Isle of Wight. He initially appeared only to be suffering from concussion, but died two days later from an apparent cerebral hemorrhage aged 41.

Parliament of the United Kingdom
Preceded by Angus Holden	Member of Parliament for Bradford East; 1886–1892	Succeeded by William Sproston Caine
Preceded by William Sproston Caine	Member of Parliament for Bradford East; 1895–1896	Succeeded by Ronald Greville
Party political offices
Preceded by Frederick Dixon-Hartland	Chairman of the National Union of Conservative and Constitutional Associations; 1891	Succeeded by Charles Stuart-Wortley
