= Charles Conybeare (Liberal politician) =

English barrister and Liberal politician (1853–1919)

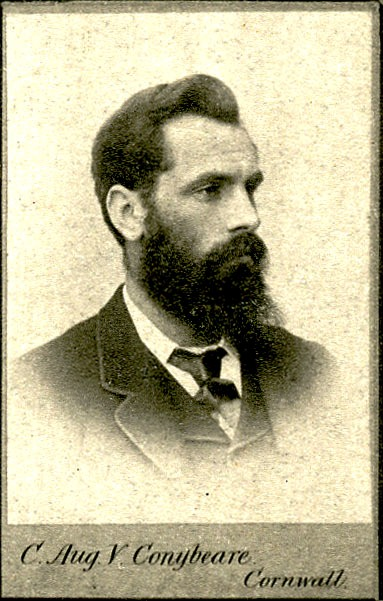

Charles Augustus Vansittart Conybeare (1 June 1853 – 18 February 1919) was an English barrister and a radical Liberal politician who sat in the House of Commons from 1885 to 1895.

== Background ==
Conybeare was born at Kew, London, the son of John Conybeare, a wealthy barrister, and Katherine Vansittart. He was educated at Tonbridge School and Christ Church, Oxford where he won the Lothian Prize with a study on The Place of Iceland in the History of European Institutions. He was assistant master at Manchester Grammar School from 1877 to 1878 and was called to the bar at Gray's Inn in 1881. He married Florence Annie Strauss, the daughter of a Bohemian glass merchant, on 15 October 1896, at the Theistic Church in Piccadilly, London. She was an active member of the Women's Suffragette Movement. The couple began their married life in a spacious apartment at 3 Carlyle Gardens, Cheyne Walk, Chelsea, London. Charles Conybeare owned or leased Tregullow House, a country pile in Scorrier, Cornwall, that had been passed down through the Williams family, a well-known local family that had made their fortune in the mining of tin and copper.

=== Marriage settlement ===
Charles and Florence Conybeare were the co-beneficial owners of a property known as the Tregullow Offices, which Charles Conybeare bought in 1889 from the Williams family (mining moguls), and which he mortgaged in 1891 to raise some capital required for a marriage settlement. The financing of this marriage settlement, which effectively entitled Florence to half the value of the property in the event of desertion or divorce, was managed by Isaac Seligman, a wealthy and prominent German-born merchant banker based in London. The couple sold the property in 1902 to a Charles Rule Williams (no relation to the Williams mining mogul family), a retired mining engineer who renamed it Zimapan Villa (Note: The 1902 Indenture in which the "Tregullow Offices" (later Zimapan Villa) are sold by Conybeare and his wife on 21 July 1902: copy of document on www.zimapanners.com by Peter King Smith.)

=== Oakfield Park ===
Conybeare owned Oakfield Park (the house) until the death of his wife Florence Annie in February 1916. Conybeare bought or leased the property which was situated within the grounds and estate of Oakfield Park.

== Political career ==
In 1885, Conybeare was elected as MP for Camborne. Although he was a Liberal, he was not the official Liberal candidate, but once elected, took the Liberal whip in the House of Commons. He was a member of the London School Board (Finsbury), from 1888 to 1890. While MP for Camborne, Conybeare, who was nicknamed the "Miners' Friend", proposed changes to mining legislation including: (a) changes in the Stannaries Act 1887 aimed at ending the system whereby miners had their pay shared out in a public house, and at protecting miners from mine agents who randomly broke contracts of employment, (b) renewal of China-clay leases and (c) the introduction of a mines' inspector drawn from working miners, aimed at reducing the mortality in Cornish mines, which was higher among Cornish miners due to "unsanitary conditions". In 1889, Conybeare was imprisoned in Derry Gaol for helping to distribute bread to destitute, evicted Irish tenants at Falcarragh, County Donegal, which was regarded then as a criminal act under the Criminal Law and Procedure (Ireland) Act 1887. He lost his seat in 1895 and failed in his attempt to be elected at St Helens in 1900. Conybeare was interested in women's suffrage and was a member of the Men's League for Women's Suffrage. In 1910 he made another unsuccessful attempt to re-enter parliament, standing as Liberal candidate at Horncastle. In 1914 he was chosen as Liberal candidate for Wells for the general election expected to take place in 1915, however, the outbreak of war postponed the elections and he never stood for parliament again.

=== Electoral record ===
General election 1885: Camborne
Party	Candidate	Votes	%	±%
Independent Liberal	Charles Conybeare	2,926	53.2	n/a
Liberal	Arthur Vivian	2,577	46.8	n/a
Majority		349	6.4	n/a
Turnout			77.1	n/a
Independent Liberal win (new seat)				

General election 1886: Camborne
Party	Candidate	Votes	%	±%
Liberal	Charles Conybeare	3,156	61.6	n/a
Liberal Unionist	J D Gay	1,969	38.4	n/a
Majority		1,187	23.2	+16.8
Turnout			71.8	−5.3
Liberal hold		Swing	n/a	

General election 1900: St Helens
Party	Candidate	Votes	%	±%
Conservative	Henry Seton-Karr	5,300	60.9	+7.4
Liberal	Charles Conybeare	3,402	39.1	−7.4
Majority		1,898	21.8	+14.8
Turnout			80.9	−7.5
Conservative hold		Swing	+7.4	

General election January 1910: Horncastle
Party	Candidate	Votes	%	±%
Conservative	Lord Willoughby de Eresby	5,162	54.6	+3.7
Liberal	Charles Conybeare	4,292	45.4	−3.7
Majority		870	9.2	+7.4
Turnout			90.0	+3.4
Conservative hold		Swing	+3.7	

== Death ==
Conybeare moved away from Dartford to live in Bexley, Kent, after the death of his wife. He died in Brogueswood, Biddenden, Kent, 44 miles from Bexley, on 18 February, aged 65 He was buried in the churchyard of St Mary the Virgin Church, Fryerning, near Ingatestone, Essex, close to his parents, but in the same tomb-memorial he had erected for Florence three years earlier.

== Publications ==
- The Place of Iceland in The History of European Institutions Parker 1877
- Married Women's Property Acts with Andrews 1883.
- Corrupt and Illegal Practices Act 1884

Parliament of the United Kingdom
New constituency	Member of Parliament for Camborne; 1885 – 1895	Succeeded by Arthur Strauss
