= Kitty Idwal Jones =

Welsh writer and missionary (1898–1984)

Alice Catherine Idwal Jones
- Born: Alice Catherine Mostyn Lewis; 1898; London
- Died: 1984
- Other name: Kitty
- Spouse: Idwal Jones

Alice Catherine "Kitty" Idwal Jones (née Lewis; 1898–1984) was a Welsh writer and missionary.

Born in London but also raised in Flintshire, Kitty was fluent in Welsh. As a young woman, she did volunteer and missionary work in India and Wales, including organising the Brynmawr Experiment. In 1933, she married Idwal Jones. She was heavily involved in the Welsh Folk-Song Society and acted as President for the Caerwys Eisteddfod in 1968.

== Early life ==
Catherine Mostyn Lewis was born in London in 1898 to Sir John Herbert Lewis and his second wife, Ruth. She was known as Kitty. She was raised as a Welsh-speaker. Her family split their time between two homes, one in London and the other, Plas Penucha, in Caerwys, Flintshire. Plas Penucha was also once the home of the poet and Methodist leader Tomos Jones, who was her direct ancestor.

She was educated at Clapham High School between 1908 and 1915 and then studied at University College of Wales, Aberystwyth from 1916 to 1918, graduating with a Bachelor of Arts degree. She spent a year at Grenoble University and also studied at Birmingham. She trained to become a teacher at London Day Training College.

== Career ==
=== Missionary and volunteering work ===
Inspired by a Student Christian Movement Conference in Glasgow she attended in January 1921, between 1922 and 1925, Kitty did missionary work with the Khasi people in Lushai, India, taking charge of the Girls' High School in Aijawl. Her trip was paid for by her parents, including the cost of building a house for Kitty in Aijawl. They visited her, along with her brother, Herbert Mostyn Lewis, in 1924, publishing the story of their visit in a book called Llythyrau o Lushai (transl. Letters from Lushai). She returned home after her father suffered an accident in Aberystwyth in 1925.

During the Depression, she volunteered to help those affected.

In the mid-1920s, Kitty Lewis formed the Welsh Student Self-Help Council. She helped organise work camps in Brynmawr in 1931 and 1932, known as the Brynmawr Experiment, where members from various British universities, as well as students from 37 other countries, volunteered to build a swimming pool and performed general refurbishment in the community. She also organised a similar scheme in Rhosllanerchrugog in 1932, supported by the International Voluntary Service, which built Ponciau Banks Park on land purchased by the committee of the local Miners' Institute.

In 1930, she visited America to collect contributions for the Welsh Student Loan Fund Committee.

=== Writing and cultural work ===
In 1946, she moved to the family home, Plas Penucha, Caerwys, after her mother's death. She was involved in organising and acted as president of the Caerwys Eisteddfod when it celebrated 400 years of local eisteddfodau in 1968.

She was a patron of Welsh literature and culture and participated in local and national Eisteddfodau. Like her mother and brother, she was heavily involved in the work of Cymdeithas Alawon Gwerin Cymru (transl. Welsh Folk-Song Society), as well as being a member of other literary and historical societies. She collected folk songs, and wrote articles on the composer Morfydd Llwyn Owen and about collecting folk songs. She was a strong supporter of Welsh devolution and a member of Plaid Cymru.

== Personal life ==
On 29 June 1933, she married Idwal Jones (1901–1965), who was a professor of education at University College of Wales, Aberystwyth and University College, Swansea. They had a son and two daughters.

== Legacy ==
The North East Wales Archives holds an archive of Kitty's personal documents and objects at its Hawarden Branch, including her birth certificate, several of her diaries, and the shoe buckles she used as part of her ceremonial dress at the Caerwys Eisteddfod.
