= William Caine (author) =

UK author (1873–1923)

- Born: 28 August 1873; Liverpool, England
- Died: 2 September 1925 (aged 52)
- Education: St Andrews University; Balliol College, Oxford
- Occupations: Barrister & author
- Parents: William Sproston Caine (father); Alice Brown (mother)
- Relatives: Ruth Herbert Lewis (sister); Herbert Lewis (brother-in-law); John Roberts (brother-in-law); Rev. Hugh Stowell Brown (maternal grandfather)

William Caine (28 August 1873 – 2 September 1925) was a British author of stories and humorous novels.

== Biography ==
He was born in Liverpool, the son of politician William Sproston Caine and Alice Brown Caine, daughter of the Rev. Hugh Stowell Brown. He was educated at Manor House School in Clapham, Westminster School, St Andrews University and Balliol College, Oxford. After graduating from Oxford he worked as a barrister, but after seven years abandoned that profession for writing. He married harpist Edith Gordon Walker, daughter of Farmer R. Walker of Boston, Massachusetts, and they lived at 16 The Pryors, East Heath Road, London NW3. He was a member of the Reform Club.

Caine was a keen angler, friendly with fellow angler-author Hugh Tempest Sheringham (1876-1930), and an artist, cartoonist and illustrator, friendly with and influenced by the younger cartoonist H. M. Bateman. Bateman often included caricatures of Caine in his published drawings, and provided the illustrations for Bildad the Quill-Driver (1916) and the posthumous What a Scream!. The Glutton's Mirror (1925) and Smoke Rings (1926) are collections of Caine's own caricatures and burlesques. Caine had a heart condition and died suddenly in Ostend, Belgium while on holiday with his wife.

== Books ==
Caine was best known in his lifetime for his magazine and newspaper articles and short stories, published regularly in Pearsons, The Field, Punch, The Evening Standard and The Morning Post. His books span the genres of light comedy, romance, social issues, adventure and travel.

The Times Literary Supplement described the title character of Caine’s first novel Pilkington as “a kind of legal ‘Verdant Green.’ He comes up, a simple-minded prig, from Cambridge, and falls into the hands of friends in ‘the honourable Society of the Outer Temple,’ who show a real creative genius in playing off practical jokes upon him. They, and the reader, have much entertainment; but Pilkington ‘gets home’ in the end.” His second novel, The Confectioners (1906, with John Fairbairn), was described by the Times Literary Supplement as “a rollicking and original tale of the great factory of Simon Muddock, where all the wants of man were met by chemical preparations; of its overthrow by the discovery of ‘Gruntleite,’ the universal producer, with a surprising sequel.”

Caine’s next two novels, The Pursuit of the President (1907) and The Victim & The Votery (1908), both take the suffragette cause as material for satire and comedy. The former “is a rollicking account of the efforts of Miss Waugh, a Suffragette leader, to interview a member of the Cabinet”; “it is laughter-provoking from the first page to the last, with here and there a dash of caustic, penetrating criticism, which shows that the author is capable of a good deal more than mere buffoonery.” The latter, in which democratic hopes have given way to disillusionment and extremism, “tells of the efforts of a particularly virulent suffragette to kidnap the Prime Minister in a way that moves to laughter on every page.” His fifth book, Boom! (1909), sold well, running into six editions.

Hoffman's Chance (1912) is about the birth and death of a would-be comic opera. For source material Caine drew on his own experiences of working with composer Osborne Roberts, brother of John Roberts, 1st Baron Clwyd, on The Island of Pharos, a comic opera which was produced by amateurs for charity at Chelsea Town Hall, London, May 18–20, 1904, before touring professionally in July and August. He also wrote some lyrics for the successful 1906 musical comedy The Belle of Mayfair.

Bildad the Quill-Driver (1916) includes elements of Arabian fantasy. The Strangeness of Noel Carton (1921) is a psychological thriller told in journal form, with a striking book jacket by Salomon van Abbé. The Author of Trixie (1924), a tale of mis-represented authorship, was later highlighted by Vladimir Nabokov in his 1941 novel The Real Life of Sebastian Knight as one of the books on the shelves of the fictional author Sebastian Knight. Lady Sheba's Last Stunt (1925) relates the unintended consequences of a scandalous memoir.

== Publications ==
- Pilkington (1906)
- The Confectioners (1906; with John Fairbairn)
- The Pursuit of the President (1907)
- The Victim and the Votery (1908)
- Boom! (1909), a novel of the century
- A Prisoner In Spain (1910)
- The Revolt at Roskelly's (1910)
- Old Enough to Know Better (1911)
- The Devil In Solution (1911)
- Save Us From Our Friends
- An Angler At Large (1911)
- The New Foresters (1913)
- Hoffman's Chance (1912)
- The Irresistible Intruder (1914)
- But She Meant Well (1914)
- Bildad the Quill-Driver (1916)
- Great Snakes (1916)
- The Fan, and other stories (1917)
- Drones (1917)
- Monsieur Segotin's Story (1917), a story from occupied Belgium
- Three's a Crowd (1917), an anglo-American comedy
- The Wife who came Alive (1919)
- The Strangeness of Noel Carton (1921)
- Mendoza and a Little Lady (1921), a romance
- The Author of "Trixie" (1924)
- The Brave Little Tailor (1923; with George Calderon)
- The Glutton's Mirror (1925), drawings
- Lady Sheba's Last Stunt (1925)
- The Methods of Mendoza (1926)
- Smoke Rings (1926), humour
- Fish, Fishing and Fishermen (1927)
- What a Scream! and other stories (1927)
