= Herbert Lewis (politician) =

Welsh politician (1858-1933)

The Right Honourable Sir Herbert Lewis GBE
- Herbert Lewis c1895

Parliamentary Secretary to the Board of Education
- In office 30 May 1915 – 19 October 1922
- Prime Minister: H. H. Asquith; David Lloyd George
- Preceded by: Christopher Addison
- Succeeded by: Eustace Percy

Parliamentary Secretary to the Local Government Board
- In office 7 July 1909 – 30 May 1915
- Prime Minister: H. H. Asquith
- Preceded by: Charles Masterman
- Succeeded by: William Hayes Fisher

Member of Parliament for University of Wales
- In office 14 December 1918 – 15 November 1922
- Preceded by: Constituency created
- Succeeded by: Thomas Arthur Lewis

Member of Parliament for Flintshire
- In office 8 February 1906 – 14 December 1918
- Preceded by: Samuel Smith
- Succeeded by: Tom Parry

Member of Parliament for Flint Boroughs
- In office 26 July 1892 – 8 February 1906
- Preceded by: John Roberts
- Succeeded by: Howell Idris

Personal details
- Born: 27 December 1858 Mostyn, Flintshire, Wales, UK
- Died: 10 November 1933 (aged 74) Caerwys, Flintshire, Wales, UK
- Party: Liberal (–1916)
- Other political affiliations: Coalition Liberal (1916–1922); National Liberal (1922–1923)
- Spouse(s): Adelaide Hughes (m. 1886; died 1895) Ruth Caine (m. 1897–1933)
- Children: 2
- Parents: Enoch Lewis (father); Catherine Roberts (mother)
- Relatives: William Sproston Caine (father-in-law); Alice Brown Caine (mother-in-law); William Caine (brother-in-law)
- Education: McGill University; Exeter College, Oxford

Herbert Lewis c1905

Sir John Herbert Lewis (27 December 1858 – 10 November 1933) was a Welsh Liberal Party politician.

== Background and education ==
Born at Mostyn Quay, Flintshire, Lewis was the only child of Enoch Lewis and Catherine Roberts. It is possible that Lewis was related to C.S. Lewis. This speculation is the result of the fact that C.S. Lewis's grandfather, Richard Lewis, was born in Flintshire in 1775. He was educated at McGill University and Exeter College, Oxford.

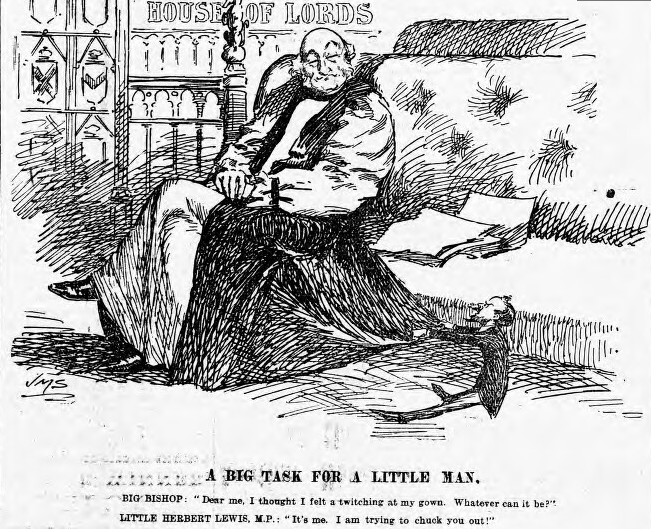
Cartoon by J. M. Staniforth satirising Lewis' unsuccessful attempt to remove the Lords Spiritual from the House of Lords.

== Political career ==
Lewis was the first Chairman of Flintshire County Council. He was Member of Parliament MP for Flint Boroughs 1892–1906. In 1894, he resigned the Liberal Whip in the so-called 'Welsh Revolt', joining David Alfred Thomas, David Lloyd George and Frank Edwards. In a letter to T. E. Ellis, Lewis wrote to his friend, then Chief Whip: 'I will never again fight a constituency as an official Liberal.' Although he later recanted, this episode was illustrative of Herbert Lewis' moral seriousness. With Lloyd George, Lewis was an enthusiastic supporter of Cymru Fydd, a nationalist movement within Welsh Liberalism. Along with Lloyd George and David Alfred Thomas, he opposed the Boer War at the 1900 General Election. He was elected for Flintshire in 1906.

Lewis was a Lord of the Treasury, 1905–1909. He was re-elected twice in 1910, the second time unopposed;

Lewis was Parliamentary Secretary to the Local Government Board, 1909–1915. He was Parliamentary Secretary to the Board of Education, 1915–1922, and played a key role in drawing up the Education Act 1918, often known as the Fisher Act.

At the 1918 general election he contested the new University of Wales constituency as a Coalition Liberal;

He was offered a peerage on his retirement from Parliament in 1922, but declined the honour. He was appointed a Knight Grand Cross of the Order of the British Empire (GBE) in the 1922 Dissolution Honours List.

Lewis was made a Privy Counsellor in 1912, a freeman of the towns of Flint and Aberystwyth, Constable of Flint Castle, honorary LL.D of the University of Wales in 1918. He was awarded the gold medal of the Honourable Society of Cymmrodorion in 1927.

=== Elections contested ===
==== UK Parliament elections ====
Date of election	Constituency	Party	Votes	%	Result
1892	Flint Boroughs	Liberal	1,883	55.3	Elected
1895	Flint Boroughs	Liberal	1,828	52.4	Elected
1900	Flint Boroughs	Liberal	1,760	55.5	Elected
1906	Flintshire	Liberal	6,294	63.8	Elected
1910 (Jan)	Flintshire	Liberal	6,610	59.7	Elected
1910 (Dec)	Flintshire	Liberal	Unopposed		Elected
1918	University of Wales	National Liberal	739	80.8	Elected

== Post politics ==
Lewis was a keen supporter of the National Library of Wales, located in Aberystwyth. In 1909 he became a Vice President of the Library. In 1925, while walking in the hills above the town prior to a meeting of the Library's council, Lewis suffered a fall down a quarry which left him paralyzed for the rest of his life. Although elected President of the Library in 1926, this was a largely honorific appointment.

An active lay member of the Calvinistic Methodist Connexion, Lewis was elected Moderator of the denomination in 1925, although he declined the post. He was an interested correspondent in the trial for unorthodoxy of Thomas Williams (Tom Nefyn). Among his other correspondents in religious matters was the Welsh Revivalist Evan Roberts.

== Personal life ==
Sir John Herbert Lewis was married twice, first in 1886 to Adelaide (d. 1895), daughter of Charles Hughes, publisher, Wrexham and in 1897 to Ruth, daughter of Alice and W. S. Caine, MP. By his second marriage he had a son and a daughter, Kitty Idwal Jones. He resided at Plas Penucha, Caerwys, Flintshire. Lewis died at his home, Plas Penucha, in 1933.

Parliament of the United Kingdom
Preceded by John Roberts	Member of Parliament for Flint Boroughs; 1892 – 1906	Succeeded by Howell Idris
Preceded by Samuel Smith	Member of Parliament for Flintshire; 1906 – 1918	Succeeded by Tom Parry
New constituency	Member of Parliament for University of Wales; 1918 – 1922	Succeeded by Thomas Arthur Lewis
Political offices
Preceded by Charles Masterman	Parliamentary Secretary to the Local Government Board; 1909–1915	Succeeded by William Hayes Fisher
Preceded by Christopher Addison	Parliamentary Secretary to the Board of Education; 1915–1922	Succeeded by Lord Eustace Percy
