= Isaac Seligman =

American merchant banker and philanthropist

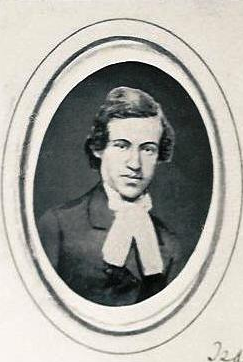
- Born: Isaak Seligmann; 2 December 1834; Baiersdorf, Erlangen-Hochstadt, Bavaria, Germany
- Died: 9 April 1928 (aged 93); Kensington, London, England
- Occupation: Merchant banker
- Known for: Philanthropy
- Spouse: Lena Messel (m. 1869)

Isaac Seligman (2 December 1834 – 9 April 1928) was an American merchant banker and philanthropist.

== Background ==
He was born Isaak Seligmann in Baiersdorf, Erlangen-Hochstadt, Kingdom of Bavaria, to David Isaak Seligman and Fanny Steinhardt. He was the youngest of eight brothers, all of whom emigrated to America and became involved in running various branch offices of the merchant banking house J. & W. Seligman & Co., co-founded in Manhattan, New York City in 1846 by Isaak's elder brothers, James and Joseph Seligman. Isaak later changed his name to Isaac, and in August 1857, at the age of 23, Seligman joined his entrepreneurial brothers in the United States.

== Merchant banker ==
Seligman went on to run 'Seligman Brothers', the London branch of the Seligman merchant-banking empire with his brother Leopold, at 18 Austin Friars, EC2.

== Marriage ==
He married 18-year-old Lina Messel (b. Darmstadt 1851) in London in 1869. Between 1869 and 1886, Lena bore him three daughters and four sons, the eldest son being Charles David Seligman. His youngest daughter, Edith Babette Seligman, married Charles Samuel Myers in 1904.

== Philanthropist ==
Seligman was also a fundraiser for, benefactor to, and activist in, a large number of charitable and political organisations including the American Society in London, the Anglo-Jewish Association (lobbying against oppression of Serbian Jews), the German Association (raising funds for those wounded or made destitute by the Franco-Prussian War), the Mansion House Committee (raising funds for distressed Jews in Russia), the Eighty Club in London (social and political), and the Jew's Deaf and Dumb Home (lip-reading for deaf and mute), founded by Baroness M. de Rothschild, of which Seligman was the treasurer in 1875.

== Seligman and Charles A.V. Conybeare ==
In 1896, Seligman was appointed joint legal owner and trustee of the 'Tregullow Offices' (later Zimapan Villa), a former Cornish mine office belonging to the Williams mining-mogul family of Scorrier, Cornwall, by Charles Augustus Vansittart Conybeare, barrister-at-law and MP for Camborne, Cornwall (1885–1895). Seligman was released from his trusteeship in 1902 when Conybeare and his wife sold their property, which originally formed part of a marriage settlement, to mining engineer Charles Rule Williams,

== Luxury home in Kensington ==
In 1899, Seligman bought 17 Kensington Palace Gardens, London, a grand mansion built in the north Italian villa style, near Arthur Strauss MP (Charles Conybeare's parliamentary successor), who lived down at the end of the tree-lined boulevard at No. 1 Kensington Palace Gardens. At that time, Seligman's principal home, now part of London's billionaire's row, had at least four reception rooms and 13 bedrooms.

== Death ==
Seligman died a wealthy man in 1928 at the age of 93, leaving a fortune in his will valued at more than GBP 18 million in today's money.
