= Baron Clwyd =

Title in the Peerage of the United Kingdom

Baron Clwyd, of Abergele in the County of Denbigh, is a title in the Peerage of the United Kingdom. It was created in 1919 for the Liberal politician Sir John Roberts, 1st Baronet, who had previously represented Denbighshire West in the House of Commons. He had already been created a Baronet, of Brynwenallt in the parish of Abergele in the County of Denbigh, in the Baronetage of the United Kingdom in 1908. Lord Clwyd's father John Roberts had earlier been Member of Parliament for Flint from 1878 to 1892. As of 2016 the titles are held by his great-grandson, the fourth Baron, who succeeded his father in 2006.

The title of the barony, Clwyd, is pronounced "Cloo-id".

== Baron Clwyd (1919) ==
- John Herbert Roberts, 1st Baron Clwyd (1863–1955)
- (John) Trevor Roberts, 2nd Baron Clwyd (1900–1987)
- (John) Anthony Roberts, 3rd Baron Clwyd (1935–2006)
- John Murray Roberts, 4th Baron Clwyd (born 1971)

The heir apparent is the present holder's son, the Hon. John David Roberts (born 2006).

=== Line of succession ===
- John Herbert Roberts, 1st Baron Clwyd (1863–1955)
  - (John) Trevor Roberts, 2nd Baron Clwyd (1900–1987)
    - (John) Anthony Roberts, 3rd Baron Clwyd (1935–2006)
      - John Murray Roberts, 4th Baron Clwyd (born 1971)
        - (1) Hon. John David Roberts (b. 2006)
      - (2) Hon. Jeremy Trevor Roberts (b. 1973)
      - (3) Hon. Hugh Gerald Arthur Roberts (b. 1977)
  - Hon. David Stowell Roberts (1900–1956)
    - (4) Hugh Martin Roberts (b. 1941)
      - (5) Thomas Owen Roberts (b. 1973)
    - (6) Peter Gareth Roberts (b. 1947)
      - (7) Matthew Lewis Roberts (b. 1984)

== Arms ==
Coat of arms of Baron Clwyd
Notes Recorded in Burke's Peerage (1999). Crest A lion rampant per fess argent and azure, holding between the paws an ostrich feather or. Escutcheon Per pale azure and argent, a lion rampant between three ostrich feathers, all counterchanged. Supporters Dexter, a dragon proper, gorged with a collar or; sinister, a bear sable, gorged with a collar or. Motto TRA ANADL GOBAITH (While there's breath there's hope)

Baronetage of the United Kingdom
Preceded by Critchett baronets	Roberts baronets of Brynwenallt; 30 November 1908	Succeeded by Shaw baronets
