= John Roberts, 1st Baron Clwyd =

British politician (1863-1955)

John Herbert Roberts 1st Baron Clwyd
- Herbert Roberts c1895

Member of Parliament for Denbighshire West
- In office 1892–1918
- Preceded by: William Cornwallis-West
- Succeeded by: Constituency abolished

Personal details
- Born: 8 August 1863 Liverpool,
- Died: 19 December 1955 (aged 92)
- Party: Liberal Party
- Spouse: Hannah Caine (m. 1893; died 1951)
- Parent: John Roberts (father)
- Relatives: Trevor Roberts (son); Mervyn Roberts (son); Alice Brown Caine (mother-in-law); William Sproston Caine (father-in-law)

Coat of arms of John Roberts, 1st Baron Clwyd
Crest A cock's head erased Gules beaked combed and wattled Sable. Escutcheon Argent three cocks Gules beaked combed wattled and membered Sable. Supporters Dexter a lion guardant party per fess Or and Argent. Sinister an ostrich Argent holding in the beak a horseshoe Proper each gorged with a collar Or pendant therefrom an escutcheon Argent charged with two bars Vert. Motto Virtus in Arduis

Sir Herbert Roberts c1906

John Herbert Roberts, 1st Baron Clwyd (8 August 1863 – 19 December 1955), known as Sir Herbert Roberts, 1st Baronet, from 1903 to 1919, was a Welsh Liberal politician.

Roberts was the son of John Roberts, of Abergele, Denbighshire. He was elected to the House of Commons for Denbighshire West in 1892, a seat he held until 1918. Between 1912 and 1918 he was Chairman of the Welsh Liberal Parliamentary Party. Roberts was created a Baronet, of Brynwenalt of Kilmaron, in 1903 and in 1919 he was raised to the peerage as Baron Clwyd, of Abergele in the County of Denbigh.

Lord Clwyd married Hannah, daughter of William Sproston Caine and Alice Brown Caine, and granddaughter of Hugh Stowell Brown, in 1893. She died in 1951. Clwyd died in December 1955, aged 92, and was succeeded in his titles by his son Trevor Roberts. His brother was the amateur composer Osborne Roberts, who collaborated with William Caine on the comic opera The Island of Pharos (1904). His second son was the composer Mervyn Roberts (1906-1990).

Parliament of the United Kingdom
Preceded by William Cornwallis-West	Member of Parliament for Denbighshire West; 1892 – 1918	Constituency abolished
Peerage of the United Kingdom
New creation	Baron Clwyd; 1919–1955	Succeeded by John Trevor Roberts
Baronetage of the United Kingdom
New creation	Baronet (of Brynwenallt); 1908–1955	Succeeded by John Trevor Roberts
