= Trevor Roberts, 2nd Baron Clwyd =

British peer (1900-1987)

Sir John Trevor Roberts 2nd Baron Clwyd
- Born: 28 November 1900; Abergele, Denbighshire, Wales
- Died: 30 March 1987 (aged 86)
- Education: Gresham's School
- Alma mater: Trinity College, Cambridge
- Occupation: Barrister
- Spouse: Joan de Bois (m. 1932; died 1985)
- Children: 2
- Parents: John Roberts (father); Hannah Caine (mother)
- Relatives: Mervyn Roberts (brother); John Roberts (paternal grandfather); William Sproston Caine (maternal grandfather)

John Trevor Roberts, 2nd Baron Clwyd of Abergele in the County of Denbigh (28 November 1900 – 30 March 1987), also Sir John Trevor Roberts, 2nd Baronet, was a Welsh peer. He was known as Trevor Roberts.

== Background and early life ==
Roberts was the son of John Roberts, 1st Baron Clwyd and of Hannah, Lady Roberts, a daughter of William Sproston Caine MP. He was also the grandson of John Roberts MP, of Abergele, Denbighshire.

He was educated at Gresham's School and Trinity College, Cambridge (BA 1922).

== Career ==
Roberts was admitted a barrister of Gray's Inn in 1930 and served as assistant secretary of commissions in the Lord Chancellor's Department of the House of Lords from 1948 to 1961. He was appointed a JP for London in 1950 and succeeded his father as a member of the House of Lords in 1955. He had houses in London and in Selborne, Hampshire.

== Family ==
In 1932, Roberts married Joan de Bois (died 1985), daughter of Charles R. Murray, of Partickhill, Glasgow, and they had one son, John Anthony Roberts, 3rd Baron Clwyd (born 2 January 1935, died 2006) and one daughter Alison Roberts, (born 24 February 1939). His brother was the composer Mervyn Roberts (1906-1990).

Coat of arms of Trevor Roberts, 2nd Baron Clwyd
Crest A cock's head erased Gules beaked combed and wattled Sable. Escutcheon Argent three cocks Gules beaked combed wattled and membered Sable. Supporters Dexter a lion guardant party per fess Or and Argent. Sinister an ostrich Argent holding in the beak a horseshoe Proper each gorged with a collar Or pendant therefrom an escutcheon Argent charged with two bars Vert. Motto Virtus In Arduis

== Notes ==
Peerage of the United Kingdom
Preceded by John Roberts	Baron Clwyd; 1955–1987	Succeeded by Anthony Roberts
