= Albert Dunn =

British politician (1864–1937)

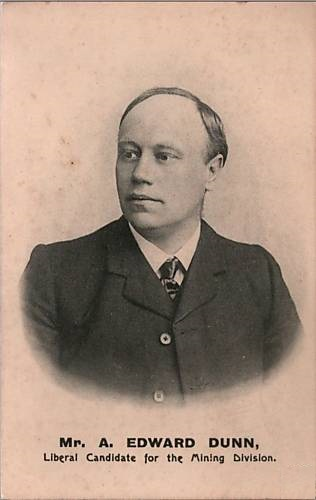

Albert Edward Dunn (13 February 1864 – 2 May 1937) was a radical British Liberal Party politician who served as Mayor of Exeter and as a Member of Parliament.

== Background ==
He was the eldest son of William Henry Dunn JP of Exeter. He was educated at Hallam Hall College, Clevedon in Somerset. He was unmarried.

== Professional career ==
In 1887 he was admitted as a solicitor. In 1892 he was a founding partner in the firm of Dunn & Baker, solicitors of Exeter. He later became a partner for Dunn, Baker & Co. of London. He retired from his legal work to concentrate on his political career. In 1914 on the outbreak of war, he received a commission with the Sportsman's Battalion of the Royal Fusiliers and was responsible for recruiting a company of soldiers from Exeter and the West Country.

== Political career ==
His first venture into politics had been standing as a candidate for election to Exeter City Council, to which he was first elected in 1888. He first stood for election to Parliament at the 1892 general election, when he was unsuccessful in the Conservative-held Exeter constituency. He did not contest the General Elections of 1895 and 1900. Like his father, he served as a Justice of the peace in Exeter. He remained active in local politics in Exeter and served twice as Mayor of Exeter, in 1900-01 and in 1901–02. In 1905 he served as Honorary Town clerk of Exeter. He returned to parliamentary politics for the 1906 general election, when he was elected as Member of Parliament (MP) for the Cornish mining constituency of Camborne. He had held the seat for the Liberal Party with an increased majority despite the presence of a socialist candidate;

General election 1906 Electorate 9,210
Party	Candidate	Votes	%	±%
Liberal	Albert Edward Dunn	4,614	65.0	+9.6
Conservative	Sir Thomas Hewitt	2,384	33.5	−11.1
Social Democratic Federation	John Joseph Jones	109	1.5	n/a
Majority		2,230	31.5	+20.7
Turnout			77.2	+3.0
Liberal hold		Swing	+10.3	

He was re-elected in January 1910, again increasing his majority despite the Liberal Party losing ground across the country;

General election January 1910 Electorate 9,375
Party	Candidate	Votes	%	±%
Liberal	Albert Edward Dunn	5,027	66.0	+1.0
Liberal Unionist	Norman G Chamberlain	2,587	34.0	+0.5
Majority			32.0	+1.0
Turnout			81.2	+4.0
Liberal hold		Swing	+0.5	

He decided not to defend his seat at the December 1910 general election. He stood again at the December 1918 general electionbut this time in the neighbouring constituency of St Ives and not as Liberal, but as a candidate for the Labour Party. His Liberal opponent was supported by the Coalition Government and won;

General election 1918 St Ives Electorate 28,537
Party	Candidate	Votes	%	±%
Liberal	Sir Clifford John Cory	8,659	58.6	+2.6
Labour	Albert Edward Dunn	6,659	38.4	n/a
Ind. Unionist	Thomas Francis Tregoy Mitchell	436	3.0	n/a
Majority		3,000	20.2	+8.2
Turnout		14,754	51.7	−29.0
Liberal hold		Swing	n/a	

He did not contest the 1922 General Election but did contest St Ives again at the 1923 General Election where he finished third;

General election 1923: St Ives Electorate 29,877
Party	Candidate	Votes	%	±%
Liberal	Sir Clifford John Cory	9,922	46.5	+0.0
Unionist	John Anthony Hawke	8,652	40.6	−12.9
Labour	Albert Edward Dunn	2,749	12.9	n/a
Majority		1,270	5.9	12.9
Turnout		21,323	71.4	+5.8
Liberal gain from Unionist		Swing	+6.5	

Parliament of the United Kingdom
Preceded by Sir Wilfrid Lawson	Member of Parliament for Camborne; 1906 – December 1910	Succeeded by Sir Francis Dyke Acland
