= Hugh Stowell Brown =

Manx Christian minister (1823–1886)

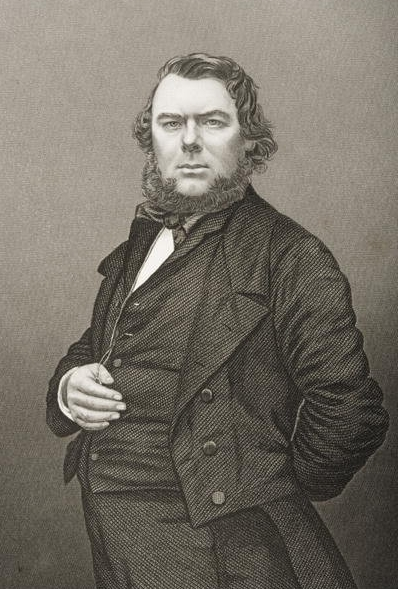
- Born: 10 August 1823; Douglas, Isle of Man
- Died: 24 February 1886 (aged 62); Liverpool, England
- Occupation: Christian minister
- Relatives: Alice Brown Caine (daughter)

Hugh Stowell Brown (10 August 1823 – 24 February 1886) was a Manx Christian minister and renowned preacher.

Hugh Stowell Brown was a preacher, pastor and social reformer in Liverpool in the nineteenth century. His public lectures and work among the poor brought him great renown. On his death a statue was raised to him, one of only three Liverpool clergymen to receive that honour. His brother was the Manx poet Thomas Edward Brown.

== Life ==
He was born at Douglas, Isle of Man, on 10 August 1823, was second son of Robert Brown, and his wife Dorothy (Thomson). Thomas Edward Brown was his younger brother, and he was a cousin of Hugh Stowell. The father, Robert Brown (died 1846), was at one time master of the grammar school in Douglas, and in 1817 became chaplain of St. Matthew's chapel in that town. An evangelical of low-church views, he never read the Athanasian Creed, and took no notice of Ash Wednesday or Lent. In 1832, he became curate of Kirk Braddan, succeeding as vicar on 2 April 1836. He learned Manx in order to preach in it, and supported a family of nine on less than £200 a year. His boys spent the summers in collecting his tithes of hay and corn, intermittently walking five miles to Douglas Grammar School, but Hugh's early education consisted chiefly in reading four or five hours daily to his father, who became almost blind. Robert Brown was found dead by the roadside on 28 November 1846, and buried next day at Kirk Braddan. He wrote twenty-two Sermons on various Subjects, Wellington (Shropshire) and London, 1818, 8vo; and a volume of Poems, principally Sacred, London, 1826.

Hugh was apprenticed when fifteen to a land surveyor, and employed in tithe commutation and ordnance surveys in Cheshire, Shrewsbury, and York. In 1840, he entered the London and Birmingham Railway's works at Wolverton, Buckinghamshire. While earning from four to eight shillings a week he began to study Greek, chalking his first exercises on a fire-box. After three years at Wolverton he returned home and entered King William's College at Castletown to study for the church. When his training was almost complete he felt unable to subscribe to the ordination service, and resolved to return to his trade; but in the meantime was baptised at Stony Stratford, lost his father, and received unexpectedly an invitation to preach at Myrtle Street Baptist Chapel, Liverpool in March 1847. In November 1847, he was accepted by that congregation as their minister. He was then twenty-four. There he remained until his death, winning great popularity as a preacher.

To his Sunday afternoon lectures, established in 1854 in the Concert Hall, Liverpool, Brown drew from two to three thousand working men, whom his own early experiences, added to great power and plainness of speech, with abundant humour, powerfully influenced. He anticipated the Post Office by opening a workman's savings bank, to which over £80,000 was entrusted before it was wound up. In 1871, he visited Canada and the States.

Brown was president in 1878 of the Baptist Union. His addresses (printed in London, 1878) were an appeal for a better educated nonconformist ministry. He thought at one time of retiring from Liverpool to open a hall at Oxford or Cambridge, to be affiliated to one of the colleges. He was in favour of abandoning denominational colleges, the students to take their arts degrees at existing universities. He was an active member of the Baptist Missionary Society, and for many years president of the Liverpool Peace Society and chairman of the Seaman's Friend Association.

Brown died after a few days' illness from apoplexy on 24 February 1886 at 29 Falkner Square, Liverpool, and was buried on 28 February at the Liverpool Necropolis.

== Family ==
Brown married, first, in 1848, Alice Chibnall Sirett, who was the mother of all his children, and died in 1863; secondly, he married Phoebe, sister to Liberal politician William Sproston Caine. She died on 25 March 1884.

== Statue ==
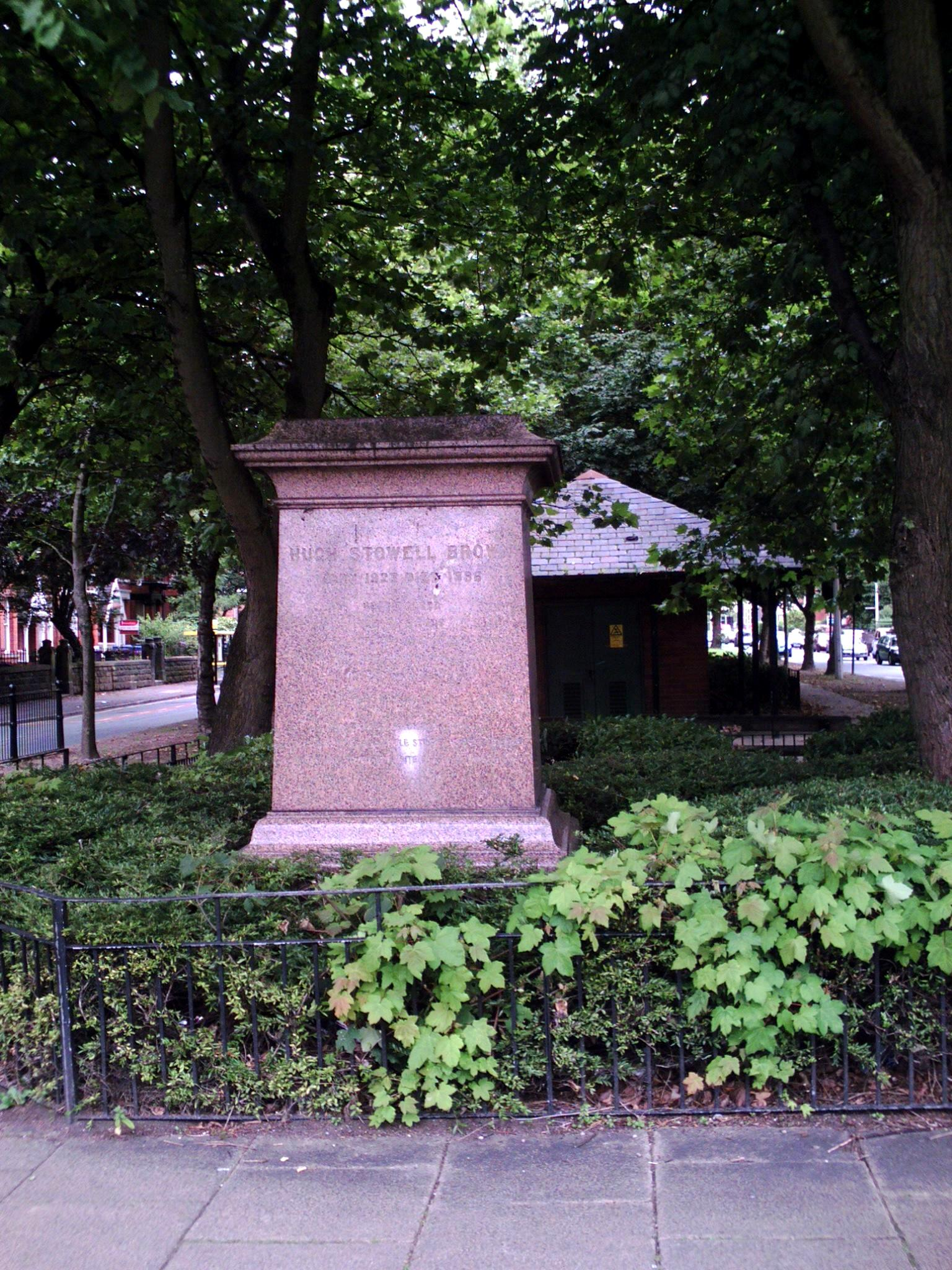
statue pedestal

Soon after his death a statue of Hugh Stowell Brown was paid for by public subscription. The Statue was unveiled on Tuesday 15 October 1889 in the churchyard at the front of Myrtle Street Baptist Church opposite the Philharmonic Hall. In 1939, Myrtle Street church was closed and subsequently demolished, and the site became a car park. The statue was moved to Princes Road/Avenue, close to Princes Park gates, Liverpool on Saturday 25 September 1954. The statue was then removed around the time that of William Huskisson was toppled from its pedestal in 1988. It had suffered extensive damage and lay forlornly in the stable yard at Croxteth Hall in Liverpool until in early 2014.
Then as part of the planning stipulations for the development of student apartments on Hope Street an agreement between the Nordic Construction (the developers) and Liverpool City Council was made to restore the statue and erect it on Hope street at the entrance to the apartments and opposite the Philharmonic pub.
The restoration itself was coordinated via Nick Roberson of Roberson Stone Carving and Stewart Darlow of Nordic Construction to ensure the project was kept as original as possible. The extensive restoration began with cleaning the once white marble. This included removal of lichen, algae and moss and extensive steam cleaning. The hands, foot and sack coat damage were replaced using matching Italian marble and original photographic reference to replicate the lost detail. This left the nose and ears which were restored using marble dust and lime in accordance with current accepted restoration practice.

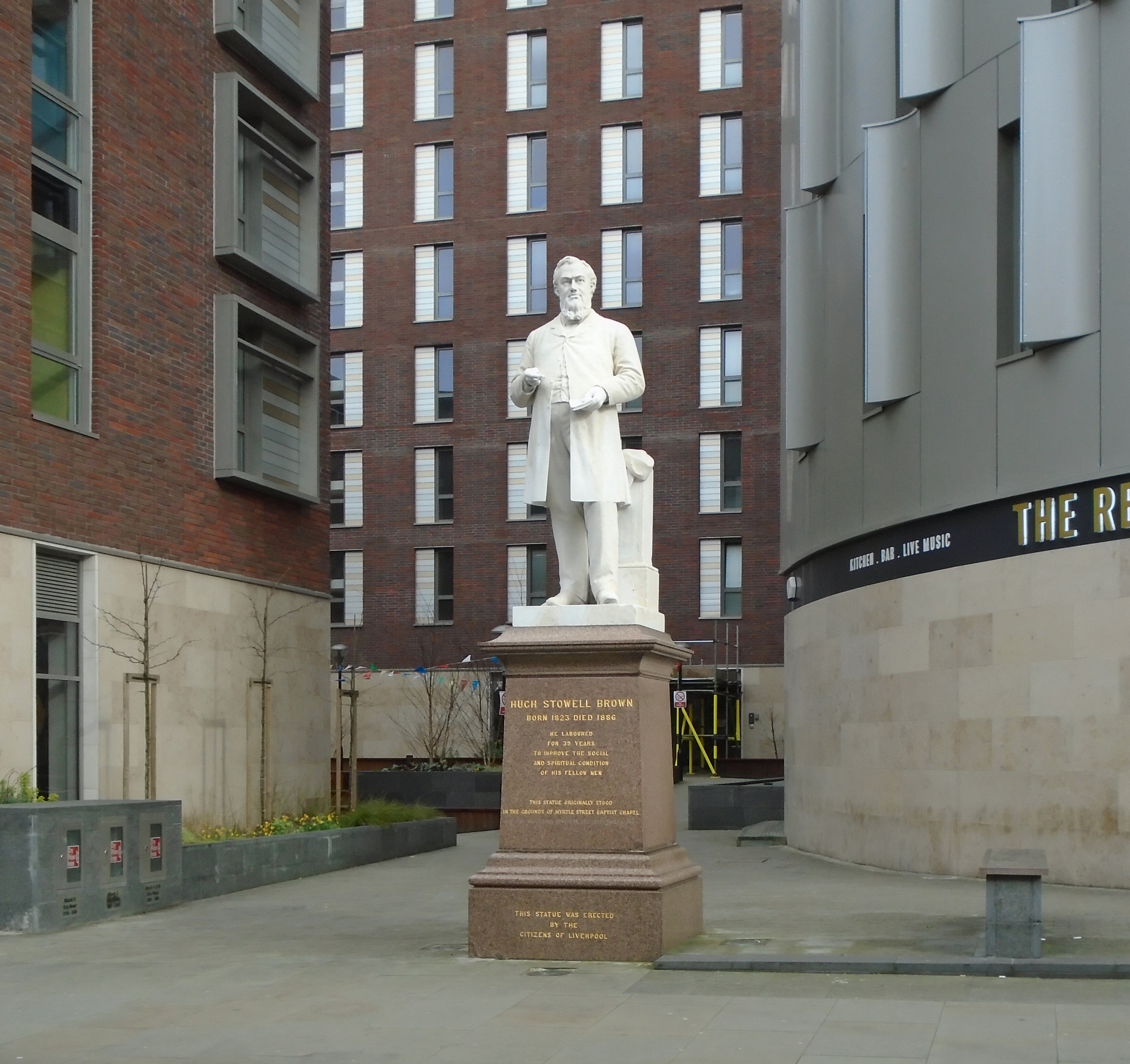
Hope Street Apartments

On 10 September 2015 the 7.5 tonne restored statue and plinth were finally erected not far from their original location on Hope Street.

== Biography ==
A biography of Hugh Stowell Brown was published on 19 September 2019 by Instant Apostle. The book is called A Ready Man and the author is Baptist minister and broadcaster Wayne Clarke.
