= Richard Myddelton (1764–1796) =

Welsh politician

Member of Parliament for Denbigh Boroughs
- In office 1788–1797
- Preceded by: Richard Myddelton
- Succeeded by: Thomas Tyrwhitt Jones

Personal details
- Born: c. 1764
- Died: 20 December 1796 (aged 31–32)
- Relations: Sir John Rushout, 4th Baronet (grandfather); Robert Myddelton Biddulph (nephew); Sir Thomas Myddelton Biddulph (nephew); Frederick Richard West (nephew)
- Parent: Richard Myddelton
- Relatives: Myddelton family
- Education: Eton College

Richard Myddelton (c. 1764 – 20 December 1796), of Chirk Castle, Denbighshire, was a Welsh politician.

== Early life ==
Myddelton was the only son of Richard Myddelton of Chirk Castle and Elizabeth (née Rushout) Myddelton (1730–1772). His younger sister, Charlotte Myddelton, married Robert Biddulph, a banker with Cocks Biddulph. Another sister, Maria Myddelton, who married, as his second wife, Hon. Frederick West (a younger son of John West, 2nd Earl De La Warr).

His maternal grandparents were Lady Anne Compton (the sixth daughter of George Compton, 4th Earl of Northampton) and Sir John Rushout, 4th Baronet of Northwick Park, Gloucestershire. His paternal grandparents were Mary (née Liddell) Myddelton and John Myddelton, MP. His maternal grandfather was Thomas Liddell of Bedford Row, London.

== Career ==
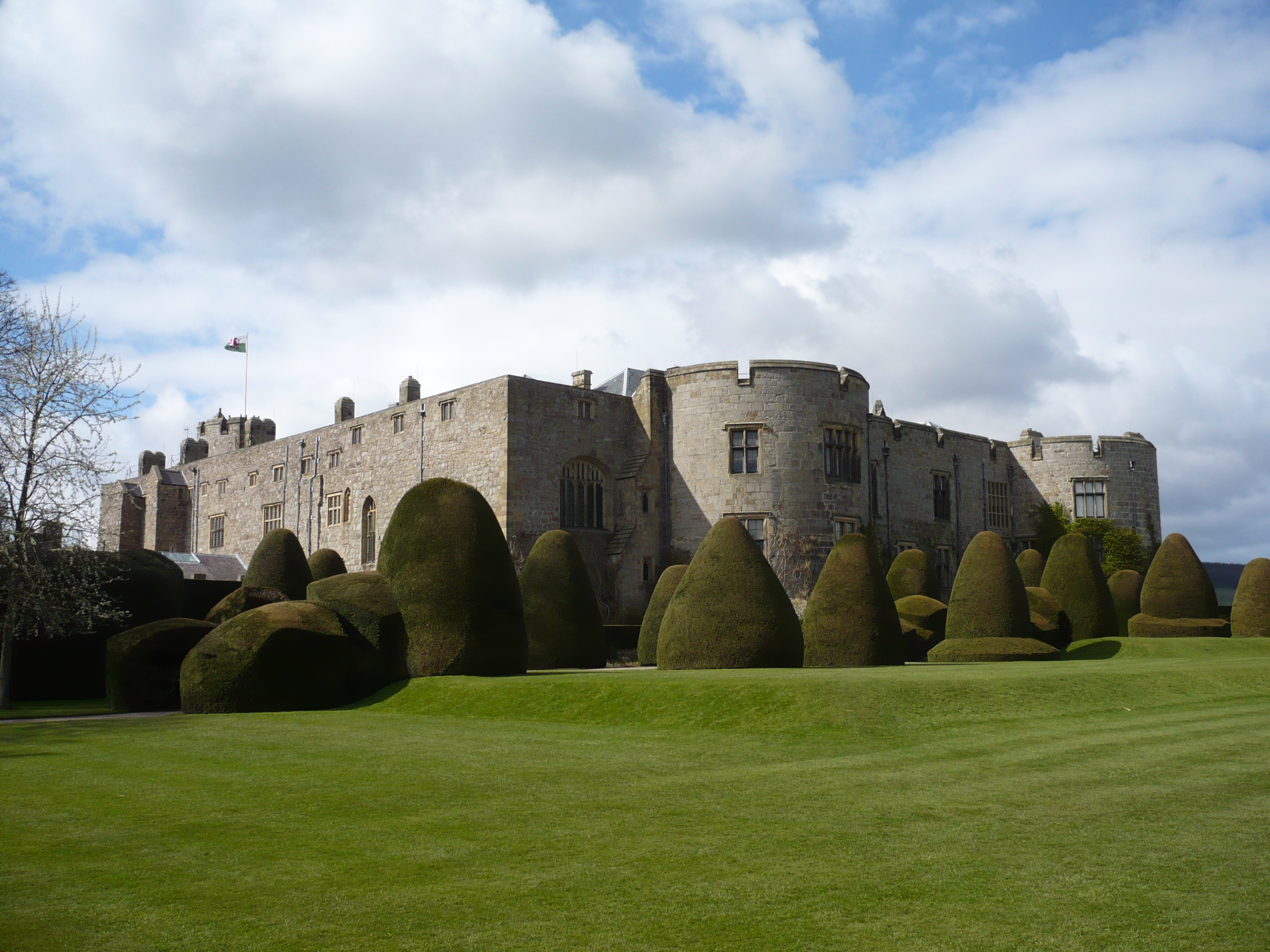
Chirk Castle

Myddelton was educated at Eton College, and matriculated at Christ Church, Oxford in 1781. He succeeded to his father's Welsh estates, including Chirk Castle, in 1795. (Note: Myddelton's great-uncle, Robert Myddelton (1678–1733), succeeded his cousin, Sir William Myddelton, 4th and last Baronet (1694–1718) (son of Sir Richard Myddelton, 3rd Baronet), to Chirk Castle upon the 4th Baronet's death on 5 January 1718. Myddelton's father inherited from his father in 1747.)

He succeeded his father, unopposed, as a Member of Parliament for Denbigh Boroughs in 1788 and, reportedly, never spoke in his first Parliament. He served until his death in 1796 and voted against Pitt on the Regency bill. Upon his death while a sitting MP, he was replaced by Thomas Tyrwhitt Jones in January 1797.

== Personal life ==
He died unmarried on 20 December 1796. Chirk Castle and some local land was inherited by his sister Charlotte, who had married Robert Biddulph and adopted the additional surname of Myddelton. The remaining property was divided between his other two sisters.

Parliament of Great Britain
Preceded by Richard Myddelton	Member of Parliament for Denbigh Boroughs; 1788–1797	Succeeded by Thomas Tyrwhitt Jones
