= Richard Myddelton (1726–1795) =

English politician

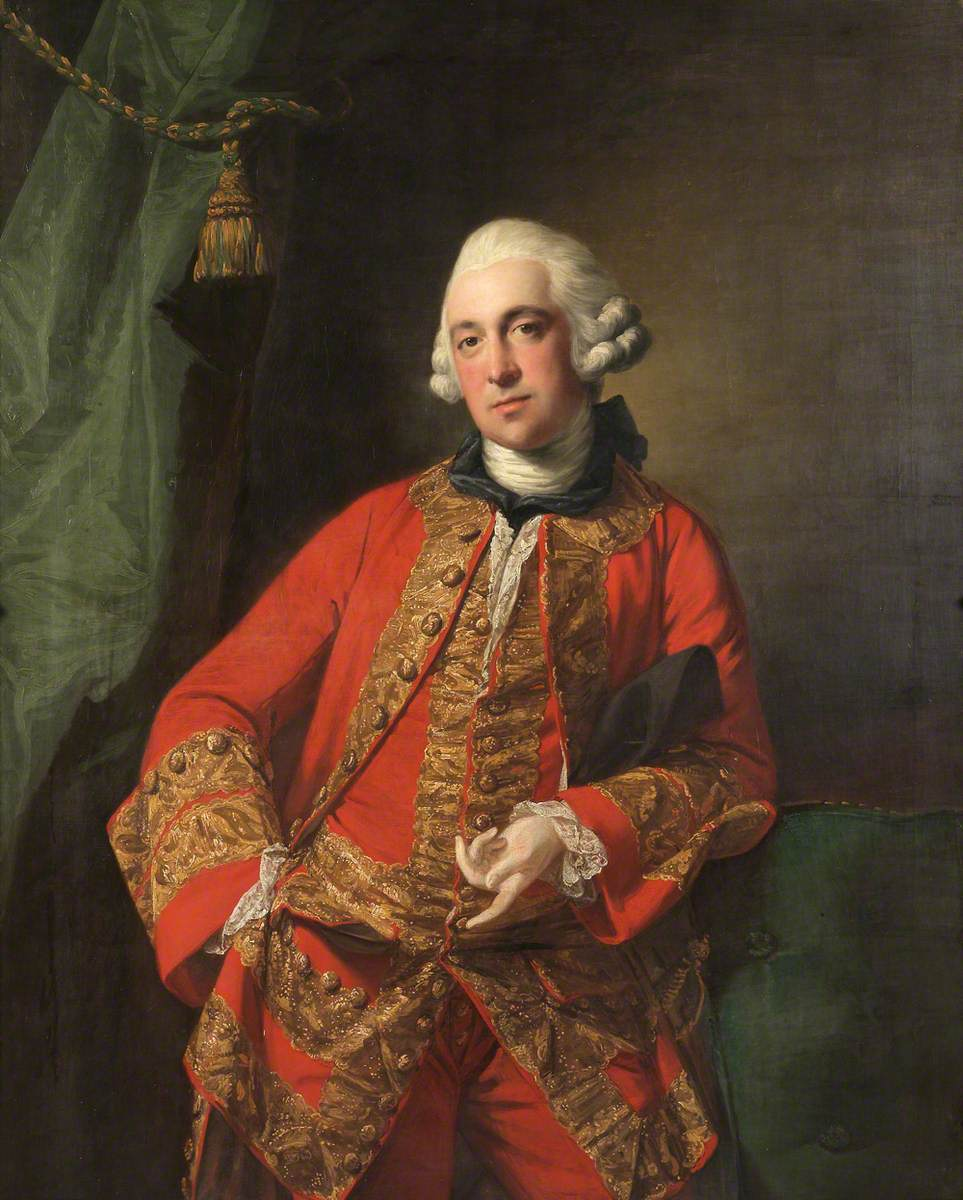
- Portrait of Myddelton, by Francis Cotes, c. 1762

Member of Parliament for Denbigh Boroughs
- In office 1747–1788
- Preceded by: John Wynn
- Succeeded by: Richard Myddelton II

Personal details
- Born: 26 March 1726
- Died: March 1795 (aged 68–69)
- Spouses: Elizabeth Rushout (m. 1761; died 1772) Mary Lloyd (m. 1788; died 1788) Euphemia Crawford (m. 1789)
- Relations: Robert Myddelton (uncle); Robert Myddelton Biddulph (grandson); Sir Thomas Myddelton Biddulph (grandson); Frederick Richard West (grandson)
- Children: 5, including Richard
- Parent: John Myddelton
- Education: Eton School
- Alma mater: St John's College, Oxford

Richard Myddelton (26 March 1726 – March 1795), of Chirk Castle, Denbighshire, was a Welsh landowner and politician.

== Early life ==
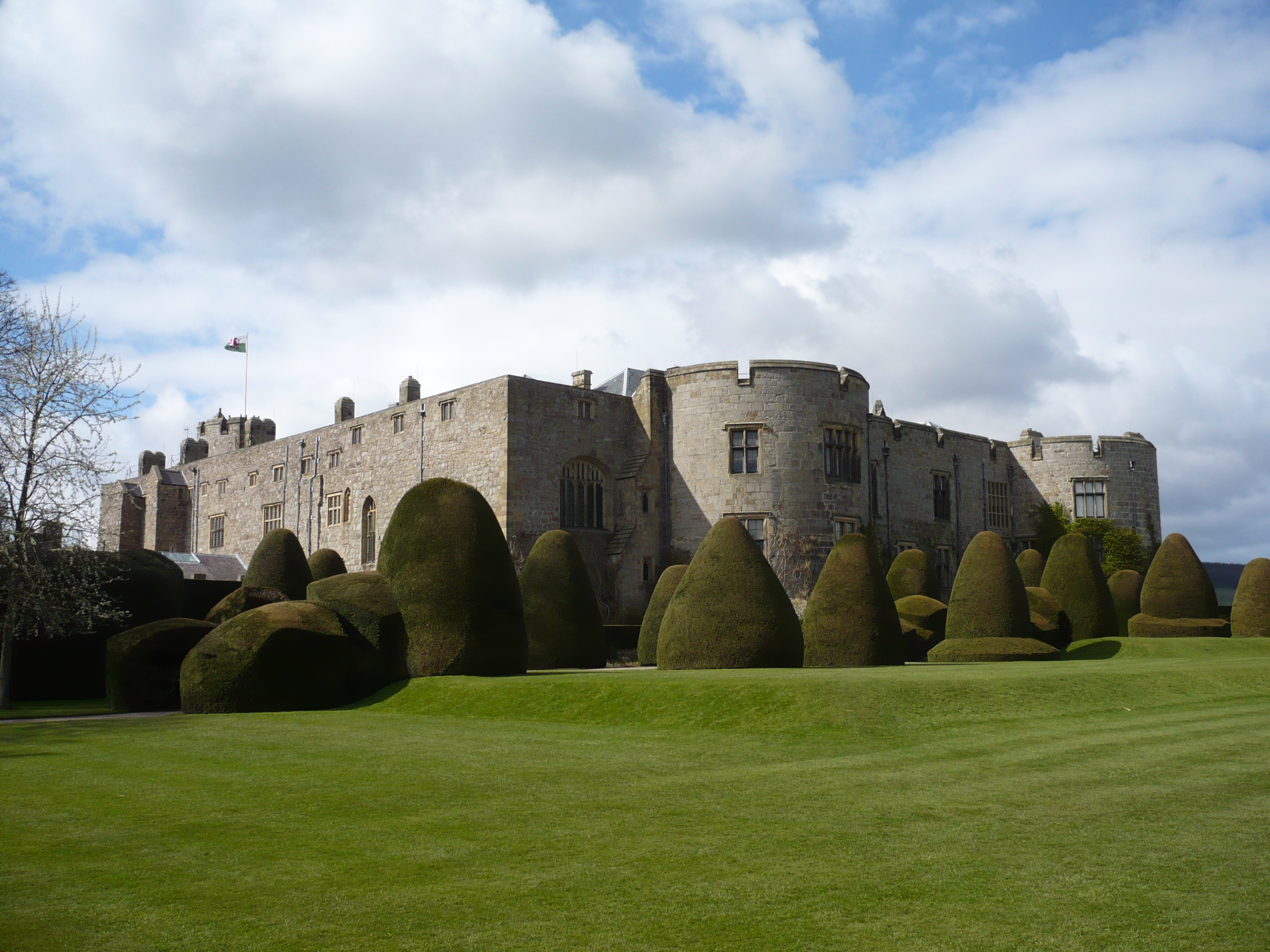
Chirk Castle

He was the eldest son of two sons and two daughters born to Mary (née Liddell) Myddelton and John Myddelton, MP of Chirk Castle, Denbighshire. His father, the younger son of Richard Myddelton of Shrewsbury, inherited his father's estates, including Chirk Castle, (Note: Richard Myddelton's uncle, Robert Myddelton (1678–1733), succeeded his cousin, Sir William Myddelton, 4th and last Baronet (1694–1718) (son of Sir Richard Myddelton, 3rd Baronet), to Chirk Castle upon the 4th Baronet's death on 5 January 1718.) when his elder brother Robert died young and without issue in 1733. His maternal grandfather was Thomas Liddell of Bedford Row, London.

He was educated at Eton School from 1739 to 1743, and matriculated at St John's College, Oxford in 1744. He succeeded to his father's Welsh estates, including Chirk Castle, in 1747.

== Career ==
He was a Member of Parliament (MP) for Denbigh Boroughs from 1747 to 1788. He also acted as Lord Lieutenant of Denbighshire from 1748 to his death and as custos rotulorum of Denbighshire from 1749 to death. As Lord Lieutenant he took personal command of the Denbighshire Militia for the first two years after it was reformed in 1760. Other position held by Myddelton included steward of the lordship of Denbigh from 1748 to death, steward of the Lordship of Bromfield and Yale from 1749 to death and Recorder of Denbigh from 1749 to death.

== Personal life ==
Myddelton was thrice married. On 14 March 1761, he married Elizabeth Rushout (1730–1772), the daughter of Lady Anne Compton (the sixth daughter of George Compton, 4th Earl of Northampton) and Sir John Rushout, 4th Baronet of Northwick Park, Gloucestershire. Before her death on 7 November 1772, they were the parents of one son and three daughters, including:

- Richard Myddelton (1764–1796), who succeeded his father as MP for Denbigh Boroughs.
- Charlotte Myddelton (1770–1843), who married Robert Biddulph, a banker with Cocks Biddulph, in 1801.
- Maria Myddelton (c. 1772–1843), who married, as his second wife, Hon. Frederick West, son of John West, 2nd Earl De La Warr, in 1798.

Myddelton married, secondly, Mary Lloyd, in 1778. Before her death on 14 March 1788, they were the parents of another daughter:

- Harriet Myddelton, who died unmarried.

After the death of his second wife, he married Euphemia Crawford of Pall Mall, on 12 March 1789.

He died in 1795 and his estates passed to his only son, Richard. Upon his unmarried son's death the following year on 20 December 1796, Chirk Castle and some local land was inherited by his daughter Charlotte, who had married Robert Biddulph. The remaining property was divided between Myddelton's other two daughters.

=== Descendants ===
Through his daughter Charlotte, he was a grandfather of Robert Myddelton Biddulph, MP for Denbigh Boroughs and Denbighshire, and Gen. Sir Thomas Myddelton Biddulph, Keeper of the Privy Purse.

Through his daughter Maria, he was a grandfather of Frederick Richard West, MP in Denbighshire who married Lady Georgiana Stanhope (a daughter of Philip Stanhope, 5th Earl of Chesterfield and Lady Henrietta Thynne, third daughter of Thomas Thynne, 1st Marquess of Bath), in 1820. After her death, he married, secondly, Theresa Whitby (daughter of Capt. John Whitby and Mary Anne Symonds).

Parliament of Great Britain
| Preceded by John Wynn | Member of Parliament for Denbigh Boroughs; 1747–1788 | Succeeded by Richard Myddelton II |
