= Thomas Myddelton Biddulph =

General The Right Honourable Sir Thomas Myddelton Biddulph KCB
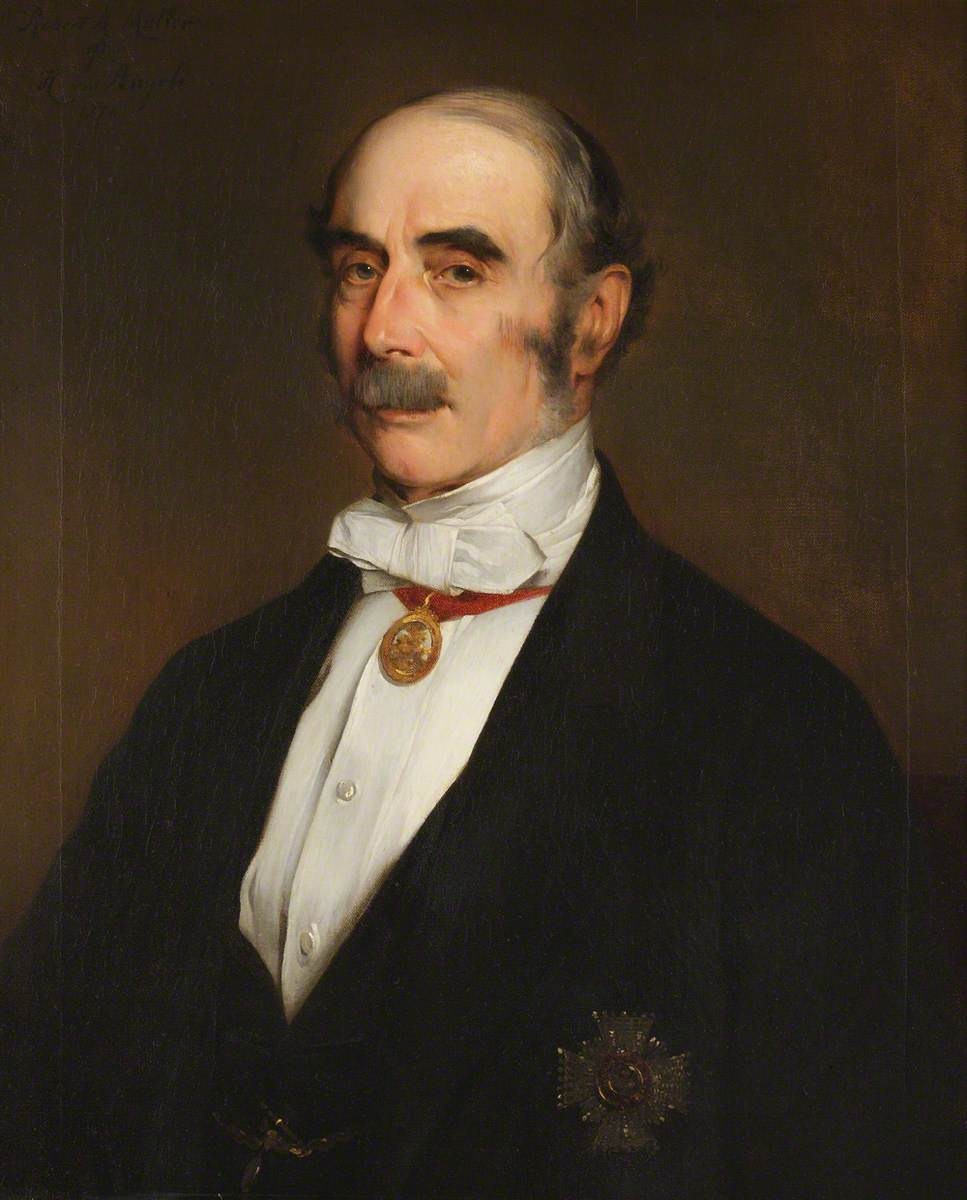
- Portrait by Robert Antoine Muller

Keeper of the Privy Purse
- In office 1866–1878 Serving with Sir Charles Grey
- Preceded by: Sir Charles Beaumont Phipps
- Succeeded by: Sir Henry Ponsonby

Personal details
- Born: 29 July 1809
- Died: 28 September 1878 (aged 69) Mains of Abergeldie
- Spouse: Mary Frederica Seymour (m. 1857)
- Relations: Robert Myddelton Biddulph (brother); Richard Myddelton (grandfather); Richard Myddelton (uncle)
- Children: 2
- Parent(s): Robert Myddelton Biddulph; Charlotte Myddelton
- Education: Eton College

Sir Thomas Myddelton Biddulph KCB PC (29 July 1809 – 28 September 1878) was an officer in the British Army and courtier.

== Early life ==
Thomas was born on 29 July 1809. He was the second son of Charlotte Myddelton and Robert Myddelton Biddulph (1761–1814) of Ledbury and younger brother of Robert Myddelton Biddulph, MP for Denbighshire. His father adopted, by royal licence, the additional surname of Myddelton in 1801 after his mother inherited Chirk Castle from her unmarried brother Richard Myddelton in 1796.

His paternal grandparents were Penelope (née Dandridge) Biddulph and barrister Michael Biddulph. His maternal grandparents were Richard Myddelton and, his first wife, Elizabeth Rushout (the daughter of Lady Anne Compton and Sir John Rushout, 4th Baronet). An aunt, Maria Myddelton, was the second wife of Hon. Frederick West (a younger son of John West, 2nd Earl De La Warr)

He was educated at Eton College.

== Career ==
Biddulph entered the Army with the purchase of a commission as cornet and sub-lieutenant in the 1st Regiment of Life Guards on 7 October 1826. He purchased further promotion to lieutenant on 23 February 1829 and captain on 16 May 1834. In 1837 and 1841 his brother Robert unsuccessfully tried to have him elected as Member of Parliament for the Denbigh Boroughs. Biddulph was granted brevet rank as a major on 9 November 1846.

On 16 July 1851, Biddulph was appointed Master of the Household to Queen Victoria, an office for which he had been selected by Baron Stockmar. On 31 October that year, he purchased the substantive rank of major in the 7th Light Dragoons, and then the rank of lieutenant-colonel on the unattached list the same day. He was made an Extra Equerry to the Queen on 16 July 1854 and promoted to brevet colonel on 29 January 1857, with seniority later antedated to 28 November 1854.

On 10 March 1863, it was announced that Biddulph would be made a Knight Commander of the Civil Division of the Order of the Bath; he received the knighthood on 27 March. He was promoted to major-general on 31 May 1865. On 3 March 1866, he resigned as Master of the Household and was appointed joint Keeper of the Privy Purse with Lieutenant-General Charles Grey. He was also appointed Receiver-General of the Duchy of Cornwall on 31 March that year. After Grey's appointment as Private Secretary to the Sovereign on 30 April 1867, Biddulph became sole Keeper of the Privy Purse. He was further appointed Receiver-General of the Duchy of Lancaster in 1873, and would hold all three offices to his death. He was promoted to lieutenant-general on 29 December 1873 and full general on 1 October 1877, and on 22 December 1877 was sworn of the Privy Council.

== Personal life ==
On 16 February 1857, Biddulph married Mary Frederica Seymour (1824–1902), one of the Queen's maids of honour, the daughter of Frederick Charles William Seymour. Her paternal grandparents were Vice-Admiral Lord Hugh Seymour and Lady Mary Gordon (herself the daughter of George Gordon, 9th Marquess of Huntly). Biddulph's wife had been maid of honour 1850–1857, and kept the style the Honourable for the rest of her life. She later served as an honorary Woman of the Bedchamber to the Queen, and as a Lady-in-waiting to her daughter Princess Henry of Battenberg. They had one son and one daughter:

- Frederica Myddelton Biddulph (1864-1947)
- Victor Myddelton Biddulph (1860–1919)

General Sir Thomas Myddelton Biddulph died at the Mains of Abergeldie, near Balmoral, after a short illness during which Queen Victoria visited him daily. He was buried at Clewer. Hon. Lady Biddulph was granted the use of rooms at the Henry III's Tower at Windsor Castle, where she died on 23 October 1902. King Edward VII and other members of the royal family visited her in the days before her death.

Court offices
Preceded by Sir Charles Beaumont Phipps	Keeper of the Privy Purse; 1866–1878; With: Sir Charles Grey 1866-67	Succeeded by Sir Henry Ponsonby
