= Robert Biddulph =

Robert Biddulph may refer to:

- Rob Biddulph (born 1972), British children's author and illustrator
- Robert Biddulph (MP) (1801–1864), British MP
- Robert Biddulph (British Army officer) (1835–1918), British general and Governor of Gibraltar, son of the above
- Robert Myddelton Biddulph (1761–1814), MP for Herefordshire and Denbigh Boroughs
- Robert Myddelton Biddulph (1805–1872), MP for Denbighshire and Lord Lieutenant of Denbighshire; son of the above
