= Royal Denbigh Rifles =

Auxiliary unit of the British Army

Denbighshire Militia Royal Denbigh Rifles 3rd (Reserve) Battalion, Royal Welsh Fusiliers
- Active: 1662–1 April 1953
- Country: England (1662–1707); Kingdom of Great Britain (1707–1800); United Kingdom (1801–1953)
- Branch: Militia/Special Reserve
- Role: Infantry
- Size: 1 Battalion
- Garrison/HQ: Wrexham
- Motto: 'Y Ddraig Goch a Ddyry Gychwyn' ('The Red Dragon creates an impetus').
- Mascot: A white goat

Commanders
- Notable commanders: Sir Watkin Williams-Wynn, 5th Baronet

The Denbighshire Militia, later the Royal Denbighshire Rifles was an auxiliary (Note: It is incorrect to describe the British Militia as 'irregular': throughout their history they were equipped and trained exactly like the line regiments of the regular army, and once embodied in time of war they were fulltime professional soldiers for the duration of their enlistment.) regiment reorganised in the Welsh county of Denbighshire during the 18th Century from earlier precursor units. Primarily intended for home defence, it provided a contingent for service in France in the closing stages of the Napoleonic War. After a series of short-lived mergers with other Welsh militia regiments it became part of the Royal Welsh Fusiliers, It served as a Special Reserve training unit in World War I. After 1921 the militia had only a shadowy existence until its final abolition in 1953.

== Denbigh Trained Bands ==
The universal obligation to military service in the Shire levy was long established in England and was extended to Wales. King Henry VIII called a 'Great Muster' in 1539, and the muster book compiled by John Salesbury, Steward of 'Denbighland', showed 2022 men available for service, of whom 901 were unarmoured foot soldiers, 241 were bowmen and 880 were billmen. Of these, 511 had 'thick coats' and 97 had Sallet helmets or 'skoles' (iron skullcaps), but the only men with 'harness' or armour were the 24 billmen of the steward's own household.

The legal basis of the militia was updated by two acts of 1557 covering musters (4 & 5 Ph. & M. c. 3) and the maintenance of horses and armour (4 & 5 Ph. & M. c. 2). The county militia was now under the Lord Lieutenant, assisted by the Deputy Lieutenants and Justices of the Peace (JPs). The entry into force of these Acts in 1558 is seen as the starting date for the organised Militia of England and Wales. Although the militia obligation was universal, it was clearly impractical to train and equip every able-bodied man, so after 1572 the practice was to select a proportion of men for the Trained Bands, who were mustered for regular training. During the Armada crisis of 1588, from its 1200 able-bodied men Denbighshire furnished 400 trained foot and 200 untrained 'pioneers', together with 30 light horse and 30 'petronel's (the petronel was an early cavalry firearm).

In the 16th Century little distinction was made between the militia and the troops levied by the counties for overseas expeditions. However, the counties usually conscripted the unemployed and criminals rather than the Trained Bandsmen. Between 1585 and 1602 Denbighshire supplied 980 men for service in Ireland, and a further 75 for France. The men were given three days' 'conduct money' to get to Chester, the main port of embarkation for Ireland. Conduct money was recovered from the government, but replacing the weapons issued to the levies from the militia armouries was a heavy cost on the counties.

With the passing of the threat of invasion, the trained bands declined in the early 17th Century. Later, King Charles I attempted to reform them into a national force or 'Perfect Militia' answering to the king rather than local control. In 1638 the Denbigh Trained Band under Colonel William Wynne consisted of 239 musketeers and 161 pikemen, with 50 men in the Denbigh Trained Band Horse. In 1640 the county was ordered to send a detachment of 200 men to Newcastle upon Tyne to take part in the Second Bishops' War.

=== Civil War ===
Control of the militia was one of the areas of dispute between Charles I and Parliament that led to the English Civil War. When open war broke out between the King and Parliament, neither side made much use of the trained bands beyond securing the county armouries for their own full-time troops. Most of Wales was under Royalist control for much of the war, and was a recruiting ground for the King's armies. In August 1642 Colonel Sir Thomas Salusbury, 2nd Baronet of Lleweni, raised a Royalist foot regiment mainly from Denbighshire and Flintshire, which served throughout the war from the Battle of Edgehill until the final surrender in 1646. In January 1643 Col William Wynne raised a Royalist foot regiment of four (later five) companies and a troop of horse, from Denbigh, Langernew, Ruthin and Llangollen (largely from his own Denbigh Trained Band, it appears) that served in Lord Capel's force and in the Chester garrison. It saw action at a number of skirmishes, including one at Wem in October 1643 where Col Wynne was killed and was succeeded in command by his lieutenant-colonel Hugh Wynne. The regiment was besieged at Oswestry in June 1644, was at the Battle of Rowton Heath in September 1645 and the Siege of Chester that ended in February 1646. The regiment was besieged in Denbigh Castle from April 1646 and finally surrendered on 14 October.

== Denbighshire Militia ==
After the Restoration of the Monarchy, the Militia was re-established by the Militia Act 1661 under the control of the king's lords lieutenant, the men to be selected by ballot. This was popularly seen as the 'Constitutional Force' to counterbalance a 'Standing Army' tainted by association with the New Model Army that had supported Cromwell's military dictatorship.

The militia forces in the Welsh counties were small, and were grouped together under the command of the Lord President of the Council of Wales. In 1665 the Denbighshire Militia was commanded by Col John Robinson, with Captain John Salusbury commanding a Troop of Denbighshire Horse Militia. As Lord President, the Duke of Beaufort carried out a tour of inspection of the Welsh militia in 1684, when the Denbighshire contingent consisted of one troop of horse and five foot companies commanded by Sir Richard Myddelton, 3rd Baronet of Chirk Castle. In 1697 it consisted of 500 foot under Major-General the Earl of Macclesfield (Lord Lieutenant of Denbighshire) and 62 horse under Capt John Doulton.

Generally the militia declined in the long peace after the Treaty of Utrecht in 1713. Jacobites were numerous amongst the Welsh Militia, but they did not show their hands during the Risings of 1715 and 1745, and bloodshed was avoided.

== 1757 reforms ==
Under threat of French invasion during the Seven Years' War a series of Militia Acts from 1757 re-established county militia regiments, the men being conscripted by means of parish ballots (paid substitutes were permitted) to serve for three years. There was a property qualification for officers, who were commissioned by the lord lieutenant. An adjutant and drill sergeants were to be provided to each regiment from the Regular Army, and arms and accoutrements would be supplied when the county had secured 60 per cent of its quota of recruits.

Denbighshire was given a quota of 280 men to raise, but recruitment throughout Wales was slow. The problem was less with the other ranks raised by ballot than the shortage of men qualified to be officers, even after the requirements were lowered for Welsh counties. Richard Myddleton of Chirk Castle, Lord Lieutenant of Denbighshire, took command of the regiment himself and its arms and Regimental Colours were finally issued to it at Wrexham on 8 May 1760. It was organised into five companies and was embodied for fulltime service on 17 July 1760.

Shortly after embodiment the regiment was sent to North Devon where it established regimental headquarters (HQ) at Barnstaple. The main duty was to guard prisoners of war and to escort parties of them from Barnstaple to Plymouth. In October 1761 the regiment moved the short distance to relieve the East Devon Militia at Bideford where the duties were similar. Early the following month the regiment marched to Shrewsbury in Shropshire where it probably stayed for the remainder of its embodied service. In January 1763 it marched back to Wrexham to be disembodied.

In peacetime the adjutant, sergeants and drummers of the disembodied regiment maintained the militia store and armoury in Wrexham Town Hall at the top of the High Street. Training was sporadic and usually by isolated companies rather than the whole regiment, but the numbers were maintained by periodic enforcement of the ballot. Conscription by means of the ballot was unpopular even in peacetime, and Denbighshire suffered anti-militia riots in 1769.

=== War of American Independence ===
The militia were called out on 26 March 1778 during the War of American Independence, when the country was threatened with invasion by the Americans' allies, France and Spain. Having assembled at Wrexham under the command of John Myddleton of Gwaenynog, the Denbighshires marched off to garrison Cockermouth in Cumberland. An anonymous letter of December 1778 reported that in the Denbighshires the major had been absent from June, the colonel since September, one captain had never joined while the other, who had never been away more than two weeks, was a Member of Parliament and now had to attend its sitting. Nevertheless, the other officers and the drill sergeants must have made progress: next year an inspecting officer commented that the Denbighshires were fine men and quite proficient, although they had had little chance to train together. The pauses between the movements in the manual exercise were too long, a fault that the commanding officer promised to correct.

During the American war a number of counties raised additional volunteer companies for their militia regiments, manned by men enlisted for a cash bounty. There is evidence that Denbighshire formed one such company, paid for by patriotic subscription.

In January 1779 the regiment had two companies detached to Workington and in May two were detached to Whitehaven (which had been raided by John Paul Jones the previous year) and one to Maryport. By July the regiment had marched to Chester where it stayed until mid-August. In September the regiment visited its home county, with companies stationed in Wrexham, Denbigh and Ruthin (perhaps in connection with recruitment) and then returned to the Chester garrison by the beginning of October. In late 1779 there were machine-breaking riots in Lancashire and the Denbighshire Militia sent three companies from Chester to Liverpool to assist Sir George Savile's West Riding Regiment that was hard-pressed to send detachments to deal with riots at Wigan, Chorley and other towns as well as to carry out its primary duty of guarding large numbers of prisoners of war.

Nine officers and 43 other ranks claimed leave to go home to vote in the 1780 general election. By March 1781 the whole regiment was back in Denbighshire, with companies stationed in Denbigh, Ruthin and Llanrwst. Shortly afterwards it was sent to Sussex, and spent some time at Warley Camp in Essex. It continued serving in South East England until the Treaty of Paris was signed in 1783 and orders were issued on 28 February to disembody the militia. The regiment was already marching back to North Wales, and on arrival at Wrexham it was promptly paid off.

From 1784 to 1792 the militia were assembled for their 28 days' annual peacetime training, but to save money only two-thirds of the men were actually mustered each year.

=== French Revolutionary and Napoleonic Wars ===
Revolutionary France declared war on Britain on 1 February 1793. The Denbighshire Militia were embodied shortly afterwards, still under the command of John Myddleton, and once again were sent to Cumberland, to garrison Whitehaven until November.

The French Revolutionary War and Napoleonic Wars saw a new phase for the English militia: they were embodied for a whole generation, and became regiments of full-time professional soldiers (though restricted to service in the British Isles), which the regular army increasingly saw as a prime source of recruits. They served in coast defences, manning garrisons, guarding prisoners of war, and for internal security, while their traditional local defence duties were taken over by the Volunteers and mounted Yeomanry.

The Denbighshire marched south in November 1793, being stationed in Oxfordshire and Berkshire over the winter, moving to Hampshire in the spring. From 1 April it was at Andover with detachments at Salisbury and Winchester, and was joined on 24 June by two newly raised volunteer companies (147 men) whose clothing, equipment and bounties had been paid for by patriotic subscription.

By 14 July 1794 the regiment was at Porchester with the Dorset Militia where the two regiments guarded French prisoners of war. One dark night a sentry of the Dorsets saw what he thought was an apparition of a white devil's face with horns and a beard. He challenged the apparition and when it did not reply he fired his musket at it, to find himself being charged by the Denbighshire's white goat mascot. Hearing the shot, the guard turned out and the goat put them to flight as well before returning to the Denbighshire drum major's quarters.

From Porchester the Denbighshires were moved to nearby Fareham by November 1794, then to Greenwich by mid-December. Early in 1795 the regiment was at Tunbridge Wells in Kent, then spent the summer months moving around the south-eastern counties of England before going into winter quarters back in Hampshire at Gosport.

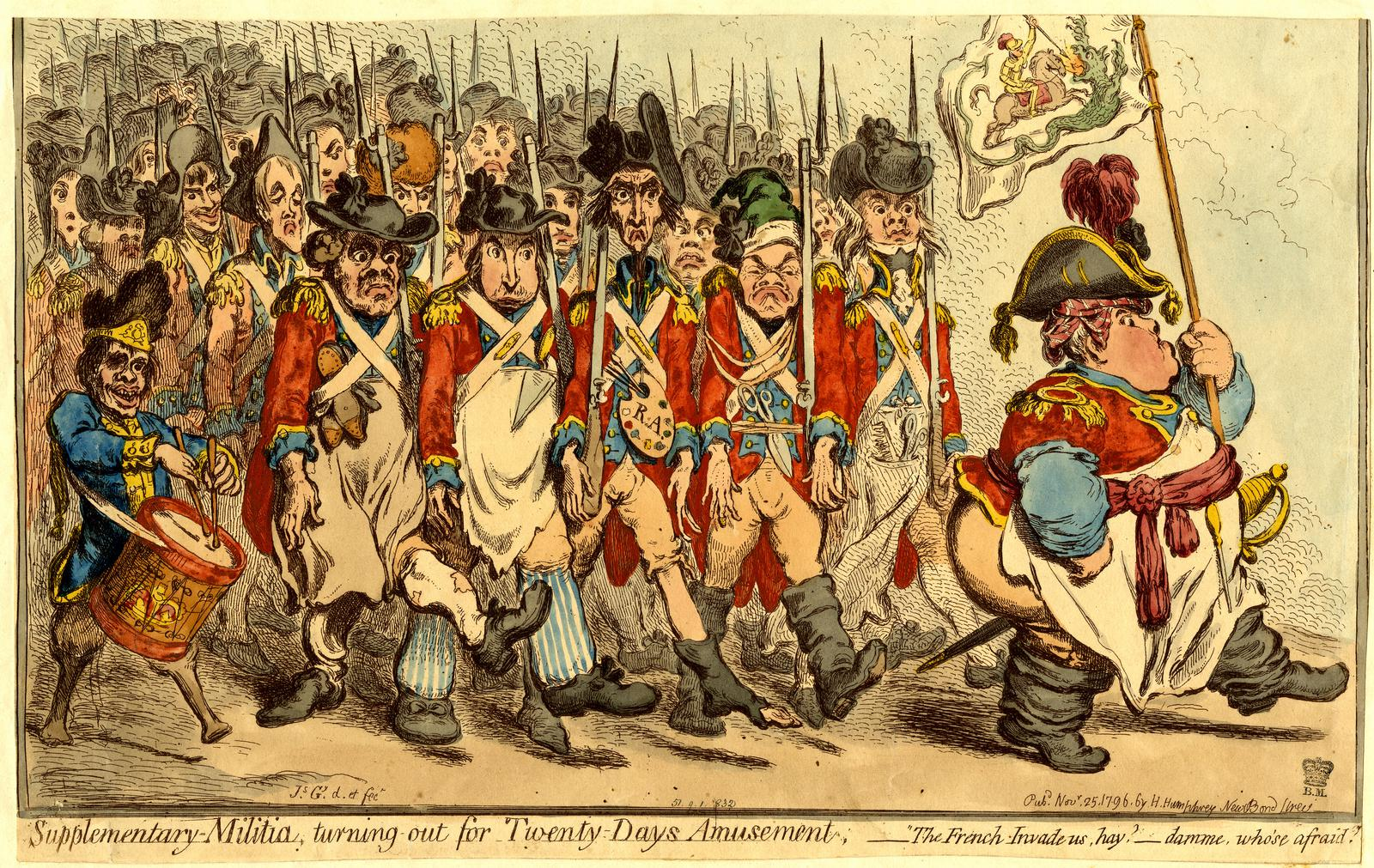
Supplementary-Militia, turning-out for Twenty Days Amusement: 1796 caricature by James Gillray.

In 1796, in a fresh attempt to have as many men as possible under arms for home defence in order to release regulars, the Government created the Supplementary Militia, a compulsory levy of men to be trained in their spare time, and to be incorporated into the Regular Militia as required. Denbighshire's additional quota was fixed at 420 men, and a team from the embodied regiment went to Wrexham to train the supplementaries before they marched to join the regiment.

In March 1796 the regiment marched back to Kent and was stationed at various towns before moving into the Dover garrison in May, where the first batch of 70 supplementary militiamen joined the regiment. Between June 1796 and July 1799 the regiment was moved around Kent and Sussex. On 8 July 1798 a general order was issued to form temporary battalions from the flank companies (Grenadier and Light companies) of militia regiments in the Southern District. The Grenadier Company of the Denbighshires joined those of the Bedfordshire, Derbyshire, Glamorgan, Middlesex and Northamptonshire Militia in the 3rd Grenadier Battalion at Shoreham-by-Sea, commanded by Lt-Col Payne of the Bedfordshires.

In the summer of 1798 the Irish Rebellion became serious, and the French were sending help to the rebels. An Act authorising the deployment of British militia units in Ireland was passed and the Denbighshires were among six Welsh regiments that volunteered for this service. It served there under Col Sir Watkin Williams-Wynn, 5th Baronet, MP. In December 1799 the regiment returned to the Portsmouth defences. A year later it moved on to Devon, first to Honiton in November and then to Ottery St Mary for winter quarters, with detachments in the surrounding villages.

The Treaty of Amiens brought an end to hostilities and the Denbighshire Militia were marched back to Wrexham in December 1801 for disembodiment. However, the peace proved short-lived, and the militia had already been called out again when Britain declared war in May 1803. There had been some consolidation of Militia legislation, and the Lord Lieutenant of Denbighshire (and Colonel of the Denbighshire Militia) Sir Watkin Williams-Wynn, proposed that the small Denbighshire and Merionethshire contingents should be combined to support a full-size regiment: the proposal was rejected at this time. Under the command of Lt-Col R. Williams-Wynn the Denbighshires marched to its war station at Woolwich, where it remained until June 1805, training on Plumstead Common. The Supplementary Militia ballot was again enforced in Denbighshire and the reinforcements sent to join the regiment. Militiamen who volunteered for the regulars also had to be replaced by means of the ballot. In April 1804 the regiment was one of 12 Welsh militia regiments awarded the prefix 'Royal'.

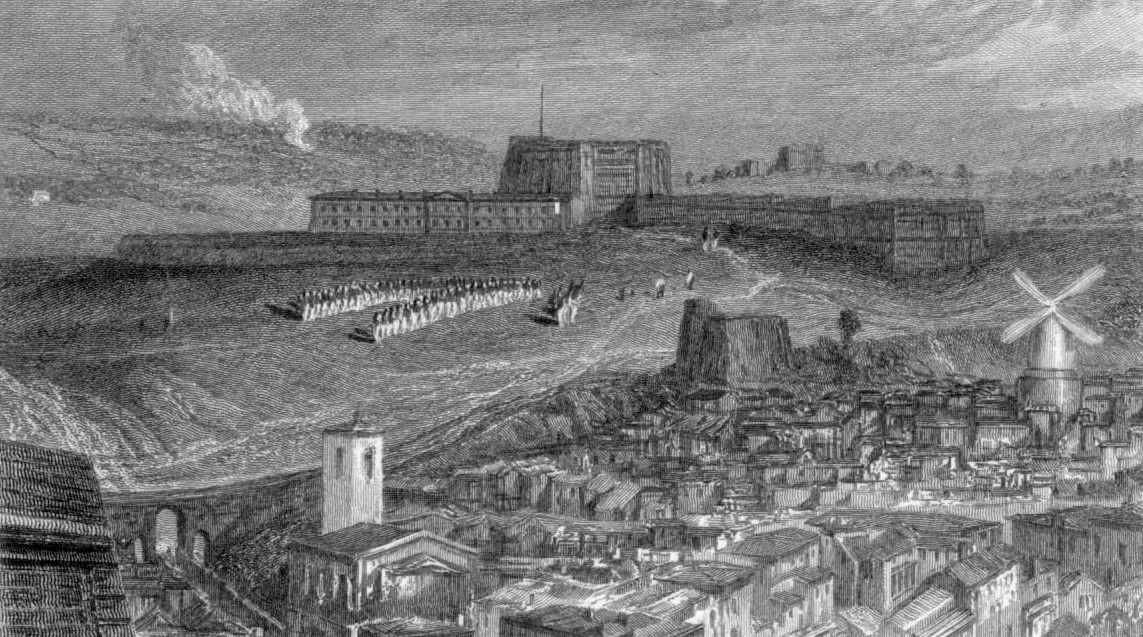
Fort Pitt, Chatham, seen from Fort Amherst.

During the summer of 1805, when Napoleon was massing his 'Army of England' at Boulogne for a projected invasion, the regiment was again in garrison at Dover, this time stationed in the Castle with the Hertfordshire Militia. By 1 September the regiment, with 348 men in 5 companies, under Lt-Col John Lloyd Salusbury, was stationed with the Fifeshire Militia at Chatham Camp in Kent, forming part of Maj-Gen the Hon Edward Finch's Brigade of Guards. The following summer it was at the newly built Fort Pitt at Chatham, then between August 1806 and July 1808 it moved around Kent, with a spell back at Fort Pitt between March and May 1807. It returned to Fort Pitt again in July 1808 and remained there until 1811. In 1809 the regiment was converted to Light Infantry: apart from the title, the changes to dress and weaponry were minor, the drums being replaced by bugles and the sergeants' halberds by fusils (light muskets).

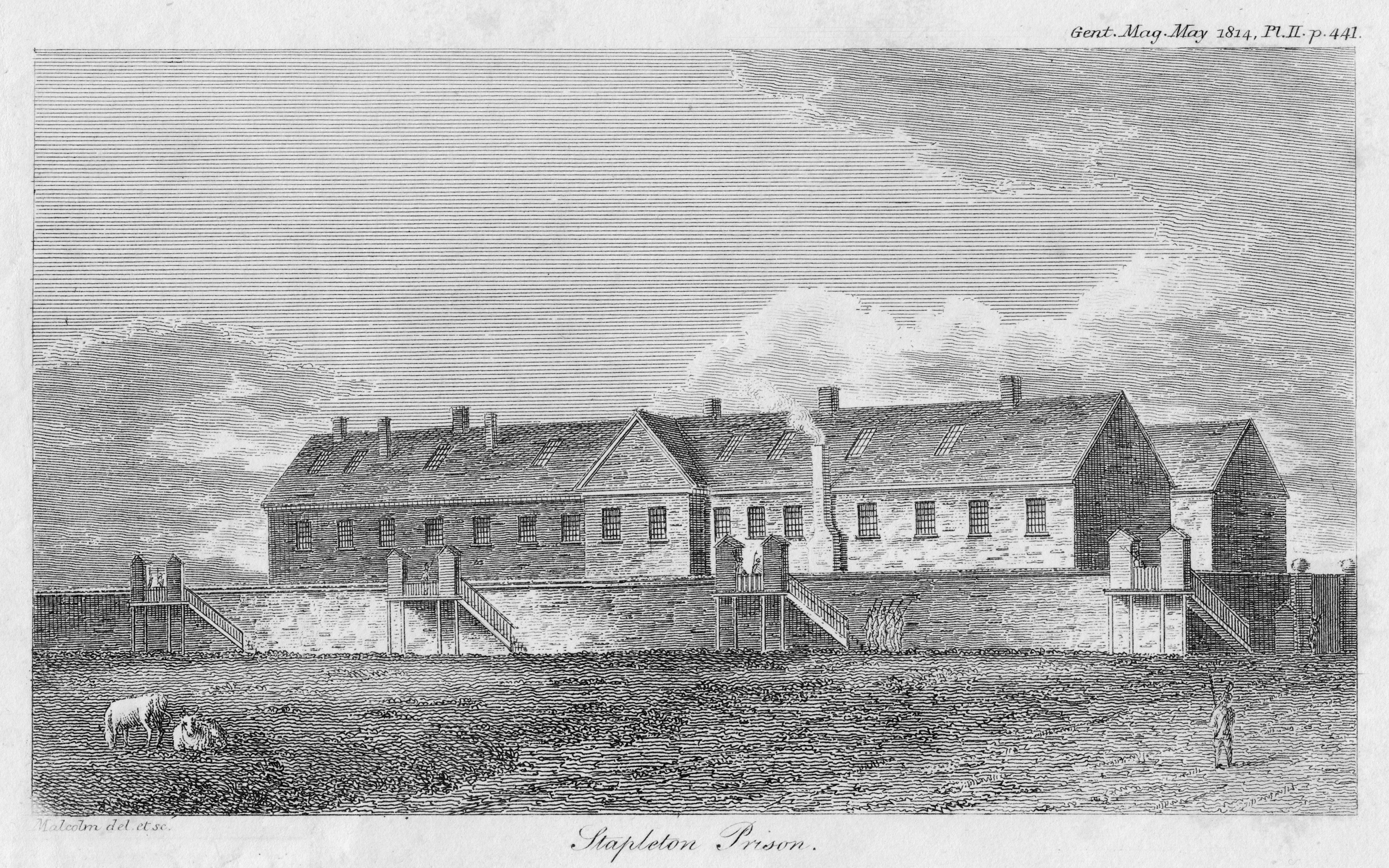
Stapleton Prison in 1814.

In May 1811 the regiment marched out of Fort Pitt on its way to Bristol, where the duties included guarding prisoners of war at Stapleton Prison and manning the Avon forts. It was ordered to Portsmouth in April 1812 but on the way it was diverted to the industrial north of England where there had been an outbreak of Luddite machine-breaking. The regiment went to Yorkshire, first to Sheffield and then Hull, where it arrived in June. Between January and June 1813 it was at Mansfield in Nottinghamshire, then moved to Nantwich in Cheshire. The regiment then moved into the Chester Garrison, where it stayed for the remainder of its embodiment.

Late in 1813 the regiment was redesignated the Royal Denbighshire Rifle Corps of Militia. As such it adopted rifles in place of muskets, and gave up its regimental colours. In January the following year Rifle green uniforms were issued.

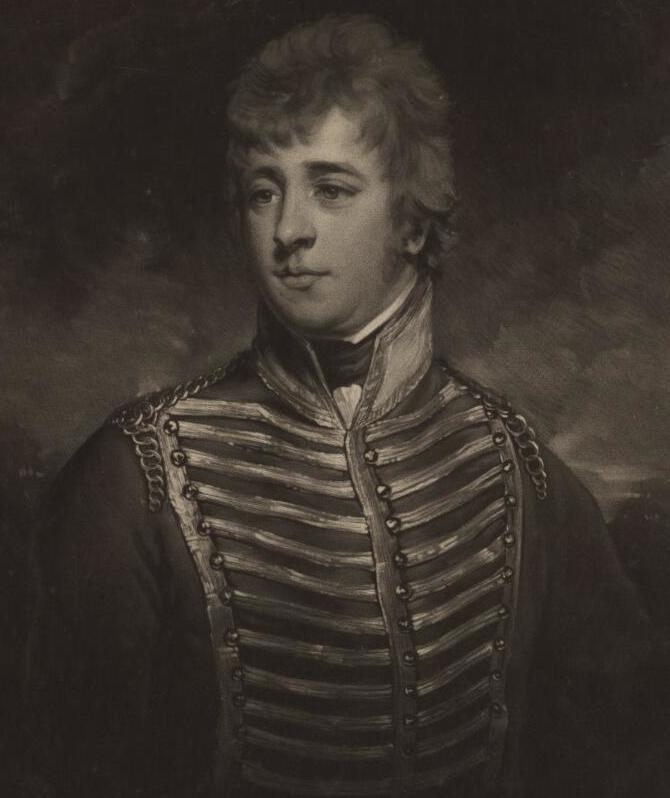
Portrait of Col Sir Watkin Williams-Wynn, 5th Baronet, dated 1802; the uniform is probably that of one of his other commands.

=== 3rd Provisional Battalion ===
In November 1813 the militia were invited to volunteer for limited overseas service, primarily for garrison duties in Europe. Some 242 out of 300 men of the Royal Denbighshire Rifles volunteered, but many withdrew and joined the regular army when it became clear that Col Sir Watkin Williams-Wynn was not to lead them. Rather than lose the whole Denbighshire contingent, the War Office appointed Sir Watkin as commanding officer of the 3rd Provisional Battalion and he had no difficulty in persuading many of his officers and men to accompany him. The battalion was formed as follows:

3rd Provisional Battalion

- Royal Denbighshire Rifles – 135 all ranks
- Derbyshire Militia – 125 all ranks
- Herefordshire Militia – 110 all ranks
- Westmorland Militia – 162 all ranks
- 2nd West Yorkshire Militia – 349 all ranks

The battalion assembled at Chester and marched to Portsmouth where the Militia Brigade under the Marquess of Buckingham was assembling. The brigade embarked on 10–11 March 1814 and three days later arrived at Bordeaux, which had just been occupied by the Earl of Dalhousie's 7th Division. It did not take part in the Battle of Toulouse on 10 April, but carried out garrison and occupation duties as the war was ending. The 3rd Provisional Battalion was quartered in a villages along the River Gironde. The brigade did not form part of the Army of Occupation after the abdication of Napoleon and returned to Plymouth in June. The Denbigh detachment marched back to Wrexham for disbandment.

=== Waterloo and the long peace ===
The rest of the Royal Denbighshire Rifles at Chester had been brought up to strength by means of the ballot. It too marched back to Wrexham in June 1814 to be disembodied. However, Napoleon's return to France in 1815 led to another war and the Royal Denbighshire Rifles were embodied once more in May. The regiment was recruited up to strength by 'beat of drum' and by the ballot and returned to the Chester garrison. The short war was ended by the Battle of Waterloo in June, and the regiment was disembodied again in September.

After Waterloo there was another long peace. Although officers continued to be commissioned into the militia and ballots were still held, the regiments were rarely assembled for training (the Denbighs only trained in 1821, 1825 and 1831, and then not again for 21 years) and the permanent staffs of sergeants and drummers were progressively reduced. Other than those of the permanent staff, who supported the parish constables, all weapons were returned to store at Chester Castle.

Robert Myddelton-Biddulph of Chirk Castle became colonel of the Royal Denbighshire Rifles (Note: Now referred to as a 'Rifle Regiment' rather than 'Rifle Corps'; 'Regiment' was dropped after 1853 when the regiment became simply the Royal Denbighshire Rifles.) after the death of Sir Watkin Williams-Wynn in 1840.

== 1852 reforms ==
The Militia of the United Kingdom was revived by the Militia Act 1852, enacted during a period of international tension. As before, units were raised and administered on a county basis, and filled by voluntary enlistment (although conscription by means of the militia ballot might be used if the counties failed to meet their quotas). Training was for 56 days on enlistment, then for 21–28 days per year, during which the men received full army pay. Under the Act, militia units could be embodied by Royal Proclamation for full-time service in three circumstances:

1. 'Whenever a state of war exists between Her Majesty and any foreign power'.
2. 'In all cases of invasion or upon imminent danger thereof'.
3. 'In all cases of rebellion or insurrection'.

The rank of colonel was abolished in the militia, but Col Myddelton-Biddulph retained his rank until his death in 1872. The county lieutenancy and permanent staff recruited the Royal Denbighshire Rifles up to its established strength of 400 men, though some recruits had to be sought from outside the county because of the opposition of the Non-conformist churches in Denbighshire. The regiment was drawn out for training at Wrexham in 1853.

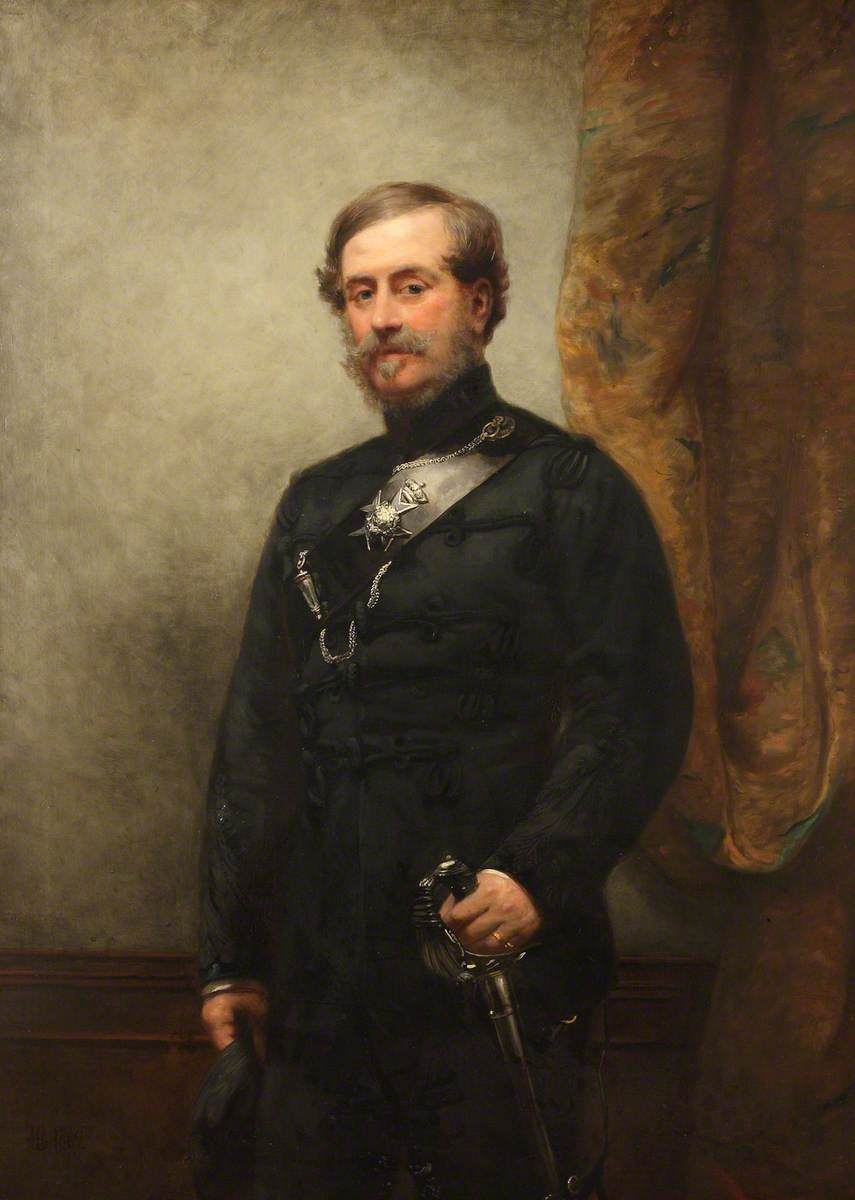
Colonel Robert Myddleton Biddulph in Rifle uniform, painted by Henry Richard Graves ca 1869. (National Trust).

=== Crimean War and after ===
War having broken out with Russia in 1854 and an expeditionary force sent to the Crimea, the militia began to be called out for home defence. Having been embodied, the militia was invited in January 1855 to volunteer for overseas service in the Mediterranean garrisons. The Royal Denbighshire Rifles was the first regiment to volunteer for this duty. However, a legal problem arose over the attestations of the recruits from 1852 to 1854, who had to be released after 56 days' service, rendering many of the 48 regiments that had volunteered temporarily too small to serve overseas, and the Denbighshires stayed at home. The regiment served an extended training period at Wrexham until June 1856 and did not carry out any garrison duties elsewhere in the UK. However, over 40 of the men volunteered for the regulars, mainly for the Brigade of Guards or the 23rd Foot (Royal Welch Fusiliers) (Note: Traditionally, the RWF used the archaic spelling 'Welch'; in 1881 this was officially changed to 'Welsh', but the regiment retained the older spelling and it was officially restored in 1921.) who had distinguished themselves at the Battle of the Alma. It appears that the regiment was not embodied to relieve regulars during the Indian Mutiny.

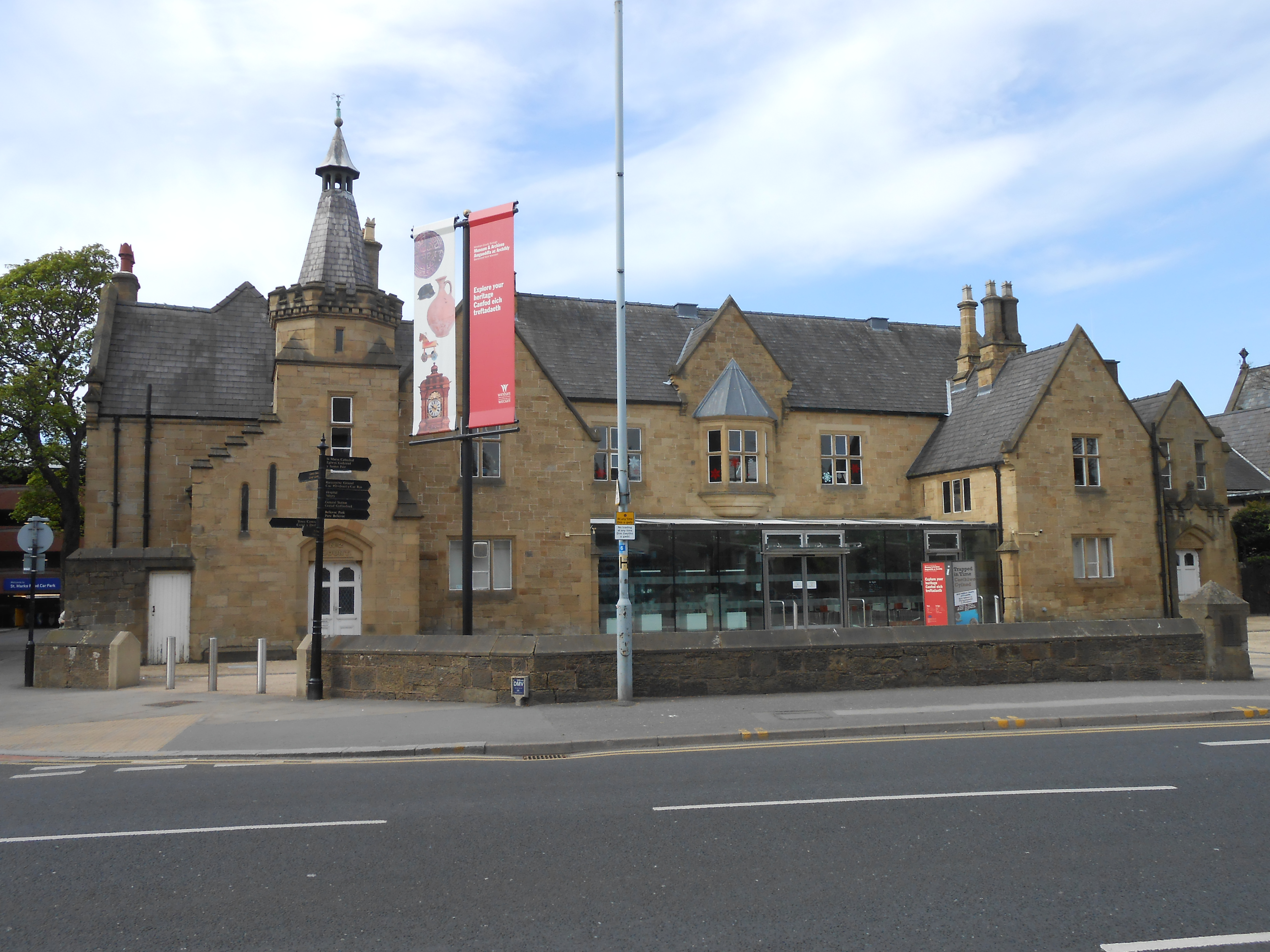
The Royal Denbighshire Rifles' Militia Barracks in Wrexham, built in 1857, now County Buildings, used by Wrexham County Borough Museum.

In 1857 the regiment moved its HQ and armoury out of Wrexham Town Hall into a purpose-built Militia Barracks on Regent Street in the town. In 1860 the Brunswick rifle with which it had been equipped was replaced by the Short Enfield rifle.

In 1861 the War Office ordered the amalgamation of the Denbighshire and Flintshire militia quotas to form a larger regiment. The Royal Denbighshire Rifles were officially merged with the Royal Flint Rifles at Mold to form the Royal Denbigh & Flint Rifles. However, the two contingents continued to operate separately and the merger was rescinded in 1867 when the regiments reverted to their previous titles. (Note: Though leaving off 'shire' from the county title.)

The Militia Reserve introduced in 1867 consisted of present and former militiamen who undertook to serve overseas in case of war. From 1871 The militia came under the War Office rather than their county lords lieutenant and by now the battalions had a large cadre of permanent staff (about 30). Around a third of the recruits and many young officers went on to join the regular army. About this time the Royal Denbigh Rifles were re-equipped with the new Snider–Enfield breechloader.

== Cardwell Reforms ==
Under the 'Localisation of the Forces' scheme introduced by the Cardwell Reforms of 1872, the militia were brigaded with their local regular and volunteer battalions on 1 April 1873. For the Royal Denbigh Rifles this was in No 23 Brigade Sub-District covering the militia of the five northern counties of Wales (Anglesey, Carnarvon, Denbigh, Flint and Merioneth), grouped with the 23rd (Royal Welch Fusiliers) and the Denbigh and Flint rifle volunteers.

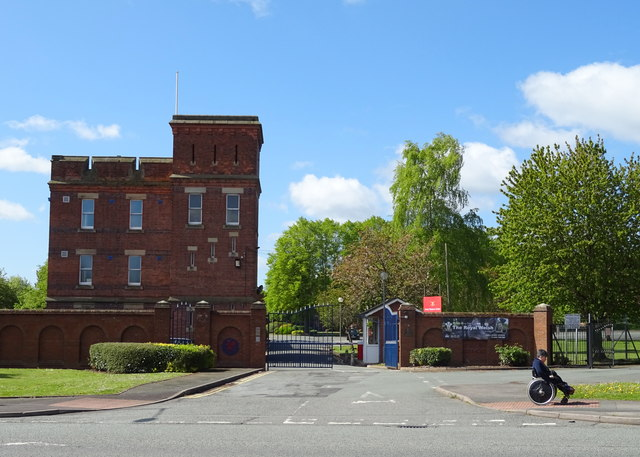
Hightown Barracks, Wrexham, built as the depot for the Royal Welch Fusiliers in 1877.

Following the Cardwell Reforms a mobilisation scheme began to appear in the Army List from December 1875. This assigned regular and militia units to places in an order of battle of corps, divisions and brigades for the 'Active Army', even though these formations were entirely theoretical, with no staff or services assigned. The Royal Denbigh Rifles were assigned as 'Divisional Troops' to 1st Division, VI Corps. The division would have mustered at Chester in time of war.

Once again the small size of the Welsh regiments led to mergers. In 1876 the Royal Denbigh Rifles were amalgamated with the Royal Merioneth Rifles to form the Royal Denbigh & Merioneth Rifles, 800 strong.

In 1877 the Royal Denbighshire & Merioneth Rifles moved out of their barracks on Regent Street, Wrexham, and moved into the Royal Welch Fusiliers' new depot at Hightown Barracks outside the town.

On 19 April 1878 the militia reserve was called out during the period of international tension over the Russo-Turkish War. The contingent from the Royal Denbigh & Merioneth Rifles was sent to Enniskillen in Ireland to train with 1st Battalion, Royal Welch Fusiliers.

== 3rd Battalion, Royal Welch Fusiliers ==
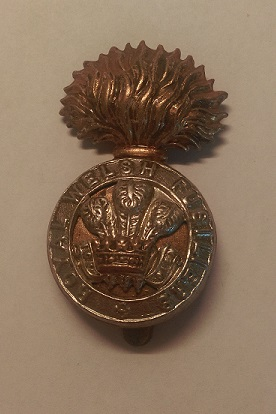
Royal Welch Fusiliers' cap badge.

The Childers Reforms of 1881 took Cardwell's reforms further, with the militia formally joining their linked regiments. Of the four regiments in No 23 Sub-District, the Royal Anglesey Militia had been converted to Royal Engineers and the Royal Flint Militia became 6th Battalion King's Royal Rifle Corps (KRRC). The others formed two battalions of the Royal Welch Fusiliers (RWF):

- 3rd (Royal Denbigh & Merioneth Militia) Battalion
- 4th (Royal Carnarvon Militia) Battalion

The rifle regiments gave up their green uniforms and adopted the red of the RWF, and by 1886 the Royal Denbigh & Merioneth had been presented with new Colours.

The 6th (Royal Flint Militia) Bn, KRRC, was disbanded in 1889, after which the Army List shows that the titles of the RWF militia battalions were altered:

- 3rd (Royal Denbigh & Flint Militia) Battalion
- 4th (Royal Carnarvon & Merioneth Militia) Battalion

=== Second Boer War ===
After the disasters of Black Week at the start of the Second Boer War in December 1899, most of the regular army was sent to South Africa, and many militia units were called out to replace them. The 3rd Bn RWF was accordingly embodied on 8 December 1899. Although it only served at home, its militia reservists were sent as reinforcements to the 1st Battalion RWF serving in South Africa. They participated in an action at Rooidam and the march to relieve Mafeking.

Shortly after the battalion was embodied it moved to Plymouth, where it was quartered in Crownhill Barracks. On 9 May it moved to Salisbury Plain for training. It returned to Crownhill in October where it remained until the end of June 1901. The regiment was then disembodied at Wrexham on 5 July 1901.

== Special Reserve ==
After the Boer War, there were moves to reform the Auxiliary Forces (militia, yeomanry and volunteers) to take their place in the six army corps proposed by St John Brodrick as Secretary of State for War. However, little of Brodrick's scheme was carried out. Under the sweeping Haldane Reforms of 1908, the militia was replaced by the Special Reserve, a semi-professional force similar to the previous militia reserve, whose role was to provide reinforcement drafts for regular units serving overseas in wartime.

The 3rd Militia Battalion accordingly transferred to the SR as the 3rd (Reserve) Battalion, Royal Welch Fusiliers on 28 June 1908. (Note: The 4th (Royal Carnarvon & Merioneth Militia) Bn did not transfer and was disbanded.)

== World War I ==
=== 3rd (Reserve) Battalion ===
When war broke out on 4 August 1914 the battalion was embodied at Pembroke Dock (probably where it was on annual training); it returned to Wrexham to mobilise on 9 August under the command of Lt-Col H.R. Jones-Williams, CO since 15 July 1912. The 3rd Battalion's role was to equip the Reservists and Special Reservists of the Royal Welch Fusiliers and send them as reinforcement drafts to the regular battalions serving on the Western Front. Once the pool of reservists had dried up, the 3rd Bn trained thousands of raw recruits for the active service battalions. The 12th (Reserve) Battalion was formed by the 3rd Bn at Wrexham in October 1914 to provide reinforcements for the 'Kitchener's Army' battalions of the RWF.

Among the young officers who entered the regiment through the Special Reserve at this time was Robert Graves, the future war poet, who described his experience at Wrexham in his memoir Good-Bye to All That. Because of the shortage of khaki service uniforms, the SR men were initially clothed in temporary blue uniforms, or even old scarlet tunics. Among the duties for the RWF special reservists was to guard an internment camp for German civilians set up in a disused waggon works at Lancaster. One of the first new SR officers of the regiment to be killed was Will Gladstone, MP, grandson of the former prime minister W.E. Gladstone.

In May 1915 the 3rd Bn went to Litherland, Liverpool, and then in November 1917 it moved to Ireland and was stationed at Limerick until the end of the war After the Armistice with Germany the 3rd Bn continued in service until the remaining personnel were drafted to the 2nd Bn on 9 August 1919 and the battalion was disembodied on 23 August.

=== 12th (Reserve) Battalion ===
After Lord Kitchener issued his call for volunteers in August 1914, the battalions of the 1st, 2nd and 3rd New Armies ('K1', 'K2' and 'K3' of 'Kitchener's Army') were quickly formed at the regimental depots. The SR battalions also swelled with new recruits and were soon well above their establishment strength. On 8 October 1914 each SR battalion was ordered to use the surplus to form a service battalion of the 4th New Army ('K4'). Accordingly, the 3rd (Reserve) Bn at Wrexham formed the 12th (Service) Bn RWF. It moved to Tenby in February 1915 and trained for active service as part of 104th Brigade in 35th Division. On 10 April 1915 the War Office decided to convert the K4 battalions into reserve units, providing drafts for the K1–K3 battalions in the same way that the SR was doing for the Regular battalions. The SWB battalion became 9th (Reserve) Battalion and in June it moved to Kinmel Camp in 14th Reserve Brigade, where it trained drafts for the 8th, 9th, 10th and 11th (Service) Bns RWF. On 1 September 1916 it became 62nd Training Reserve Bn, still in 14th Reserve Bde. On 27 October 1917 it transferred to the Cheshire Regiment as 53rd (Young Soldier) Battalion, remaining at Kinmell in 14th Reserve Bde. After the war ended it was converted into a service battalion on 8 February 1919 and joined the British Army of the Rhine where it was absorbed into 9th (Service) Bn, Cheshire, on 3 April 1919.

=== Postwar ===
The SR resumed its old title of Militia in 1921 but like most militia units the 3rd RWF remained in abeyance after World War I. By the outbreak of World War II in 1939, no officers remained listed for the 3rd Bn. The Militia was formally disbanded in April 1953.

== Commanders ==
The following commanded the regiment:

Colonel

- John Robinson, 1665
- Sir Richard Myddelton, 3rd Baronet of Chirk Castle, 1684
- Earl of Macclesfield, 1697
- Richard Myddleton of Chirk Castle, 1760
- Watkyn Wynn of Wynnstay, 1762
- John Myddleton of Gwaenynog, 1778
- Richard John Kenrick of Nantclywd, 1794
- Sir Watkin Williams-Wynn, 5th Baronet, 15 January 1797, died 1840
- Robert Myddelton-Biddulph of Chirk Castle, 1840

Lieutenant-Colonel Commandant

- Sir Robert Cunliffe, 5th Baronet, of Acton Hall, formerly of the Scots Fusilier Guards, 22 May 1872
- Samuel Sandbach, 21 November 1894
- Rumley F. Godfrey, 15 July 1905
- H.R. Jones-Williams, 15 July 1912

Honorary Colonel

- Sir Robert Cunliffe, 5th Baronet, former CO appointed 12 May 1886
- Nevill Vaughan Lloyd-Mostyn, 3rd Lord Mostyn, appointed 4 October 1905

== Heritage and ceremonial ==
=== Uniforms and insignia ===
From 1760 to 1813 the uniform was similar to that of the regular infantry of the line, with blue facings on the red coat. On conversion to rifles in 1813 he uniform changed to Rifle green with blue facings. As a battalion of the Royal Welch Fusiliers it adopted that regiment's red uniform with blue facings.

After the regular Rifle regiments adopted a busby as their head-dress in 1873, the officers of the Royal Denbigh & Merioneth Rifles also adopted it by 1877. The permanent staff continued to wear the older Shako, while the other ranks wore the Glengarry cap. The officers later adopted the bearskin fusilier cap of the RWF.

The other ranks' buttons of the Denbighshire Militia ca 1797 showed the Prince of Wales's feathers, coronet and motto 'ICH DIEN' above the letters 'DM', later replaced by 'ROYAL DENBIGH'. The officers' shoulder belt plate bore a similar design in silver, with the coronet gilded, either above or between the letters 'RD'. The bronze shako plate ca 1830 consisted of the feathers, coronet and motto superimposed on a rayed star surmounted by a crown, a scroll beneath inscribed 'ROYAL DENBIGH'. About 1857 the badge on the other ranks' undress cap was a stringed bugle-horn above the 'ROYAL DENBIGH' scroll (changed to 'DENBIGH AND FLINT' 1861–7). By about 1877 until 1881 the other ranks' Glengarry cap badge consisted of the Welsh dragon encircled by a garter inscribed 'Y DDRAIG GOCH A DDYRY GYCHWYN' ('The Red Dragon creates an impetus'). The officers' busby badge at this time was a simple crown over a bugle-horn. After 1881 the regiment adopted the RWF insignia.

The Regimental colour issued in 1760 carried the Coat of arms of the Lord Lieutenant of Denbighshire (at that time Richard Myddleton of Chirk Castle, who was also the regiment's colonel) on a red field, presumably on a blue backing to match the regiment's facings. The regiment carried no colours when it was designated as rifles.

=== Precedence ===
In 1760 a system of drawing lots was introduced to determine the relative precedence of militia regiments serving together. During the War of American Independence the counties were given an order of precedence determined by ballot each year. For the Denbighshire Militia the positions were:

- 1778 – 22nd
- 1779 – 4th
- 1780 – 40th
- 1781 – 24th
- 1783 – 34th

The militia order of precedence balloted for in 1793 (Denbighshire was 7th) remained in force throughout the French Revolutionary War. Another ballot for precedence took place at the start of the Napoleonic War, when Denbighshire was 4th. This order continued until 1833. In that year the King drew the lots and the resulting list remained in force with minor amendments until the end of the militia. The regiments raised before the peace of 1763 took the first places and the Denbighshire was awarded 46th place. The regimental number was only a subsidiary title and most regiments paid little attention to it.

== See also ==
- Trained Bands
- Militia (English)
- Militia (Great Britain)
- Militia (United Kingdom)
- Royal Welch Fusiliers
