= Robert Myddelton Biddulph (1761–1814) =

British politician

Member of Parliament for Denbigh Boroughs
- In office 1806–1812
- Preceded by: Frederick West
- Succeeded by: Viscount Kirkwall

Member of Parliament for Herefordshire
- In office 1801–1802 Serving with Thomas Harley
- Preceded by: Parliament of Great Britain
- Succeeded by: George Cornewall, John Cotterell
- In office 1796–1800 Serving with Thomas Harley
- Preceded by: Thomas Harley; George Cornewall
- Succeeded by: Parliament of the United Kingdom

Personal details
- Born: Robert Biddulph; March 1761
- Died: 14 August 1814 (aged 53)
- Spouse: Charlotte Myddelton (m. 1801)
- Children: Robert Myddelton Biddulph; Thomas Myddelton Biddulph; Charlotte Elizabeth Maude
- Parent(s): Michael Biddulph; Penelope Dandridge
- Occupation: Merchant, politician

Robert Myddelton Biddulph (né Biddulph; March 1761 – 30 August 1814) was a British Member of Parliament (MP).

== Early life ==
The first son of Penelope (née Dandridge) Biddulph and barrister Michael Biddulph of Ledbury in Herefordshire and Cofton Hall in Worcestershire. His elder sister, Anne Biddulph, was the wife of David Gordon, 14th of Abergeldie. His younger sister, Penelope Biddulph, married Adam Gordon, brother of David Gordon (both sons of Charles Gordon, 12th of Abergeldie).

His paternal grandparents were Robert Biddulph and Anne (née Joliffe) Biddulph. His maternal grandfather was John Dandridge of Balden's Green, Malvern, Worcestershire.

== Career ==
Biddulph made a fortune in Bengal before returning to England in 1795. He served as Recorder of Denbigh from 1795 to 1796, then entered politics under the patronage of the Whig Duke of Norfolk. He became a member of Brooks's on 26 April 1796, and was an unsuccessful candidate for Leominster before being elected to the House of Commons for Herefordshire the same year, replacing Sir George Cornewall. In Parliament he acted with the Foxite Whigs.

Biddulph succeeded his father in 1800, and also succeeded his uncle Francis Biddulph as partner in the bank Cocks, Biddulph & Co.

In the 1802 general election Myddelton Biddulph was defeated by Cornewall and left Parliament, but resumed the office of Recorder of Denbigh (which he held until his death) and became a common councilman of the borough. In 1803 he was Lieutenant-Colonel commanding the Chirk Volunteers. His wife's family had long represented Denbigh in Parliament, and in 1806 he succeeded her brother-in-law Frederick West as Member for Denbigh Boroughs.

In his second time in Parliament Myddelton Biddulph sat as an independent, in opposition to the government. He fell out with his wife's brother-in-law West in 1811 and was not re-elected in 1812.

== Personal life ==
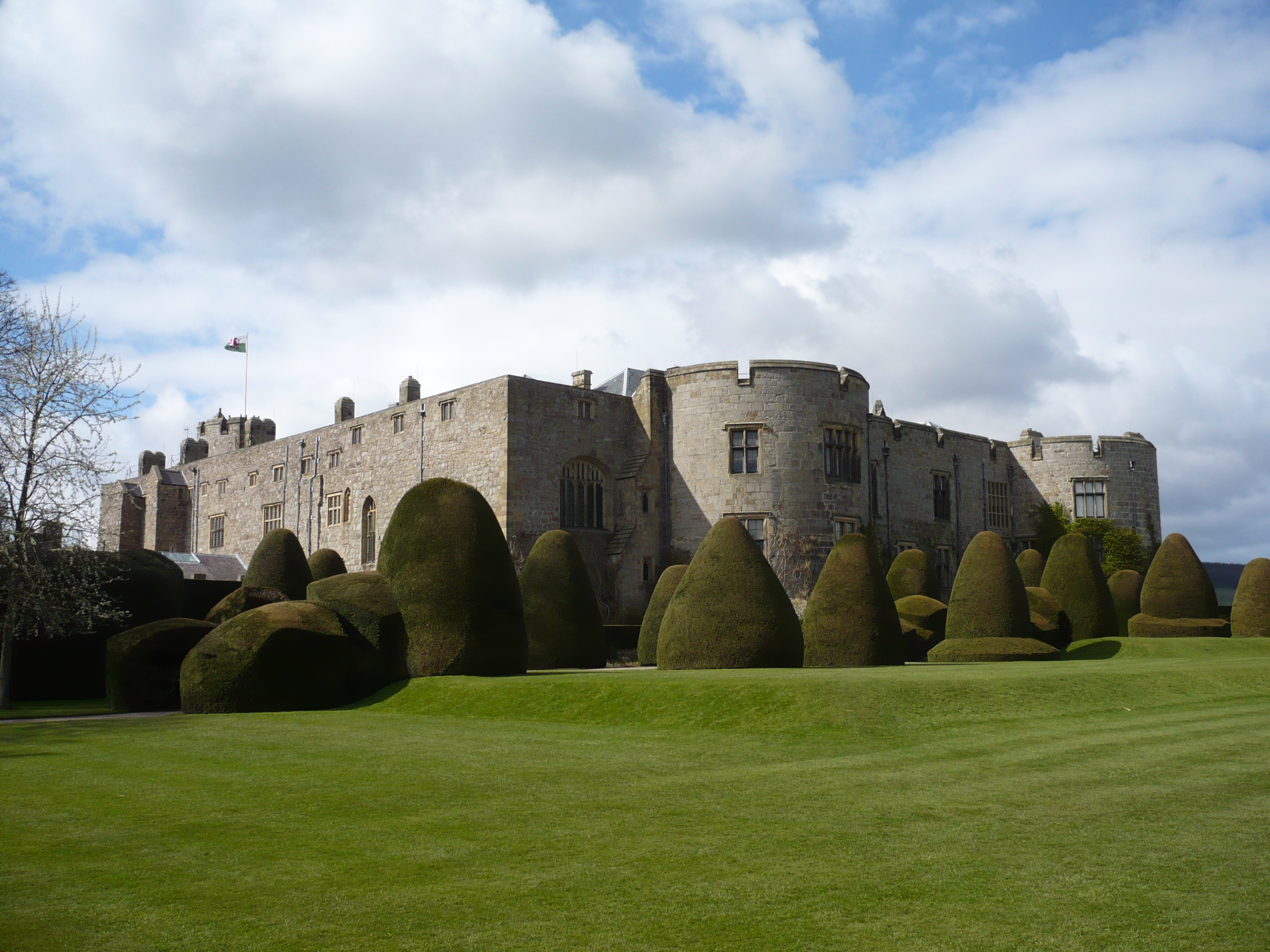
Chirk Castle

On 24 December 1801 he married heiress Charlotte Myddelton, daughter of Richard Myddelton and sister of Richard Myddelton, of Chirk Castle. He adopted, by royal license, the additional surname of Myddelton on 29 December 1801 after his wife had inherited Chirk Castle from her unmarried brother Richard Myddelton in 1796. They had two sons and one daughter, including:

- Robert Myddelton Biddulph (1805–1872), an MP for Denbigh Boroughs and Denbighshirel he married Frances Mostyn-Owen, a granddaughter of William Mostyn Owen, MP.
- Sir Thomas Myddelton Biddulph (1809–1878), a General in the British Army and courtier; he married the Hon. Mary Frederica Seymour, one of the Queen's maids of honour, and a granddaughter of Vice-Admiral Lord Hugh Seymour and Lady Mary Gordon (a daughter of George Gordon, 9th Marquess of Huntly).
- Charlotte Elizabeth Myddelton-Biddulph (d. 1871), who married the Rev. Charles Maude, Rector of Great Munden, in 1849.

Myddelton Biddulph died on 30 August 1814. He was succeeded by his eldest son Robert in 1814, who also succeeded his widow in 1843, inheriting the Chirk estate.

Parliament of Great Britain
Preceded by Thomas Harley; George Cornewall	Member of Parliament for Herefordshire; 1796 – 1800; With: Thomas Harley	Succeeded by Parliament of the United Kingdom
Parliament of the United Kingdom
Preceded by Parliament of Great Britain	Member of Parliament for Herefordshire; 1801 – 1802; With: Thomas Harley	Succeeded by George Cornewall; John Cotterell
Preceded by Frederick West	Member of Parliament for Denbigh Boroughs; 1806 – 1812	Succeeded by Viscount Kirkwall
