= Frederick West (1767–1852) =

British politician

The Honourable Frederick West

Member of Parliament for Denbigh Boroughs
- In office 1801–1806
- Preceded by: Thomas Jones
- Succeeded by: Robert Myddelton Biddulph

Personal details
- Born: 1767
- Died: 22 March 1852 (aged 84–85)
- Spouses: Charlotte Mitchell (m. 1792; died 1795) Maria Myddelton (m. 1798; died 1843)
- Children: Charlotte Louisa West; Frederick Richard West
- Parent(s): John West, 2nd Earl De La Warr; Mary Wynyard
- Relatives: John West, 1st Earl De La Warr (grandfather); John Wynyard (grandfather)
- Education: Harrow School

Frederick West (1767 – 22 March 1852) was a British politician who sat in the House of Commons from 1801 to 1806.

== Early life ==
West was the third son of Mary (née Wynyard), Countess De La Warr, and Lieutenant-General John West, 2nd Earl De La Warr, Lord Chamberlain to Queen Charlotte. His elder brothers were William West, 3rd Earl De La Warr, a Lt.-Col. in the Coldstream Guards and John West, 4th Earl De La Warr. He also had two sisters, Lady Georgiana West (the wife of Edward Pery Buckley and mother of Edward Pery Buckley, MP for Salisbury), and Lady Matilda West (the wife of Gen. Henry Wynyard, Commander-in-Chief, Scotland).

His paternal grandparents were John West, 1st Earl De La Warr (only son of John West, 6th Baron De La Warr) and the former Lady Charlotte McCarthy (only daughter of Donough MacCarthy, 4th Earl of Clancarty and Lady Elizabeth Spencer, second daughter of Robert Spencer, 2nd Earl of Sunderland. His maternal grandparents were Lieutenant-General John Wynyard and the former and Catherine Allestrec.

He was educated at Harrow School in 1774.

== Career ==
In 1801 he served as a councilman in Denbigh and in the same year was elected Member of Parliament for Denbigh Boroughs. While in Parliament, West gave a silent support to administration; he was initially listed as doubtful, then as a friend of William Pitt's government in 1804 and 1805, opposing Samuel Whitbread's censure of Viscount Melville on 8 April 1805. In 1806, he was ousted from Parliament by his brother-in-law, Robert Myddelton Biddulph, who had married his wife's elder sister. Biddulph and West "did not see eye to eye, and although West did not himself seek to return to Parliament he sponsored the successful candidature of Viscount Kirkwall against Biddulph in 1812, and in 1820 put up his son, who later represented the boroughs."

He was a captain in the Berkshire Volunteers in 1803 and in the Berkshire militia in 1808. In the autumn of 1804, King George III visited him at Culham Court. Between 1810 and 1815, he was a Groom of the Bedchamber. In 1813, he applied to Queen Charlotte (who felt "a sincere regard" for him, his father having been "one of her earliest and most faithful servants") for "an Irish barony of the title of Myddelton chiefly with a view to give weight to that interest in the county of Denbigh which has been devoted to the support of his Majesty's government", although nothing came of it. From 1821 to 1822 he was Sheriff of Berkshire.

== Personal life ==
West married twice and inherited the properties of both his fathers-in-law. On 17 April 1792, West was married to Charlotte Mitchell at Wargrave (now Remenham) in Berkshire. She was a daughter of Richard Mitchell of Culham Court. Before her death on 13 June 1795, they were the parents of:

- Charlotte Louisa West (d. 1869).

On 31 May 1798, he married, secondly, to Maria Myddelton, a daughter of Richard Myddleton of Chirk Castle and the sister-in-law, and heiress, of Robert Myddelton Biddulph. They were the parents of:

- Frederick Richard West (1799–1862), an MP in Denbighshire who married Lady Georgiana Stanhope, a daughter of Philip Stanhope, 5th Earl of Chesterfield and Lady Henrietta Thynne (third daughter of Thomas Thynne, 1st Marquess of Bath), in 1820. After her death, he married, secondly, Theresa Whitby, daughter of Capt. John Whitby and Mary Anne Symonds.

His second wife died on 23 October 1843. West died on 22 March 1852.

=== Descendants ===
Through his son Frederick, he was a grandfather of Georgiana Theresa Ella Cornwallis-West (d. 1915), the wife of Warren William Richard Peacocke, and William Cornwallis-West (1835–1917), also an MP in Denbighshire who married Mary Adelaide Virginia Eupatoria FitzPatrick (daughter of Rev. Frederick Fitzpatrick and Lady Olivia Taylour, a daughter of Thomas Taylour, 2nd Marquess of Headfort).

Parliament of the United Kingdom
Preceded by Thomas Jones	Member of Parliament for Denbigh Boroughs; 1801–1806	Succeeded by Robert Myddelton Biddulph
