= Cocks Biddulph =

- Industry: Banking
- Founded: 1757
- Defunct: 1966
- Fate: Acquired by Bank of Liverpool and Martins Ltd, 1919
- Successor: Bank of Liverpool and Martins Ltd; Barclays Bank Limited
- Headquarters: London

Cocks Biddulph was a London bank founded in 1757.

== History ==
The banking partnership of James Cocks and Francis Biddulph formed in 1757 and in 1759 the bank moved to 43 Charing Cross, later redesignated 16 Whitehall. The company went through a number of name changes -

- 1763 Biddulph and Cocks when it first appears in the list of bankers
- 1776 Biddulph, Cocks, Eliot and Praed
- 1792 Biddulph Cocks and Ridge
- 1820 Cocks, Cocks, Ridge and Biddulph
- 1827 Cocks and Biddulph
- 1845 Cocks, Biddulph and Co.
- 1860 Biddulph, Cocks and Co.
- 1865 Cocks, Biddulph and Co.

The late 19th-century was a period of expansion by acquisition; in 1886 Cocks Biddulph and Co. purchased the assets of Codd and Co. and 1893 they acquired Hallett & Co Navy Agents

On 30 December 1919 Cocks Biddulph was acquired by the Bank of Liverpool and Martins Ltd becoming, in 1928, Martins Bank Limited, the branch premises being known as London Cocks Biddulph, sort code 11-00-20. On 15 December 1969, it became part of Barclays Bank Limited, known as Whitehall Cocks Biddulph, sort code 20-95-81.

The Whitehall premises closed in 1997, becoming a wine bar.
