= Robert Myddelton Biddulph (1805–1872) =

British politician (1805–1872)

Colonel Robert Myddelton Biddulph
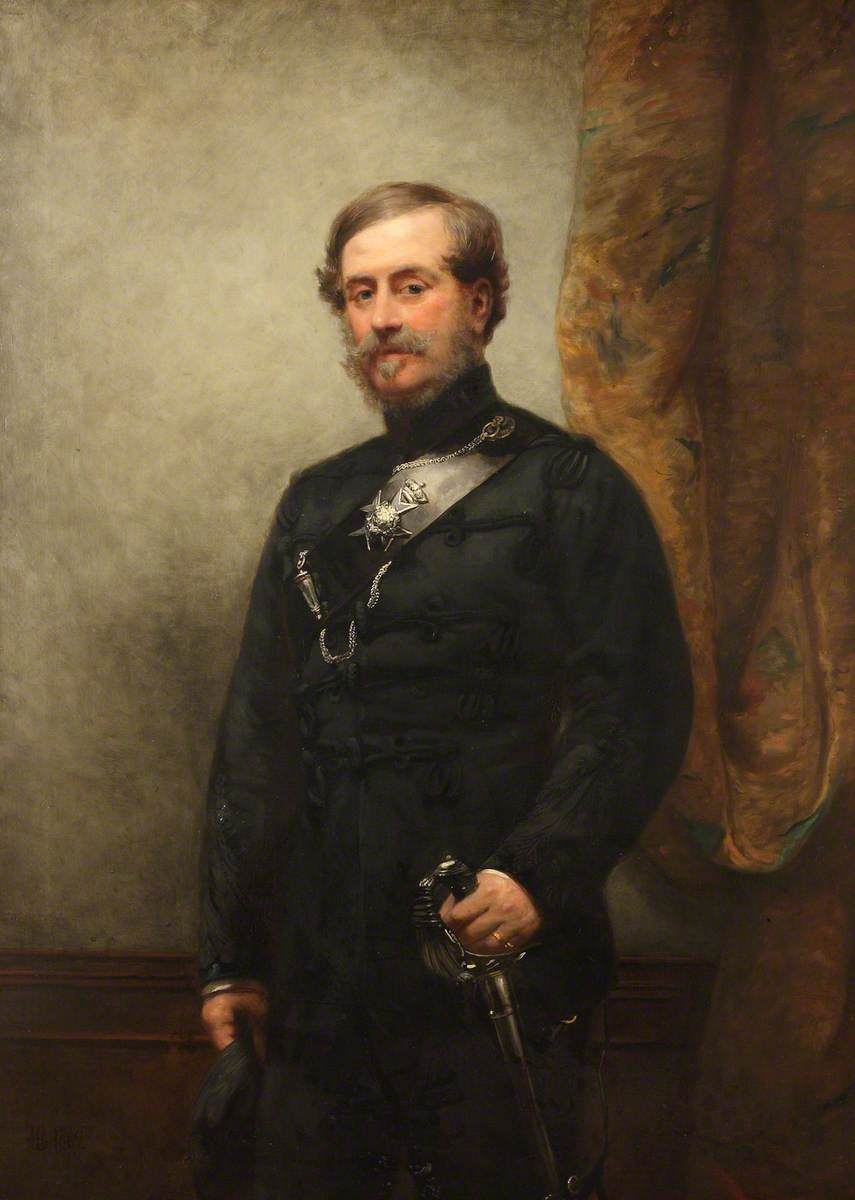
- Portrait of Robert Myddleton Biddulph by Henry Richard Graves

Member of Parliament for Denbigh Boroughs
- In office 1830–1832
- Preceded by: Frederick Richard West
- Succeeded by: John Madocks

Member of Parliament for Denbighshire
- In office 1832–1835 Serving with Sir Watkin Williams-Wynn, Bt
- Preceded by: Sir Watkin Williams-Wynn, Bt
- Succeeded by: Sir Watkin Williams-Wynn, Bt; William Bagot

Member of Parliament for Denbighshire
- In office 1852–1868 Serving with Sir Watkin Williams-Wynn, Bt
- Preceded by: William Bagot
- Succeeded by: George Osborne Morgan

Personal details
- Born: 20 June 1805
- Died: 21 March 1872 (aged 66)
- Party: Liberal
- Spouse: Frances Mostyn-Owen (m. 1832)
- Children: 2
- Parents: Robert Myddelton Biddulph (father); Charlotte Myddelton (mother)
- Relatives: Thomas Myddelton Biddulph (brother)
- Education: Eton College
- Military career
- Allegiance: United Kingdom
- Branch: British Army
- Service years: 1840-1872
- Rank: Colonel
- Unit: Royal Denbigh Rifles

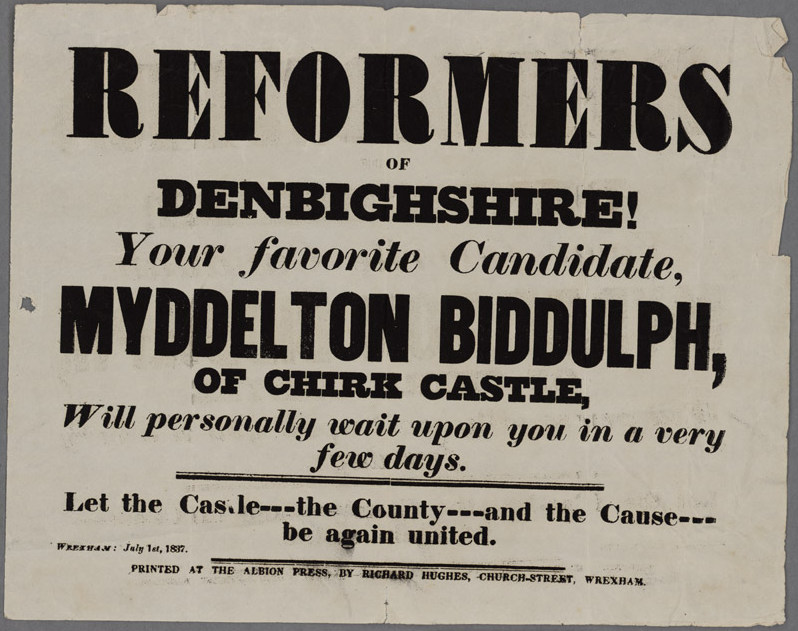
Election poster

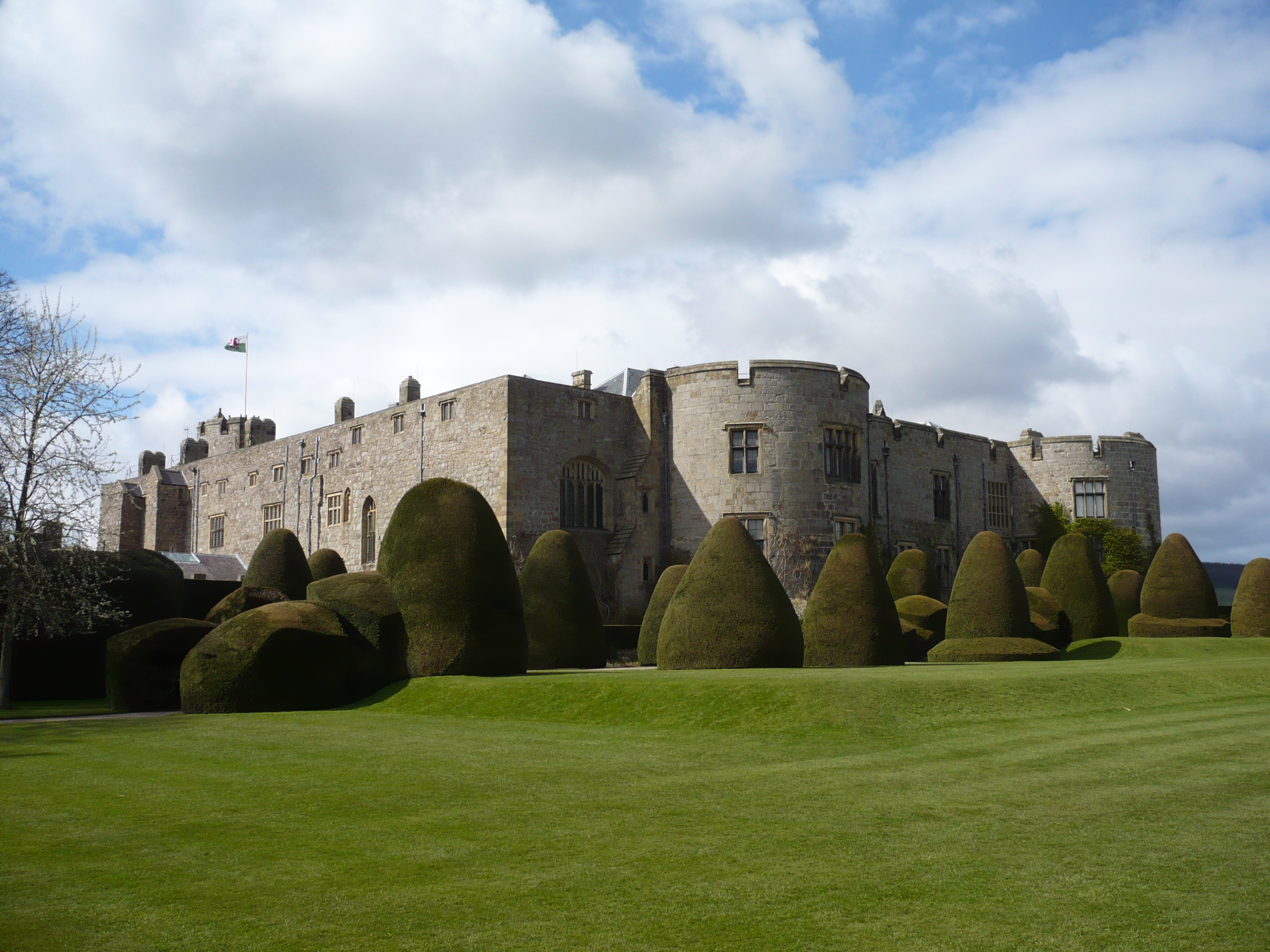
Chirk Castle

Colonel Robert Myddelton Biddulph (20 June 1805 – 21 March 1872) was a British landowner and Member of Parliament for the Liberal Party.

== Early life ==
He was the elder son of Robert Myddelton Biddulph (1761–1814) of Burghill by his wife Charlotte Myddelton of Chirk Castle, Denbighshire. He was educated at Eton College. He succeeded his father in 1814 and his mother in 1843, inheriting the Chirk estate. His younger brother was Thomas Myddelton Biddulph (1809–1878), an officer in the British Army and courtier.

== Career ==
He was Member of Parliament for Denbigh Boroughs from 1830 to 1832 and for Denbighshire from 1832 to 1835 and from 1852 to 1868.

He was Colonel of the Royal Denbigh Rifles Militia from 1840, Lord Lieutenant of Denbighshire from 1841, and an aide-de-camp to Queen Victoria from 1869, holding all these offices until his death.

== Personal life ==
On 31 May 1832, he married Frances Mostyn-Owen, daughter of William Mostyn-Owen of Woodhouse in Shropshire, and granddaughter of William Mostyn Owen (c. 1742–1795), a Member of Parliament for Montgomeryshire. They had three sons (one of whom predeceased him) and three daughters. His children included:

- Mary Caroline Myddelton Biddulph (d. 1890)
- Fanny Charlotte Myddelton Biddulph (1833–1900)
- Richard Myddelton Biddulph (1837–1913), who married Catherine Arabella Howard (d. 1899), granddaughter of Edward Charles Howard (a younger brother of Bernard Howard, 12th Duke of Norfolk).

At his death, his eldest son, Richard, succeeded to Chirk Castle, his wife inherited his London house at 35 Grosvenor Place, and his brother Thomas received a life interest in the estate at Burghill.

An 1869 portrait by Henry Richard Graves was presented to Biddulph's widow in 1873. It was acquired by the National Trust in 2004 and is in the Myddelton collection at Chirk.

Parliament of the United Kingdom
| Preceded by Frederick Richard West | Member of Parliament for Denbigh Boroughs; 1830–1832 | Succeeded by John Madocks |
| Preceded by Sir Watkin Williams-Wynn, Bt | Member of Parliament for Denbighshire; 1832–1835; With: Sir Watkin Williams-Wynn, Bt | Succeeded by Sir Watkin Williams-Wynn, Bt; William Bagot |
| Preceded by William Bagot | Member of Parliament for Denbighshire; 1852–1868; With: Sir Watkin Williams-Wynn, Bt | Succeeded by George Osborne Morgan |
