= High Sheriff of Denbighshire =

Welsh county ceremonial officer

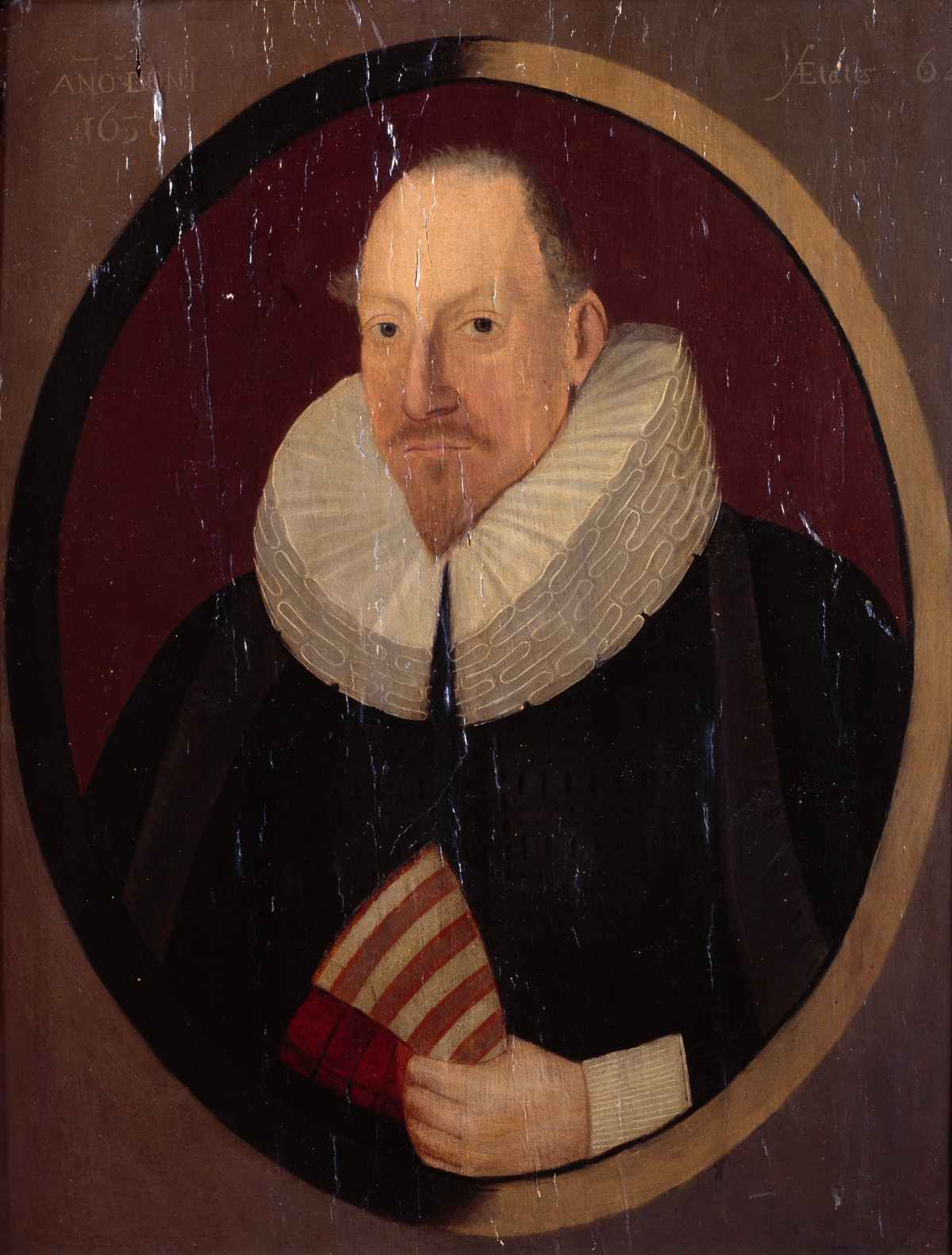
Thomas Thelwall served as High Sheriff of Denbighshire in 1643.

The first High Sheriff of Denbighshire was John Salusbury, snr, appointed in 1540. The shrievalty of Denbighshire, together with that of Flintshire, continued until 1974 when it was abolished after the county and shrievalty of Clwyd was created.

The role High Sheriff in each county is the oldest secular office under the Crown. The High Sheriff changed every March. Formerly the High Sheriff was the principal law enforcement officer in the county but over the centuries most of the responsibilities associated with the post have been transferred elsewhere or are now defunct, so that its functions are now largely ceremonial.

== List of High Sheriffs ==
=== 16th century ===
- 1541: John Salusbury, snr of Lleweni Hall
- 1542: John Salusbury of Lleweni Hall
- 1543: Sir John Puleston of Bersham
- 1544: John Puleston of Tir Mon
- 1545: John Owen of Abergeley
- 1546: Roger Salusbury of Bachymbyd
- 1547: John Edwards I of Chirkland
- 1548: Cadwaladr Wynne
- 1549: Robert Wynne ap Cadwalader of Voelas
- 1550: Ellis Price of Plas Iolyn
- 1551: John Lloyd of Yale
- 1552: Edward Abner
- 1552: Robert Mostyn of Maes Glas
- 1553: Robert Massie of Maesmynan
- 1554: Edward Almer of Almer
- 1555: Fulk Lloyd of Foxhall, Henllan
- 1556: Thomas Bylottes of Burton
- 1557: Ellis Price of Plas Iolyn
- 1558: Edward Almer of Pant Iocyn
- 1559: Robert Puleston of Bersham
- 1560: Robert Fletcher of Llanfair-Duffryn-Clwyd
- 1561: Thomas Morris of Ruthin
- 1562: Robert ap Hugh of Plas Cefn y garlleg, Llansantffraid Glan Conway and Creuddin, Caernarvonshire
- 1563: Jeffrey Holland of Eglwsfach
- 1564: John Thomas ap William of Glan Conway
- 1565: Edward Conway of Bryn Eithin
- 1566: Hugh Puleston of Bersham
- 1567: Fulk Lloyd of Foxhall, Henllan
- 1568: Evan Lloyd of Yale (Plas yn Iâl)
- 1569: Ellis Price of Plas Iolyn
- 1570: Robert Puleston of Bersham
- 1571: Edward Almer of Pant Iocyn
- 1572: Simon Thelwall of Plas-y-Ward
- 1573: Ellis Price of Voelas
- 1574: Robert Wynne ap Cadwalader of Voelas
- 1575: John Salusbury, snr of Lleweni Hall
- 1576: Edward Jones of Cadwgan
- 1577: John Wynne ap William of Melai
- 1578: Pierce Holland of Abergele
- 1579: Thomas Maurice of Ruthin
- 1580: John Price of Derwen
- 1581: Owen Brereton of Borras
- 1582: Edward Hughes of Holt
- 1583: Evan Lloyd of Yale (Plas yn Iâl)
- 1584: Pierce Owen of Garthymedd, Abergele
- 1585: Henry Parry of Maes Glas
- 1586: William Wynne of Melai
- 1587: William Almer of Pant Iocyn
- 1588: Owen Brereton of Borras
- 1589: Edward Eyton of Watstay
- 1590: Edward Thelwall of Plas-y-Ward
- 1591: Thomas Powell of Horsley (likely Horsley Hall, Gresford)
- 1592: Fulk Lloyd of Foxhall, Henllan
- 1593: Henry ap Evan Lloyd of Hafodunos
- 1594: Griffith Wynne of Llanrwst
- 1595: Thomas Wynne ap Richard of Llanrwst
- 1596: David Holland of Kinmel
- 1597: Sir Robert Salusbury of Bachymbyd
- 1598: Edward Brereton of Borras replaced by Robert Sontley of Sontley
- 1599: Thomas Price of Spytty

=== 17th century ===
- 1600: William Myddelton of Gwaunynog
- 1601: Owen Vaughan of Llwydiarth
- 1602: David Holland of Abergeley
- 1603: Edward Eyton of Wattstay
- 1604: John Lloyd of Vaynol Rûg
- 1605: Cadwaladr Wynne II (d. 1612) of Voelas
- 1606: Sir John Wynne, Kt of Gwydir Castle
- 1607: Evan Meredith of Glan-Tannat
- 1608: Morgan Broughton of Marchwiel
- 1609: Hugh Gwyn Griffith of Berth Ddu
- 1610: Sir Richard Trevor of Trevalyn
- 1611: Robert Sontley of Sontley
- 1612: Simon Thelwall of Plas-y-Ward
- 1613: Thomas Goodman of Plas Ucha', Llanfair-Dyffryn-Clwyd
- 1614: William Wynne of Meley
- 1615: Richard Williams of Ruthin
- 1616: Thomas Powell of Horsley (likely Horsley Hall, Gresford)
- 1617: Thomas Needham of Clocaenog
- 1618: Robert Wynne of Berth Ddu +
- 1619: Foulk Middelton of Llansilin
- 1620: William Vaughan of Eyton
- 1621: Hugh Meredith of Wrexham
- 1622: Sir Edward Trevor, Kt of Bryn Kinallt
- 1623: Foulk Lloyd of Henllan
- 1624: Thomas Price Wynne of Geeler
- 1625: Sir Richard Grosvenor, 1st Baronet of Eyton (Eaton, Cheshire?)
- 1626: George Bostock of Holt
- 1627: Edward Price of Llwyn-Ynn
- 1628: Sir Henry Salusbury, Kt of Lleweni Hall
- 1629: Edward Meredith of Stansty
- 1630: William Robinson of Gwersyllt
- 1631: Robert Wynne of Voelas
- 1632: William Dolben of Denbigh
- 1633: John Parry of Plas-yn-Rhal
- 1633: John Edwards V
- 1634: Roger Holland of Abergele
- 1635: Hugh Lloyd Rosindall of Denbigh
- 1640: Richard Langford of Allington
- 1641: John Vaughan of Henllan
- 1642: John Bellot of Morton
- 1643: John Thelwall of Plas Coch
- 1643: Thomas Thelwall of Bathafarn
- 1644–1646: Sir Evan Lloyd, 1st Baronet of Yale
- 1647: John Kynaston of Ruabon
- 1648: Robert Sontley of Sontley
- 1649: Thomas Ravenscroft of Pickhill
- 1650: Richard Middelton of Llansilin
- 1651: William Wynne of Garthgynan
- 1652: Thomas Ball of Burton
- 1653: John Edwards of Chirk
- 1654: William Edwards of Eaton
- 1655: John Jeffreys of Acton
- 1656: Sir Owen Wynn, 3rd Baronet of Gwydir
- 1657: Sir Thomas Powell, 2nd Baronet of Horsley (likely Horsley Hall, Gresford)
- 1658: Robert Price of Geeler
- 1659-1660: Edward Vaughan of Llwydiarth
- 1661: Charles Salusbury of Bachymbyd
- 1662: Watkin Kyffin of Glascoed
- 1663: Roger Puleston of Emral
- 1664: Robert Wynne of Voelas
- 1665: John Carter of Kinmel
- 12 November 1665: Sir Charles Goodman, of Glanhespin
- 7 November 1666: Morris Gethin, of Cernioge
- 6 November 1667: William Parry, of Llwyn Ynn
- 6 November 1668: Hugh Lloyd, of Fox Hall
- 11 November 1669: Edward Thelwall, of Plas-y-Ward
- 1671: Mytton Davies of Llanerch
- 1672: John Thelwall of Plas Coch
- 1673: Edward Maurice of Lloran
- 1674: Sir John Wynn, 5th Baronet of Wattstay
- 1675: Cadwalader Wynn of Vayla
- 1675: John Lloyd of Gwrych
- 1676: David Maurice of Penybont
- 1677: John Langford of Allington
- 1678: Edward Brereton of Borras
- 1679: Hedd Lloyd of Hafodunos
- 1680: Thomas Holland of Tyrdan
- 1681: William Edwards of Chirk
- 1682: Josiah Edisbury of Erddig
- 1683: Griffith Jeffreys of Acton
- 1684: Thomas Powell of Horsley (likely Horsley Hall, Gresford)
- 1685: Robert Griffith, of Brymbo Hall
- 1686: William Ravenscroft of Pickhill
- 1687: Robert Davies of Llanerch
- 1688: Sir Richard Myddelton, 3rd Baronet of Chirk Castle
- 1689: Roger Mostyn of Brymbo
- 1690: William Robinson of Gwersyllt
- 1691: Thomas Wynne of Dyffryn Aled
- 1692: Simon Thelwall of Llanbedr
- 1693: David Williams of Ty-newydd, Llansilin
- 1694: Humphrey Kynaston of Bryngwyn
- 1695: David Parry of Llwyn-Ynn
- 1696: William Williams of Plas-y-Ward
- 1697: John Hill of Sontley
- 1698: Edward Broughton of Marchwiel
- 1699: Thomas Jones of Carreghofa and Shrewsbury

=== 18th century ===
- 1700: Sir Nathaniel Curzon, 2nd Baronet of Coed-marchan
- 1701: John Lloyd of Brynlluarth
- 1702: Eubule Thelwall of Nantclwyd
- 1703: Maurice Jones of Plas-Newydd died and replaced by Thomas Roberts of Llanrhudd
- 1704: Elihu Yale of Plas Gronow
- 1705: John Roberts of Hafod-y-Bwch
- 1706: Henry Vaughan of Dinerth
- 1707: Thomas Holland of Tyrdan
- 1708: David Lloyd of Bodnant
- 1709: John Wynne of Gartmeilio
- 1710: Ambrose Thelwall
- 1711: Edward Wynne of Llanyfydd
- 1712: John Wynne of Melai
- 1713: John Chambres of Plas Chambres
- 1714: Sir Thomas Cotton, 2nd Baronet of Lleweni Hall
- 1715: John Williams of Plas Isa, Llanyfydd
- 1716: William Carter of Kinmel
- 1717: John Lloyd of Trevor
- 1718: John Jones of Llwyn-Ynn
- 1719: Eubele Lloyd of Pen-y-Lan
- 1720: John Lloyd of Fox Hall
- 1721: Thomas Pryce of Glyn
- 1722: Henry Roberts of Rhydonen
- 1723: Thomas Hughes of Penbedw
- 1724: John Puleston of Hafod-y-Wern
- 1725: Henry Powell of Glan-y-Wern
- 1726: Edward Salusbury of Galltfaenan
- 1727: Humphrey Brereton of Borras
- 1728: William Wynne of Rhos
- 1729: Maurice Wynne of Llwyn
- 1730: Robert Morris of Ystrad
- 1731: Thomas Salusbury of Erbistock
- 1732: Robert Ellis of Groes-newydd
- 1733: Robert Price of Bathafarn Park
- 1734: Richard Williams of Penbedw
- 1735: Humphrey Parry of Pwllalog
- 1736: Edward Lloyd of Plymog
- 1737: Edward Williams of Pont-y-Gwyddel
- 1738: John Jones of Isgwinant
- 1739: Cawley Humberston Cawley of Gwersyllt
- 1740: John Williams of Plas Uchaf
- 1741: William Myddelton of Plas Turbridge
- 1742: John Edwards of Gallt-y-Celyn
- 1743: Aquila Wyke of Marchwiel
- 1744: Edward Jones of Ddôl
- 1745: Robert Davies of Llanerch
- 1746: Thomas Lloyd of Fox Hall
- 1747: Robert Williams of Pwll-y-Crochon
- 1748: Robert Wynne of Garthmeilio
- 1749: John Mostyn of Segroit
- 1750: Thomas Jones of Llantisilio
- 1751: John Holland of Tyrdan
- 1752: John Jones of Llwyn-Ynn
- 1753: Kenrick Eyton of Eyton
- 1754: Edward Maddocks of Froniw
- 1755: Watkin Wynne of Voelas
- 1756: Maurice Jones of Gelligynan
- 1757: John Lloyd of Hafogunos
- 1758: Robert Wynne of Dyffryn Aled
- 1759: Hugh Clough of Glan-y-Wern
- 1760: Griffith Speed of Wrexham
- 1761: Pierce Wynne of Llanichan
- 1762: Simon Thelwall of Blaen Yale
- 1763: Robert Wynne of Henllan
- 1764: William Dymock of Wrexham
- 1765: Thomas Kyffin of Maenan
- 1766: Evan Lloyd Vaughan of Bodidris
- 1767: John Davies of Llanerch
- 1768: Edward Lloyd of Trevor
- 1769: Robert Wynne of Garthewin
- 1770: Richard Price Thelwall of Bathafarn Park
- 1771: John Vaughan of Groes
- 1772: Peter Davies of The Grove
- 1773: Edward Lloyd of Royden Hall died and was replaced by Sir Edward Pryce Lloyd, 1st Baronet of Pengwern
- 1774: Williams Jones of Wrexham Fechan
- 1775: Richard Parry of Llanrhaiadr
- 1776: John Humberston Cawley of Gwersyllt
- 1777: Robert Foulkes of Gwernygron
- 1778: John Foulkes of Eriviatt
- 1779: David Roberts of Kinmel
- 1780: William Thomas of Bryncaredig
- 1781: The Hon Thomas FitzMaurice of Lleweni
- 1782: Sir Thomas Tyrwhitt Jones, 1st Baronet of Carreghofa died and replaced by Richard Clough of Glan-y-Wern
- 1783: Charles Goodwin of Burton
- 1784: John Ellis of Eyton
- 1785: John Twigge of Borras
- 1786: Philip Yorke of Erddig
- 1787: Sir Foster Cunliffe, 3rd Baronet of Acton
- 1788: Richard Wilding of Prestatyn
- 1789: Charles Brown of Marchwiel
- 1790: Edward Lloyd of Cefn
- 1791: John Jones of Cefn Coch
- 1792: Thomas Jones of Llantisilio Hall
- 1793: Edward Eyton of Eyton Hall
- 1794: Bryan Cooke of Hafod-y-Wern
- 1795: John Wynne of Gerwin-fawr
- 1796: John Hughes of Horsley Hall, Gresford
- 1797: Robert Hesketh of Gwrych
- 1798: John Jones of Pen-y-Bryn, Ruabon
- 1799: John Wilkinson of Brymbo Hall

=== 19th century ===
- 5 February 1800: John Wynne, of Coed Coch
- 11 February 1801: Edward Lloyd Lloyd, of Penylan
- 17 March 1801: John Meredith Mostyn, of Segroit
- 3 February 1802: Edward Lloyd Lloyd, of Penylan
- 10 February 1802: Daniel Leo, of Llanerch-y-Park
- 3 February 1803: Lord William Beauclerk, of Bathafarn Park
- 16 February 1803: Henry Ellis Boates, of Rose Hill
- 1 February 1804: Robert William Wynne, of Garthewin
- 6 February 1805: Samuel Ryley, of Marchwiel
- 1 February 1806: Richard Jones, of Belan Place
- 4 February 1807: Simon Yorke, of Erddig
- 3 February 1808: Richard Henry Kenrick, of Nantclwyd Hall
- 6 February 1809: Joseph Ablett, of Llanbedr Hall
- 31 January 1810: Richard Lloyd, of Bronhaulog
- 8 February 1811: John Wynne, of Garthmeilio
- 24 January 1812: William Edwards, of Hendre House
- 10 February 1813: Thomas Griffiths, of Wrexham
- 4 February 1814: Edward Rowland, of Gardden Lodge
- 13 February 1815: Charles Wynne Griffith Wynne, of Pentrefoelas
- 1816: Edward Edwards of Cerrig Llwydion
- 1817: Pierce Wynne Yorke of Duffryn Aled
- 1818: Edward Lloyd of Berth near Ruthin
- 1819: John Chambres Jones of Bryneisteddfod
- 1820: John Lloyd Salusbury of Galltfaenan
- 1821: John Madocks, of Vron-iw
- 1822: Samuel Newton, of Pickill
- 1823: Sir David Erskine, 1st Baronet of Pwll-y-Crochon
- 1824: Richard Middelton Lloyd of Wrexham
- 1825: William Egerton of Gresford Lodge
- 1826: Thomas Fitzhugh of Plas Power
- 1827: John Price of Plascoch Llanychan
- 1828: Lloyd Hesketh Bamford Hesketh of Gwrych Castle
- 1829: William Lloyd, of Bryn Estyn
- 1830: William Hanmer, of Bodnod
- 1831: Wilson Jones, of Gelygynan
- 1832: Edward Lloyd, of Cefn
- 1833: William Parry Yale, of Plas-yn-Yale
- 1834: Francis Richard Price, of Bryn-y-Pys
- 1835: Sir Robert Cunliffe, 4th Baronet, of Acton Park
- 1836: John Robin, of Tain y Graig
- 1837: John Heaton, of Plas Heaton
- 1838: Samuel Sandbach, of Hafodunos, Abergele
- 1839: Sir John Williams, 2nd Baronet, of Bodelwyddan
- 1840: Townshend Mainwaring of Marchwiel Hall
- 1841: Henry Ellis Boates, of Rose Hill
- 1842: Thomas Molyneux Williams, of Penbedw Hall
- 1843: John Townshend, of Trevallyn
- 1844: Henry Warter Meredith, of Pentrebychan, Wrexham
- 1845: Charles Wynne, of Garthmeilio, near Cerrigydriudion
- 1846: Brownlow Wynne Wynne, of Garthewin, near Abergele
- 1847: Richard Lloyd Edwards, of Bronhaulog, Abergele
- 1848: Simon Yorke, of Erddig
- 1849: Thomas Griffith, of Trevalyn Hall
- 1850: John Burton, of Minera Hall, Wrexham
- 1851: Thomas Hughes, of Astrad Hall
- 1852: Francis James Hughes, of Acton House, Wrexham
- 1853: Peirce Wynne Yorke, of Dyffryn Aled
- 1854: Richard Jones, of Bellan Place, Ruabon
- 1855: Henry Robertson Sandbach, of Hafodunos, Abergele
- 1856: John Jesse, of Llanbedr Hall, Ruthin
- 1857: John Edward Madocks, of Glan-y-Wern
- 1858: John Jocelyn Ffoulkes, of Erriviatt
- 1859: Thomas Lloyd Fitzhugh, of Plas Power, Wrexham
- 1860: James Hardcastle, of Penylan, near Ruabon
- 1861: Charles John Tottenham, of Berwyn House, near Llangollen
- 1862: Sir Hugh Williams, 3rd Baronet, of Bodelwyddan
- 1863: John Lloyd of Rhagatt, Corwen
- 1864: John Lloyd Wynne, of Coed Coch, Abergele was initially named, but was replaced by Boscawen Trevor Griffith, of Trevalyn Hall, Wrexham
- 1865: John Lloyd Wynne, of Coed Coch, Abergele
- 1866: Robert Bamford Hesketh, of Gwrych Castle, Abergele
- 1867: Philip Henry Chambres, of Llysmeirchion
- 1868: Sir Robert Cunliffe, 5th Baronet of Acton Park, near Wrexham
- 1869: Charles Wynne-Finch, of Voelas
- 1870: John Richard Heaton, of Plas Heaton
- 1871: Samuel Pearce Hope, of Marchwiel Hall
- 1872: William Cornwallis-West, of Ruthin Castle
- 1873: James Hassall Foulkes, of Llay Place
- 1874: John Carstairs Jones, of Gelligynan
- 1875: William Chambres, of Dolben
- 1876: Thomas Barnes, of The Quinta, Oswestry
- 1877: Henry Potts, of Glanravon, Mold
- 1878: James Goodrich, of Eyarth House, Ruthin
- 1879: Richard Myddeltoh Biddulpb of Chirk Castle, Chirk
- 1880: Tom Naylor Leyland, of Nantclwyd Hall, Ruthin,
- 1881: Oliver Burton, of Gwaenynog, Denbigh
- 1882: John Fairfax Jesse, of Caerfron, Llanbedr, Ruthin
- 1883: George Allanson Cayley, of Llannerch, St Asaph,
- 1884: William Douglas Wynne Griffith, of Garn, Trefnant
- 1885: Hugh Robert Hughes, of Ystrad, Denbigh,
- 1886: Colonel Henry Warter Meredith, of Pentrebychan Hall, Wrexham.
- 1887: Henry Davis Pochin, of Bodnant Hall, Eglwysbach,
- 1888: Captain John Charles Best, of Plas-yn-vivod, Llangollen
- 1889: Charles William Townshend of Trevalyn, Wrexham
- 1890: Sir Herbert Lloyd Watkin Williams-Wynn, 7th Baronet of Wynnstay, Ruabon
- 1891: John Robert Burton, of Minera Hall, near Wrexham
- 1892: James Coster Edwards of Trevor Hall, near Ruabon
- 1893: Edward William Lloyd Wynne of Coed Coch
- 1894: Edward Evans, of Bronwylfa, Wrexham
- 1895: Philip Yorke of Erddig, Wrexham
- 1896: Edward Owen Vaughan Lloyd of Rhagatt, Corwen
- 1897: Thomas Williams, of Llewcsog, Denbigh
- 1898: Sir George Everard Arthur Cayley, 9th Baronet, of Llannerch Park, St Asaph
- 1899: John Higson, of Plas Madoc, Llanrwst

=== 20th century ===
- 1900: Robert William Wynne, of Garthewin, Abergele
- 1901: Frederick Burton, of Gwaynynog, Denbigh
- 1902: William Charles Wynn, 4th Baron Newborough, of Plas Newydd, Trefnant
- 1903: John Morris, of Lletty, Llansannau, Abergele
- 1904: Robert David Roberts, of Bron-y-Graig, Corwen
- 1905: George Hunter Robertson of Plas Newydd, Llangollen
- 1906: Colonel Samuel Parr Lynes, of Garthmeilio, Corwen.
- 1907: Samuel Waring of Foots Cray Place, Foots Cray, Kent
- 1908: George Hunter Finlay Robertson, of Gladwyn, Gresford, near Wrexham
- 1909: Alfred Ashworth of Horsley Hall, Gresford, near Wrexham
- 1910: Godfrey Fitzhugh of Plas Power, Wrexham
- 1911: Alfred Hood of Strathalyn, Rossett
- 1912: Colonel Charles Salusbury Mainwaring, of Galltfaenan, Denbighshire
- 1913: Philip Henry Ashworth of Horsley Hall, Gresford
- 1914: Arthur Ernest Evans of Bronwylfa, Wrexham
- 1915: David Sanders Davies of Plas Castell, Cenbigfi
- 1916: Oliver Ormrod of Pickhill Hall, Wrexham
- 1917: George Benjamin Behrens of Vron Yw, Denbigh
- 1918: Colonel Thomas Gee of Hafodunos, Abergele
- 1919: Major Ernest William Tate of Pool Park, Ruthin
- 1920: Colonel John Edward Mellor of Tan-y-Bryn, Abergele
- 1921: Sir Albert Edward Herbert Naylor-Leyland, 2nd Baronet
- 1922: Henry Dyke Dennis of The Hafod, Ruabon
- 1923: Alfred David McAlpine of Marchwiel Hall, Wrexham
- 1924: John Frederick Burton of Gwaynynog, Denbigh
- 1925: Edward Lloyd Edwards of Trevor Hall, Ruabon
- 1926: Capt. William Piers Montague Jones of Llannerch, Trefnant
- 1927: John Evan Morris of Lletty'r Eos, Llansannan
- 1928: Capt. William Best of Vivod, Llangollen
- 1929: Major William Charles Barnford Williams of Llewesog, Denbigh
- 1930: Charles Loftus Watkin Tottenham of Plas Berwyn, Llangollen, Denbigh
- 1931: Sir Edmund Fleming Bushby of Bronwylfa Hall, Wrexham
- 1932: Godfrey Edmund Fitzhugh of Plas Power, Wrexham
- 1933: Charles Blades Coverdale Storey of Plas Nantyr, Glyn Ceiriog
- 1934: Ronald Stewart-Brown of Bryn-y-Grog, Wrexham
- 1935: William Horton, of Bryndinarth, Colwyn Bay
- 1936: Norman Hugo Graesser, of Argoed Hall, Llangollen
- 1937: Simon Yorke, of Erthig, Wrexham
- 1938: Edward Victor Horton, of Bryn Dinarth, Colwyn Bay
- 1939: John Lockett, of Maesmor Hall, Maerdy, Corwen, Merioneth
- 1940: William Rimington Glazebrook of Manley Hall, Erbistock, Ruabon
- 1941: William Hargrave Storrs, of Bryn Eithin, Colwyn Bay, Denbighshire
- 1942: Frederick Joseph Herzog, of The Grange, Rhewl, Ruthin
- 1943: Fairbank Howard Sutcliffe, of Hillcroft, King's Road, Colwyn Bay
- 1944: William Llewellyn Jones, of Bryn Eisteddfod, Glan Conway, Denbighshire
- 1945: Sir Edmund Ivens Spriggs of Plas-yn-Dre
- 1946: Wilfred John Heaton, of Plas Heaton
- 1947: Lionel Peckover Burrill, of Ty Côch
- 1948: Sir Watkin Williams-Wynne, 8th Baronet, of Belan
- 1949: Lt-Col. John Charles Wynne-Finch of Voelas
- 1950: Charles Melville McLaren, of Bodnant
- 1951: Lieut-Colonel Ririd Myddelton, of Chirk Castle, Cirk, Wrexham, Denbighshire.
- 1952: John Francis McLaren, of Old Bodnod, Talycafn.
- 1953: Captain John Oliver Burton, of Broadleys, Denbigh.
- 1954: Lieut-Colonel Sir Watkin Williams-Wynn, 10th Baronet of Dolben, St Asaph.
- 1955: John William Griffith of Garn, Denbigh.
- 1956: Captain Harry George Best, of Vivod, Llangollen.
- 1957: Francis John Watkin Williams of Llys Meirchion, Denbigh.
- 1958: Lieut-Colonel Arthur Weyman of Plas Gwyn, Ruthin.
- 1959: Lieut.-Colonel Sir William Guy Lowther, 5th Baronet of Erbistock Hall, Wrexham.
- 1960: Captain Norman Milne Hanrop, of Garthgynan, Ruthin.
- 1961: David Henry Fetherstonhaugh of Coed Bedw, Abergele.
- 1962: Major Peter Charles Ormrod, of Pea-y-Lan, Ruabon.
- 1963: Charles Edward Ifan Wynne Finch, of Tain-y-Maes Farm, Pentrefoelas, Betws-y-Coed.
- 1964: Captain Simon Croil Lloyd, of Garn, Denbigh.
- 1965: Nevill Edward Hill-Trevor, of Lledrod, Llansilin, near Oswestry, Salop.
- 1966: Brigadier Llewellyn Gwydyr-Jones, of River House, Erbistock, near Wrexham
- 1967: Richard John Heaton, of Plas Heaton, Denbigh
- 1968: Captain Peter Miles de Wend Greenwell, of Tregeiriog, near Llangollen
- 1969: Edward Michael Wynne Griffith, of Greenfield, Trefnant
- 1970: Lieut-Colonel Hugh Maurice Carstairs Jones-Mortimer, of Plas Newydd, Llanfair Dyffryn Clwyd
- 1971: Lieut.-Commander Arthur Frederick Whalley Boumphrey, of Maesmor Hall, Maerdy
- 1972: Mark Hurlbutt Burrill, of Ty Coch, Trefnant
- 1973: Peter Henry Bell, of Marchwiel Hall, near Wrexham
- 1974 onwards - See High Sheriff of Clwyd
