= Pant-yr-Ochain =

Country house and pub in Gresford, Wrexham, Wales

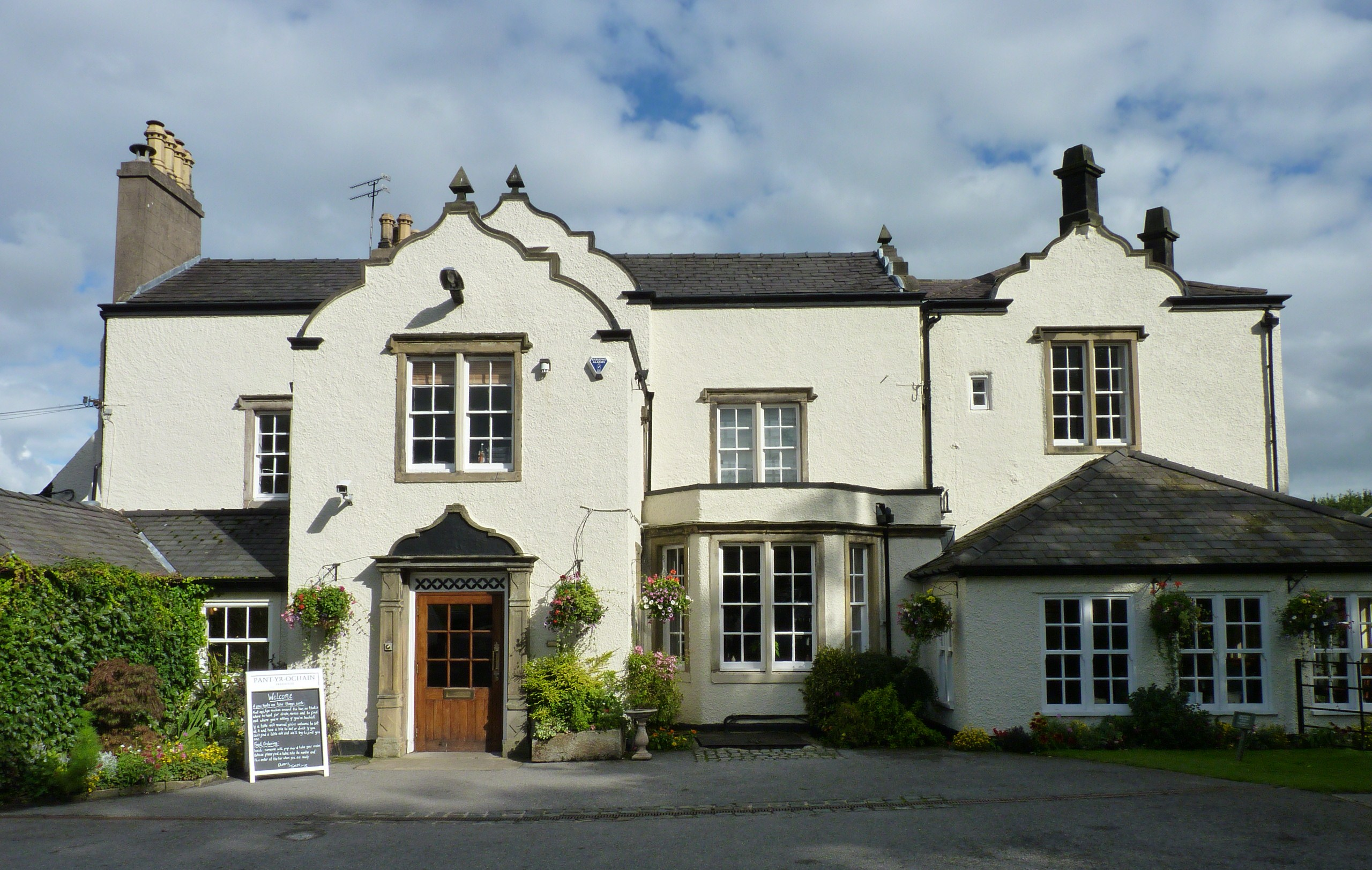
- Front of the main building, now a pub
- Interactive map of the Pant-yr-Ochain area
- Former names: Pant Iocyn
- Alternative names: the Pant

General information
- Type: Country house (–1963); Restaurant and/or Hotel (1960s–1990s); Sports bar (1992–1994); Public house (~late 20th century; 1994–)
- Architectural style: Neo-Jacobean
- Location: Gresford, Wrexham County Borough, Wales, The Pant-yr-Ochain, Old Wrexham Road, Gresford, Wrexham, Wales, LL12 8TY
- Coordinates: 53.07355°N 2.977416°W
- Construction started: 1530s (earlier building); 1550s
- Renovated: 1805 and 1835
- Owner: Brunning & Price (1994–present)

Technical details
- Floor count: 2

Website
- brunningandprice.co.uk/pantyrochain/

Listed Building – Grade II
- Official name: Pant-yr-ochain Hotel
- Designated: 3 June 1996
- Reference no.: 17694

Pant-yr-Ochain is a historic country house and public house, near Gresford, Wrexham, in North Wales.

The Grade II listed building is located in hilly terrain north-east of Wrexham, next to a series of shallow lakes, which also takes its name. There is a locally run miniature railway next to the building.

The current building is largely in the neo-Jacobean style, with the building dating to a building on the site from the 1530s–1550s known as Pant Iocyn, around the time it was under the ownership of Edward Almer. It was largely modified in 1805 and 1835 under the Cunliffes ownership, until 1878 when it (again) became part of the Acton Hall estate.

From the 1960s to the 1990s it became a hospitality venue, becoming a restaurant, hotel and pub in stages, and a sports bar in the early 1990s. The building is largely now a pub, operated by Brunning & Price since 1994.

== Description ==
=== Grounds ===
Pant-yr-Ochain is situated within its grounds, overlooking a small lake, while surrounded by "hills and hollows". The grounds also contain a lawn with picnic benches, parasoled terraces, and a garden. On a Ordnance Survey 1899 map, the garden contained a carriage drive, a walled garden, a kitchen garden, woodland, parkland, lakes, walkways, a lodge, a conservatory and possibly a formal garden.

=== Main building ===
The main current building largely dates from a 19th-century remodelling in 1835, which incorporated elements of the earlier structure. The house is described as "remarkable" due to its neo-Jacobean shaped gables, perhaps partly from the original structure.

The building is a manor house, or a country house, with a drive, and now houses a pub. The pub is largely situated in the 19th century part of the building. Alfred Neobard Palmer, a local historian, described it as "the chief house in Gresford", and more important than Acton Hall.

The existing building is in the Jacobean style of the Regency era with a slate roof and rendered chimneys. The building has timber framing, with some of the framing at the building's rear dating to the 17th century, while significant framing was applied in the 19th century. It is two storeys and situated in a L-shaped plan. A Cunliffe coat of arms is present on the building with the year 1835.

The interior was remodelled in the 20th century, but retains some 19th-century features such as panelled doors and shutters and a 16th-century inglenook fireplace. Some of the 17th-century timber framing is visible on the ground floor walls, and on the rear from the lawn. The pub's central room is dominated by a large double-front bar. There is also a garden room and a small snug (den).

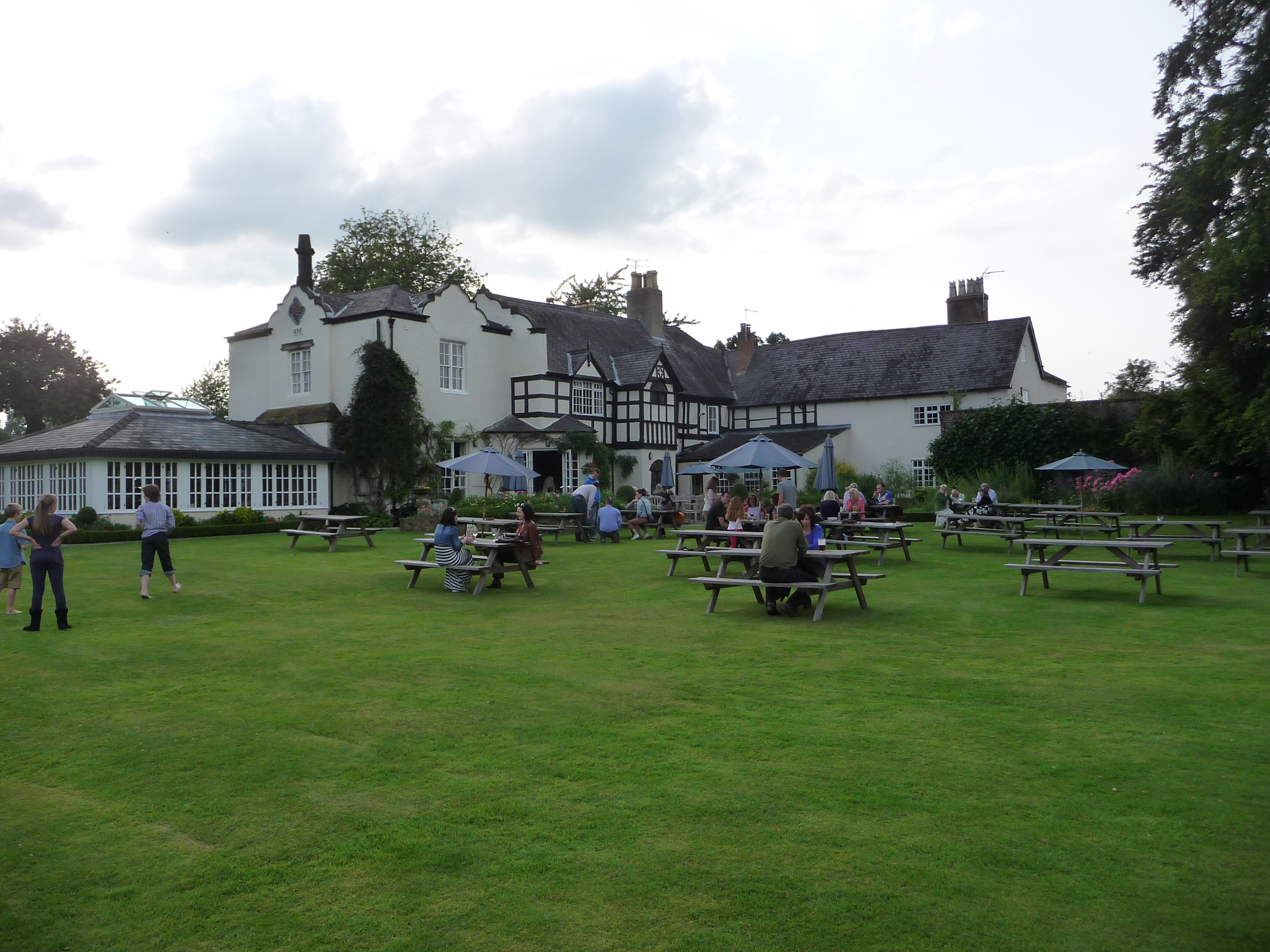
Back lawn of the pub, containing a seating area

Sketches of the house are held in Wrexham Museum.

=== Farmhouse ===
Behind the main building there is a farmhouse which pre-dates the 17th century. The farmhouse has separate access from Old Wrexham Road and is hidden from view from the hall by a long brick wall.

== Etymology ==
Pant-yr-ochain means the "hollow of lamentation", with the Ochain possibly linked to a feudal lord of the same name who lived in the area, but with no surviving evidence. It originally was known as Pant Iocyn (Welsh for 'Iocyn's hollow'). Iocyn, was a popular medieval Welsh Christian name, possibly derived from Latin jocundus, meaning "happy". There is no information on the particular Iocyn the building is named after, but possibly they may have been an early Welsh settler who came to the area in the early Middle Ages. The name Pant-yr-ochain first appeared in the 1830s, later adopted by the Ordnance Survey, although various forms of the older name remained in use until recent times. In maps from 1577 and 1610, the form Pentiocken was used, while in 1587 Pantyokin was used once.

It is sometimes nicknamed "the Pant", with Pant being a Welsh name referring to the hollow it sits in.

== History ==
The area was a Welsh settlement by the late 12th century, under Owain Gwynedd, and part of Powys Fadog.

There has been a building present on the site since the 13th century, and during the medieval times, a feudal lord known as Ochain lived there, although no recognisable evidence survives.

The building can trace its heritage to the 1530s; Tudor wattle and daub timber-framed walls of this era are visible from the modern-building's inglenook fireplace.

=== Edward Almer ownership (16th century) ===
By the 1550s, a house was built on the site known as Pant Iocyn. The site was under the ownership of Edward Almer, who served as the High Sheriff of Denbighshire in 1553 and Member of Parliament for Denbighshire in 1555, with Almer possibly moving into the house on the site, following his election as an MP, in around 1555. Although the house was possibly owned previously by a family under the name Carrat.

Almer either significantly modified an existing house on the site which was owned by the Carrats, or completely rebuilt the house. In the house's modification/rebuild Almer used materials belonging to his other house in Almere (then named Almer), located next to the River Dee, two miles (3.2 km) downstream of Holt. The house at Almere was low-lying and at risk of flooding, leading to Almer deciding to set up his gentry family at Pant Iocyn rather than at Almere, which Almer later sold, with it eventually ending up with the Puleston family. Although when he served as High Sheriff in 1553, Almer still stayed at Almere. Upon the accession of Elizabeth I in 1558, he had moved into Plas Iocyn.

During Edward Almer's stay in the building, and that of his son William Almer, who also became MP in 1572, Plas Iocyn, was said to have been one of the "chief gentry houses" in the eastern parts of Denbighshire.

Just before moving into the building, in the 1540s, Almer was accused of removing parts of Holt Castle for building his home, as well as embezzling rents and other sources of income for it. Almer argued that the materials he took were not originally of Holt Castle itself, and instead came from the dissolved monasteries from Valle Crucis and Combermere. It is possible that some of the materials were at least taken to Plas Iocyn.

In 1577, the house appeared on maps by Christopher Saxton as Pentiocken, which was also used on William Kip's 1610 map.

=== Intermediate ownership (17th century) ===
This house was also recorded as being present in 1592. This house was owned at the time by William Almer, the son of Edward Almer. It was then passed down to his daughter Jane, who married Gilbert Gerard, son of William Gerard. Jane's and Gibert's son, also named William, was said to have been in financial difficulty and had mortgaged Pant Iocyn for £1,000, and later sold it for £1,200 in 1613 to Nathaniel Owens. In 1614, it was sold again for £1,300 to John Panton. In 1615, it was purchased by Bishop of Chester, George Lloyd for £1,400, who died the same year. Lloyd's family stayed in the building until 1630, with his son David living in the building in 1620. The Lloyd ownership lasted until it was sold by Lloyd's widow, Anne, in 1630 to Thomas Manley, due to financial problems. In the year before, the lands of the house were valued to be worth almost £50 annually. Manley later improved the house.

In 1654, the house was sold to William Jones, who remained the owner by 1661, although the house was occupied by John Davies as its tenant by 1663. Upon Jones' death, it was sold to William Challoner, with Richard Challoner living in the house by 1668, the same year it was sold to Timothy Myddelton for £2,000. Myddelton's widow remarried Thomas Powell, and after her death, Powell remained living in the building until at least 1678. In 1670, hearth tax returns showed the house having fifteen hearths compared to Acton Hall's eleven, giving a possible idea of size between the two. Myddelton's daughter, Anne, married William Robinson in 1682, passing the house into Robinson ownership. During his ownership the house was listed in Edward Lhuyd's "list of notable houses in the parish of Gresford".

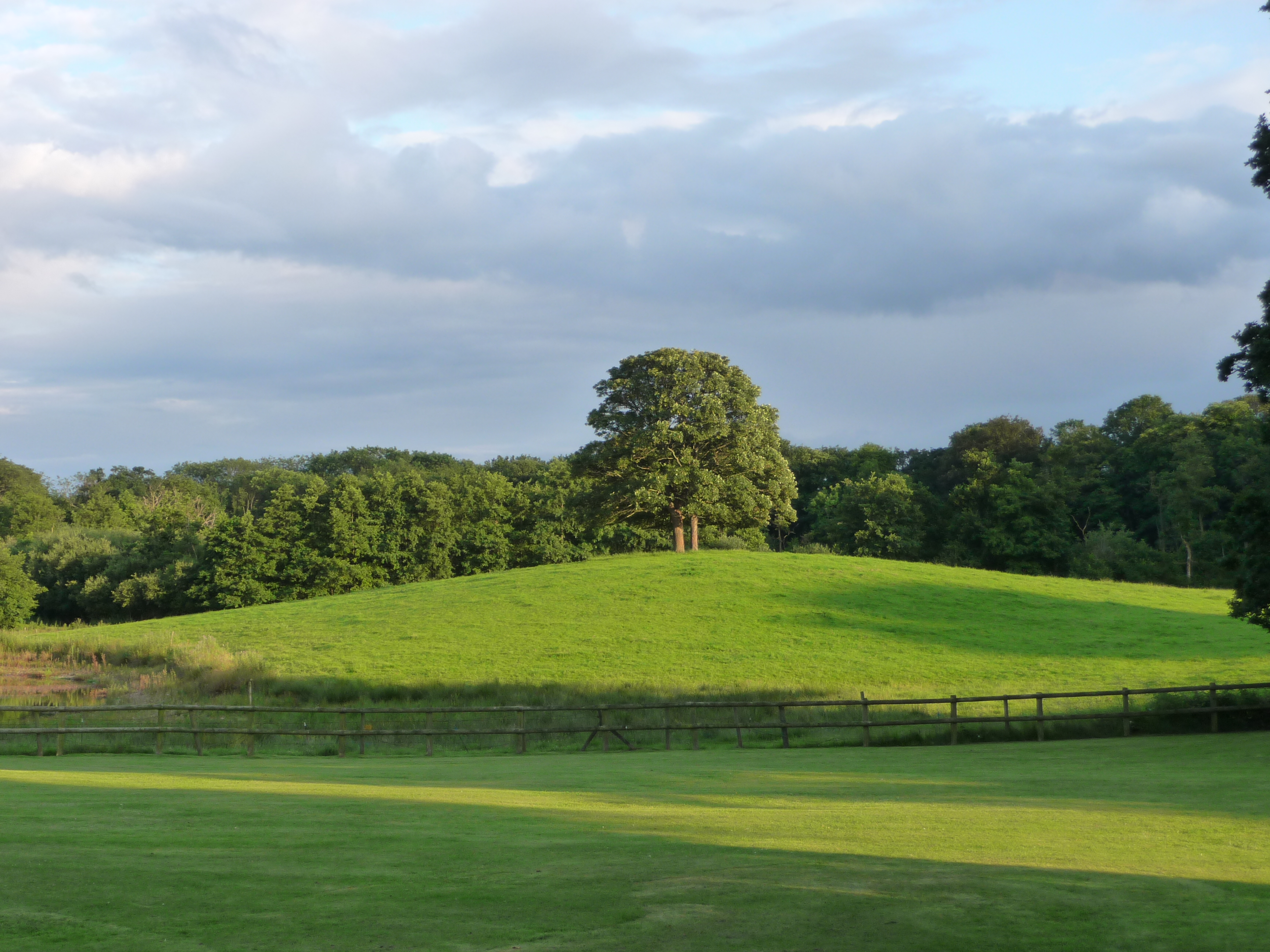
Hills from the building's (now as a pub's) garden

Originally in the 17th century, the building's grounds were surveyed to have contained a stable, brick kiln, three-bayed malt house, brewhouse, brick dove house, hop yard, a four-bay barn and a two-bay barn. While many of its fields had Welsh-language names, although the grounds in general were made of bogs and water-saturated. At the time it was surveyed the grounds contained two lakes, Pwll Gwenllian (now The Flash) and Llyn Llongmere, which is overlooked by the house. The grounds were also surveyed in 1620, to be around 96 customary/203 statute acres.

=== Jeffreys of Acton ownership (18th century) ===
From 1708 to 1921, the house and farm became part of the Acton Hall estate, following the marriage of John, son of William Robinson and Anne Myddelton, to Elizabeth, daughter of Griffith Jeffreys of Acton Hall, in 1708. At the time of the marriage, the house itself was occupied by someone named Solomon Russell. John and Elizabeth lived in Plas Iocyn until 1730, leaving for Gwersyllt, and their departure marked the end of the building being used as a "gentleman's residence", instead becoming a mere, and increasingly unimproved, tenanted farmhouse on the Acton estate.

Due to the Acton estate's inheritors being women, a 1745 private Act of Parliament, led to appointed commissioners, one of whom being Watkin Williams-Wynn, selling the families' estates, with Plas Iocyn sold in 1749 to Ellis Yonge for £1,395.

=== Cunliffe ownership (18th century–20th century) ===
Following Yonge's death, both estates, including the house, were bought by Foster Cunliffe in 1785, and the building remained under the ownership of the Cunliffes until at least 1903. Cunliffe referred to the property as Pant y Ochin, and aimed to build a new house on the site as a home for his daughters who were yet to be married, which if remaining unmarried were expected to leave the family home at a certain age. Cunliffe hoped this new house would be the choice of residence for his daughters, and should they not choose to live there "the house may be pulled down". Under Cunliffe's ownership, the house was substantially added to, aiming to become a "commodious dwelling" that expanded into the land, and it became two properties, the main hall and a farmhouse. For most of the 18th century the farmhouse was home to the Thomas family of farmers.

==== 1805 renovation by Foster Cunliffe ====
Cunliffe began renovating the building in 1805. One wing of the L-shaped farmhouse was enlarged with the addition of a Jacobean-style front, which now serves as the entrance to the pub, while the building's rear wing's roof was elevated to match the height of this next extension. A winding drive from Old Wrexham Road to the house was constructed. The style of the house may have been inspired by the "picturesque cottages" of the Trevalyn estate in Marford.

During the renovation, coins were discovered in the house dating to Charles I's reign, possibly relating to rumours that in 1651, John Jones Maesygarnedd, a regicide signee of Charles I's warrant, was to buy the house for £1,000. The architect for Cunliffe's construction of a new wing is unknown, although possibly a local man.

Cunliffe died in June 1834, possibly around the same time, his two unmarried daughters, Emma and Charlotte, moved into the renovated house.

==== 1835 renovation under the Cunliffe daughters ====
The house was remodelled substantially in 1835 by the two daughters, incorporating various elements of the earlier building. As part of their 1835 renovation, they extended the house by adding a large "pleasant room" (now the Library), which overlooked the lake, with the new extended gable bearing their arms with 1835 on it. The daughters also added the current porch and bay windows to the building's front which remain there today. At the same time, the daughters decided to name the building its current name Pant-yr-Ochain, which appeared on Ordnance Survey maps from 1838 and after. Although the name change was not consistently applied until more recently, even by the sisters at the time, who may have still spelt and pronounced it the old way. The building also shortly appeared to be labelled as Plas Issa, on an 1844 tithe map, possibly to distinguish it from the farmhouse, which by 1844 was occupied by Francis Jones.

Following Charlotte's death in 1875, and then Emma's in 1878, ownership of the main building moved back into the Acton estate. In 1885, a fire destroyed many of the farm outbuildings on the site. The main building, the hall, was also let to tenants during this period. First, it was to Florence Ford, then in 1891, its tenant was Anita Sophia Fletcher, followed by William Busfeild in 1901, and Thomas Richard Cholmondeley in 1909, with his widow Margaret Herbert continuing to live in the building a short time after his death.

The earliest detailed illustration of the house by Philip Yorke of Erddig, is said to possibly date from the 1870s when it was included in Alfred Neobard Palmer's Thirteen Country Townships.

=== Post-gentry and modern history (20th century–present) ===
After World War I, and the decrease in power of the gentry, the Acton Park estate was slowly sold off in the 1920s. John Edward Jones bought the hall in 1921 from the estate's trustees, with Jones letting the hall to Ernest Bateson, who lived in it for 30 years. For five years in the 1950s, Reginald Rider, a local dentist resided in the hall. From the 1960s, there were various tenants, some stated to be "less than satisfactory", and during this time the hall caught fire "mysterious[ly]" during nighttime, although it was promptly put out by the fire brigade before any serious damage.

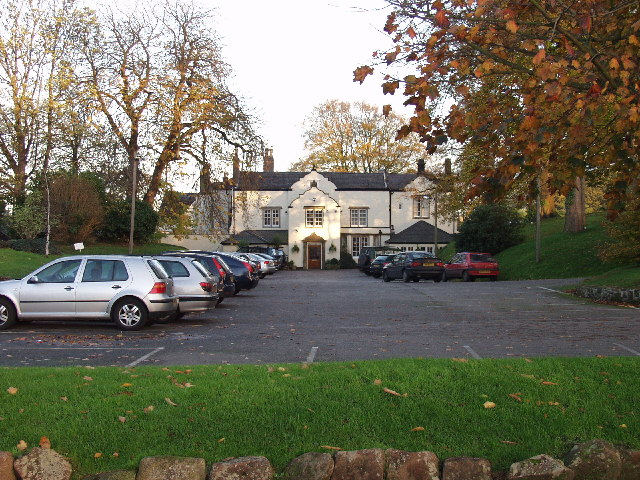
The entrance to the pub with a car park in front.

In 1963, the building became a restaurant, then a hotel, and then a pub, which changed ownership a few times. Between 1992 and 1993, it was owned by local nightclub owner Bob Scott, whose ownership led to the building being visited by many football players and supporters, as it possibly became mainly a sports bar, based on its interior.

In 1994, it was bought by Pubs Limited, later known as Brunning & Price, which performed a restoration of the building. The company claimed that when they bought the building it was "partially boarded up", with a leaking roof, and Sports Pub interior. Brunning & Price were sold to The Restaurant Group in 2007. The pub features in the 2018 edition of The Good Pub Guide and in The Pub Guide 2020, published by the AA.

There are reported ghost stories associated with the building.

== Lakes ==
Pant-yr-Ochain
- Pant-yr-Ochain Pools; Pant-yr-Ochain Lake
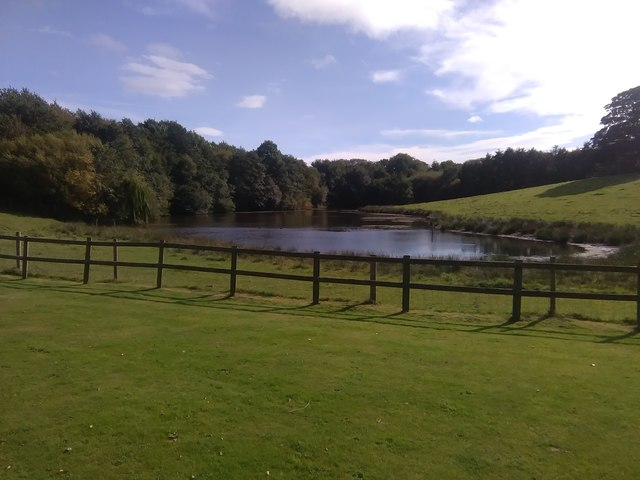
- "Pool 3" of the Pant-yr-Ochain pools, closest to the building, to its south-east

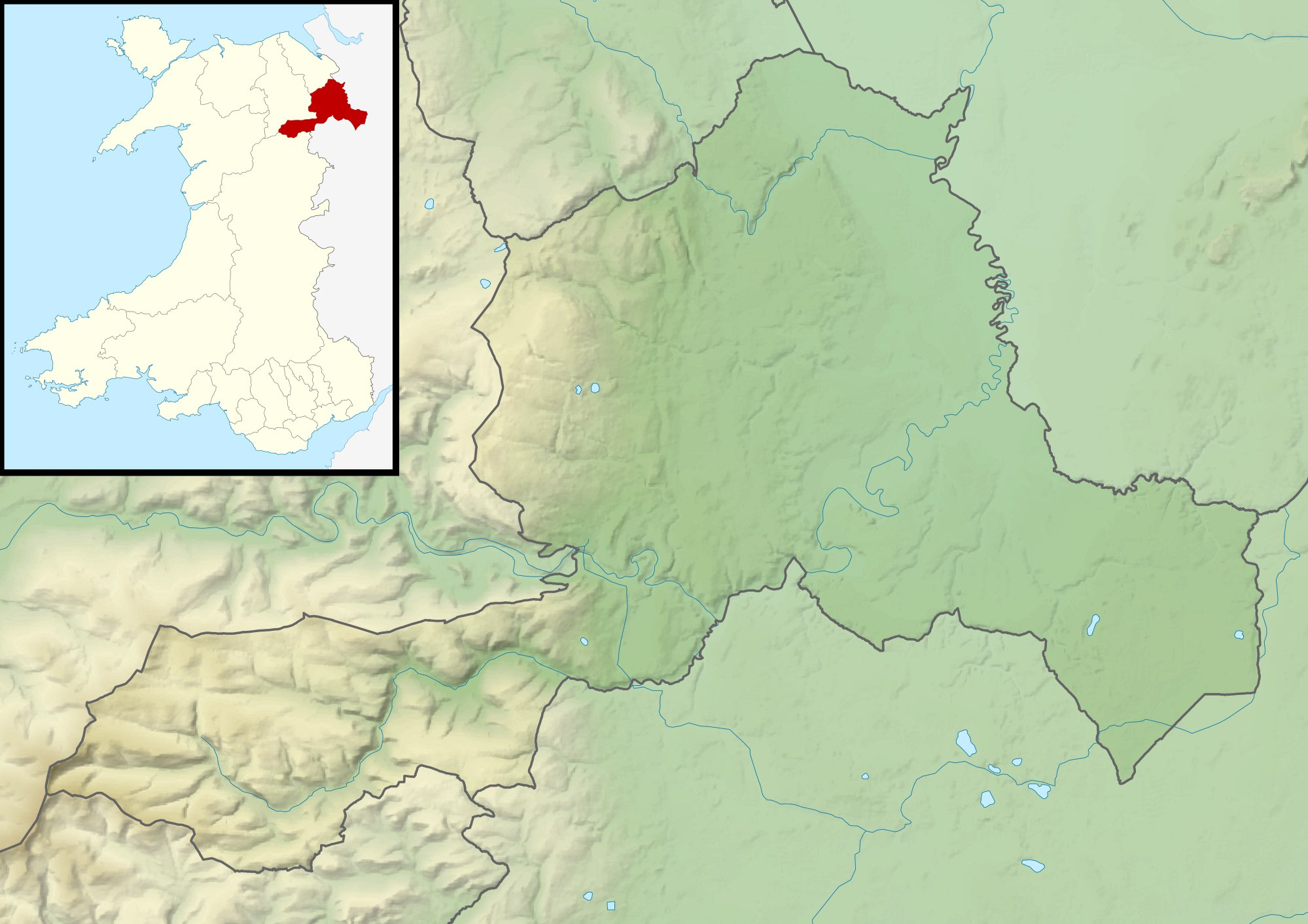
- Location within Wrexham
- Location: Gresford, Wales
- Coordinates: 53.069987°N 2.97241°W
- Type: Freshwater and ground-water lake
- Primary inflows: Ground
- Salinity: High

The building's grounds are home to several shallow lakes or pools, named collectively as the Pant-yr-Ochain Pools, of various sizes. Three of these pools were surveyed to be shallow, at a low altitude, with high alkalinity and moderate phosphorus levels. The pools are located far from the sea, and it has been theorised that the high alkalinity is due to saline levels in ground-water. All pools are situated in the north-east of Wrexham and have no conservation designation.

Of the three surveyed at low water levels, the largest pool (unofficially termed "pool 1"), has two main basins. Its northern section is up to 2.3 metres (7.5 ft) deep, while its southern basin is up to 1.9 metres (6.2 ft) deep. "Pool 1" is situated at an altitude of 78 metres (256 ft), with a 1.122-mile (1.805 km) shoreline, and overall shallow depth. The next largest pool ("pool 2") is situated west of the larger one, and has a flat bottomed basin. While the smallest of the three surveyed ("pool 3") is in the north-west section of the group of lakes and is 2.2 metres (7.2 ft) deep on its eastern edge. Pools "1" and "3", are used for angling.

In high water levels, all three of the pools become connected into one larger lake, sometimes named the Pant-yr-Ochain Lake. The pools' water levels are fed from ground-water systems, largely depending on the water table, and its levels fluctuate on a 15-year-long cycle.

When the nearby Borras Quarry was in operation, the levels of all lakes in the area were slightly lower. Historically, the term Llyn Llongmere, had been used to refer to the lake which is overlooked by the house. "Pool 3" is the closest to the house, although at higher water levels all lakes are interconnected into one.

"Pool 1", also known as the Pant-yr-Ochain Big Pool, does not contain any submerged aquatic plants, but has plants floating on its surface such as Nymphaea alba, an undetermined Nymphaea cultivar and Polygonum amphibium. Nymphaea alba is the most abundant one of the three floating plants identified. The pool also has some emerging aquatic plants. "Pool 2" was surveyed to not have any aquatic plants, possibly made harder to survey due to overhanging Alnus. "Pool 3", with the richest amount of aquatic plants of the three pools, had Callitriche stagnalis and Myriophyllum spicatum submerged, and Polygonum amphibium floating, with some emerging aquatic plants.

== Miniature railway ==
There is a miniature railway located next to the building. It is run by the Wrexham and District Model Engineering Society. The miniature railway provides miniature steam train rides, a full-size traction engine, as well as completed and partly-built model engineering projects.

== See also ==
- Erddig
