= Mersley Park =

Former medieval park in Wrexham, Wales

Mersley Park, also known as Marsley Park and later as Holt Parks, was a medieval park in the township of Allington, now in the Wrexham County Borough.

== Location ==
Mersley Park, also known as Marsley Park, and later Holt Parks was in the Allington Township, now in the Wrexham County Borough. The exact boundaries of the park are unknown. It has been suggested that parts of the park are identifiable from local name places, for example, Parkside, and Lower Parks. Parkside was a separate estate believed to border Mersley Park.

== History ==
Originally, Mersley Park was under the jurisdiction of the Marford Commote whose seat of power was The Rofft, Marford. In 1282, merging of the commutes of Marford, Wrexham and Yale created the Marcher Lordship of Bromfield and Yale. Later documents record that Mersley Park came under the Lordship of Bromfield.

Documented are some of the keepers of Mersley Park. Thomas Huxley (1397), Geoffry Legy (about 1506), and William Almer (about 1519). A Henry VIII letter, dated 2 August 1536, specifically mentioned the park:

Hugh David, a yeoman of the guard. To be keeper of Mersley Park in the lordship of Bromefyld, marches of Wales, formerly occupied by William Almer, and afterwards by Wm. Brereton, with 2d. a day and the herbage, &c. Also farm of a tenement near the pale, formerly used as a lodge of the said park lately in the tenure of the said William Brereton and now in the King's gift. Greenwich, 2 Aug. 28 Hen. VIII. Del. Westm., same day

The Tewderleyes Survey, made in the time of Henry VIII, also mentioned the park:

Marsley Parke in ye ffranchise of ye Holt, within one mile of ye Castle there, was then a faire Parke, being three miles about the same, being paled round with pales, w'h was more in Lawnes and plaines than Couert, the midst of ye said Paike being covered with Oakes and small Tymber, without any other Couert.

In 1595, the Court of Augmentations heard that the park comprised 625 acres. In the same year, Queen Elizabeth I leased the park to Sir Thomas Egerton, Master of the Rolls, and his sons Thomas and John. In 1620, John Norden’s Survey, for Prince Charles, later Charles I, stated that Mersley Park was leased to the Earl of Bridgewater. It consisted of 616 acres and shown on a plan as square shaped. The park was accessible through four gateways, Broade Way, Wrexham Gate, Bellis Gate, and Probyn's Gate.

John Egerton, later Earl of Bridgewater, succeeded his father, Sir Thomas Egerton. The Earl of Bridgewater purchased the estate from the Crown, on 3 July 1630. The Earl of Bridgewater was a Royalist during the English Civil War (1642–1651) and sold part of the park to Sir Edward Spencer and Sir Bevis Thelwall. The remainder of the park taken and sold by the State. Mersley Park was disparked in the 17th century, presumably sometime after the sale.

== Summary of the wardens / lessees / owners of Mersley park ==
- The Commute of Marford (Date: unknown)
- The Lordship of Bromfield (Date: post-1282)
- Thomas Huxley (Date: about 1397)
- Geoffry Legy (Date about 1506)
- William Almer (Date about 1519)
- William Brereton (Date: likely to be around 1520s / 1530s)
- Hugh David (Date: 1536)
- Sir Thomas Egerton, Master of the Rolls, and his sons Thomas and John (1595)
- John Egerton, as above, later Earl of Bridgewater (1630)
- Sir Edward Spencer and Sir Bevis Thelwall (owned part of the park, about 1640s)
- The Crown / State (Date: post 1649)

== See also ==
- Alfred Neobard Palmer local history author
