= John Alexander Fraser Roberts =

Welsh geneticist and psychiatrist (1899–1987)

John Alexander Fraser Roberts CBE FRS FRSE FRCP FRCPsych FRAI

Personal details
- Born: 8 September 1899 Foxhall, Henllan, Denbighshire, Wales
- Died: 15 January 1987 (aged 87)
- Occupation: Geneticist, psychiatrist

John Alexander Fraser Roberts (8 September 1899 – 15 January 1987) was a Welsh geneticist and psychiatrist.

== Life ==
He was born on 8 September 1899 at Foxhall, Henllan, near Denbigh, north-east Wales, the first son of Robert Henry Roberts (1868–1951) a farmer, and his wife, Elizabeth (Lily) Mary Fraser. His mother was the daughter of Alexander Fraser of Caernarfon, from a long line of Scottish Highland drapers. He was educated at Denbigh Grammar School. His studies of Sciences at Bangor University where interrupted by the First World War during which (due to age) he served only in the final year, as a 2nd Lieutenant in the Royal Welsh Fusiliers. Returning to Bangor he graduated BSc in 1920. He then went to Cambridge University graduating BA in 1922 and MA in 1925. With these new gained qualifications he joined the staff of Burden Mental Research Department at Stoke Park Colony in Bristol.

He then won a place at the University of Edinburgh as a postgraduate first gaining a doctorate (DSc) in 1933 then studying medicine and graduated with a MB ChB in 1936.

In 1926, aged 26, he was elected a Fellow of the Royal Society of Edinburgh. His proposers were Francis Albert Eley Crew, James Cossar Ewart, James Hartley Ashworth, and Alexander Lauder. In 1963 he was elected a Fellow of the Royal Society of London.

In the Second World War, he served as a surgeon commander in the Royal Navy Volunteer Reserve. From 1942, he acted as a consultant on medical statistics to the Royal Navy.

After the war he returned to the Stoke Park Colony as Director of the Burden Mental Research Department, staying there until 1957. In 1964 he was appointed Geneticist at the Paediatric Research Unit of Guy's Hospital Medical School in London. From 1957 to 1959 he was President of the Royal Anthropological Institute of Great Britain and Ireland.

He retired in 1981 and died on 15 January 1987.

== Family ==
In 1941, he married Welsh actress Doris Hare and they were married 32 years until their divorce in 1973. The marriage produced two daughters. After divorcing, he married Margaret Ralph in 1975.

== Publications ==
- An Introduction to Medical Genetics (1940) with later editions
