= Eriviat Hall =

Country house in Denbighshire, Wales

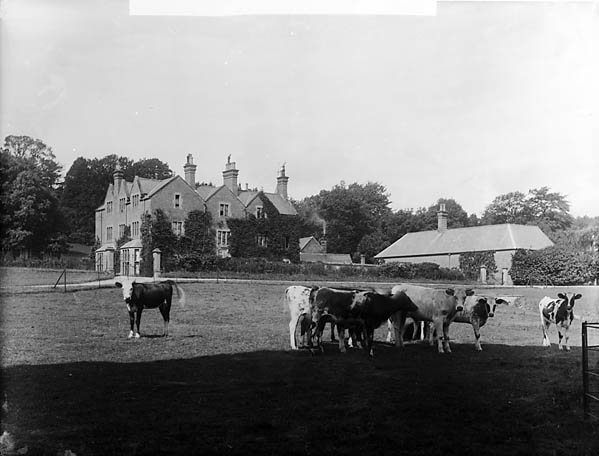
- Old Photograph of Cattle at Eriviat Hall
- Interactive map of the Eriviat Hall area
- Alternative names: Eriviat

General information
- Type: Private Residence
- Architectural style: Vernacular
- Location: Henllan, United Kingdom
- Coordinates: 53.1823°N 3.4776°W
- Construction started: Medieval and 19th Century

Design and construction
- Designations

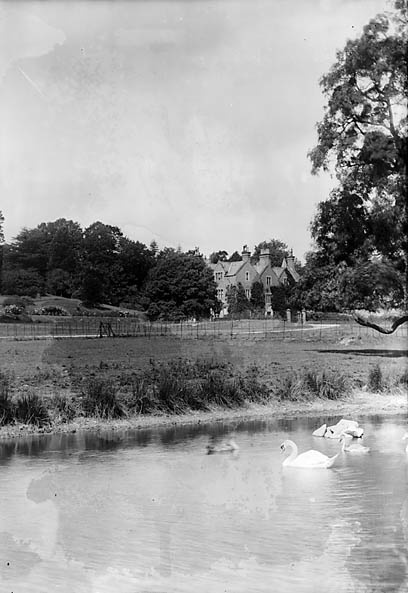
Eriviat Hall and Gardens

Eriviat Hall is a historic country house set in a 10-acre estate in Henllan, Denbighshire, United Kingdom, which was the home of the Ffoulkes family and their descendants from the Middle Ages until the early twentieth century. The property is now privately owned by a British businessman.

== History ==
Eriviat was associated with the Foulkes family for over 10 generations from the Middle Ages. One of the first owners was Ednyfed ap Goronwy Llwyd (fl.1457). His son was Einion Llwyd. Ednyfed's great-great-grandson was Thomas ap Goronwy (fl.1524–45) whose son, ffoulke ap Thomas ap Goronwy (fl.1539–73), provided the family with its original name, Foulkes.

The estate passed through several generations until the death of Robert ffoulkes in 1728. His brother Peter's fifth son, John ffoulkes (1699–1758), also acquired by marriage the Rhydonen estate in Llantysilio, Denbighshire, through his marriage with Catherine, daughter and heir of Henry Roberts.

Later owners included John ffoulkes (1736–1814), John Powell ffoulkes (1770–1826) and John Jocelyn ffoulkes (1813–58) whose second daughter Edith Caroline married P.H. Humberston of Glan y Wern, Denbighshire. It has hosted the actor Kit Harington amongst others such as Kiell Smith-Bynoe of "Ghosts" fame .

As of 2021, it was on the market for £1.5m and subsequently sold to a British businessman and his wife.

== Architecture ==
The original house may have dated from c.1467. The present house is a brick-built two-storey house. The entrance elevation has a three-gable, four-window front, and the remaining windows have mullions and transoms.
