= The Rofft =

Former hillfort in Wrexham, Wales

Coordinates: 53°05′50″N 2°57′42″W

The Rofft was a historic site at Marford in the Wrexham County Borough. It was initially a pre-historic camp, and later a motte and bailey castle. There are no visible remains of the site today.

== Pre-Norman Conquest (1066) ==
The Rofft was initially the site of an Iron Age fort encompassing about 30 acres (12 ha). Its strategic position, on a flat-top promontory providing views towards Pulford, has been suggested as the reason for its continued use. Seventh-century Welsh sources stated that Pulford was the Welsh boundary with the Kingdom of Mercia. The Rofft fort, with the nearby small forts of Caer Alyn and Y Gaer, guarded the approach to the River Alyn valley and the Rofft had local administrative and judicial functions for the commote of Marford.

== Post-Norman Conquest ==
In 1071, William I gave the Earldom of Chester to Hugh d’Avranches, including modern-day Marford. The Domesday Book (1086) records that the Norman lord Osbern Fitz Tesso controlled the commote of Marford and Hoseley. The construction of the motte and bailey castle at the Rofft may reflect a desire to widen Norman influence in the area. The bailey was calculated to be 18 feet (5.5 m) higher than the natural ground level and protected by a dry moat. Documentary evidence about the castle is vague and disputed, but it is said to have been severely damaged in March 1140, and rebuilt by Madog ap Maredudd, along with the castles at Doddington, Pulford and Wrexham. However, these accounts may refer to Wrexham Castle, in which case the first confirmed written reference to the Rofft comes from 1161–62.

The view west from near the site of The Rofft over the Cheshire Plain

An administrative task related to the castle was the collection of tolls at the nearby Pant Olwen. The presence of the Rofft influenced the local environment. It initially controlled the medieval Mersley Park, in a subdivision known as Horsley. Religion was focused at St. Leonard's Chapel, the only nearby place of worship, and under the jurisdiction of the castle.

== The declining influence of the Rofft ==
Pratt suggests that a combination of events lead to the decline in the Rofft's importance. The completion of the stone castles, such as Dinas Bran at Llangollen by Gruffydd Maelor II, reduced the significance of the area's motte-and-bailey castles. Wrexham had become the centre of local trade. Changes in the local politics diluted the importance of the Rofft. In 1282, the commotes of Marford, Wrexham and Yale were combined to create the Marcher Lordship of Bromfield and Yale. The royal bailiffs moved from the Rofft to reside at Wrexham. In 1284, when William de Warenne received the Bromfield seisin, he chose to do so at Wrexham rather than at the Rofft. In the mid-13th century, the importance of the Chapel of St. Leonard lessened following the foundation of All Saints' Church, Gresford.

== Post-14th century ==
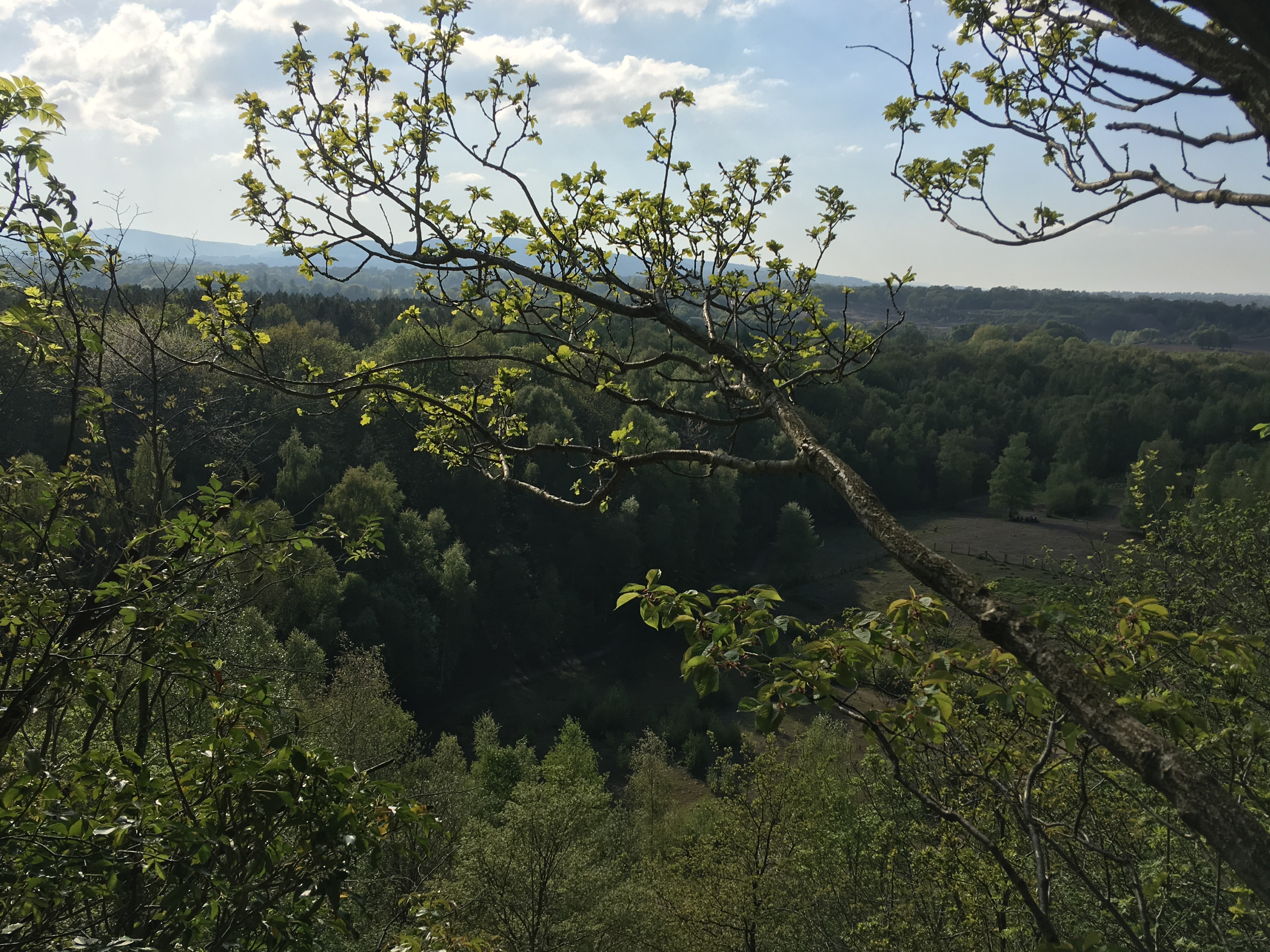
The view east into Wales, over the quarry, from near the site of The Rofft

A 1315 survey recorded a manor house on the Rofft bailey, and by 1575 Rofft Hall covered the site of the former Iron Age hill fort. In the 1840s the construction of the railway partially destroyed the Rofft earthworks and, between 1927 and 1958, gravel quarrying obliterated the Rofft site. The Rofft survives only in name: land near the Rofft is called Castle Croft, and the local primary school in Marford is called Rofft Primary School.

Mersley Park became associated with Holt, and latterly known as Holt Park, and was deparked in the 17th century. The remaining traces of the park are within the local names of places such as Parkside and Lower Park. The Chapel of St. Leonard stood until the 15th century; the site of the chapel is unknown but remembered through the road name Pont-Y-Capel.

== See also ==
Alfred Neobard Palmer, a notable local historian for the area of Wrexham
