= Edward Almer =

Welsh politician

Edward Almer of Denbigh and Gresford
- Born: 1516
- Died: 1574 (aged 57–58)
- Other name: Aylmer
- Occupation: politician
- Known for: member of the Parliament of England for Denbighshire

Edward Almer or Aylmer (by 1516 – 1574 or later), of Denbigh and Gresford, Denbighshire, was a Welsh politician.

He was a younger son of John Almer of Almer, Denbighshire, a sergeant-at-arms at the court of Henry VIII.

He was a justice of the peace for Denbighshire from 1543 to his death and was appointed High Sheriff of Denbighshire for 1552–53, 1557–58 and 1570–71. He was elected a member (MP) of the Parliament of England for Denbighshire in 1555.

He transferred the family seat from Almer to Pant Iocyn (now Pant-yr-Ochain), a house he rebuilt between Gresford and Wrexham using materials salvaged from his previous home.

He married Dorothy, the daughter of Sir George Calverley of Lea, Cheshire and widow of Robert Bostock of Churton, Cheshire. They had 5 sons and 3 daughters. He was succeeded by his eldest son, William Almer, also MP for Denbighshire.
