= Fulk Lloyd =

16th-century Welsh politician

Fulk Lloyd (c. 1515 – in or shortly before 1597) of Foxhall in Henllan, Denbighshire, was a Welsh politician.

He was a member (MP) of the parliament of England for Denbigh Boroughs in November 1554.
