= William Almer =

Member of the Parliament of England

William Almer of Pant Iocyn
- Born: fl. 1572
- Occupation: Politician
- Known for: Member of the Parliament of England for Denbighshire

William Almer (fl. 1572) of Pant Iocyn, Denbighshire, was a Welsh politician.

Almer was the eldest son of the MP, Edward Almer of Gresford, Denbighshire. He succeeded his father after 1574, inheriting Pant Iocyn (Pant-yr-Ochain) house at Almer, between Gresford and Wrexham.

== Career ==
William was a justice of the peace for Denbighshire from 1562 and appointed High Sheriff of Denbighshire for 1586–87. He served as a deputy lieutenant of the county from 1587. He was elected a member (MP) of the Parliament of England for Denbighshire in 1572.

== Personal life ==
He married Elen, the daughter of Piers Puleston of Hafod y Wern, Wrexham and had one daughter. Pant Iocyn passed to his daughter Jane, who had married Gilbert Gerard.
