= Marford =

Village in Wrexham County Borough, Wales

Coordinates: 53.099°N 2.958°W

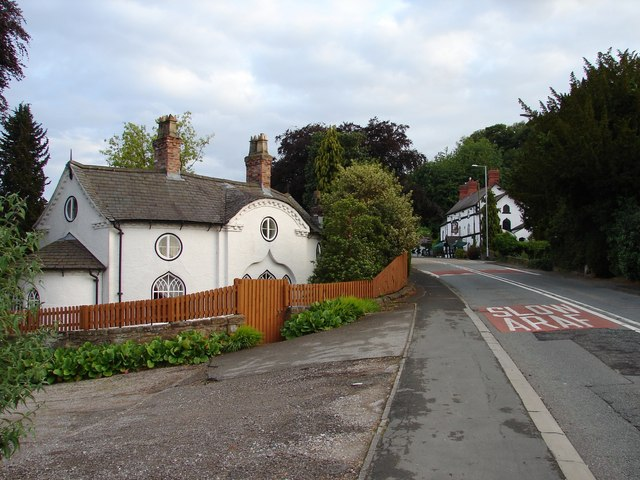
- Main road through Marford, showing a typical Gothic Revival house and the Trevor Arms

- Location within Wrexham
- OS grid reference: SJ359563
- Community: Gresford
- Principal area: Wrexham
- Preserved county: Clwyd
- Country: Wales
- Sovereign state: United Kingdom
- Post town: WREXHAM
- Postcode district: LL12
- Dialling code: 01978; 01244
- Police: North Wales
- Fire: North Wales
- Ambulance: Welsh
- UK Parliament: Wrexham
- Senedd Cymru – Welsh Parliament: Wrexham

Marford is a village in Wrexham County Borough, Wales, near the Wales-England border.

Marford covers some 750 acres (3.0 km^{2}), where the hills of north-east Wales meet the Cheshire Plain. Distant landmarks that can be seen clearly from Marford include Eaton Hall, Chester Town Hall and Cathedral. Beyond that on the Cheshire plains, Peckforton Castle and its hills form the skyline, with the outcrop of rock at Beeston Castle.

== History ==
Marford was formerly always pronounced and spelt Merford, and continued to be written as such on the township rate books until 1804. The name is English in origin, and may mean either the "ford of the mere", or refer to "mere" in its alternative sense of "boundary". The Rofft was the site of an Iron Age hill fort and later a motte and bailey castle. Due to the history of the Rofft no physical remains are visible at the site. At the time of the Domesday Book Merford was part of the English county of Chester, although it soon after became part of the Welsh kingdom of Powys Fadog. It returned to English administration in 1282, becoming under the manorial system part of Merford commote of the Lordship of Bromfield. It once formed a small enclave of Flintshire completely surrounded by Denbighshire. As the parish of "Marford and Hoseley" this status continued until the creation of the county of Clwyd in 1974. Formerly in the ancient parish of Gresford, in 1840 the township of Marford and Hoseley became part of the newly formed parish of Rossett.

A detached part of Marford (or Merford) township lay in neighbouring Rossett, next to the bridge over the River Alyn, until 1884. This contained the Marford and Hoseley tenants' mill, with the result that the building often known today as Rossett Mill is still confusingly, though more correctly, referred to as Marford Mill.

The rural area to the south-east of Marford was historically known as Hoseley. It was originally a separate township, and was recorded in the Domesday Book as "Odeslei" and later as "Hodeslei", meaning Oda or Hoda's lea (meadow). The name is still attached to several farms, roads and other features. There was an adjacent estate known as Horsley ("horse-pasture"), which is sometimes confused with Hoseley, although the names have different origins.

== Architecture ==
Marford is best known for its quaint looking Gothic revival cottages, built as part of the former Trevalyn Hall estates: the style is also called cottage orné. It has been described as "a delightful Gothick estate village" and several of its cottages have been listed by Cadw. Although a few are earlier, most were built at the end of the 18th until the beginning of the 19th centuries by George Boscawen, whose wife had inherited the estate. Originally the buildings were roofed in thatch, but were soon re-roofed in Bwlch yr Oernant slate, although some retain the distinctive roof lines of formerly thatched buildings. Many of Marford's houses feature crosses built into the design. A local folk tale states that these were included to protect the inhabitants from a ghost, supposedly the spirit of Margaret Blackbourne of Rofft Hall, who was said to have been murdered in September 1713 by her husband George Blackbourne, the steward of the Trevalyn estate. The original story having become garbled over the years, the ghost of Marford is often now referred to as "Lady Blackbird", and is said to tap at windows in the village.

== Today ==
Although still largely surrounded by farmland, Marford is now partly contiguous with the larger village of Gresford to the south-west, and forms part of the community of Gresford for local administration purposes. Marford and Hoseley is still, however, a separate ward of Wrexham County Borough, having a population of 2,458 at the 2001 census.

There are two public houses in Marford, one at the bottom of the Marford hill – The Trevor Arms (its name referencing the landowning family of Trevalyn Hall, the Trevors) – and the other at the top, The Red Lion. There is one shop, the coop which opened in June 2016, adjacent to The Red Lion. There are no places of worship, although there were two Nonconformist chapels; a Baptist chapel in Cox Lane and Wesleyan chapel on the old turnpike lane in the Pant. Both are now private houses.

The village also has a disused quarry which has become colonised by many interesting plants, moths and butterflies, including the dingy skipper and white-letter hairstreak: a small colony of the silver-studded blue, introduced from Prees Heath, Shropshire, in the 1970s, may now have died out. The quarry was originally opened in 1927 to provide materials for the construction of the Mersey Tunnel; quarrying ceased in 1971 when the 39 acres (160,000 m^{2}) were allowed to regenerate naturally. The area was designated a SSSI in 1989 and 26 acres (110,000 m^{2}) were purchased in 1990 by the North Wales Wildlife Trust as a nature reserve.

== See also ==
Additional information about cited local historian Alfred Neobard Palmer
