= John Puleston (MP, died 1551) =

16th-century Welsh courtier and politician

Sir John Puleston

Member of Parliament for Caernarfon Boroughs
- In office 1542–1544
- Monarch: Henry VIII

Member of Parliament for Caernarfonshire
- In office 1545–1551
- Monarchs: Henry VIII and Edward VI

Constable of Caernarfon Castle
- In office 1523–1551
- Preceded by: John Puleston (father)

Personal details
- Born: by 1492
- Died: 1551
- Spouse(s): Gaynor ferch Robert ap Meredydd ap Hwlcyn Llwyd; Sioned ferch Meredydd ap Ieuan ap Robert
- Children: at least 9, including Robert Puleston and Hugh Puleston
- Occupation: Courtier, administrator, landowner

Sir John Puleston (by 1492 – 1551) was a Welsh courtier, administrator, landowner, and politician. He held numerous regional offices under the Tudor monarchy, including constable of Caernarfon Castle, vice-admiral of North Wales, and sheriff of multiple counties. He also sat in the English Parliament for Caernarfon and Caernarfonshire during the reigns of Henry VIII and Edward VI.

== Background ==
Puleston was born by 1492, the eldest son of John Puleston of Hafod-y-Wern and Bersham, Denbighshire, by his first wife Ellen Whitney, daughter of Robert Whitney of Whitney, Herefordshire. The Puleston family originated in Emral, Flintshire, and were descended from Norman settlers near Newport, Shropshire. The Bersham branch acquired lands in Caernarfonshire, including Llwyn-y-Cnotiau, and became prominent in both counties.

His father had served at the Battle of Bosworth in 1485 and was appointed constable of Caernarfon Castle in 1506. Upon his father’s death around 1523, John succeeded to the office and other family estates.

== Career ==
Puleston began his royal service as a sewer in the chamber by 1513 and was appointed serjeant-at-arms later that year. He served in Henry VIII’s first French war as part of Viscount Lisle’s retinue.

He was constable of Caernarfon Castle from 1523 until his death, and by virtue of that post, also served as ex officio mayor of the borough. He held a wide range of administrative positions including:

- Sheriff and escheator of Merioneth (1533–40)
- Vice-admiral of North Wales (by 1539)
- Justice of the peace for Caernarfonshire (from 1540)
- Commissioner for tenths of spiritualities, coastal defenses, musters, and relief
- Sheriff of Denbighshire (1542–43) and of Caernarfonshire (1543–44)
- Chamberlain of North Wales (1547)

In Parliament, Puleston was elected MP for Caernarfon Boroughs in 1542 and for Caernarfonshire in 1545 and 1547. In the 1547 Parliament, he served alongside his son Robert, who sat for the boroughs.

He was knighted by 20 December 1546.

== Land and legal influence ==
Puleston was heavily involved in legal and property matters, including the lease of the ex-priory at Conwy in 1538 and the rectory at Eglwys Rhos. He also supported his daughter in a major inheritance dispute over the Penrhyn estate following the death of Edward Gruffydd in 1540, purchasing the wardships of his three granddaughters in 1544. He acquired additional wardships in Anglesey and Denbighshire, solidifying his influence in the region.

== Political rivalries ==
Puleston’s political life included a prolonged rivalry with Sir Richard Bulkeley, joint chamberlain of North Wales. The two clashed repeatedly during the 1530s, including over ecclesiastical appointments and property disputes. Nonetheless, they occasionally served together, such as during a 1539 inspection of coastal defenses.

== Marriage and issue ==
Puleston married twice:

- First, by 1526, to Gaynor ferch Robert ap Meredydd ap Hwlcyn Llwyd of Glynllifon, with whom he had four sons (including Robert) and five daughters.
- Second, to Sioned (or Jonet) ferch Meredydd ap Ieuan ap Robert of Dolwyddelan and Gwydir, widow of Edmund Gruffydd of Porth-y-Aur, Caernarfon. They had one son and three daughters. He also had one illegitimate son.

His son Hugh Puleston married Margaret Roberts of Llwyn-y-Cnotiau, continuing the family's legacy in that estate.

== Death ==
Puleston made his will on 14 January 1551, leaving lands in Denbighshire to Robert and those in Caernarfonshire to a younger son. He also left silverware, livestock, and featherbeds, indicating a comfortable household. His executors included the Earl of Wiltshire (William Paulet), Sir John Salusbury II, and John Wynn ap Meredydd. His will was proved on 27 February 1551.

== Legacy ==
Puleston’s prominence in Tudor Wales, combined with his court and parliamentary service, placed him among the most powerful figures in North Wales during the mid-16th century. He was succeeded in Parliament by his ally and executor John Wynn ap Meredydd.
