= Horsley Hall, Gresford =

Former Jacobethan-style house in Wales

Coordinates: 53.0886°N 2.9487°W

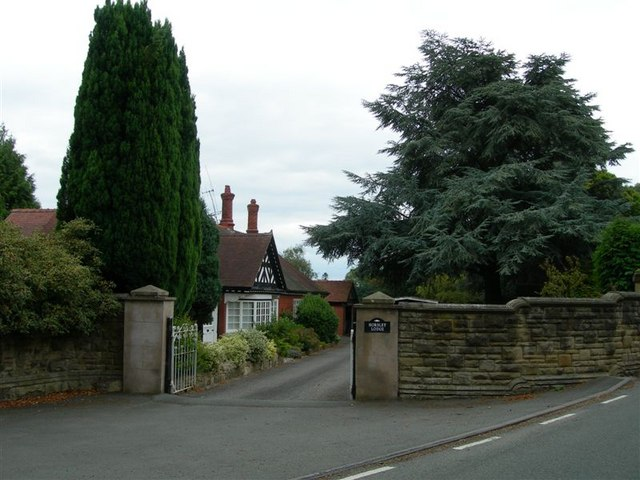
Horsley Lodge, a surviving estate building

Horsley Hall was a Jacobethan-style house with formal gardens, near to Gresford, Wrexham County Borough, that was destroyed in 1963.

== Pre-Victorian era ==
The first house built on the site around the early fifteenth century by Ieuan ap David ap Madog ap David Hen of Burton, otherwise known as Dafydd Hen of Burton. Ieuan Llwyd ap Gruffydd ap David Fychan inherited the hall followed by Howel ap David ap Gruffydd Fychan of Talwrn. The children of Howel ap David ap Gruffydd Fychan of Talwrn adopted the surname Powell. A succession of the Powell family owned the hall. Members of the Powell family who owned the hall included, in about 1540, Thomas Powell, the Constable of Holt Castle, who built 'Plas Y Horsli' a timber building surrounded with a moat on the site.

In 1792, John Hughes possessed Horsley Hall, with it passing to Dr Francis James Hughes. Townshead and Frederick Potts jointly bought the hall, but through a deal, Frederick Potts became the sole owner.

== Late Victorian era ==
In about 1875, the owner Frederick Potts demolished the timber building and replaced it with a stone building. He resided at the hall until his death in 1898. Between 1898 and 1910, Alfred Ashworth owned Horsley Hall. In 1906, he extended the estate by purchasing 700 acres of the adjoining Parkside estate. Between 1907 and 1912, the hall was enlarged, remodelled in a Jacobethan style, and had a formal garden laid out by the architect George Herbert Kitchin (1870–1951). In 1910, Phillip Henry Ashworth, his only son, inherited the estate.

In 1917, the hall was bought by Colonel Hall Walker MP and further improvements made to it. On 27 July 1933, Horsley Hall was sold by auction. The advertisement for the sale describes the Hall in detail. The hall had an outer and entrance hall, Saloon, hall with beamed ceiling, library, gallery, four reception rooms, 20 principle bedrooms and dressing rooms, theatre room, school room, 9 bathrooms, servants bedrooms, head grooms house, chauffeurs cottage, gardeners flat, stabling for 18 horses and 3 garages. Mentioned was the formal gardens and golf course. The sale also included the contents of the hall. On 5 July 1934, the remaining parts of the estate were due to be auctioned. In 1934 a decision was made to demolish Horsley Hall.

== Post-1939 ==
At the start of the Second World War, Horsley Hall was still standing and requisitioned by the army. During the war, it was for training and accommodation by Number 12 Camp, Royal Pioneer Corp. Built in the formal gardens were Nissen huts, garages and military building. On 20 April 1950, Horsley Hall was mentioned in the House of Commons when a Member of Parliament raised a question about Lance-Corporal Sankey, Royal Warwickshire Regiment, never seen again and reported as a deserter after leaving the camp on 25 September 1944. In 1955, the army left the site. Horsley Hall, for a short time, was used as a private school but demolished in 1963. Until 1978 a feature of the gardens was a baroque gateway from Great Buckingham Street, London, where Peter the Great once stayed.

Horsley Hall, and in the grounds, a dovecote and gazebo are Grade II listed buildings by CADW. The main reason for the listing is, "survival of a structure of an extensive Edwardian garden, with some massive rock work and a few fine ornamental trees". Some badly deteriorated parts of the hall remain, and the formal gardens are overgrown. The site is now privately owned with no public access.

The gardens are listed as Grade II in the Cadw/ICOMOS Register of Parks and Gardens of Special Historic Interest in Wales.

== People connected to Horsley Hall ==
Alfred Ashworth (1843–1910)

Alfred Ashworth was born in 1843. Between 1898 and 1910, he owned of Horsley Hall. He was known for being a Justice of the Peace, and in 1909 as the High Sheriff for Denbighshire. He was a long-term member of the Historic Society of Lancashire and Cheshire. On 21 October 1910, he died at Horsley Hall. In 1910, Phillip, his only son, inherited Horsley Hall.

Phillip Henry Ashworth

In 1910, Phillip Ashworth inherited Horsley Hall from his father, Alfred Ashworth. Between 1913 and 1914 he was the High Sheriff of Denbighshire. In 1917, he sold the hall.

Dafydd Hen of Burton

A son of Dafydd Hen of Burton was builder of the first house on the estate in the early fifteenth century.

Frederick Potts (1819–1898)

Frederick Potts was born on 4 July 1819. He was a solicitor and a local businessman. In about 1875, he demolished the timber building and replaced it with a stone building. He died at the hall on 5 June 1898.

Francis James Hughes

Francis James Hughes, a Doctor of Physics, and Justice of the Peace, was an owner at the Hall.

John Hughes

In 1792, he possessed the hall. Between 1796 and 1798 he was the High Sheriff for Denbighshire.

George Herbert Kitchin (1870–1951)

Between 1907 and 1912 George Herbert Kitchin was the architect responsible for remodelling the Hall into a Jacobean style and laid out the formal gardens. Amongst other places, he was the architect for developments at Lygrove House, also known as Lyegrove House, Sodbury, and Compton End, Winchester.

Lord Wavertree (Colonel Hall Walker)

In 1917, Colonel Hall Walker (later Lord Wavertree), became the owner of the hall.

Thomas Powell

A Constable of Holt Castle, who build 'Plas Y Horsli' on the estate in about 1540.

Thomas Powell

A resident of the Hall. Between 1591 and 1598 the High Sheriff for Denbighshire.

Thomas Powell

A resident of the Hall. Between 1616 and 1620 the High Sheriff for Denbighshire.

Thomas Powell

A resident of the Hall. Between 1684 and 1685 the High Sheriff for Denbighshire.

Sir Thomas Powell

A resident of the Hall. Between 1639 and 1640 the High Sheriff for Denbighshire.

Sir Thomas Powell

A resident of the Hall. Between 1657 and 1663 the High Sheriff for Denbighshire.
