= Borras =

Hamlet in Wrexham County Borough, Wales

Coordinates: 53.0683°N 2.9639°W

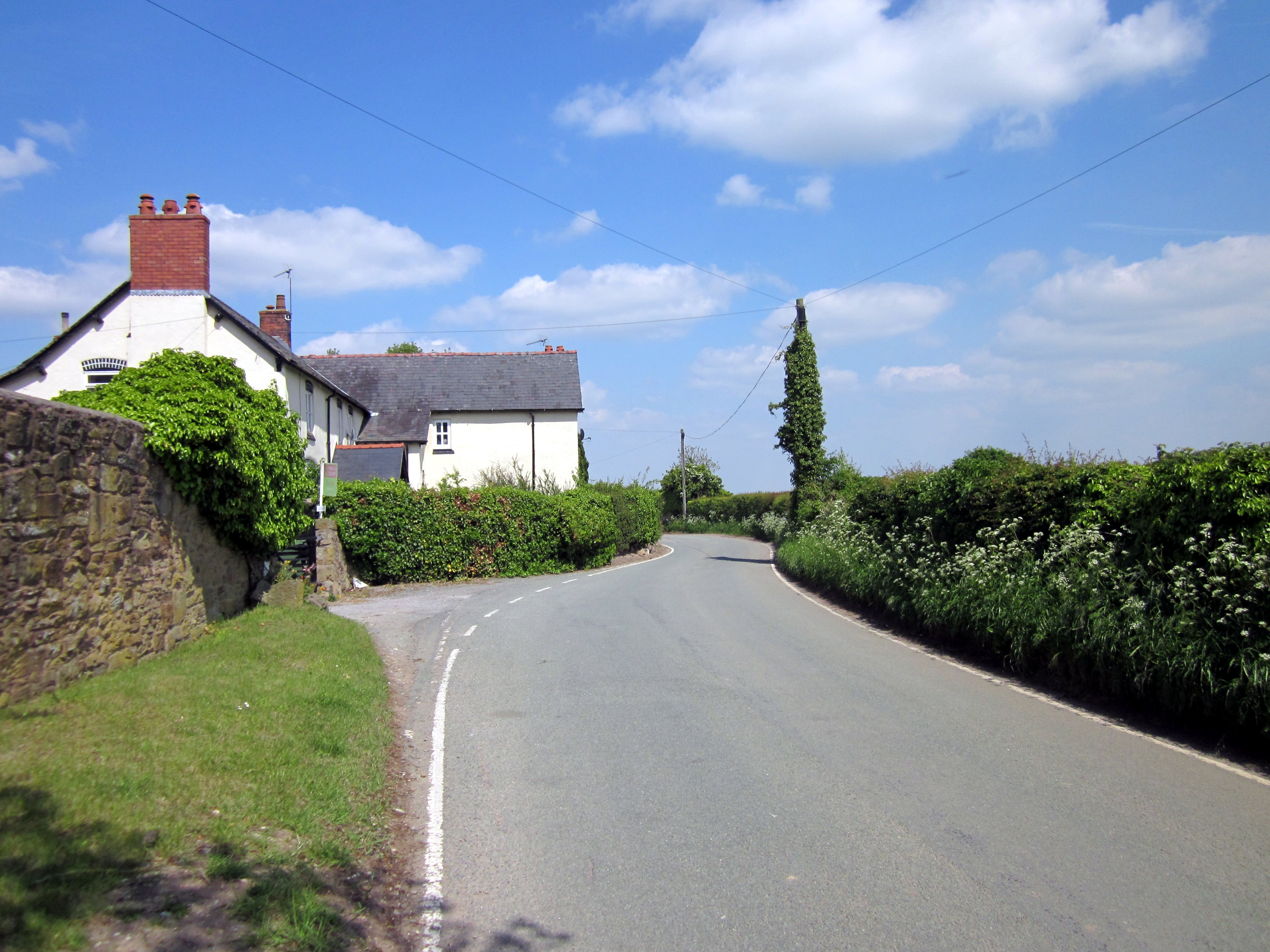
- Borras Road, near Borras and Borras Head.

- Location within Wrexham
- OS grid reference: SJ347522
- Community: Acton; Holt
- Principal area: Wrexham
- Country: Wales
- Sovereign state: United Kingdom
- Post town: WREXHAM
- Postcode district: LL13
- Dialling code: 01978
- Police: North Wales
- Fire: North Wales
- Ambulance: Welsh
- UK Parliament: Wrexham
- Senedd Cymru – Welsh Parliament: Wrexham

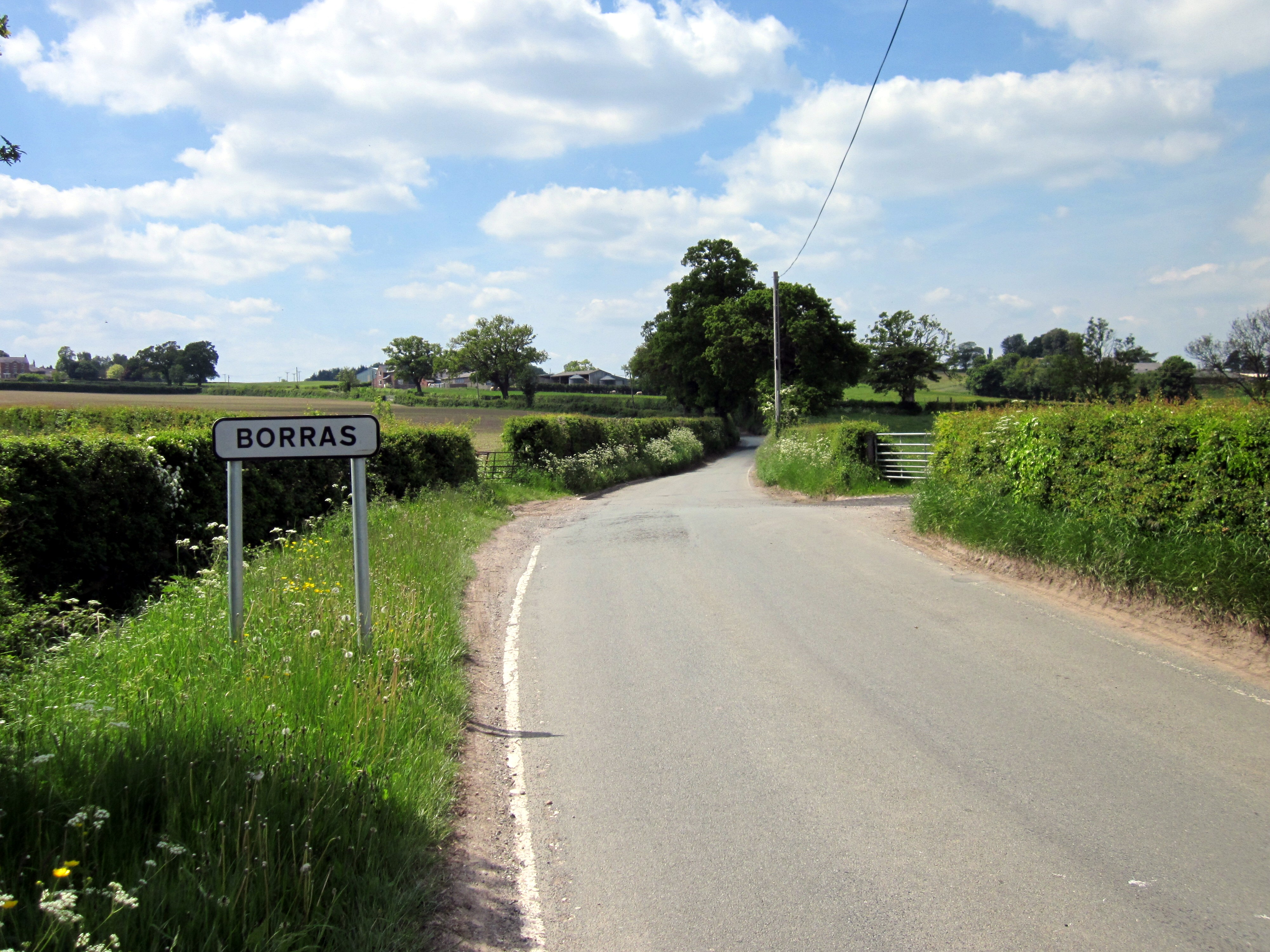
Road sign for Borras

Borras (Welsh pronunciation; historically Welsh: Bwras) is a hamlet in Wrexham County Borough, Wales to the north-east of the city of Wrexham. It is part of the community of Holt.

The nearby residential area of Borras Park is named after Borras; and is colloquially shortened to just "Borras", but is part of the community of Acton, in the city of Wrexham.

== Early history ==
Although no human occupation sites have been found, the area of Borras has revealed some of the earliest traces of habitation in the area. A number of Mesolithic flint tools have been found adjacent to Borras Farm. A Neolithic Axe head was also found near Bryn-Gryfydd and a hoard of Bronze Age metalwork.

During the Middle Ages, according to the Wrexham historian Alfred N. Palmer, Borras (then called Borrasham) formed two townships of the mesne manor of Isycoed, itself one of the manors of the marcher lordship of Bromfield; the townships were known as Borrasham Hwfa and Borrasham Riffri. It is known that an extensive farmed rabbit warren was in existence in the area at the time. Palmer noted that the name Borrasham was also written Burras or Borras (possibly from the Old English beorgas, "burial-mounds"), and that the latter forms came to be used for the township in order to avoid confusion with Bersham.

Borras Hall is an early 17th-century former manor house. It is believed that it replaced an early 13th-century house on the same site. In 1988 Madoc's lead seal was discovered at Burras Hall that dated to the 13th century and is believed to be the seal of the lords of Borras and Erlas who built Plas ym Mwras in about 1200. The seal was sent to Cardiff for verification and has never been seen since, on inquiring as to the whereabouts of the seal Cardiff stated that they only have a copy of the seal. The Hall was owned by the Brereton Family until 1789, when it was sold to a Mr Twigg for £40,000.00 and then later sold to Baron Kenyon for £24,000.00.

Nearby Borras Head House also dates to the 17th century and was also purchased by Lord Kenyon in 1803.

Bwras is said to be an alternative Welsh name for the place.

== Airfield ==
During the period 1917-1920, fields at Borras Lodge were used by Nos. 4 and 51 Training Squadrons/Schools of the Royal Flying Corps / Royal Air Force based at Shotwick (later RAF Sealand) and Hooton Park.

In the 1940s, the area was again pressed into service during World War II for training flights. Three grass runways of approximately 550 to 660 yards (500–600 m) existed. The main period of construction at the site was between December 1940 and June 1941.

The airfield was closed after World War II and, on 22 October 1959, was sold to United Gravel Company, a subsidiary of Alfred McAlpine. In the 1970s, quarrying operations commenced in the area.

== Bunker ==
Between 1962 and 1992 there was a hardened nuclear bunker, built at Borras for No 17 Group Royal Observer Corps North Wales, who provided the field force in Western Area of the United Kingdom Warning and Monitoring Organisation and would have sounded the four-minute warning alarm in the event of nuclear war and warned the population of Wrexham in the event of approaching radioactive fallout. The building was staffed by up to 120 volunteers who trained on a weekly basis and wore a Royal Air Force style uniform. After the breakup of the communist bloc in 1989, the Royal Observer Corps was disbanded between September 1991 and December 1995. However, the nuclear bunker remained and was purchased by R Jones (musician in the group K-Klass) of Tyn-Twll Farm in the early 1990s and converted to a recording studio. Between the ROC vacating the premises in September 1991 and its new use as a recording studio, the building was under preparation for use as the Home Office North Wales Regional Government Headquarters (RGHQ) although it is unlikely it was ever actually activated as such, given the short timescale.

== Borras Quarry ==
Borras Quarry is an active quarry site supplying materials for construction and infrastructure in the region. It has also been a site of significant archaeological discovery, with excavations carried out on specific areas of the site since 2008. A range of prehistoric features have been discovered including Neolithic pits used as earth ovens, hearths and post-holes. Pottery shards dating back to around 3,000 BC have also been found.
