= Robert Puleston (MP) =

16th-century Welsh politician

Robert Puleston (by 1526 – 15 August 1583) was a Welsh politician.

He was the eldest surviving son of Sir John Puleston of Caernarvon and Bersham, who was MP for Caernarvon and Caernarvonshire. He succeeded his father in 1551.

He was a justice of the peace for Denbighshire in 1555–61, Justice of the Peace of the Quorum from 1562 until his death, and appointed High Sheriff of Denbighshire for 1558 – 59 and 1569–70. He was also High Sheriff of Montgomeryshire for 1571-72 and from 1573 to his death a J.P. for Caernarvonshire.

He was elected a member (MP) of the Parliament of England for Caernarvon Boroughs in 1547 and for Denbighshire in March 1553 and 1571.

He married Ellen, the daughter of William Williams of Cochwillan, Caernarvonshire; they had 6 sons and 2 daughters.
