= Foxhall Newydd =

Country house in Denbighshire, Wales

Coordinates: 53°11′45″N 3°27′13″W

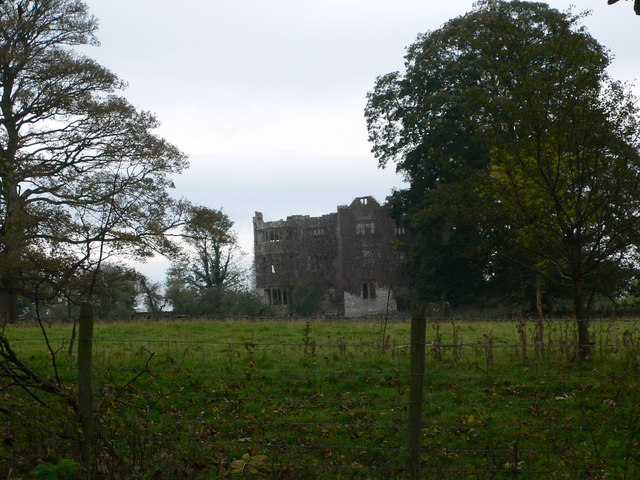
Foxhall Newydd

Foxhall Newydd is a Grade I listed country house, roughly 1 kilometre (0.62 mi) to the southeast of Henllan, Denbighshire, north Wales. The house, planned in a symmetrical H-plan, commenced construction under John Panton of Denbigh in 1592. Though it was never finished and has now been in ruins for over 150 years, it is described by Cadw as "one of the most ambitious and sophisticated projects of Elizabethan house building in Wales". It became a Grade I listed building on 24 October 1950.
