= Glan-y-wern =

Village in Ceredigion, Wales

Coordinates: 52.47895°N 4.042243°W

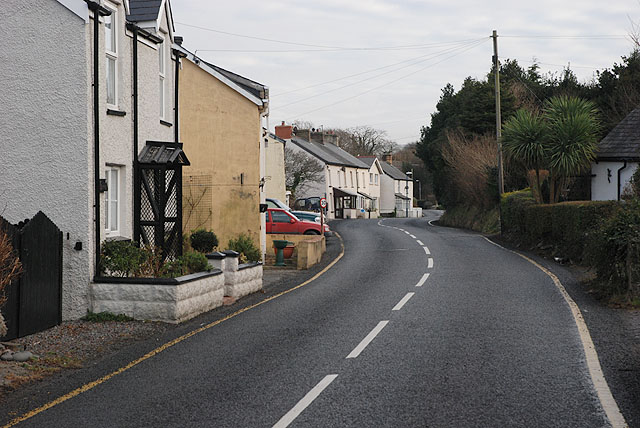

- Location within Ceredigion
- OS grid reference: SN 6140 8874
  - Cardiff: 78.2 mi (125.9 km)
  - London: 179.6 mi (289.0 km)
- Community: Borth
- Principal area: Ceredigion
- Country: Wales
- Sovereign state: United Kingdom
- Post town: Borth
- Postcode district: SY24
- Police: Dyfed-Powys
- Fire: Mid and West Wales
- Ambulance: Welsh
- UK Parliament: Ceredigion Preseli
- Senedd Cymru – Welsh Parliament: Ceredigion

Glan-y-wern is a hamlet in the community of Borth, Ceredigion, Wales, which is 78.2 miles (125.9 km) from Cardiff and 179.6 miles (289 km) from London. Glan-y-wern is represented in the Senedd by Elin Jones (Plaid Cymru) and is part of the Ceredigion Preseli constituency in the House of Commons.

== See also ==
- List of localities in Wales by population
