= Coed Coch =

19th century mansion in Denbighshire, Wales

Coordinates: 53.2509°N 3.6781°W

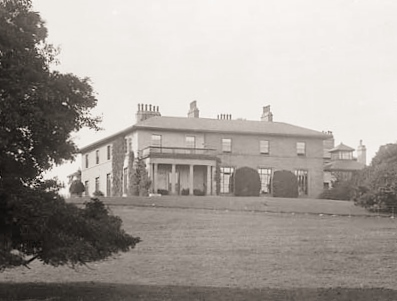
Coed Coch in c. 1885 (from a photograph by John Thomas in the National Library of Wales)

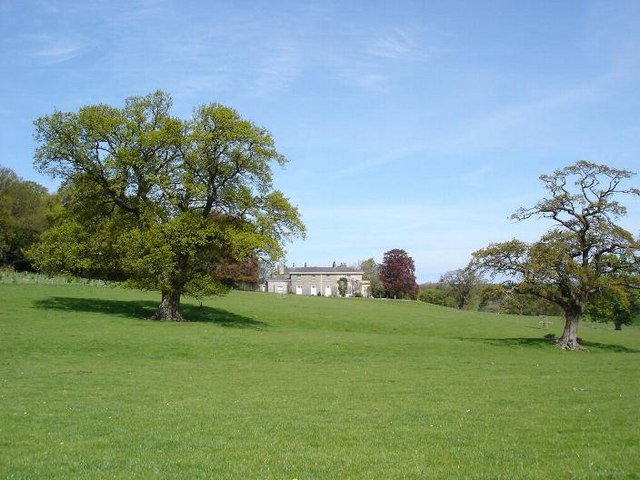
The grounds of Coed Coch in 2006

Coed Coch, in Dolwen, Conwy, Wales, is a large early 19th-century mansion in the neoclassical style, designed by the architect Henry Hakewill. The building is Grade II* listed, as is its 18th- and 19th-century parkland. It was built on the site of an earlier building.

The mansion is of ashlar, originally with two matching, three-bay elevations. At a diagonal, was a "remarkable" Greek Doric portico, with pediment. This was removed in the early 20th century. The main elliptical staircase remains within a rotunda and lit by a small lantern dome. Initially, there were extensive outbuildings, a walled garden, pleasure grounds, conservatory and an artificial lake. The original landscaped parkland "survives in its entirety", including the surrounding extensive conifer plantations, native oak woods and open ground.

The Coed Coch estate came to the Wynne family when the Rev. Richard Wynne married Gaynor, daughter and heiress of John Wynne of Coed Coch, in the parish of Betws yn Rhos. Their grandson, John Lloyd Wynne (1776–1887) undertook the enlargement of the house and estate in the early 19th century. The estate then descended in the male line until the death in World War I of Edward Henry John Wynne (1893–1916). The estate was inherited by Margaret Broderick, his half-sister, who ran a famous Welsh Mountain Pony stud there that continued under her descendants until its sale in 1978.

From the 1940s until the 1970s, the house was a boys' preparatory school, Heronwater School, under the headmastership of Keith Gaskell. In 1996 the furniture from the library, commissioned by John Lloyd Wynne from Gillows of Lancaster in 1806–1807, was bought by the Museum of Welsh Life in Cardiff; it can now be seen in the library of St Fagans Castle.
