= Henllan =

Village in Denbighshire, Wales

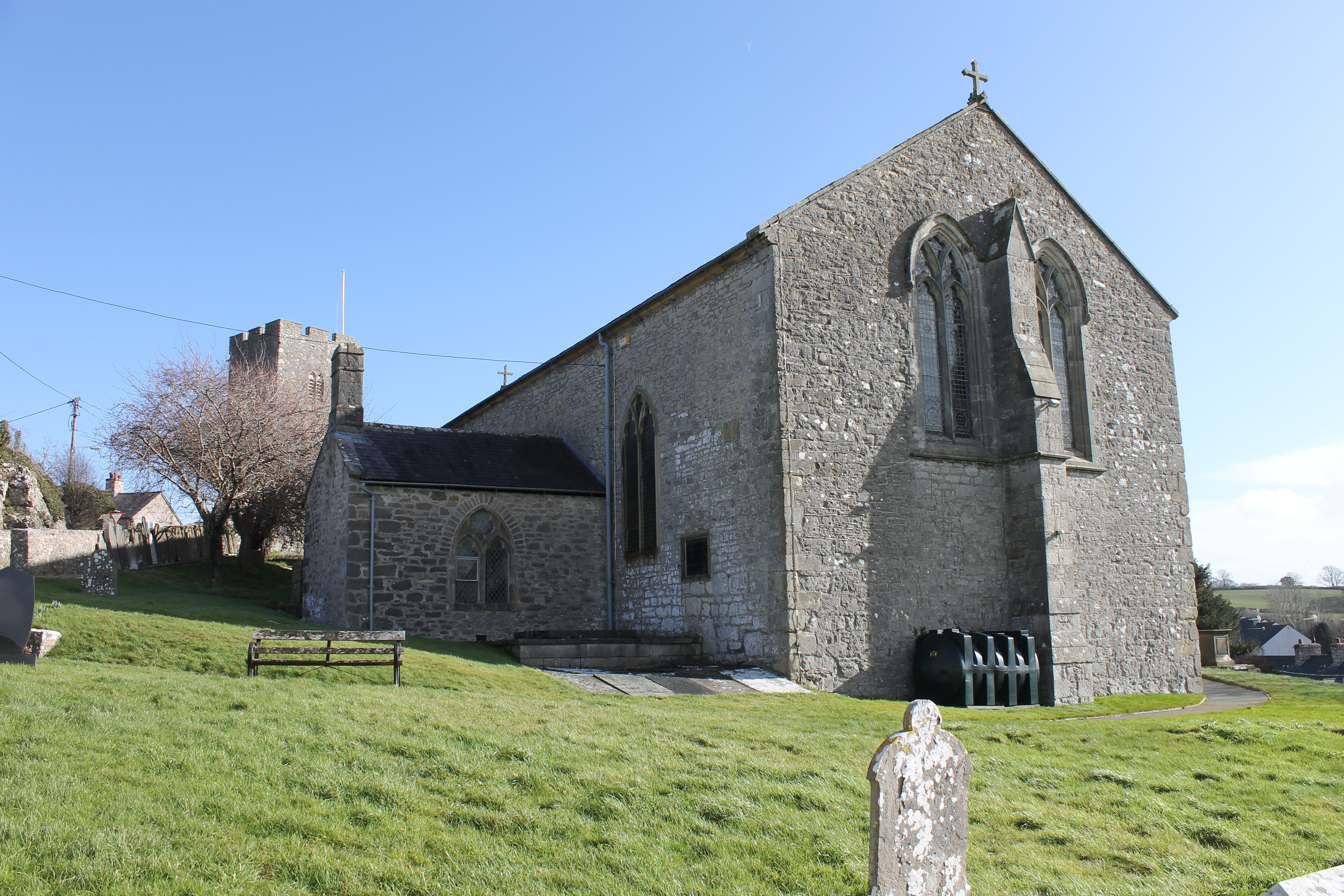
- Church with tower behind

- Location within Denbighshire
- Population: 830 (2022)
- OS grid reference: SJ022681
- Community: Henllan
- Principal area: Denbighshire
- Country: Wales
- Sovereign state: United Kingdom
- Post town: DENBIGH
- Postcode district: LL16
- Dialling code: 01745
- Police: North Wales
- Fire: North Wales
- Ambulance: Welsh
- UK Parliament: Clwyd North
- Senedd Cymru – Welsh Parliament: Vale of Clwyd
- List of places UK Wales Denbighshire 53.201°N 3.463°W Map of the community

Henllan is a village and community in Denbighshire, Wales, approximately 2.25 miles (3.5 km) north-west of Denbigh. The name is derived from Old Welsh, Hên-llan, meaning "old church-enclosure", "old churchyard" or "old parish". The population had increased to 862 at the 2011 census, before declining again to 830 at the 2022 census.

The Grade I listed country house, Foxhall Newydd, lies to the southeast. The country house retreat, Eriviat Hall, also lies outside the village. The Llindir Inn, reputed to be haunted, dates to the 13th century.

== Church and bell tower ==
The tower of Saint Sadwrn's church is unusual in that it was built separate from the main building housing the congregation. The stone tower, which is built on a rising rock, is sited at the highest point in the churchyard. It is thought this was to increase the range over which the tolling bells could be heard by parishioners. The traditional parish of Henllan covered a large area; today it forms part of the Benefice of Henllan, which includes the parishes of Henllan, Bylchau and Gwytherin.

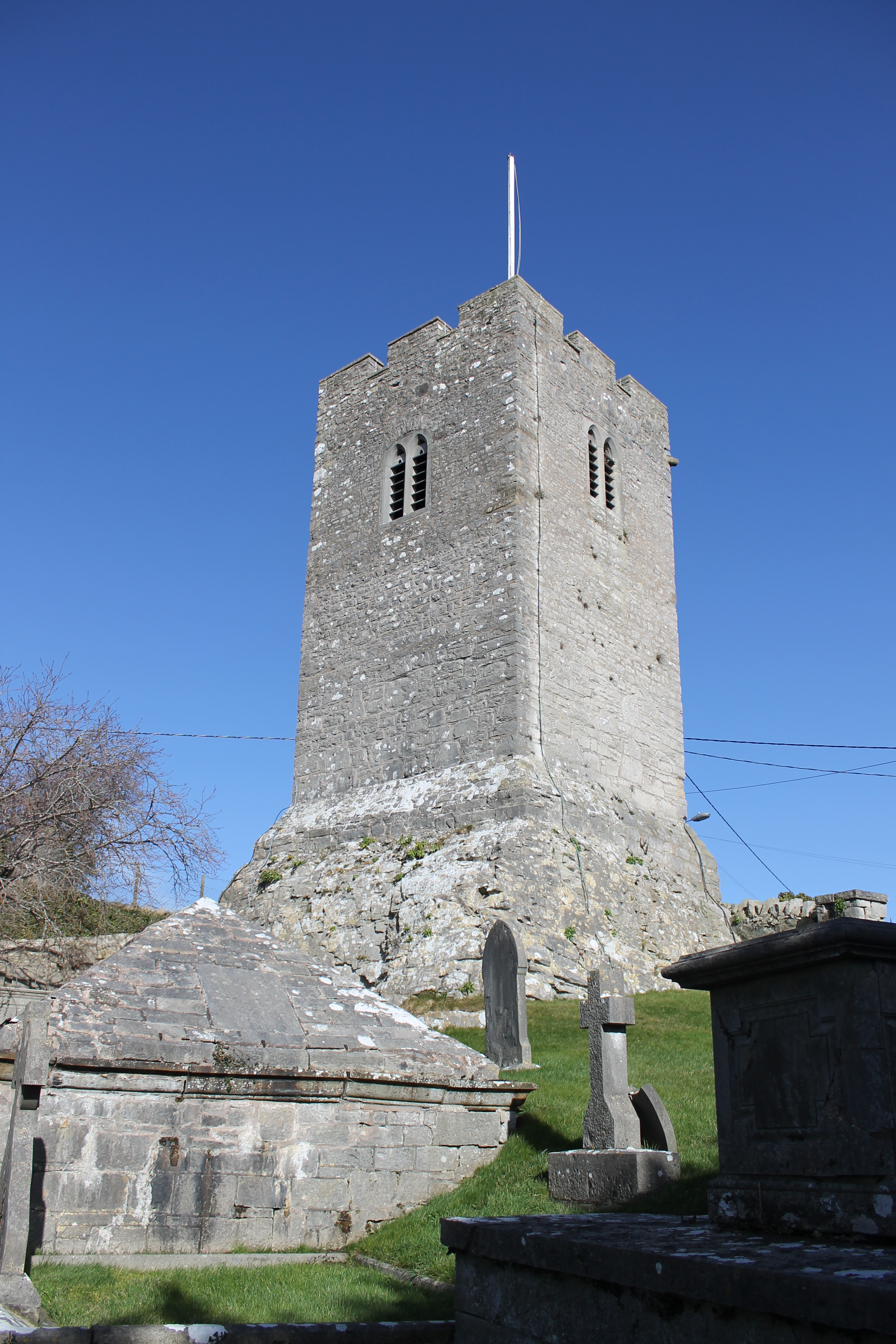
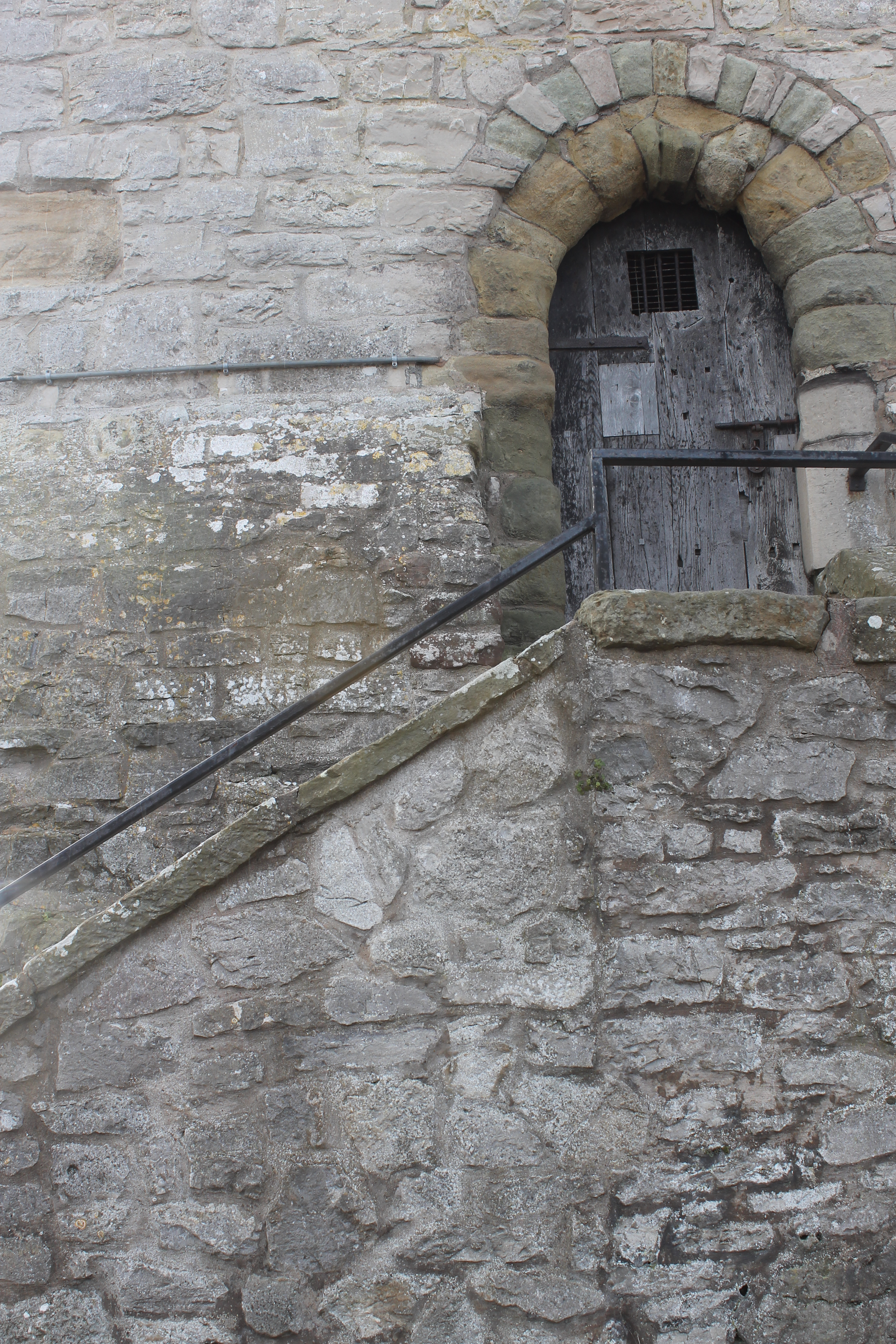

== Education ==
Ysgol Gymraeg Henllan provides Welsh-medium primary education to the village. As of 2024, there were 70 pupils enrolled at the school. 39.1 per cent of statutory school age pupils spoke Welsh at home.
