= Trevalyn Hall =

Manor house near Wrexham, Wales

Coordinates: 53.1046°N 2.9499°W

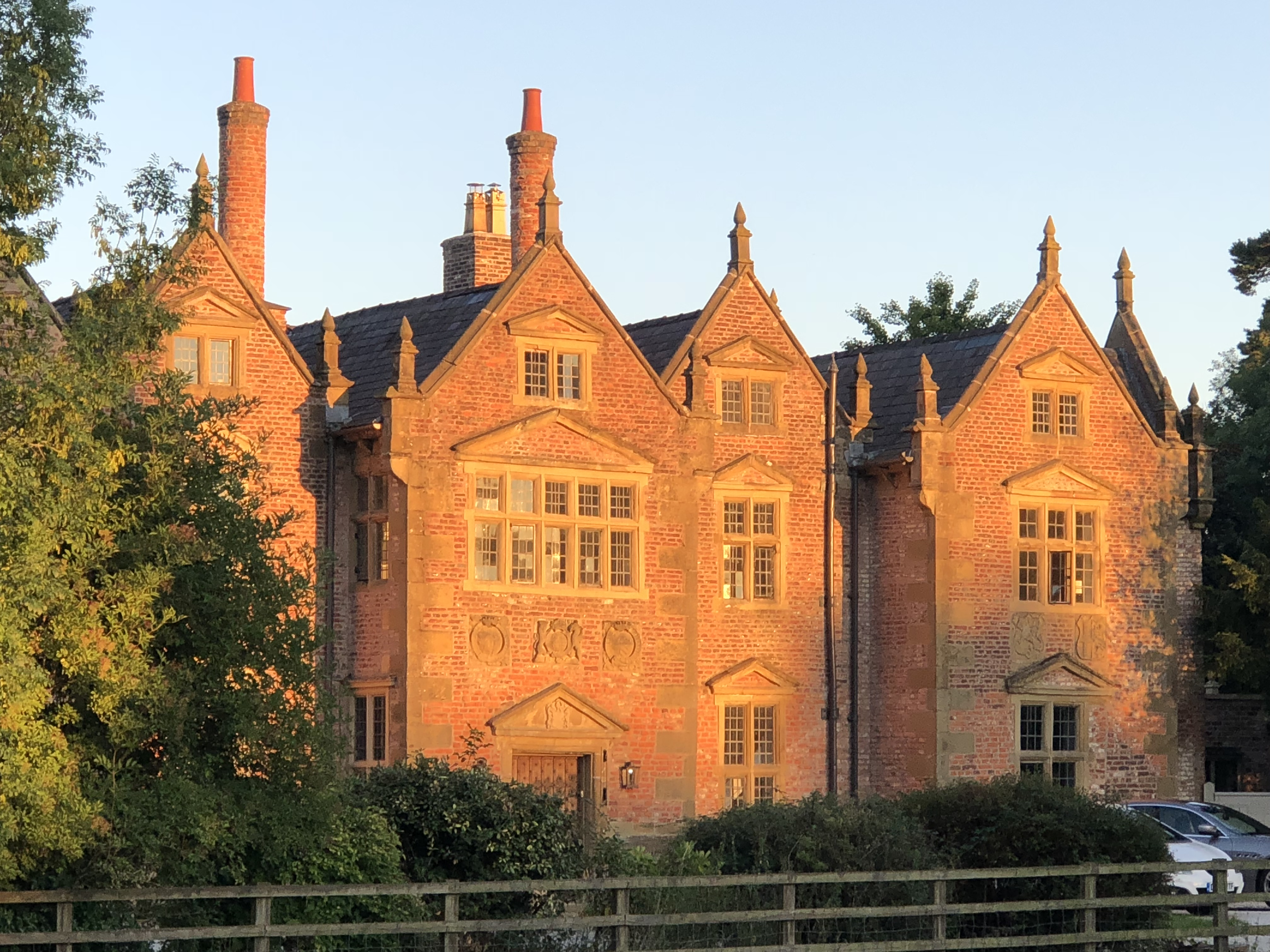
Trevalyn Hall

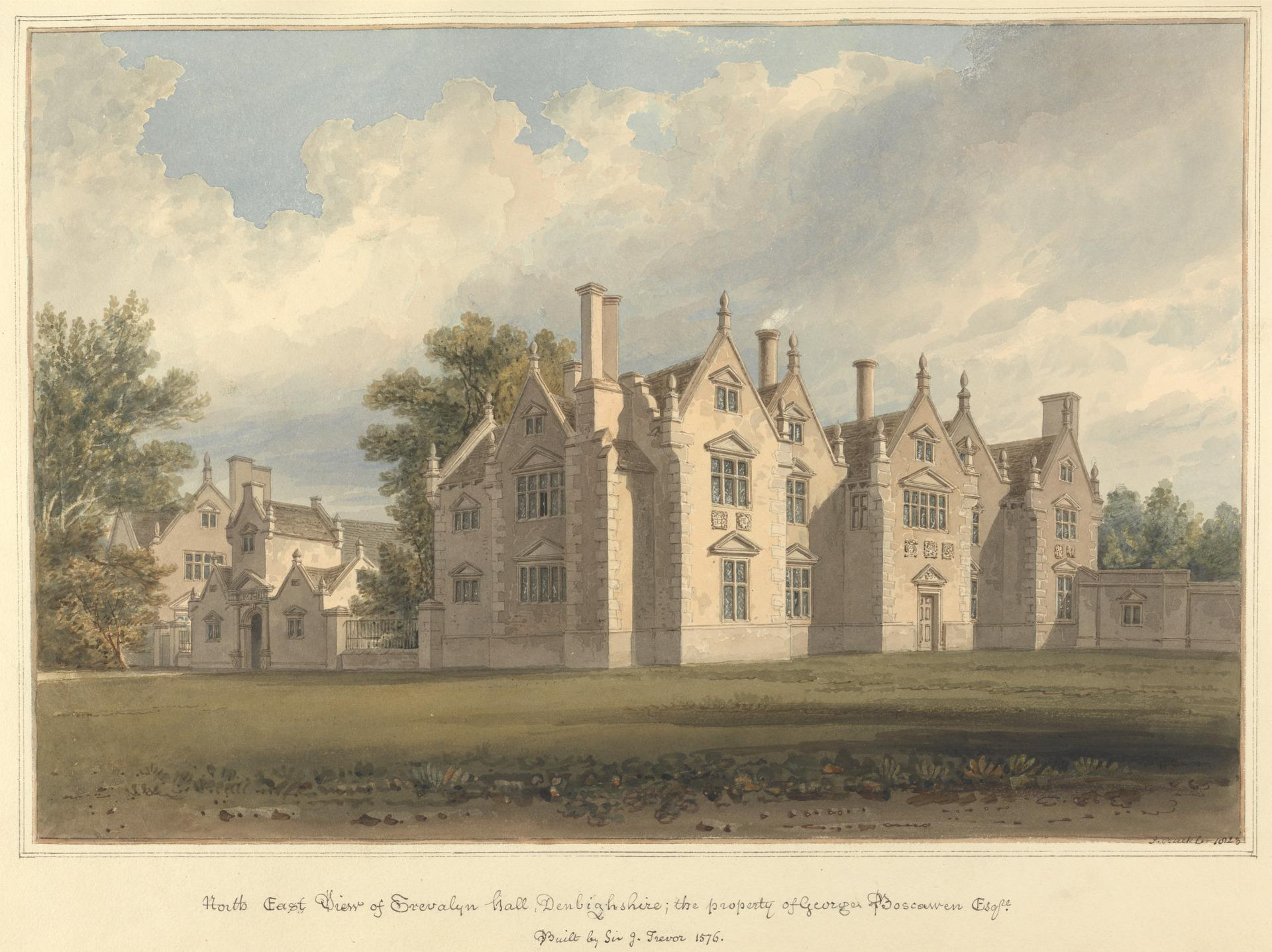
North East View of the Hall by artist George Stubbs

Trevalyn Hall in Rossett, a Grade II* listed building, is an Elizabethan manor house near Wrexham in Wales. It was built by John Trevor in 1576. The Trevor family of Trevalyn were one of the leading families in East Denbighshire by about 1600 with numerous estates in both Flintshire and Denbighshire. The Plas Teg estate in Hope, Flintshire was also acquired by the Denbighshire branch of the family when it was purchased from a cousin by Sir John Trevor I (1563–1630) and it was he who built the present Plas Teg house in 1610.

The Hall is constructed from brick with stone dressings on a stone plinth of five exposed courses. There are five bays with the end wings and central entrance bay projecting to the south-east on a H-plan. The three bays at the front elevation have decorative tulip-shaped finials at base and apex of the gables. Between the windows of the first and second storeys there are armorial bearings carved in stone including those of the Sackville Family

There is some evidence to suggest that the service wing and corridor linking it to the main house were rendered with pebbledash in the early 1800s to mirror the new estate cottages of Gresford and Rossett. In later years the render was removed. The interior was remodelled in the 1830s by architect Thomas Jones for the Grifith family. Trevalyn Hall was Grade II* listed on 9 June 1952 due to it being an important example of an Elizabethan country house, and for historic associations with the Trevor family who developed much of the surrounding built environment.

County Winner: Best Extension or Alteration to an Existing Home

In 1984 the Hall was divided into two residences, retaining many original features including the fireplaces by Jones. In recent years the Hall has undergone more sympathetic restoration and redecoration by the current owner, Alexander Daghlian, who received an Excellence Award from LABC for the Best Extension in 2018. The extension of the building created an orangery for the property that was designed to reflect the original building using reclaimed brick, incorporating sandstone dressings and bronze casement windows. Some of the work undertaken during 1980s used materials and techniques unsuitable for use in a historic building. These materials have been stripped out and the building refurbished and upgraded using traditional and breathable materials. In particular the roof has been insulated with sheep’s wool, walls re-plastered in hemp plaster and redecorated in clay paints, windows overhauled, and a limecrete floor with underfloor heating installed. During the works a 16th-century fireplace was also uncovered and restored.

== The garden ==
The garden encompasses several tiers of historic development. Although there are no deer at Trevalyn, the deer parks remain, now as arable farmland. These are probably contemporary with the original house. Big Park and Pine Tree Park lie to the south-west of Trevalyn Hall and borders the village of Marford which was built in about 1813–14 by the Trevalyn Estate.

To the north-east of Pine Tree Park is Walnut Park. The orchard, now a field, lies to the north-west and south-west of the gardens. This still has an earthen bank to keep the deer out. The kitchen garden is now only part walled on the north-west and north-east sides, but is thought to have originally been completely walled.

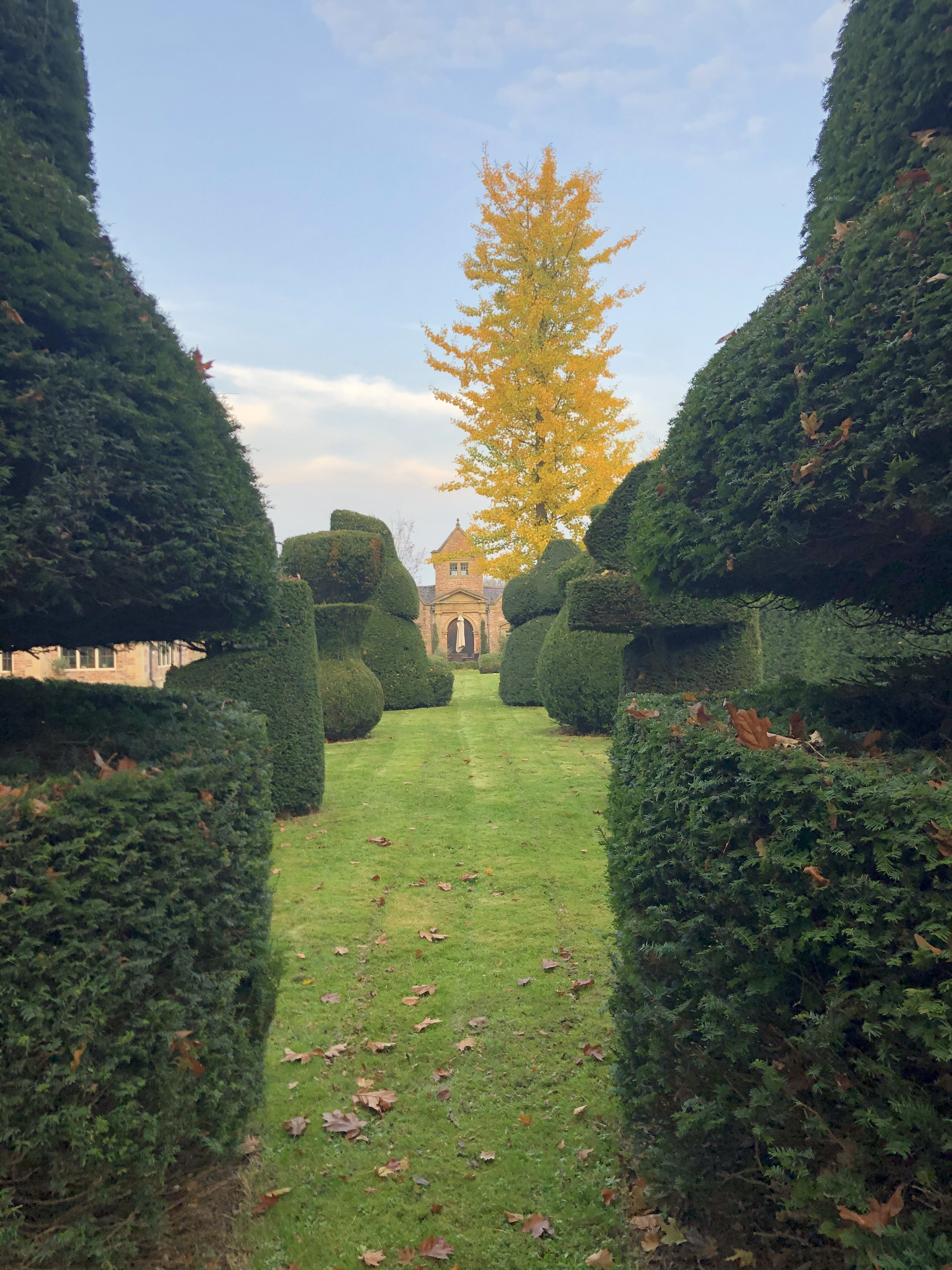
Topiary at the Hall

During the interior remodelling in the 1830s the topiary garden to the north east was created.

The Trevor family of Trevalyn were one of the leading families in East Denbighshire by about 1600 with numerous estates in both Flintshire and Denbighshire. The Plas Teg estate in Hope, Flintshire, was also acquired by the family when it was purchased by Sir John Trevor I (1563–1630) and it was he who built the present Plas Teg house in 1610.

The garden is listed as Grade II in the Cadw/ICOMOS Register of Parks and Gardens of Special Historic Interest in Wales.
