= Alfred Neobard Palmer =

British historian

- Born: 10 July 1847; Thetford, Norfolk, United Kingdom
- Died: 7 March 1915 (aged 67); Wrexham, Denbighshire, United Kingdom
- Occupations: Analytical Chemist, Historian
- Writing career
- Notable work: The History of Ancient Tenures of Land in the Marches of North Wales

Alfred Neobard Palmer (10 July 1847 – 7 March 1915) was a chemist and local historian. He published several books concerning the local history of Wrexham and north Wales.

== Biography ==
Alfred Neobard Palmer was born in Thetford, Norfolk, England, on 10 July 1847 to Alfred Palmer and Harriet Catherine (née Neobard). He had a younger brother and sister, John and Catherine. In June 1878, he married Esther (Ettie) Francis in Salford, Lancashire. They had no children.

He attended Thetford Grammar School from 1855 to 1860 and then a private academy from 1860 to 1862, where he discovered an interest in natural science.

Palmer became a teacher in Cambridgeshire for a short time, but in 1863 started work for a chemist in Bury St. Edmunds. In 1874, he became an analytical chemist with a company in Manchester, where he met and married Ettie. He later moved to Wrexham and in September 1880 he took up employment with the Zoedone Mineral Water Company, where he worked until 1882. He also worked for the Brymbo Steelworks Company where he was appointed chief chemist, but had to leave after two years due to ill health. Some sources report that his time at Brymbo was from 1882 to 1884, others from 1884 to 1886.

After leaving Brymbo he set up in private practice as an analytical chemist in Chester Street, Wrexham, but later worked from 1891 to 1904 at the Cambrian Leather Works.

Palmer's first work on local history was The Town, Fields and Folk of Wrexham in the Time of James the First (1883), based on a 1620 survey of the Lordship of Bromfield and Yale by John Norden. He went on to write 10 books and many articles on local history and archaeology, of which The History of Ancient Tenures of Land in the Marches of North Wales, 1885, was regarded both by himself and other scholars as his best work.

His health and finances deteriorated with each book he wrote, the latter particularly after the publication of an unsuccessful novel, Owen Tanat (1897). However, his financial situation improved in 1892 and 1894 when he received two legacies and in 1905 when he was awarded a Civil List pension.

He died on 7 March 1915 in Wrexham and was buried at Wrexham Cemetery.

In commemoration of his work on the history of the area, Wrexham County Borough Council have named their local history centre after him: A.N. Palmer Centre for Local Studies and Archives and there is a plaque to him in the Centre. It was originally unveiled by Lord Howard de Walden at the old Wrexham Public Library on Queen's Square on 29 November 1922.

== Bibliography ==
Here are some of the main publications by AN Palmer.

- 1885 The History of Ancient Tenures of Land in the Marches of North Wales
- 1886 The History of the Parish Church of Wrexham
- 1888 The History of the Older Nonconformity of Wrexham
- 1893 The History of the Town of Wrexham
- 1903 The History of the Thirteen Country Townships of the Old Parish of Wrexham
- 1905 A History of the Old Parish of Gresford
- 1906-1910 The Town of Holt in County Denbigh
- 1910 The History of Ancient Tenures of Land in the Marches of North Wales (Expanded version with Edward Owen)
- ca. 1908-1909 The History of the Parish of Ruabon (not finished before his death), published in 1992 by Bridge Books of Wrexham
