= John Salusbury =

John Salusbury or Salesbury may refer to:

- John Salusbury (died 1540s), courtier and knight of the shire for Denbighshire
- John Salusbury (died 1578), knight of the shire for Denbighshire
- John Salesbury (1533–1580), member of parliament for Merioneth, Denbigh Boroughs, and Denbighshire
- Sir John Salusbury (poet) (1567–1612), Welsh poet and politician
- Sir John Salusbury, 4th Baronet (died 1684), English politician
- John Salusbury (MP) (died 1685), Welsh politician
- Sir John Salusbury (diarist) (1707–1762), Welsh diarist and explorer

== See also ==
- John Salisbury (disambiguation)
- Salusbury family
