= Brynbella =

Villa in Denbighshire, Wales

Coordinates: 53.2410°N 3.3771°W

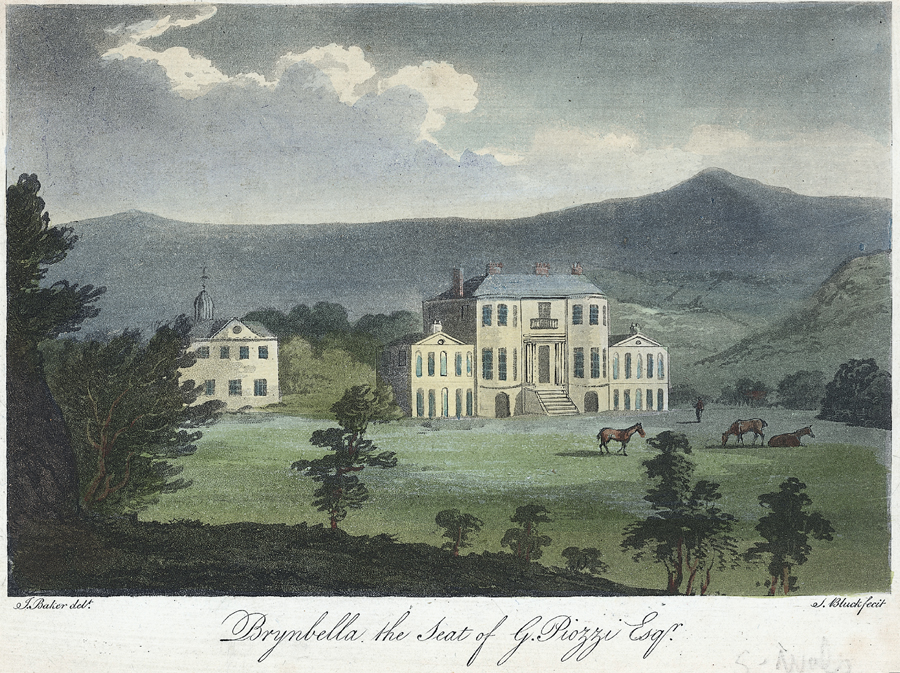
Brynbella

Brynbella is a neoclassical villa built near the village of Tremeirchion in Denbighshire, northeast Wales, by Hester Piozzi and her husband, Gabriel Piozzi. It was the seat of the Salusbury family from 1794 until 1920. The name is part Welsh and part Italian, meaning "Beautiful Hill" (bryn + bella).

== Early history ==
In 1794, Hester Piozzi began the construction of Brynbella with her husband in order to provide the family with a new seat after the destruction of Lleweni Hall, which had reverted to the ownership of Stapleton Cotton, 1st Viscount Combermere due to primogeniture. It was built out of Portland limestone in the style of the Palladian villas which she had seen during her self-imposed exile in Italy. There, Gabriel Piozzi became accustomed to British society, although his position as a Catholic continually undermined his position amongst the local gentry.

The building was designed by Clement Mead who exhibited the design at the Royal Academy in 1794. Construction took place between 1792 and 1795 at a cost of £20,000. Letters between Clement Mead and the Piozzi family about the construction of the hall can be found in the University of Manchester Library.

== Use by the Salusbury family ==
After her death in 1821, the house became the possession of her adopted son, Sir John Salusbury Piozzi Salusbury. Like his namesake, John Salusbury, Hester's son had little idea of estate management and continued to dabble in politics and the emerging banking industry then erupting in London. Piozzi Salusbury spent relatively little time on his estate and as a result, it languished. He later sold off much of the original furniture made by Ince and Mayhew and Thomas Chippendale in order to modernize the house in accordance with the then-popular Victorian style of furniture.

After Piozzi Salusbury's death in 1858, it became the property of Rev. Sir Augustus George Salusbury who was then participating in the settlement of New South Wales. The decision to rent Brynbella full-time was undertaken by Salusbury's son, who continued to live in Australia. After his death in 1918, it fell into the hands of Frederic Salusbury who sold the estate two years later due to the extensive repairs that were necessitated after half a century of neglect.

== Recent history ==
After its original sale in 1918, Brynbella was continuously sold to a number of different families. The hall was given Grade II* listed building status in 1951. In 1994, it was purchased as a private residence and remains so today.

== Today ==
Peter Neumark (and family) live at the historic Brynbella. He is a director of Brynbella Investments Limited (incorporated 2021) and other companies. Sources describing the property as of 2024–2026 continue to treat it as the Neumarks’ private home. The house itself is not generally open to the public; the gardens had limited seasonal openings in the past.

== See also ==
- Salusbury family
- Hester Piozzi
- John Salusbury Piozzi Salusbury
