= Evan Lloyd (MP) =

16th-century Welsh politician

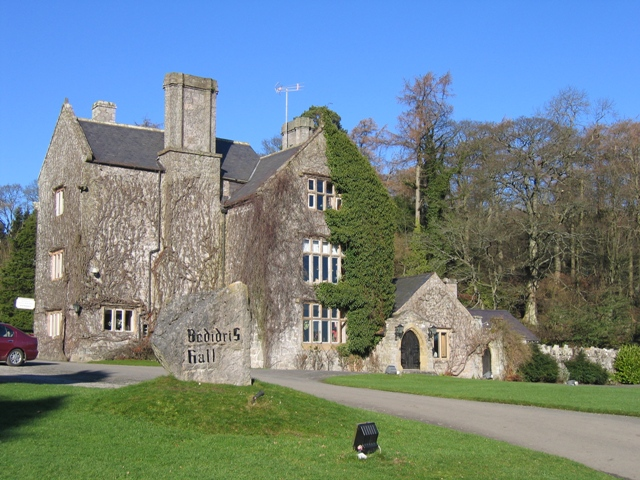
Remains of Bodidris House

Sir Evan Lloyd (died 1586), of Bodidris, Llanarmon yn Iâl, Denbighshire, was a Welsh politician, Member of Parliament. He was High Sheriff of Denbighshire and took part in the Earl of Leicester's expedition.

== Life ==
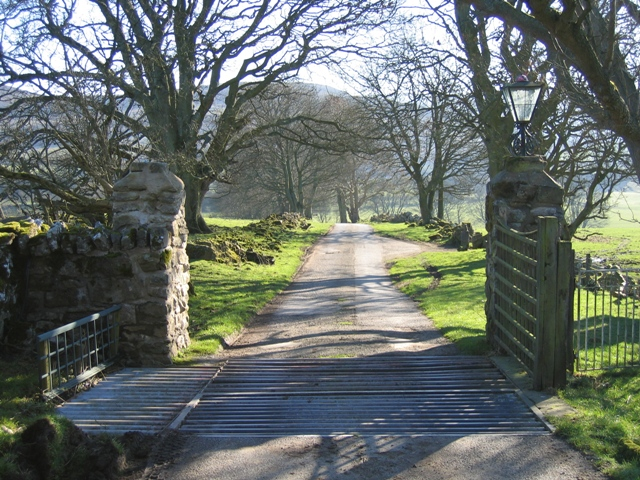
Entrance Gateway

He was the eldest son of John Lloyd. He was a justice of the peace for Denbighshire from 1575, for Flintshire from 1579 and for Merioneth from 1583. He was appointed High Sheriff of Denbighshire for 1582-83 and custos rotulorum of Denbighshire from 1575.

He was elected a member (MP) of the Parliament of England for Denbighshire in 1584. In 1586 Lloyd, a fervent Protestant, fought for the Dutch under Robert Sidney, 1st Earl of Leicester.

He died in London the following year on his way home, having been made a Knight banneret by the Earl. He was buried in his native parish on 3 March 1587.

== Family ==
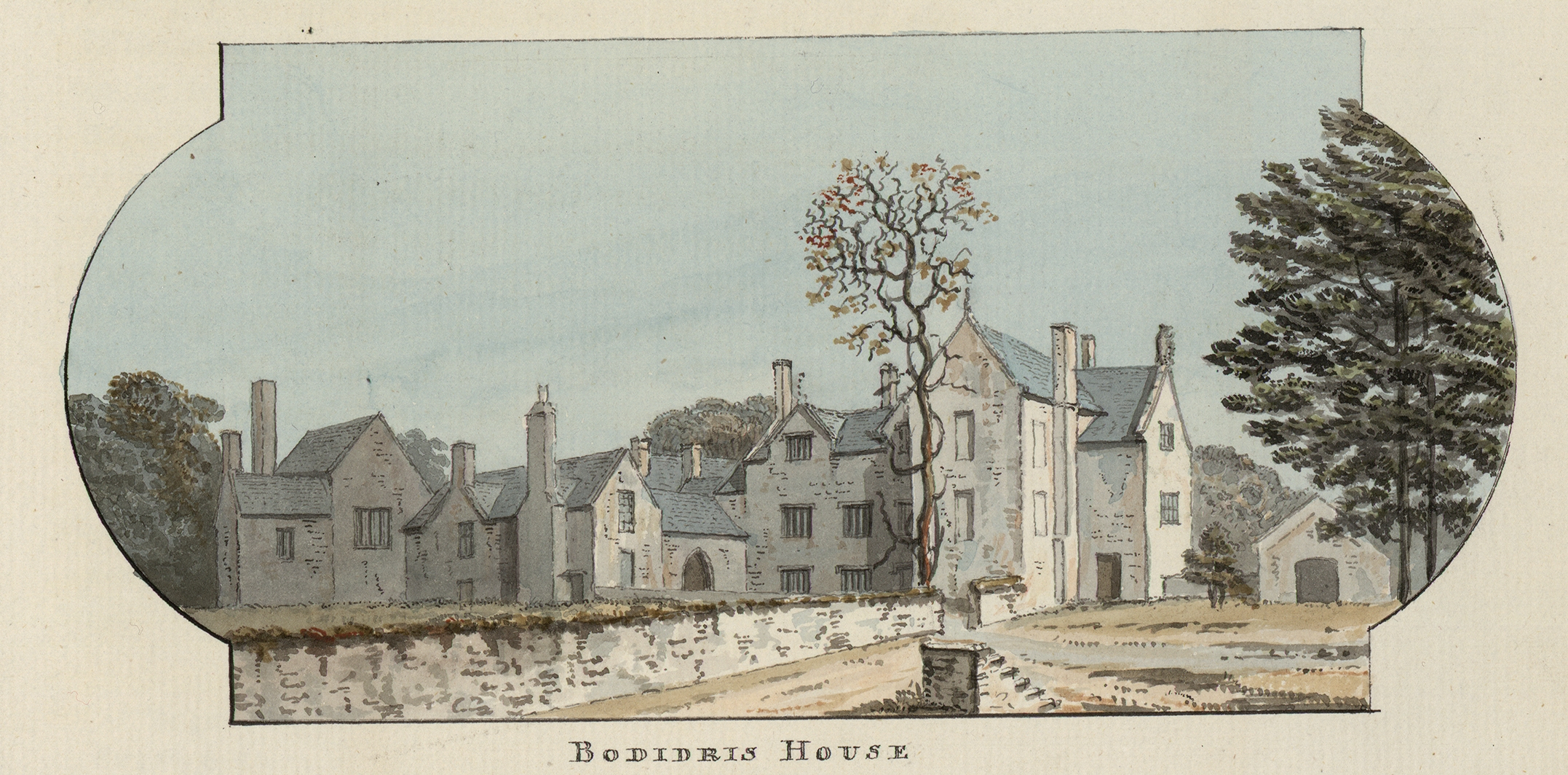
Bodidris house, home of Evan Lloyd

He had married Elizabeth, the daughter of Thomas Mostyn of Mostyn, Flintshire and the widow of John Wyn Iâl of Plas yn Iâl, brother of Chancellor Thomas Yale and member of the Yale family. Her grandfather was Sir William Griffith of Penrhyn Castle. Griffith was a blood relation of Charles Brandon, 1st Duke of Suffolk, who later married Queen Mary Tudor.

They had a daughter and a son, Sir John Lloyd, knight of bodidris, who became member of Parliament and married the daughter of John Salesbury (MP), member of the Salusbury family of Lleweni Hall.

He was one of a group of east Denbighshire squires who favored the cause of Robert Devereux, 2nd Earl of Essex against the Salusbury family of Llewenni, and was charged by the Star Chamber at the Palace of Westminster.

He raised forces with his brother-in-law, Captain John Salusbury of Rûg, for the Cádiz expedition of the Earl of Essex, and joined him in Ireland.

He was involved during a war with Sir Richard Trevor of Trevalyn Hall, who later became Vice-Admiral of North Wales. He backed with force the candidature of Sir Richard Trevor Trevor against Sir John Salusbury of Lleweni Hall.
