= John Salusbury Piozzi Salusbury =

British Army officer

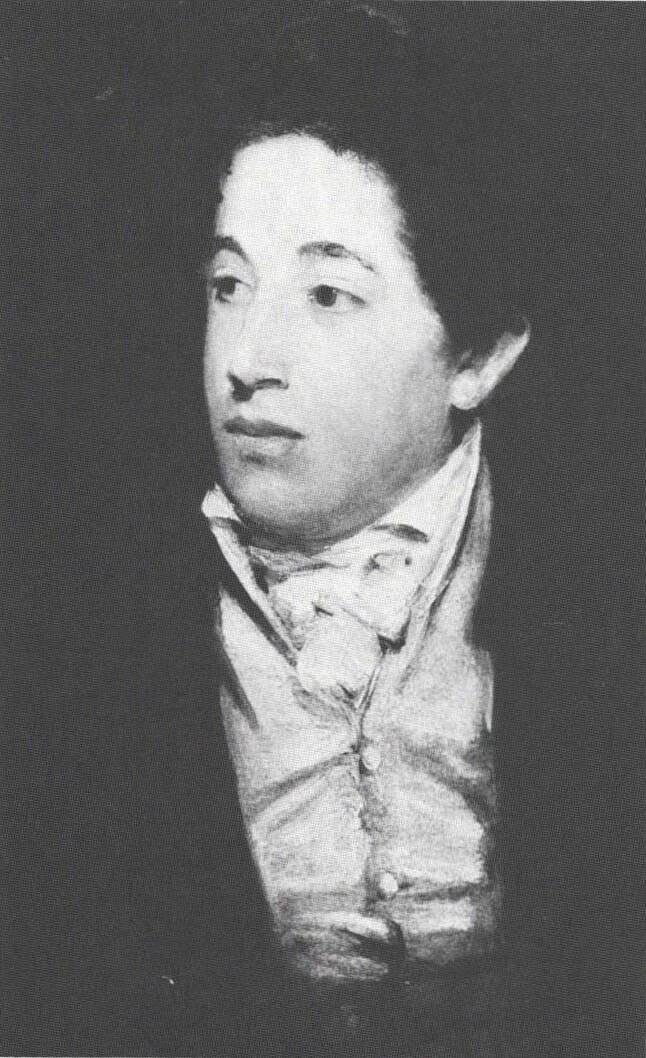
- Born: Brescia
- Died: 18 December 1858

Sir John Salusbury Piozzi Salusbury (9 September 1793 – 18 December 1858) was a British civil servant and, briefly, a military officer during the Battle of Waterloo. He was named after his adopted grandfather, Sir John Salusbury.

== Early life ==
John Salusbury Piozzi Salusbury was born to Giovanni Battista Piozzi in Milan, Italy. His father was a member of the Italian nobility who held significant tracts of land outside Milan. During the Napoleonic Wars, the family had been driven from their home by Napoleon's invasion of Milanese territory, which deprived them of an income. Giovanni named his eldest son "John Salusbury Piozzi" after the father of the wealthy and influential Hester Piozzi, the wife of Giovanni Battista Piozzi's brother Gabriel Piozzi, in the hope that Hester would provide the family with assistance. After she failed to do so, Giovanni Battista Piozzi gave John up for adoption. The boy became known, informally at this stage, as John Salusbury Piozzi Salusbury.

By all accounts, Salusbury was not happy to leave home, and upon seeing sheep heads at market, the child retold how he saw a basket of human heads in Brescia, then a part of Kingdom of Lombardy–Venetia. His adopted mother eventually wrote a pamphlet regarding the alleged barbarity of Napoleon's army after her son's story.

== Education and career ==
He was educated at Trinity College, Oxford. On 29 November 1813, Hester legally applied for him to bear the surname Salusbury. On 7 November 1814, he married Harriet Maria Pemberton of Ryton Grove, Shropshire, receiving Brynbella, along with the rest of Mrs Piozzi's estates in Flint, Denbigh and Caernarvonshire and becoming one of the foremost landowners in Wales. However, he had no concept of estate management and soon ran the properties into the ground.

During the Battle of Waterloo, Salusbury expected to be directly under the command of his uncle, Stapleton Cotton, 1st Viscount Combermere, but was instead an attaché to Henry William Paget, 1st Marquess of Anglesey whom he disliked for having "stolen" his uncle's command.

== Later life ==
In later life, Hester's pocket books indicate that he continually demanded money from her and was not very affectionate. He and his wife Harriet are known to have had eleven children including Rev. George Augustus Salusbury.

Salusbury went on to later become the High Sheriff of Flintshire in 1816. One year later, he was made a Knight Bachelor by William IV. His mother attempted to secure a baronetcy for him during that same year from the Viscount Sidmouth, but he spent the money on his extensive gambling debts. He died on 18 December 1858 in Cheltenham.

As Hester Piozzi was the last living member of the Salusbury family, she secured the rights and privileges of her father for her son. He is the progenitor of the modern Salusbury family, and all people who possess the right to bear the Salusbury arms are descended from him. Salusbury had several cousins, many of whom passed on their name without the rights and privileges restored to him via the crown.
