= John Salesbury =

16th-century Welsh politician

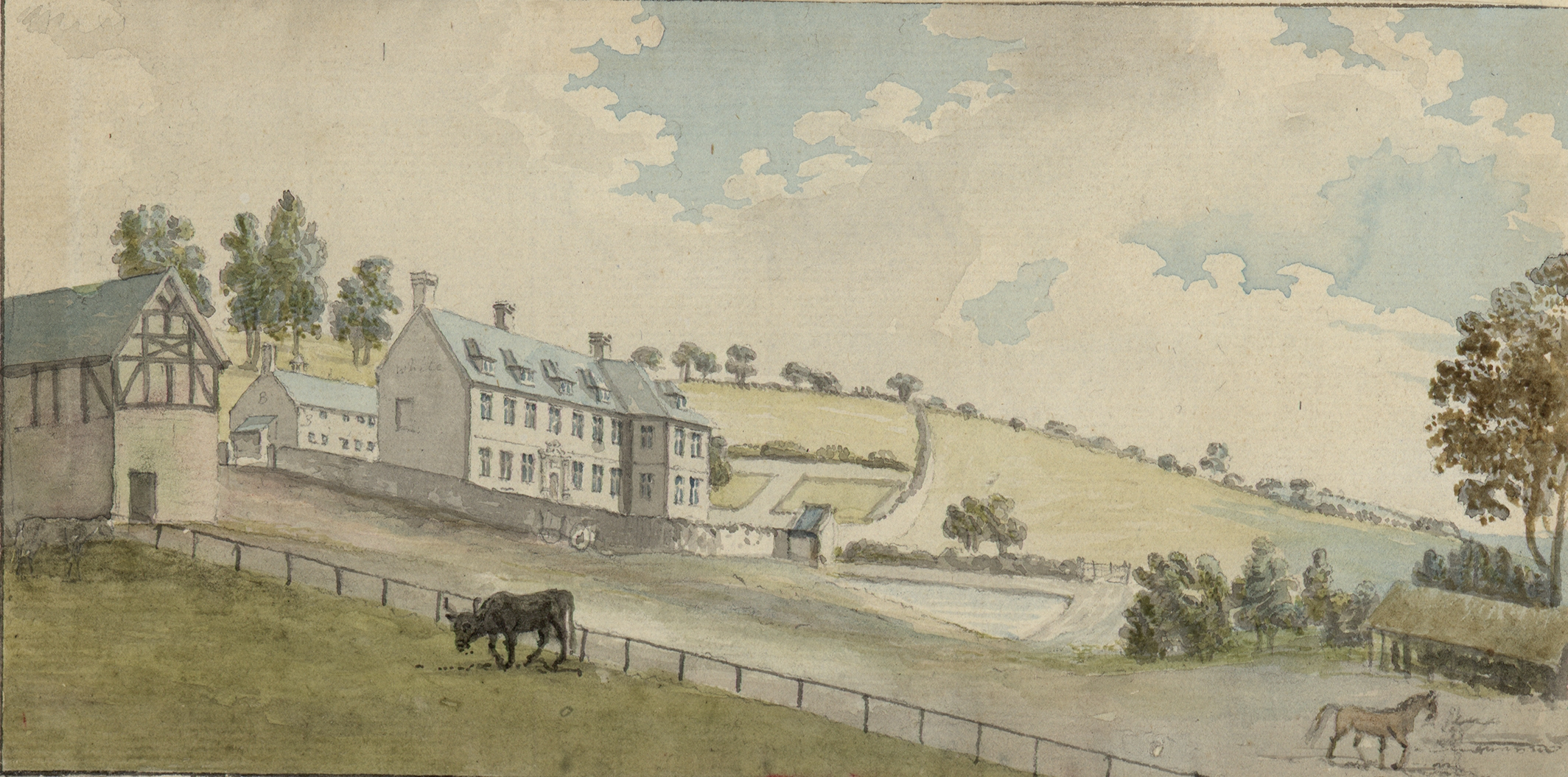
Bachymbyd

John Salesbury (1533–1580), of Rûg, near Corwen, Merionethshire and Bachymbyd, near Ruthin, Denbighshire, was a Welsh politician.

He was a member of the Anglo-Welsh Salusbury family, being from the branch of John Salusbury (d. 1540), son of Sir Thomas Salusbury of Lleweni Hall.

His ancestor John (d. 1540) was governor of Conway Castle and Denbigh Castle, as well as Chancellor and Chamberlain of Denbighshire.

John married Elizabeth, daughter of Sir John Salusbury II (MP), of Lleweni Hall.

Her cousin, Sir Thomas Salusbury, was involved in the Babington Plot, conspiring with Mary, Queen of Scots against Elizabeth Tudor.

John was a Member (MP) of the Parliament of England for Denbigh Boroughs in April 1554 and 1558, for Denbighshire in 1559 and Merioneth in October 1553.

His son Robert Salesbury (MP) was heir of the estate in Bachymbyd, Llanynys, and became a Member of Parliament.

His daughter Margaret married Sir John Lloyd, Knight of Bodidris, son of Sir Evan Lloyd (MP).
