= Robert Chester (poet) =

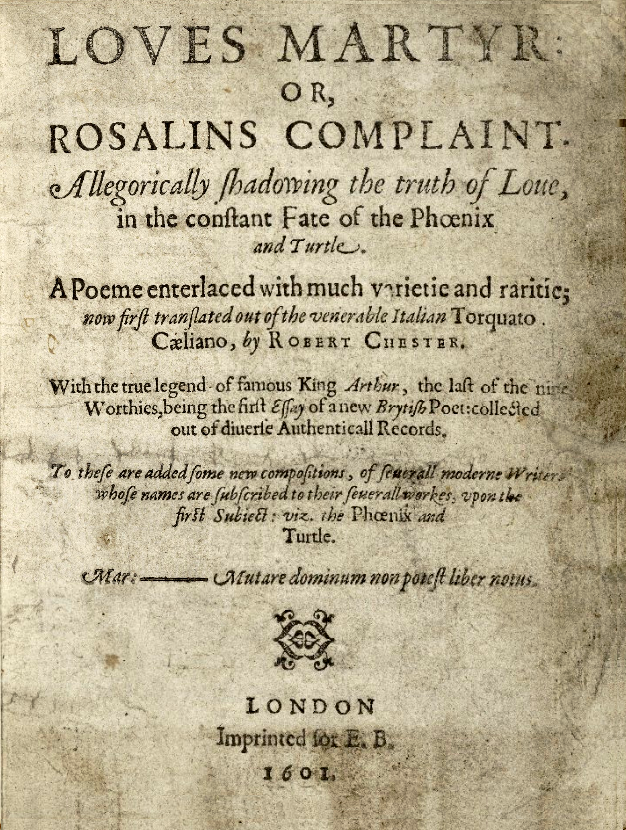
Title page of Loves Martyr (1601), printed by Richard Field

Robert Chester (flourished 1601) is the mysterious author of the poem Love's Martyr which was published in 1601 as the main poem in a collection which also included much shorter poems by William Shakespeare, Ben Jonson, George Chapman and John Marston, along with the anonymous "Vatum Chorus" and "Ignoto".

Despite attempts to identify Chester no information has ever emerged to indicate with any certainty who he was. Currently all that is known of Chester is his name, the long poem he published, and a few unpublished verses. The poem's meaning is deeply obscure. Even the authenticity of the date on the title page has been questioned. It is also not known why Shakespeare and so many other distinguished poets supplemented the publication of such an obscure person with their own works.

== Identity ==
The only clue to Chester's identity is the fact that his poem was dedicated to Sir John Salusbury of Lleweni Hall, Denbighshire, in Wales. Sir John was a member of the powerful Salusbury family of Wales. It may have been published to celebrate his knighthood in June 1601. However, even this date has been questioned.

In 1878 Chester was identified with a man of that name from Royston, Cambridgeshire, by Alexander Grosart, who produced the first modern edition of the poem. However, in 1913, Carleton Brown argued that Chester must have been closely associated with Salusbury in Denbighshire. Also, Chester's verse suggests that he was a servant of Salusbury's, rather than a social equal as was the Robert Chester from Royston. Brown discovered a manuscript poem entitled A Winter's Garland, written by Chester, in the Salisbury family archives. Another poem, welcoming Salusbury home from London, compares Chester's own crude "hoarse-throat raven's song" to the "court beautifying poets" he would have heard in London. Brown concluded that Chester was a local employee of Salusbury's who probably worked in his household. In 2009, Boris Borukhov, comparing the signatures of the poet and the Robert Chester from Royston, demonstrated that they were two different people. Chester's description of himself as a "British" poet, rather than "English" one, his particular interest in Geoffrey of Monmouth's account of King Arthur, as well as his links to Salusbury, strongly suggest that he was Welsh.

However, no documentation beyond this has been found to identify Chester. E. A. J. Honigmann argues that Chester was probably Salusbury's local chaplain or secretary, and that he and his patron shared a taste for "mystical verse" which contained obscure acrostic puzzles. Salusbury himself was a poet. A previous collection of verse, Sinetes Passions (1597) by Robert Parry had included a supplement containing acrostic verse, possibly written by Salusbury.

== The poem ==
=== Publication ===
The poem was first published in 1601 under the title Love's Martyr, or Rosalin's Complaint, in a quarto printed by Richard Field for the London bookseller Edward Blount. It was not entered in the Stationers' Register. The unused sheets of the first edition were subsequently acquired by the publisher Matthew Lownes, who reissued the work in 1611, unchanged but with a new title page: The Anuals of great Brittaine, or a most excellent Monument wherein may be seene all the antiquities of this Kingdome. Two copies of the first edition and one copy of the second are known to survive; a fourth copy, missing its title page, cannot be securely assigned to either issue.

=== Title ===
The title page of the first quarto of Love's Martyr explains the content:

Love's Martyr: or Rosalins Complaint. Allegorically shadowing the truth of Loue, in the constant Fate of the Phoenix and Turtle. A Poeme enterlaced with much varietie and raritie; now first translated out of the venerable Italian Torquato Caeliano, by Robert Chester. With the true legend of famous King Arthur the last of the nine Worthies, being the first Essay of a new Brytish Poet: collected out of diuerse Authenticall Records. To these are added some new compositions of seuerall moderne Writers whose names are subscribed to their seuerall workes, vpon the first subiect viz. the Phoenix and Turtle.

The Italian poet "Torquato Caeliano" is as mysterious as Robert Chester himself. No original Italian work from which the poem is supposed to have been translated has ever been identified, nor is Caeliano a known Italian poet. It has been argued that Chester made up Caeliano to conceal the personal significance of the poem's allegory. The name is probably a combination of the names of the real poets Torquato Tasso and Livio Celiano.

Another mystery is the alternative title "Rosalins Complaint", since there is no reference to anyone called "Rosalin" in the poem. The name may be derived from Edmund Spenser's The Shepherd's Calendar. Possibly this too had a private meaning that would have been understood by Chester and his circle.

=== Content ===
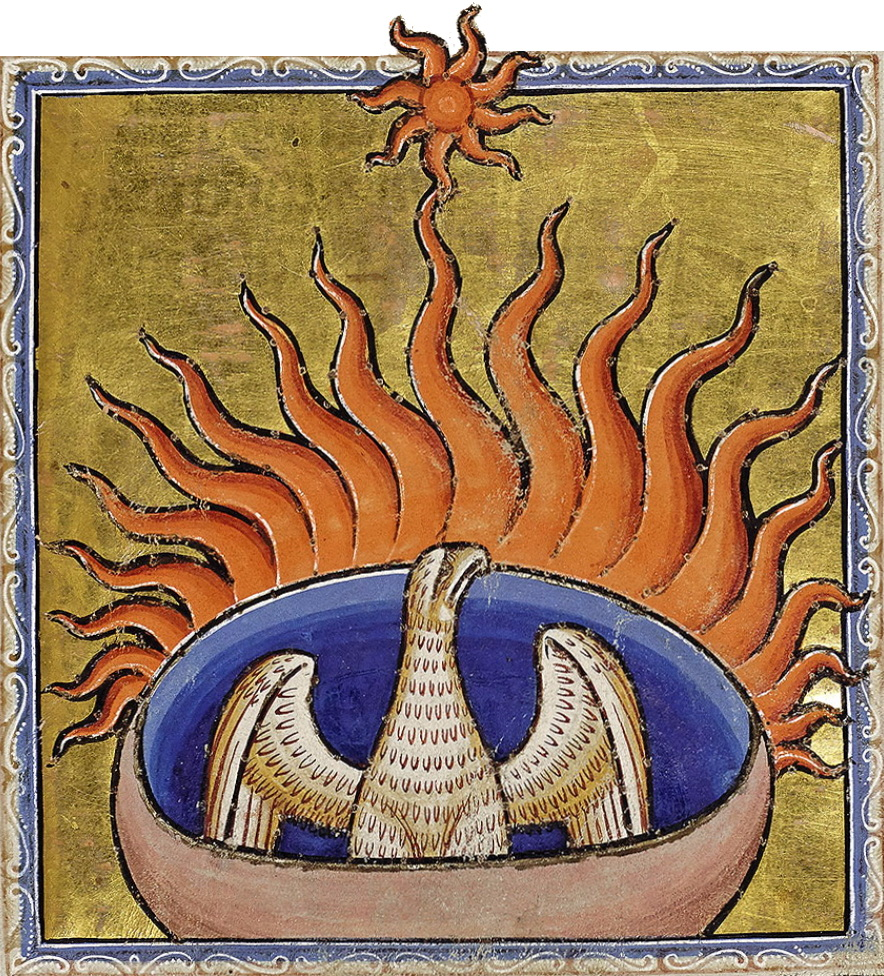
A dying-and-reborn phoenix, depicted in the Aberdeen Bestiary

Chester prefaced his poem with a short dedication addressed to the Phoenix and Turtledove, traditional emblems of perfection and devoted love, respectively:

Phoenix of beautie, beauteous, Bird of any
To thee I do entitle all my labour,
More precious in mine eye by far then many
That feedst all earthly sences with thy savour:
Accept my home-writ praises of thy loue,
And kind acceptance of thy Turtle-doue

The poem is a long allegory, incorporating the story of King Arthur, in which the relationship between the birds is explored, and its symbolism articulated.

It begins with the personification of Nature observing that the magnificently beautiful Phoenix is apparently about to die without an heir. The physical description given of the Phoenix is as a human female rather than a bird. Nature visits the Classical gods and pleads with Jupiter to find a way to give the Phoenix a child. Jupiter says that she must bring the Phoenix to the "isle of Paphos" to meet the Turtledove whose lover has apparently died. The Turtledove is guarding the fire of Prometheus. Jupiter gives Nature a magical "balm" to anoint the Tutledove, which will make him fall in love with the Phoenix. On the trip she tells the story of King Arthur, gives an account of ancient British kings and gives Brythonic (Welsh) etymologies for British towns. There follows a long description of the flora and fauna of Paphos, explaining the nature and uses of the various plants and animals.

At the island, the Phoenix and the Turtledove fall in love, apparently without the aid of the balm. But first the Turtledove asks the Phoenix to forgive him for some unspecified wrong. They then agree to die together in a self-sacrificing fire, building an altar to Apollo, the patron of poetry. As they are consumed, the Phoenix laments the death of the Turtledove. A watching pelican observes the Phoenix's own death and describes a new and even more beautiful Phoenix emerging in glory from the flames.

The narrative is followed by a series of acrostic love poems entitled "Cantos to the fair Phoenix made by Paphian Dove". Each line of the verses begins with each letter of the alphabet in sequence. These are supposed to have been written by the Turtledove to the Phoenix, implying a long and complex relationship. They are followed by other separate love poems idealising spiritual devotion to the Phoenix. It is not clear whether these poems are written by Chester, who signed his name to the end of the narrative section. William Empson stated that they displayed the "very recognisable facility and ingenuity" of Sir John Salusbury's poetry, published in Parry's 1597 book.

After these are the poems by Shakespeare and the others, which comment on the symbolism. In addition to the named poets, there are poems attributed to "Vatum Chorus" (chorus of poets) and "Ignoto" (anonymous). The poems are introduced by Vatum Chorus and Ignoto, followed by Shakespeare's The Phoenix and the Turtle, which states that the birds died "leaving no posterity" due to their "married chastity". John Marston then seems to reply to Shakespeare's "moving epicedium", by referring to the couple's "glorious issue": the new Phoenix born from the flames. Chapman adds more detail on the relationship, saying that the Phoenix provided every variety of life to the Turtle, "She was to him the Analysed World of pleasure, / Her firmness cloth'd him in variety". Jonson ends with an idealisation of the Phoenix, whose judgement shines as "Clear as a naked Vestal, / Closed in an orb of Crystal."

=== Interpretations ===
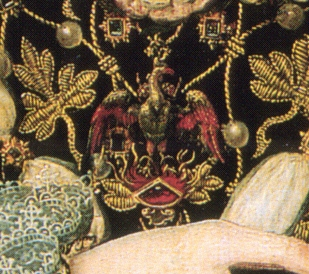
Elizabeth's Phoenix jewel from the Phoenix portrait by Nicholas Hilliard

There have been many attempts to interpret the symbolism of the poem, though the most common one is that the Phoenix represents Queen Elizabeth I, who used the Phoenix as her symbol. The "isle of Paphos" is thus her realm of England, the history of which is given in such detail. The Turtledove has been said to be the dedicatee of the poem, Sir John Salusbury. Critics Katherine Duncan-Jones and Henry Woudhuysen argue that the recent Essex Rebellion against the queen is referred to in several passages, and state that Salusbury stands for the loyalty of the people as a whole. The fact that Salusbury's cousin sided with the rebels may be linked to the contrition that the Turtledove has to show. The "glorious issue" would thus be the prosperity and stability of the kingdom, to be passed on to Elizabeth's heir, James VI of Scotland. However, the degree of intimacy between the lovers, albeit chaste, has been used to argue against this view, as has the fact that both the Phoenix and Turtle die, though Salusbury and the Queen were still very much alive in 1601.

Another view, first expressed by Carleton Brown, is that the poem celebrated the marriage of Salusbury and his wife Ursula Stanley, the illegitimate daughter of Henry Stanley, 4th Earl of Derby. Brown argued that it was written after the birth of their first child. This view has been criticised on the grounds that the poem emphasises the chastity of the couple, nor is it clear why Ursula and John would have to die to produce a child. Indeed they were both alive in 1601, having by then had nine more children since their first daughter.

Other commentators have suggested esoteric symbolism, or politically dangerous messages, hidden in deliberately obscure allegory, such as support for Catholic martyrs such as Anne Line, or for Essex himself.
