= John de Beauchesne =

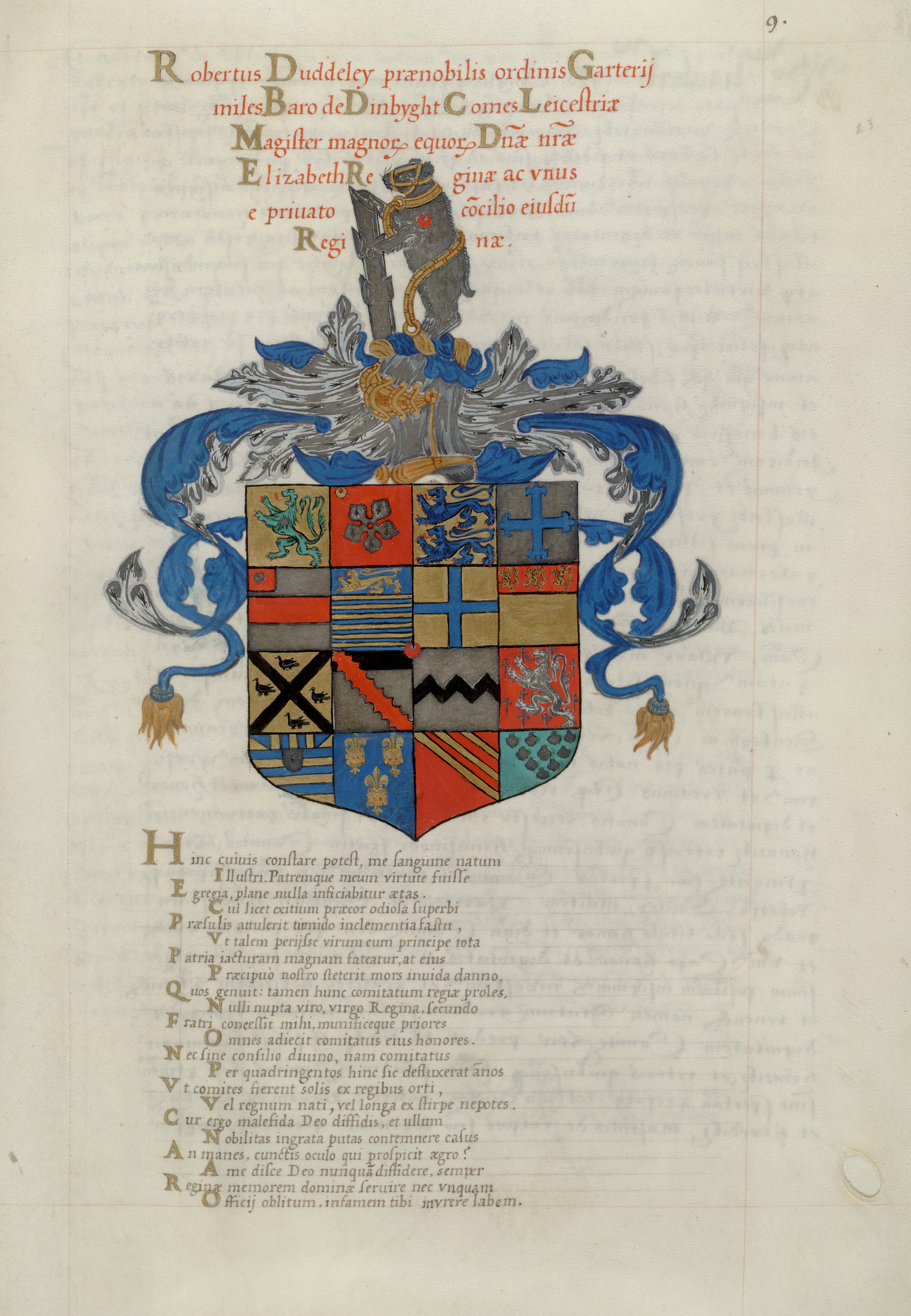
Arms of Robert Dudley, Earl of Leicester with calligraphy by John de Beauchesne. Heroica Eulogia, manuscript HM 160 fol. 11, Huntington Library.

John de Beauchesne, also known as John de Beau Chesne, Jean de Beauchesne and Jehan de Beauchesne (c.1538 in Paris – May 1620 in London) was a French Huguenot writing master (that is, a teacher of penmanship) and calligrapher. He relocated to London around 1565, in the reign of Elizabeth I. In 1570 he co-authored A Booke containing divers sortes of hands, the first writing manual published in English. He travelled to Italy and France, where he published additional writing manuals, returning to England by 1583. In his later years he was appointed writing master to two of the children of James I, Elizabeth and Charles (later King Charles I). Beauchesne died in London in May 1620.

== Life and career ==
John de Beauchesne was born in Paris around 1538, and was probably raised a Huguenot. He is likely related to a group of printers and booksellers active in Paris in the 16th century named Beauchesne: Abraham Beauchesne (active around 1532), Julien Beauchesne (1545) and Jeanne Beauchesne, wife of the Parisian printer Jean Plumyon, killed In 1572 during the St. Bartholomew's Day Massacre.

He immigrated to London around 1565 (perhaps to find a more favourable environment for Protestant opinions); in 1567 he had been living in the ward of Farringdon Without, home to Chancery Lane and St Bartholomew's Hospital, for two years. That year he was working as a scribe for William Bowyer, Keeper of the Records in the Tower of London. Berthold Wolpe identified Beauchesne as the creator of the calligraphic pages in Bowyer's Heroica Eulogia, a manuscript dedicated (but perhaps never presented) to Robert Dudley, Earl of Leicester combining "paintings, coats of arms, Latin poems, 14 distinctive styles of handwriting, and historical documents".

In 1570, the French Huguenot printer Thomas Vautrollier published Beauchesne's A Booke containing divers sortes of hands, the first book of "copies" or sample alphabets for students to be printed in English. Its full title was

A Booke containing divers sortes of hands, as well the English as French secretarie with the Italian, Roman, Chancelrie and court hands. Also the true and just proportion of the capitall Rom(an)ae set forth by John de Beau Chesne. P(arisien) and M. John Baildon. Imprinted at London by Thomas Vautrouillier, dwelling in the blackefrieres

As Vautrollier had registered two books of "copies" of hands with the Stationers' Company in 1569, it is possible that this volume combined originally separate works by Beauchesne and by Master John Baildon, a curate of St Mildred in the Poultry. The book contains 42 woodblocks of sample alphabets and texts, covering the range of styles common in the day. A Book containing divers sortes of handes must have been a success – it was reissued by Vautrollier and his successor, Richard Field, in 1571, 1590, 1591, 1602, and 1615 (all within Beauchesne's lifetime).

Shortly after the appearance of his Booke, Beauchesne travelled to Italy, studying under several masters. By 1579 he was resident in Lyon, where he published a second treatise in 1580, Le Tresor d' Escriture, au que I est contenu tout ce qui est requis et necessaire a taus amateurs dudict art. Par jehan de Beauchesne Parisien, Avec privilege du Roi, which displays a sensitive Italian influence.

He returned to England by 1583 and about 1595 published a third treatise on handwriting, La Clef de l'Escriture, dedicated to the three daughters of Gilbert Talbot, 7th Earl of Shrewsbury. Taxpayer records of 1599 place him in the parish of St Ann Blackfriars. He was appointed writing master to the new King James I's daughter Elizabeth (to whom he dedicated a collection of manuscript examples around 1610), and her brother Charles, later King Charles I. Beauchesne was buried at Blackfriars 20 May 1620.

== Engraved works ==
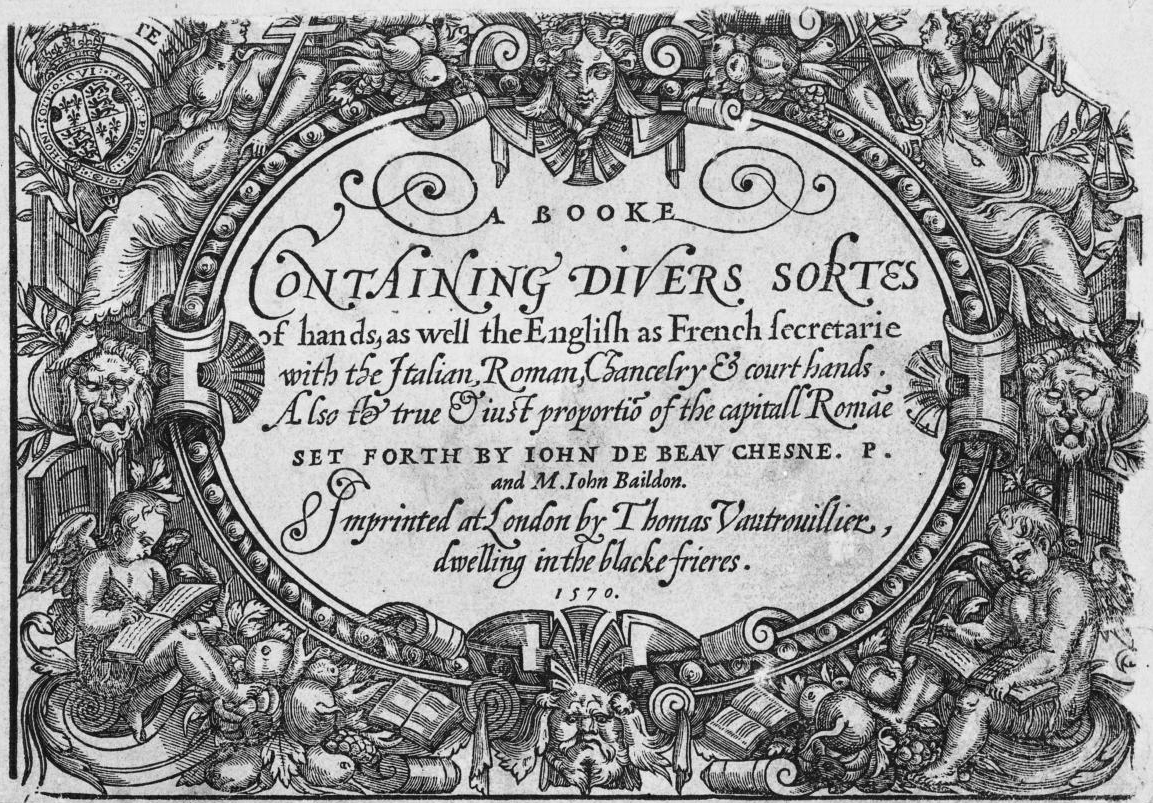
John de Beauchesne: Booke containing diverses sortes... (London, 1570).

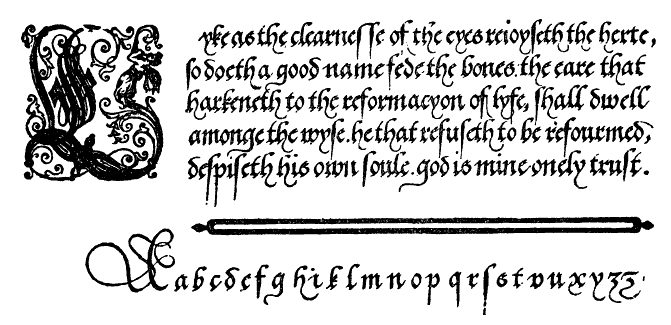
English Bastard Hand by John de Beauchesne.

- A Booke containing divers sortes of hands, as well the English as French secretarie with the Italian, Roman, chancelry & court hands. Set forth by John Beau Chesne and John Baildon. London: Thomas Vautrollier, 1570. 4 ° obl., [5] −43 f. (Chicago NL, London BL).
- Le Thresor d'Escripture auquel est contenu tout ce qui est requis et nécessaire à tout amateur du dict art. By Jehan de Paris-Nice ... chesne. Lyon: the author, Rue Merciere with the sign of the Trinity, 1580. 4 ° obl., 62 pl. woodcuts by Mathieu Greuter and dedicated to Francis Mandelot, Lieutenant General for the King in Lyon (Paris BNF, Chicago NL, Cambridge HUL). Becker 1997 No. 43.
- La Clef de l'escriture laquelle ouvre le chemin à la jeunesse, pour bien apprendre à excrire la vraye lettre françoyse & italique' London: G. Boulengier, c. 1595. Dedicated to Mary, Elizabeth and Althea Talbot, daughters of Gilbert Talbot, 7th Earl of Shrewsbury (Chicago NL).

== Manuscript works ==
- Specimens manuscrits anglais dédiés à Mme Elizabeth, fille unique du roi de Grande Bretaigne England, ca. 1610. f. (Newberry Library, Chicago. Wing MS ZW 639.B 382).
- Heroica Eulogia, William Bowyer, London, 1567 (Huntington Library, San Marino, California. HM 160). Italic and Roman calligraphic passages only.
- Calligraphic specimen, subscribed in mirror-writing "Joannes de Beau Chesne scribebat Ao. 1575". MS Typ 232. Houghton Library, Harvard University.

== See also ==
- Secretary hand
- Chancery hand
- Italic script
