= The Phoenix and the Turtle =

Poem by William Shakespeare

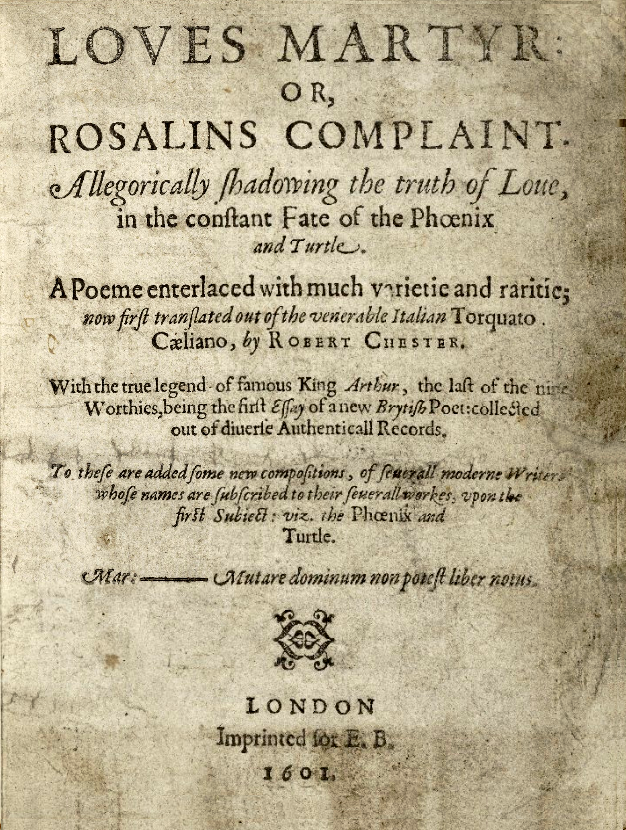
Shakespeare's poem The Phoenix and the Turtle was first published in Robert Chester's Loves Martyr (1601)

The Phoenix and the Turtle (also spelled The Phœnix and the Turtle) is an allegorical poem by William Shakespeare, first published in 1601 as a supplement to a longer work, Love's Martyr, by Robert Chester. The poem, which has been called "the first great published metaphysical poem", has many conflicting interpretations. The title "The Phoenix and the Turtle" is a conventional label. As published, the poem was untitled. The title names two birds: the mythological phoenix and the turtle dove.

The 67-line poem describes a funeral arranged for the deceased Phoenix and Turtledove, to which some birds are invited, but others excluded. The Phoenix and Turtledove are emblems of perfection and of devoted love, respectively. The traditional attribute of the Phoenix is that when it dies, it returns to life, rising from the ashes of its prior incarnation; the Turtledove, by contrast, is mortal. The poem states that the love of the birds created a perfect unity which transcended all logic and material fact. It concludes with a prayer for the dead lovers.

== Publication ==
The Phoenix and the Turtle was first published in 1601, as part of a collection of poems by different authors, including John Marston, George Chapman, and Ben Jonson, which was appended as a supplement to Love's Martyr, a long poem by Robert Chester printed by Richard Field for the London bookseller Edward Blount. The unused sheets of the first quarto were subsequently acquired by another publisher, Matthew Lownes, and reissued in 1611 under a different title, The Annuals of Great Britain. The poem did not appear in print again until 1640, when it was included in John Benson's collected edition of Shakespeare's poems, Poems Written by Wil. Shake-speare, Gent.

== Context ==
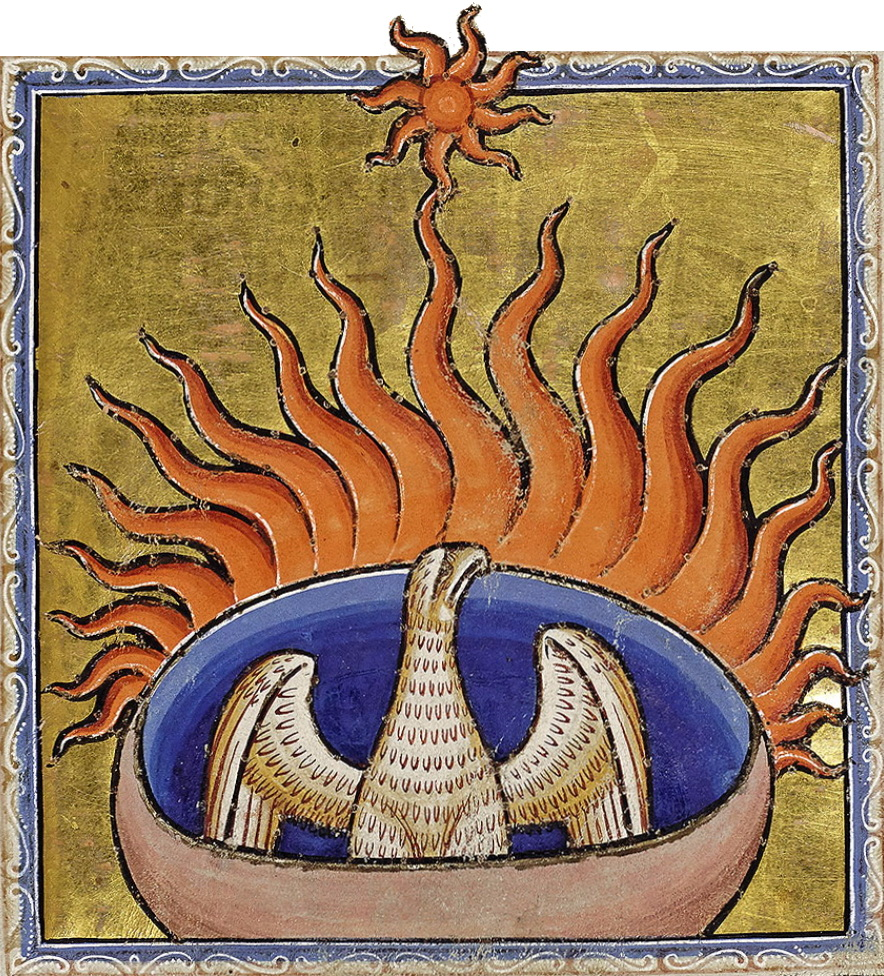
A dying-and-reborn phoenix, depicted in the Aberdeen Bestiary

The title page of the original edition of Chester's Love's Martyr explains its content:

Love's Martyr: or Rosalins Complaint. Allegorically shadowing the truth of Loue, in the constant Fate of the Phoenix and Turtle. A Poeme enterlaced with much varietie and raritie; now first translated out of the venerable Italian Torquato Caeliano, by Robert Chester. With the true legend of famous King Arthur the last of the nine Worthies, being the first Essay of a new Brytish Poet: collected out of diuerse Authenticall Records. To these are added some new compositions of seuerall moderne Writers whose names are subscribed to their seuerall workes, vpon the first subiect viz. the Phoenix and Turtle.

Chester prefaced his poem with a short dedication addressed to the Phoenix and Turtledove. The Phoenix is envisaged as female and the dove as male:

Phoenix of beautie, beauteous, Bird of any
To thee I do entitle all my labour,
More precious in mine eye by far then many
That feedst all earthly sences with thy savour:
Accept my home-writ praises of thy love,
And kind acceptance of thy Turtle-dove

Chester's main poem is a long allegory in which the relationship between the birds is explored, and its symbolism articulated. It incorporates the story of King Arthur, and a history of ancient Britain, emphasising Welsh etymologies for British towns. It culminates with the joint immolation of the Phoenix and Turtledove, giving birth to a new and more beautiful bird from the ashes. It also includes several allegorical love poems within it, supposed to have been written by the Turtledove to the Phoenix.

It is followed by a brief collection of "Diverse Poeticall Essaies" by the "best and chiefest of our moderne writers, with their names sub-scribed to their particular workes". These include, in addition to Shakespeare, Ben Jonson, George Chapman, John Marston and the anonymous "Vatum Chorus" and "Ignoto". All the poems use the same imagery. The series is introduced by Vatum Chorus and Ignoto, followed by Shakespeare's The Phoenix and the Turtle, which ends with mourning for the death of the perfect lovers, "leaving no posterity". Marston then seems to reply to Shakespeare's "moving epicedium", by referring to the couple's "glorious issue": the being born from the flames. Chapman adds more detail on the relationship, saying that the Phoenix provided every variety of life to the Turtle, "She was to him the Analysed World of pleasure, / Her firmness cloth'd him in variety". Jonson ends with an idealisation of the Phoenix, whose judgment shines as "Clear as a naked Vestal, / Closed in an orb of Crystal."

== Interpretations ==
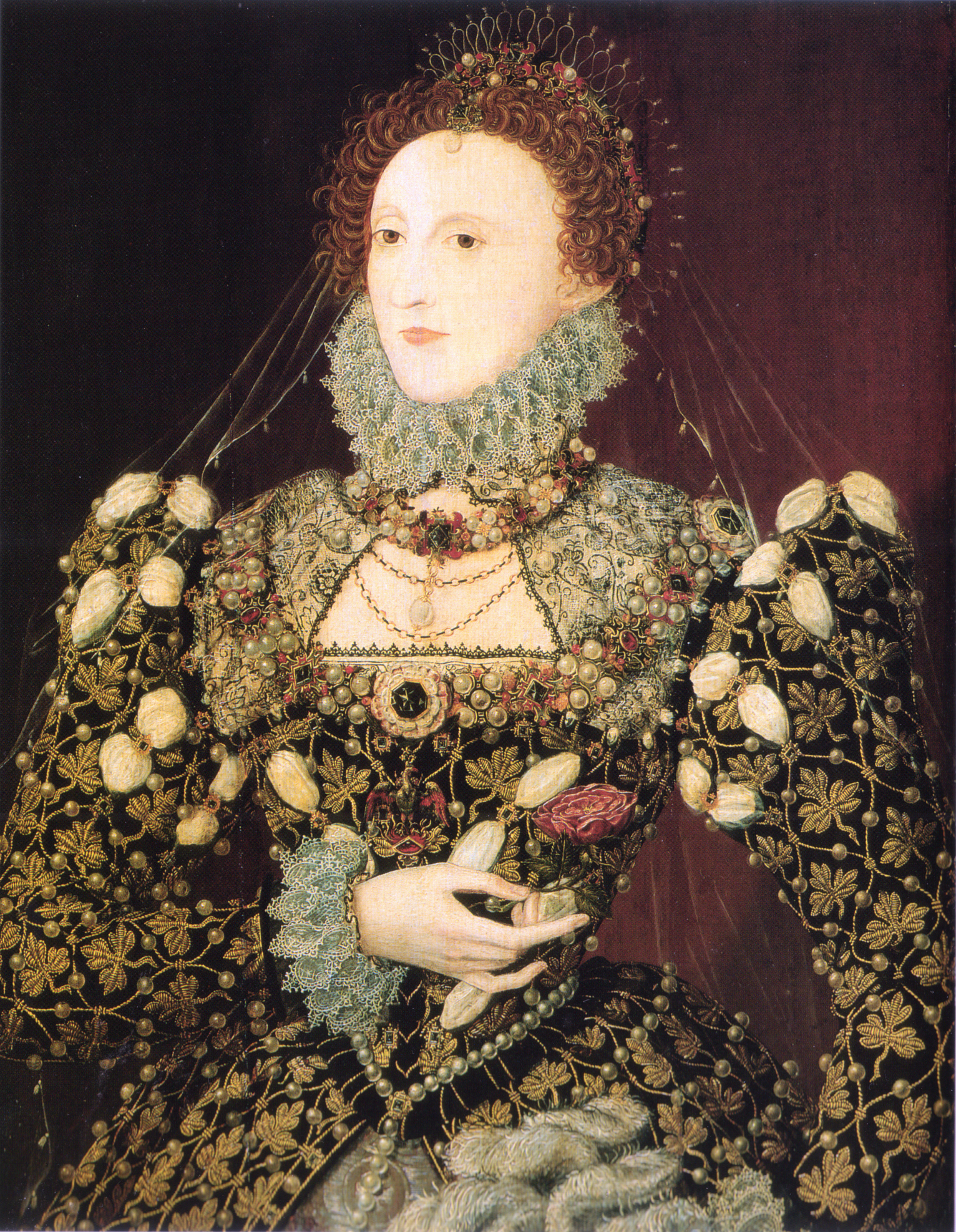
The Phoenix portrait of Queen Elizabeth, in which she wears her personal badge of the phoenix.

The Phoenix and the Turtle is interpreted as an allegory of an ideal marriage. In addition the poem can be seen as an elucidation of the relationship between truth and beauty, or of fulfilled love, in the context of Renaissance Neoplatonism.

The concept of a symbolic perfect love between two very different beings, one immortal and one mortal, may be associated with the Christian doctrine of the Holy Trinity, as suggested in the lines "So they lov'd, as love in twain/ Had the essence but in one;/Two distincts, division none." The poem also suggests the confluence of three other lines of medieval Catholic tradition: the literary traditions of mystical union, spiritual friendship, and spiritual marriage. Shakespeare introduces a number of other birds, drawing on earlier literature about the "parliament of birds", to portray the death of the lovers as the loss of an ideal that can only be lamented.

Several attempts have been made to link the lovers of the poem to historical individuals, though others have argued that the poem should not be interpreted with "appliqué literalism", in the words of James P. Bednarz. Exponents of the New Criticism such as I. A. Richards and William Empson emphasised the unresolvable nature of the text's ambiguities. Helen Hackett argues that the poem "incites deciphering, but at the same time firmly rebuffs it." Some of the more prominent attempted decodings of the allegory with reference to real individuals are listed below:

=== John and Ursula Salusbury ===
Because Chester dedicated the main poem to the Welsh statesman Sir John Salusbury and his wife Ursula Stanley, it has been argued that all the poems in the collection, including Shakespeare's, also celebrate the couple. Salusbury was a courtier at the court of Elizabeth I, and was a member of the powerful Salusbury Family of Wales. His wife Ursula was the illegitimate daughter of Henry Stanley, 4th Earl of Derby. A difficulty with this view is the fact that the couple are known to have had ten children, but the poem refers to the relationship as a childless "married chastity". This is commented on elsewhere in the collection by John Marston, and all the poems in the collection emphasise the chaste and spiritual nature of the relationship, the couple's only child being the mysterious being born from their bodily deaths. The identification of the Salusburys as the subject was first argued in detail by Carleton Brown in 1913. Brown tried to resolve the problem by arguing that it was written after the birth of the couple's first child, but not published until many years later. Later writers have sometimes argued that while Chester's Love's Martyr may be intended to celebrate the couple, Shakespeare's own poem does not. John Klause suggests that the "death" implied in Chester's work is symbolic of marriage and "sexual surrender", but in Shakespeare's poem death is literal. G. Wilson Knight suggested that the poem celebrates chaste love because it is about Salusbury's devotion to his sister, for whom Salusbury himself had written a poem.

=== Queen Elizabeth ===
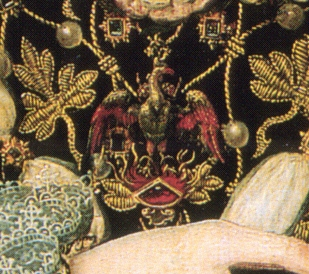
Elizabeth's Phoenix jewel from the Phoenix portrait

An alternative is to interpret the Turtle as John Salusbury and the Phoenix as Queen Elizabeth I, which would explain the chastity of the relationship and the implication that their "child" is something mystical rather than physical. Elizabeth was often connected to the phoenix, and she is referred to as the "maiden phoenix" in the play Henry VIII, partly written by Shakespeare (though the "maiden phoenix" passage is typically attributed to John Fletcher). Two panel portraits attributed to Nicholas Hilliard are known as the "Phoenix" and "Pelican" portraits because of jewels the queen wears: her personal badges of the pelican and the phoenix. Both birds appear in Chester's main poem. An objection is that the intimacy between the lovers seems rather too strong for Salusbury and the queen.

Katherine Duncan-Jones and Henry Woudhuysen adopt a variation of the view that the poem refers to Salusbury and the queen, arguing that the "session" mentioned in the poem is the 1601 parliament, in which Elizabeth made a famous speech about the symbolic relationship between herself and her people, sometimes referred to as her Farewell Speech. They draw on the earlier work of Marie Axton, who argued that Elizabeth herself is both birds, in her monarchical and human aspects, but that the human aspect (the Turtle) also includes the body of the people as a whole. Duncan-Jones and Woudhuysen suggest that Salusbury represents the people.

Some scholars interpret the child of the phoenix as a reference to Elizabeth's heir, James VI of Scotland. This imagery was used in 1604, when James arrived in London, but this would have been problematic in 1601, when Elizabeth was still alive.

The theory that both Chester's and Shakespeare's poems were intended to refer to the relationship between Elizabeth and Robert Devereux, Earl of Essex was first proposed by A.B. Grosart in 1878, and was revived by William Matchett in 1965. Many authors who reject the identification of the lovers as Essex and Elizabeth nevertheless argue that the events of Essex's rebellion and execution in early 1601 may lie behind some of the more obscure symbolism in the poem and the others in the collection. Sir John Salusbury had been knighted for helping to suppress the rebellion, while his cousin Owen Salusbury was killed while participating in it. Sir John's brother, Thomas Salusbury, had been executed after the earlier Babington Plot against Elizabeth. Duncan-Jones and Woudhuysen argue that Salusbury was "love's martyr" for putting devotion to his queen above his family. Peter Ackroyd and James P. Bednarz both argue that Shakespeare may have written the poem to dissociate himself from Essex, with whom he was implicated because of his links to Essex's main ally the Earl of Southampton, and because his play about the overthrow of a monarch, Richard II, had been performed at the request of the rebels. For Bednarz "Shakespeare's name, subscribed to his poem in Love's Martyr shows his accommodation to the political order without endorsing any specific political position."

=== Catholic martyrs ===
Another interpretation, first proffered in the 1930s by Clara Longworth in the novel My Shakespeare, Rise! is that the poem is a cryptic Roman Catholic eulogy and is part of the contention that Shakespeare was a secret Catholic sympathiser. The advocacy of prayers for the dead ("these dead birds") in the final line of the poem corroborates this interpretation. Several critics, including Clare Asquith and David Beauregard, have noted that the poem ostensibly references Catholic liturgy and possibly the writings of the Catholic priest and poet Rev. Robert Southwell, SJ, who translated the Latin hymn Lauda Sion and also authored a poem praising the married chastity of Saint Mary and Saint Joseph. John Klause argued that the poem has various parallels to the Dies Irae of the Liturgy for the Dead, but suggests that its Catholic imagery satirises conventional Protestant attitudes expressed in Chester's poem, and that it is a subtle protest against the lauding of Sir John Salusbury, whose imagined death he supposes the poem celebrates.

Proponents of the Catholic interpretation have suggested various identities for the poem's birds, but the interpretation that has the most traction is that the phoenix commemorates St. Anne Line, a Roman Catholic executed at Tyburn in 1601 and subsequently canonised by the Roman Catholic Church as a martyr. St. Anne Line and her young husband Roger were separated when he was imprisoned and then exiled after being arrested at a prohibited Catholic Mass. He died on the European continent a few years later and St. Anne began working for the Jesuits in London. She was arrested at a Candlemas liturgy and convicted of harbouring a Catholic priest, which led to her execution. Her body was retrieved from the common grave in the road and one of the Jesuits who knew her hinted that a secret requiem Mass was later offered for her. It was suggested that this requiem Mass provided the setting for Shakespeare's poem. The identification was corroborated by the belief that, like Shakespeare's couple, the Lines had no children. However, it has been proven since that they had a son named "John", whom relatives adopted.

Clara Longworth first suggested that St. Anne Line is Shakespeare's phoenix and Mark Barkworth, a Catholic priest who reportedly embraced her body as it hung on the scaffold before he was also executed, is the turtle. John Finnis and Patrick Martin argued more recently that St. Anne Line is the phoenix and her husband Roger is the turtle. They concur with Clare Asquith that the "bird of loudest lay" represents the composer William Byrd, who was a Roman Catholic convert, and that the crow is the Catholic priest Rev. Henry Garnet, SJ. Martin Dodwell argued further that Shakespeare used St. Anne and Roger Line to symbolise the Catholic Church itself, as disinherited and rejected by England.

== Bibliography ==
- Gillham, Christiane (1992). "'Single Nature's Double Name': Some Comments on The Phoenix and Turtle". Connotations. 2 (2): 126–136.
- Gillham, Christiane (1993–1994). "Single Natures–Double Name: A Reply to Peter Milward and James H. Sims". Connotations. 3 (2): 123–128.
- Kerrigan, John (2013a). "Reading 'The Phoenix and Turtle'". In Post, Jonathan (ed.). Oxford Handbook of Shakespeare's Poetry. Oxford: Oxford University Press. pp. 540–559. ISBN 978-0198778011.
- Kerrigan, John (2013b). "Shakespeare, Elegy and Epitaph: 1557–1640". In Post, Jonathan (ed.). Oxford Handbook of Shakespeare's Poetry. Oxford: Oxford University Press. pp. 225–244. ISBN 978-0198778011.
- Milward, Peter (1993–1994). "'Double Nature's Single Name': A Response to Christiane Gillham". Connotations. 3 (1): 60–63.
- Shakespeare, William (28 September 2007). Duncan-Jones, Katherine; Woudhuyson, H.R. (eds.). Shakespeare's Poems. Arden Shakespeare (published 2007). ISBN 978-1903436868.
- Sims, James H. (1993–1994). "Shakespeare's 'The Phoenix and the Turtle': A Reconsideration of 'Single Natures Double Name'". Connotations. 3 (1): 64–71.
- Straumann, Heinrich (1977). "'The phoenix and the turtle' in its dramatic context". English Studies. 58 (6): 494–500. doi:10.1080/00138387708597857.
