= Frederic Salusbury =

British journalist and diplomat

Sir Frederic Hamilton Piozzi Salusbury (17 November 1895 – 13 December 1957) was an Australian-born British journalist and diplomat. He was also a member of the Salusbury Family.

== Biography ==
Salusbury became a second lieutenant in the King's Shropshire Light Infantry (KSLI) in 1916, during the First World War. He served for three years in the regiment before being demobilized. After the war, became a judge's associate in the High Court of Australia and then, in 1922, came to Britain where after a spell of free lance journalism and film acting he joined the Daily Express where he was editor of the Beachcomber column. Salusbury served as a war correspondent in the Mediterranean during the Second World War and subsequently received his first posting as the acting British Ambassador to Greece due to his personal friendship with Paul of Greece. He later created the English edition of the Kathimerini after buying a majority holding in the paper. He was the editor of the Egyptian Gazetta in Cairo from 1952 to 1954.
