= Thomas Vautrollier =

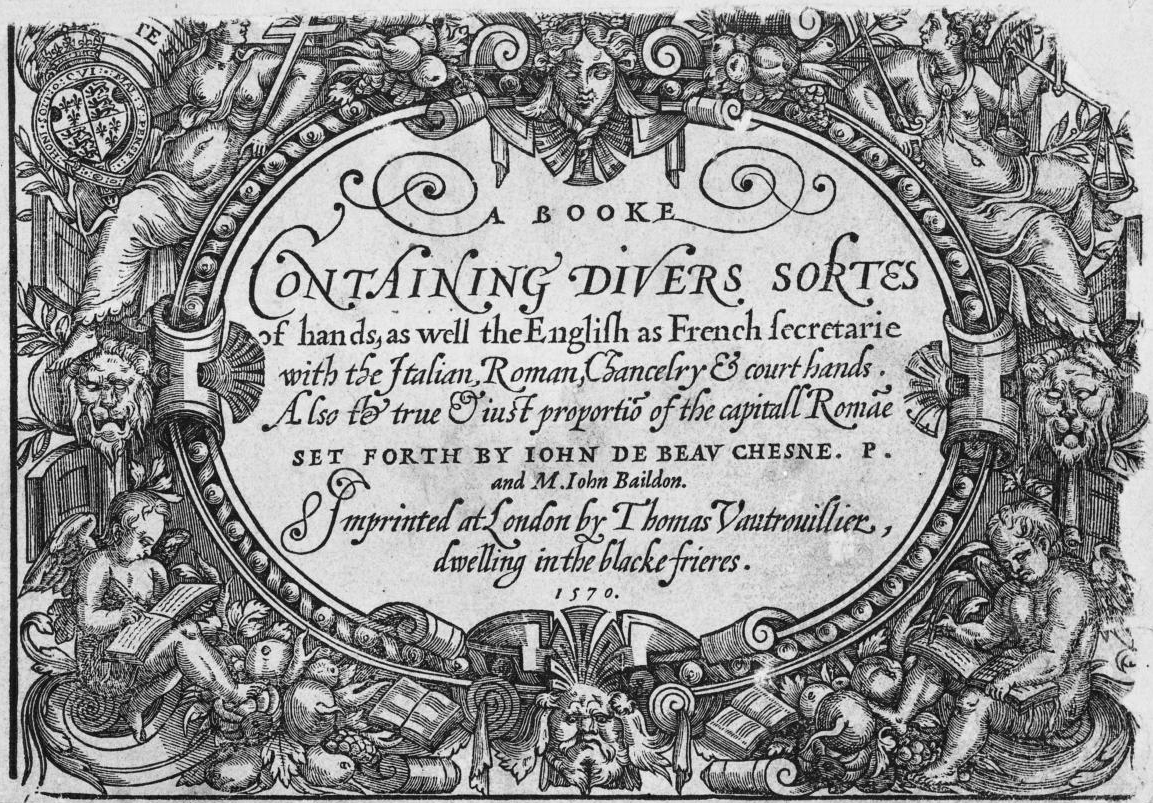
Title page to Vautrollier's first publication in England, A Booke containing divers sortes of hands (1570).

Thomas Vautrollier or Vautroullier (died 1587) was a French Huguenot refugee who became a printer in England and, briefly, in Scotland.

Vautrollier emigrated to London from Paris or Rouen about the beginning of the reign of Elizabeth I (1558), and was granted letters of denization on 9 March 1562. He was admitted a brother of the Stationers' Company on 2 October 1564, and probably worked as a servant to some printer until 1570, when he established a press in Blackfriars. In 1570 he issued his first publication in London, A Booke containing divers sortes of hands. This was the first writing-book to be printed in English. In full, the title page read

A Booke containing divers sortes of hands, as well the English as French secretarie with the Italian, Roman, Chancelrie and court hands. Also the true and just proportion of the capitall Rom(an)ae set forth by John de Beau Chesne. P(arisien) and M. John Baildon. Imprinted at London by Thomas Vautrouillier, dwelling in the blackefrieres

As Vautrollier had registered two books of "copies" or sample alphabets with the Stationers' Company in 1569, it is possible that this volume combined originally separate works by the writing-master John de Beauchesne and by Master John Baildon, a curate of St Mildred in the Poultry.

In 1578 he printed Special and Chosen Sermons of D. Martin Luther, without a license, and was fined 10s., and in the following year was fined for a similar offence. Shortly thereafter – the exact date is unknown – Vautrollier arrived in Edinburgh with a letter of introduction to George Buchanan. He brought a large supply of books with him, and traded as a bookseller for several years before he started a press. In January 1580 he sold books to Peter Young for the king's library costing £100 Scots.

During his absence from London, the press there was in full operation under the management of his wife. It appears that Vautrollier returned to London, and shortly afterwards had to leave for Edinburgh again, as it is supposed he had incurred the displeasure of the Star Chamber by the publication of Giordano Bruno's Last Tromp, dedicated to Sir Philip Sidney. Having succeeded in establishing his press in Edinburgh in 1584, Vautrollier was patronised by James VI, and printed the first of the king's published works, The Essayes of a Prentise in the Divine Art of Poesie (1584), and, at the desire of the king, an English translation of Guillaume de Salluste Du Bartas's History of Judith (1584) — both issued cum privilegio regali.

James Stewart, Earl of Arran sent copies of the king's poetry book, The Essayes of a Prentise in the Divine Art of Poesie, bound in orange vellum, to Cecil and Lord Hunsdon on 28 December 1584.

In 1584 Vautrollier printed six distinct works, and in the following year only two. In 1586 he returned to London, having obtained his pardon, taking with him a manuscript copy of John Knox's History of the Reformation, which he "put to press, but all the copies were seized [by the order of Archbishop Whitgift] before the work was completed". His four children were born in Scotland.

Despite these conflicts with the authorities, Vautrollier quickly became one of the most highly thought-of printers in London. He was especially associated with the printing of works of Protestant theology including John Calvin's Institutes and a Latin version of the Book of Common Prayer. He also printed Ovid, Cicero, and other standard classical authors whose works were in demand as schoolbooks. At one point Vautrollier obtained the right to "the sole printinge of other latten [Latin] bookes as the Newe Testament".

Among his publications were textbooks such as Richard Mulcaster's Positions, a manual on child-rearing, and his Elementarie, a grammar book on "right writing of our English tung".

In 1579 Richard Field from Stratford-upon-Avon, a schoolfellow of William Shakespeare, was apprenticed to Vautrollier. After Vautrollier died, Field worked with his widow Jacqueline to run the business, which continued to concentrate on Protestant polemics. Field and Jacqueline were married in 1589, two years after her first husband's death.

== Music printing ==
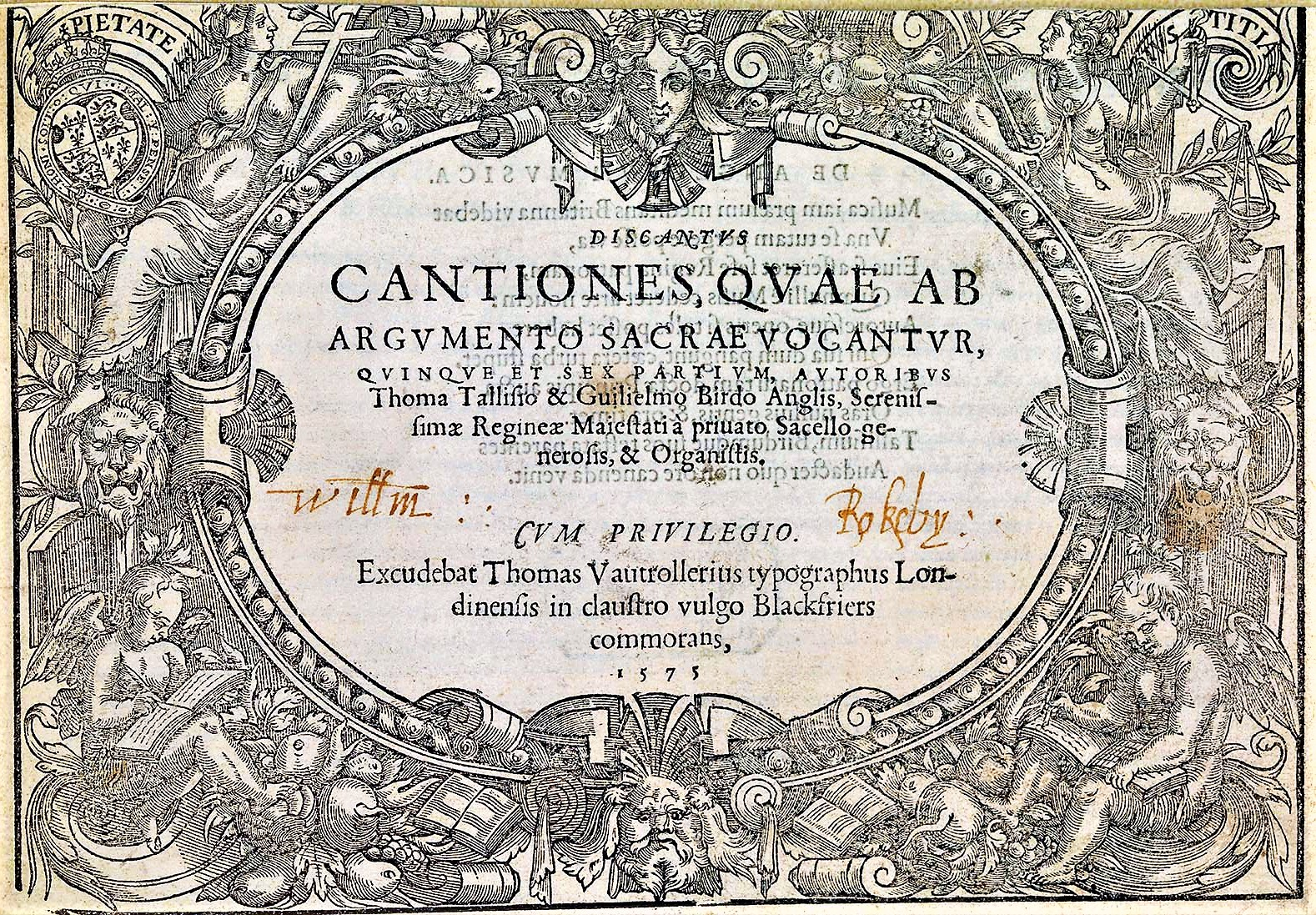
Cantiones sacrae

Vautrollier also printed music, working with the Roman Catholic composers William Byrd and Thomas Tallis who were granted a monopoly of music printing in 1575. After Vautrollier´s death, his widow and Richard Field appear not to have been interested in the musical side of the business, and another printer Thomas East acquired the fount of music type. East specialised in music printing as the assignee of Byrd (Tallis having predeceased Vautrollier).
