= John Salusbury (died 1540s) =

Welsh courtier and politician

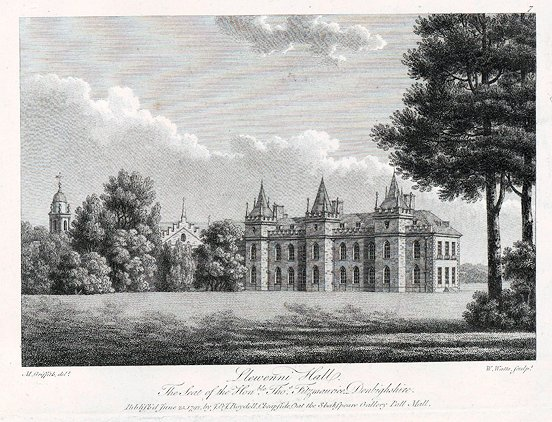
Llewenni Hall, his childhood home

John Salusbury (by 1485 – 1547/1549) was a Welsh courtier and politician, member of the Salusbury family.

He was a younger son of Sir Thomas Salusbury of Lleweni Hall, Denbighshire.

Salsbury was a Groom of the Chamber by 1506 and a Sewer by 1509. He was Constable of Conwy Castle, Caernarvonshire by 1526 and an Esquire of the Body by 1530.

Then he was Constable of Denbigh Castle from 1530 to 1536, a member of the Council of Ireland in 1535 and chancellor and chamberlain of the new county of Denbighshire (previously the Steward for the district) from August 1536 to death.

He was appointed the first High Sheriff of Denbighshire for 1540–41 and finally served as a justice of the peace and Custos Rotulorum of Denbighshire and Montgomeryshire from 1543 to his death.

Salsbury was elected the first knight of the shire (MP) in the Parliament of England for the newly created Denbighshire in 1542.

He married and had at least two sons. One of his descendants was John Salesbury (MP), father of Robert Salesbury (MP), members of the Salusbury family of Rug.
