= John Salisbury =

John Salisbury may refer to:

- John Salisbury (footballer) (1872-1931), Welsh footballer, see 1894–95 Manchester City F.C. season
- John Salisbury (MP) for Leominster (UK Parliament constituency)
- John Salisbury (athlete) (born 1934), British athlete
- John Salisbury (bishop) (died 1573), Welsh clergyman
- John Kenneth Salisbury Jr., American roboticist
- John of Salisbury (c. 1120–1180), English author, educationalist, diplomat and bishop of Chartres

== See also ==
- John Salusbury (disambiguation)
