= John Lloyd (MP for Denbighshire) =

Welsh politician

John Lloyd (c. 1560 – 1606), knight of Bodridis, Llanarmon yn Iâl, Denbighshire, was a Welsh politician.

He was born to Sir Evan Lloyd. John was a Member (MP) of the Parliament of England for Denbighshire in 1597.

He married Margaret, daughter of John Salesbury (MP).
