= John Salusbury (poet) =

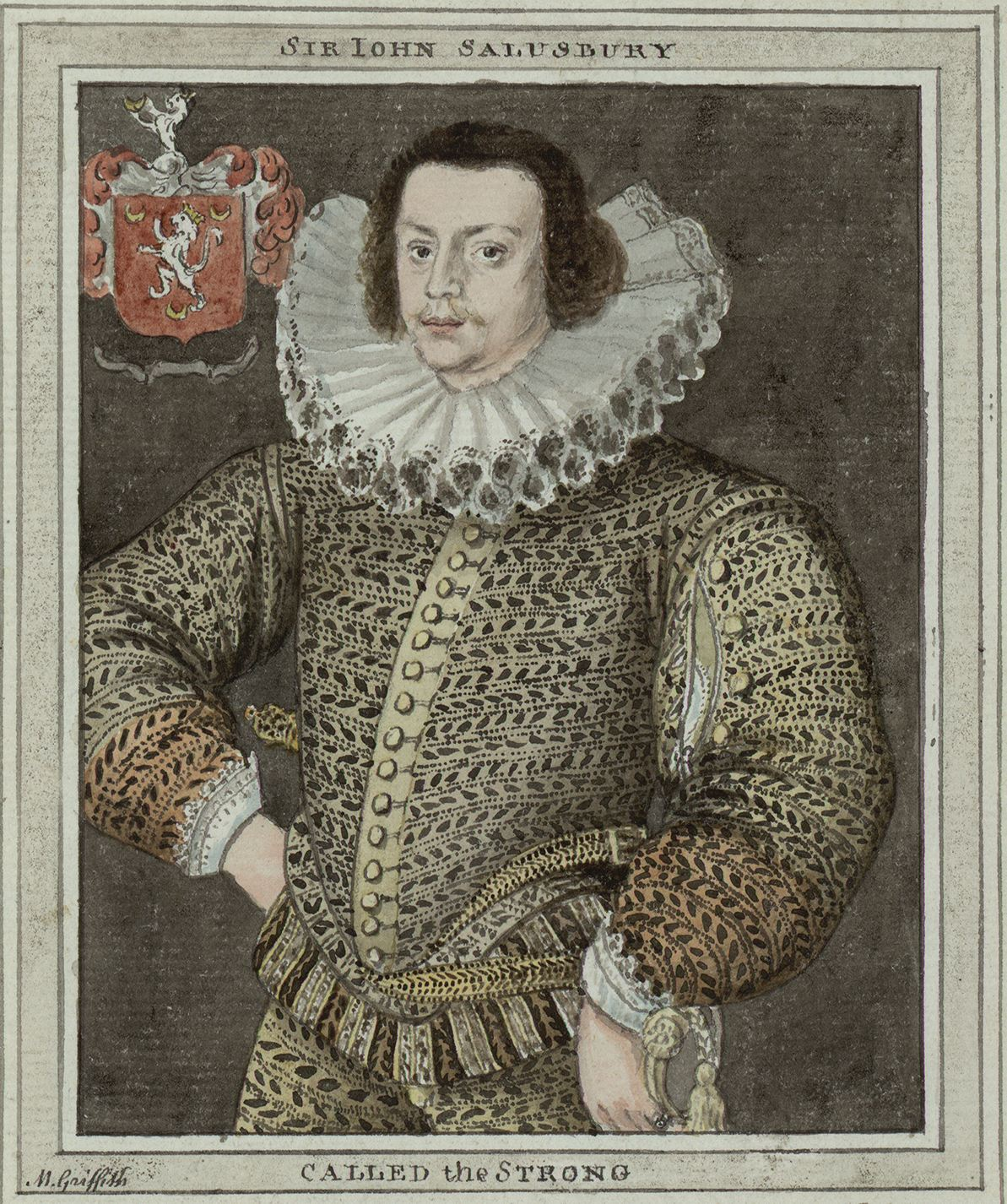
- An 18th-century copy of a portrait of Sir John Salusbury
- Born: 1567
- Died: 24 July 1612 (aged 44–45)
- Occupations: Statesman; poet; patron
- Years active: 1585–1612
- Notable work: Sinetes Passions; Love's Martyr

Sir John Salusbury (1567 – 24 July 1612) was a Welsh knight, politician and poet of the Elizabethan era. He is notable for his opposition to the faction of Robert Devereux, 2nd Earl of Essex, and for his patronage of complex acrostic and allegorical poetry that anticipated the Metaphysical movement.

== Life ==
Salusbury was a member of the Salusbury family of Lleweni in the Vale of Clwyd, Denbighshire, where they owned a considerable estate, including Lleweni Hall. Various members of the family acquired honours and appointments through their support of the Tudor monarchs. He was the son of Sir John Salusbury and Katheryn of Berain, and the younger brother of Thomas Salusbury, who was executed in 1586 for his involvement in the Babington Plot against Elizabeth I.

He was born in 1567 and educated at Jesus College, Oxford, where he matriculated in 1581 aged 14. After his brother's execution, he succeeded to the estates, but the family's lands were severely reduced due to the loss of crown leases. It took him several years to restore them. He studied law at the Middle Temple from March 1595. Elizabeth appointed him as squire of the body in the same year. Salusbury became noted for his "ostentatious loyalty" to the queen, in contrast to other members of his family, who were associated with Catholic sympathies and plots against her. Salusbury was a staunch Protestant, writing to the queen's minister, Robert Cecil denouncing recusants. He was also an opponent of the Earl of Essex, with whose supporters he came into conflict in local politics. He almost killed his cousin Owen, an Essex supporter, in a sword fight in 1593. Owen was already being treated with suspicion as a potential rebel, so the duel did Salusbury no harm. The 5th Earl of Derby, his wife's brother, wrote to congratulate him for beating "that bad fellow of your name", saying that the event would be to the "advancement of your credit".

After the Essex Rebellion, on 14 June 1601, Salusbury was knighted for his support in suppressing it. His cousins Owen and John were implicated in the rebellion, Owen being killed in the fighting. These conflicts led to the "Wrexham riot" in October 1601, during an election to parliament, in which Salusbury's supporters engaged in violent clashes with the surviving Essex supporters led by Sir Richard Trevor. Salusbury complained to the queen about intimidation. After a recount, he was declared the winner of the election. He became MP for Denbighshire in December 1601, but only took his seat for a few days before parliament was dissolved.

After Elizabeth's death, Essex's surviving supporters returned to favour at the court of her successor James I. Thereafter, Salusbury spent little time in London, with his enemies attempting to discredit him at court. Salusbury took an interest in gardening, botany, and herbal medicine at Lleweni. His copy of Gerard's Herbal survives at Christ Church, Oxford with annotations describing plants and herbs found in Welsh gardens or growing wild around the year 1606, with some of his notes of recipes. He died on 24 July 1612.

== Family ==
Salusbury married Ursula Stanley, the illegitimate daughter of Henry Stanley, 4th Earl of Derby and Jane Halsall, in 1586. Their first child, Jane, was born on 6 October 1586. The couple went on to have ten children, of whom six survived to adulthood: four girls and two boys. His son Henry Salusbury became the first of the Salusbury Baronets in 1619.

== Literature ==
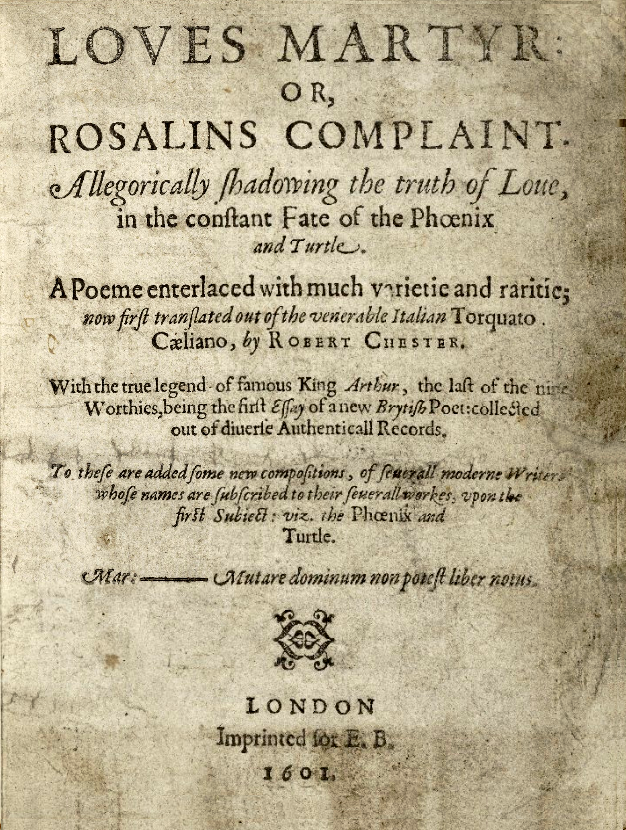
The title page of Chester's Love's Martyr, dedicated to Salusbury

Salusbury was a poet and patron of literature. Several works were dedicated to him. In 1595 Henry Perry dedicated his book of Welsh grammar Egluryn Ffraethineb to Salusbury. Sinetes Passions (1597) a collection of verse by Robert Parry, was also dedicated to Salusbury. The most important work linked to Salusbury is Robert Chester's book Love's Martyr, which is dedicated to Sir John.

Both Parry and Chester seem to have been local Denbighshire writers who formed part of Salusbury's own circle. Salusbury's own poetry may have been published in Parry's collection in the section entitled the "patron's pathetical posies", though this has been disputed. These include a complex symbolic poem addressed to his sister-in-law, Dorothy Halsall. Other sonnets and love lyrics of his exist in manuscripts.

Chester was probably Salusbury's chaplain or secretary. His long and extremely obscure allegory about a phoenix and turtledove has led to several conflicting interpretations. The most common are that it symbolises either the love of John and Ursula, or alternatively the idealised relationship between Sir John and Queen Elizabeth. Chester's poem contains a series of "Cantos" at the end of the allegory. William Empson argues that the "Cantos" are by Salusbury, as they are similar in style to those appended to Robert Parry's book, displaying Salusbury's "very recognisable facility and ingenuity". E. A. J. Honigmann argues that Salusbury had a fascination with "mystical verse" which contained obscure acrostic puzzles, and that his patronage explains the unique metaphysical symbolism of Parry's, Chester's and his own verse.

Salusbury also seems to have been acquainted with Ben Jonson, who may have been the person responsible for organising a group of important poets to contribute verses to supplement Chester's poems. Among these were Jonson himself, John Marston, George Chapman and William Shakespeare, who contributed The Phoenix and the Turtle. These poems share the imagery of Love's Martyr and Salusbury's typical elusive and complex allegorising.
