= Thomas Salisbury =

Sir Thomas Salisbury (or Salusbury) (1564 – 21 September 1586) was one of the conspirators executed for his involvement in the Babington Plot.

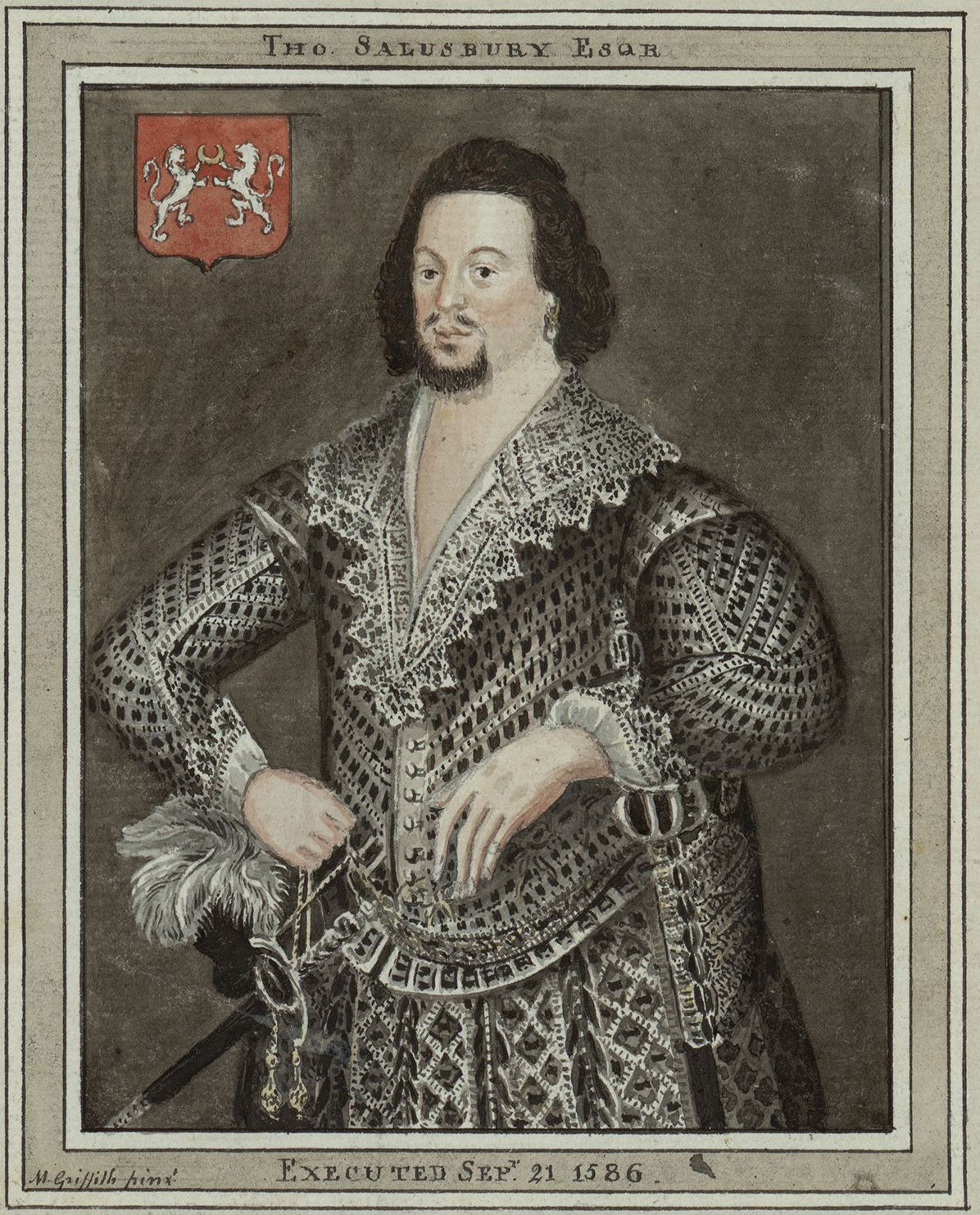
18th century copy of a portrait of Sir Thomas Salisbury

== Early life ==
Salisbury was the elder son of Katheryn of Berain and her first husband, Sir John Salusbury, and was the heir to the Lleweni Estate. Salisbury's father died in 1566 shortly after the birth of his second son Sir John Salusbury. He married Margaret Wynn (daughter of Katheryn's third husband, Maurice Wynn) in 1575 through a child marriage. Salisbury did not assent to the marriage, and the couple were estranged for a period prior to the birth of their daughter Margaret. Salisbury's daughter Margaret would eventually inherit Berain, whereas Lleweni went to Thomas's younger brother, Sir John Salusbury.

== Babington Plot ==
In 1580, Salisbury joined a group of other young Catholic gentlemen in loyalty to Mary, Queen of Scots. During this time he became acquainted with Sir Anthony Babington. In September 1586, Salisbury was implicated in the Babington Plot to murder Queen Elizabeth I and replace her with Mary, Queen of Scots, and was executed by being hanged, drawn and quartered along with five other conspirators on 21 September, following the execution the previous day of Anthony Babington.
