= Salusbury family =

Anglo-Welsh family

Salusbury
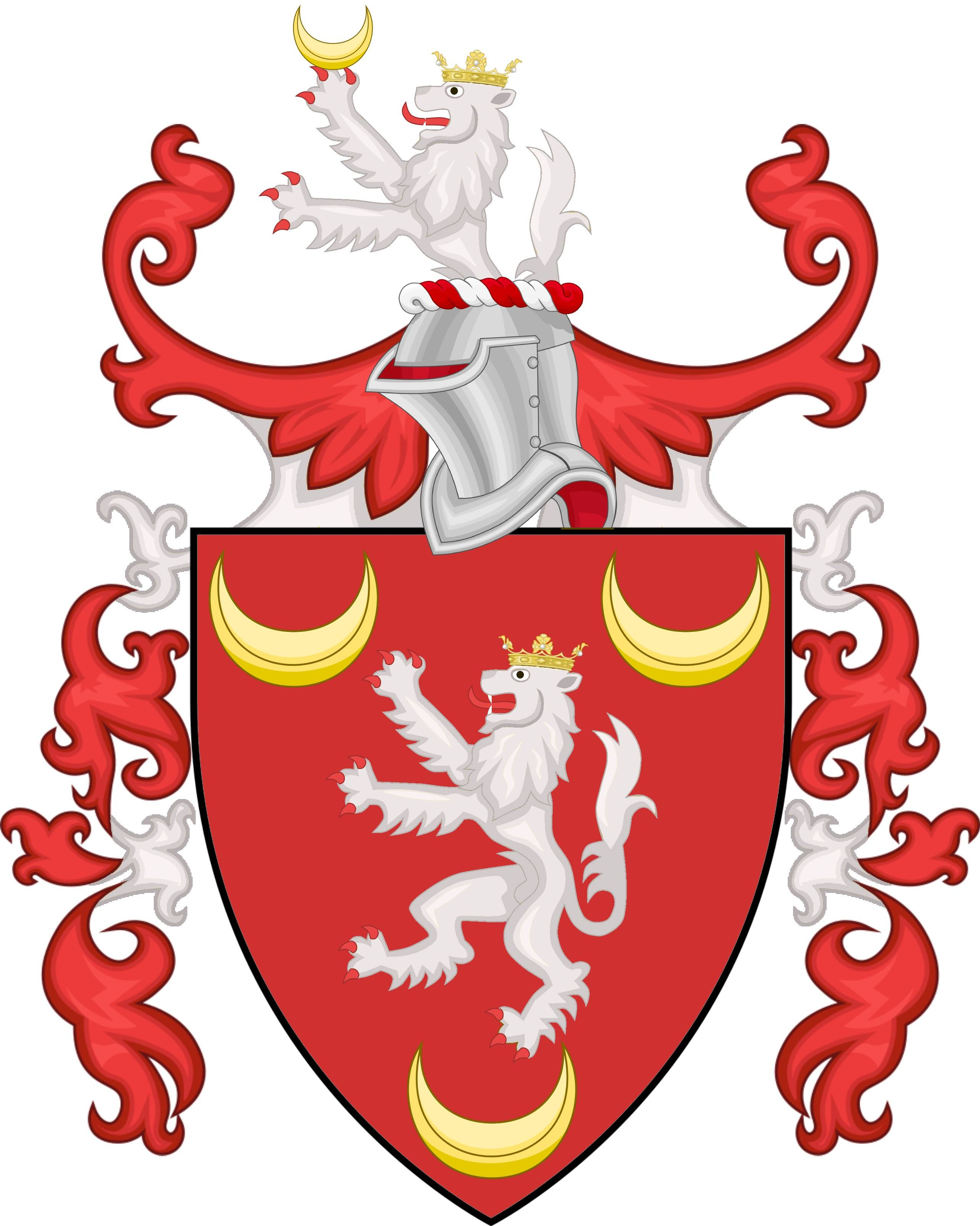
- The arms and crest of the Salusbury family at Lleweni
- Country: United Kingdom
- Current region: North Wales, North England
- Earlier spellings: Salusbury, Salesbury, Salisbury
- Members: John Salusbury (MP); William Salesbury; Thomas Salisbury; John Salusbury (poet); John Salusbury (diarist)
- Connected families: Myddelton family; Cotton baronets
- Estate: Lleweni Hall

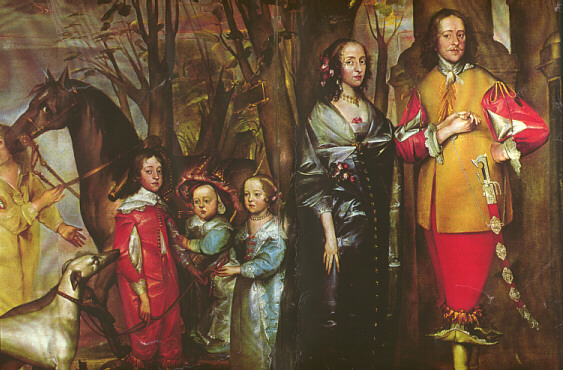
Sir Thomas Salusbury, 2nd Baronet and his family

The Salusbury family (also rendered Salisbury or Salesbury) was an Anglo-Welsh family notable for their social prominence, wealth, literary contributions and philanthropy. They were patrons of the arts and were featured in William Shakespeare's The Phoenix and the Turtle and other works. The family mostly rose in power by supporting the rising Tudor dynasty.

== Early history ==
John Williams, in Ancient and Modern Denbigh, traces back the family to Adam de Salzburg, a Bavarian knight from Salzburg who claimed descent from Charlemagne and who came over with William the Conqueror during the Norman Conquest, when he states that the toponymic surname Salzburg was anglicised into Salusbury.

Hester Lynch Piozzi (1740–1821) recalls visiting a Benedictine convent in Salzburg where she was shown records of a "young Prince Adam" who came over with William the Conqueror. Prince Adam was supposedly granted a large estate in Richmondshire, where he built a residence called Salzburg Court.

Furthermore, Williams traces the family's arrival in Denbighshire to the reign of Henry II, when Adam de Saltzburg is recorded as Captain of the Garrison of Denbigh.

The Salusburys may have been present in the Vale of Clwyd as early as 1089, as a John Salusbury is recorded as residing in the area. This John was father of Syr Harri Ddu (or Sir Harry the Black), the namesake of the North Welsh traditional virtuoso fantasia arranged for harps. Sir Harry the Black is also regarded as the founder of Lleweni Hall, or at the very least, the family that would reside there.

Sir Thomas Salusbury was a crusader, and may have been involved in the Siege of Acre. His son Sir John (d. 1289) also may have been a crusader. Sir John founded the Carmelite Priory in Denbigh. He was buried in the chapel; the inscription on his tomb is as follows:

"Orate pro a’i’a Joh’is Salusburie Armigeri, qui quidem Joh’es Salusburie obiit ii die Mensis Martii A.D. 1289, cujus a’i’e p’picietur Deus." (page 24)

In 1416 John Salusbury was elected to represent Leominster in the House of Commons.

Thomas Salusbury fought at the Battle of Blackheath (1497) and was knighted by Henry VII and appointed steward of the Lordship of Denbigh.

== Flourishment during the Tudor Period ==
Over generations through carefully cultivated matrilineal alliances with powerful Welsh heiresses, the Salusbury family became possessed of immense territories across North Wales resulting in many different branches of the family being settled in Bachymbyd, Bachegraig, Rug, Llewesog, Maescadarn, Brynbarcut, Dolbeledr, Plasisa, Brynsyllty, Berthddu. Henblas, and Llanrwst with large estates at Lleprog, Clocaenog, Llanrhaiadr, Llanfwrog, Llandyrnog, Gwytherin, and the previously mentioned Lleweni.

The estate and family of Lleweni remained the most powerful of the many branches of the Salusbury family tree, particularly in the Tudor period where many of its members held powerful positions such as Sheriff of Denbighshire and Custos Rotulorum. This series of titles and offices can likely be traced back to Sir Thomas Salusbury of Lleweni who was appointed Steward of the Lordship of Denbigh.

During the reign of Queen Elizabeth I, the young Thomas Salusbury was put in the care of the Earl of Leicester who was already unfavoured by the people of Denbighshire as the Lord of Denbigh. This alliance with the Earl of Leicester as well as a growing conservative sentiment in Denbighshire at the time led to an Anti-Lleweni faction which remained active for the remainder of the century.

The family was met with disgrace when Thomas Salusbury was found to be complicit in the Babington Plot, furthermore much of Lleweni had been leased out to the Crown and the family had found themselves facing ruinous fines and debts, all the while the Anti-Lleweni faction had managed to keep the Lleweni Salusburys out of office in favour of the Salusburys of Rug and Bachymbyd.

Thomas’ brother and successor to the estate upon his execution, John Salusbury, managed to somewhat restore the reputation of the family after successfully defeating his cousin Captain Owen Salusbury of Holt in a duel after the latter was placed under suspicion for recent illegal activities as a mercenary. The 5th Earl of Derby called the triumph an ‘advancement of [his] credit’. John would then go on to take part in suppressing the Essex Revolt of 1601 and would be knighted for his services. Sir John was also a respected poet and patron of the arts. A contemporary of Shakespeare, he worked alongside him and Robert Chester.

While Sir John eventually defeated the Anti-Lleweni faction and became Knight for Denbighshire, he fell into severe financial ruin and ultimately had to borrow heavily on his lands from his former political opponent, Sir Thomas Myddleton. He eventually settled his financial obligations to Sir Thomas by arranging a marriage between his heir, Henry Salusbury, and Myddleton's daughter.

Henry Salusbury, Sir John's heir, was a distinguished loyalist during the time of Charles I. He received a baronetcy in 1619. Henry and his descendants appear to have found financial stability and Lleweni prospered under them.

== Post-Georgian era ==
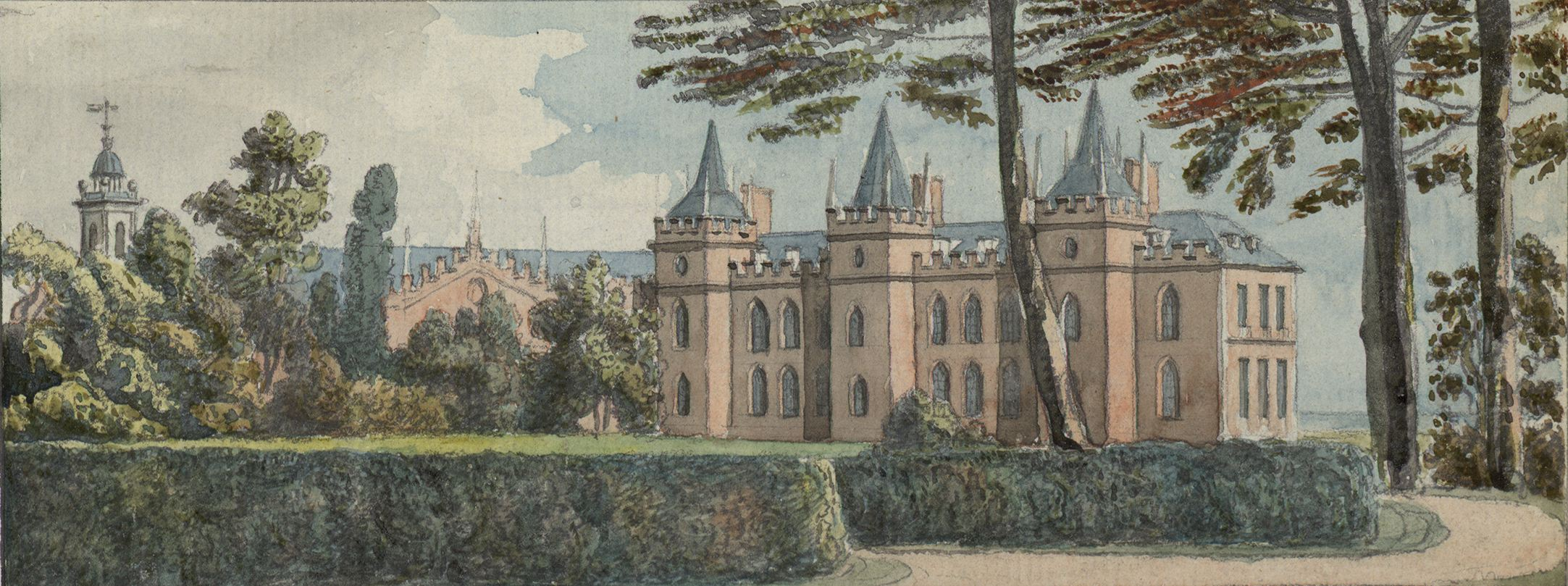
Lleweni Hall c.1775

In 1762, upon the death of Sir John Salusbury, the family had a lack of male heirs and the estate passed on to his sister, Hester Salusbury, who married Sir Robert Cotton. The many other branches of the family met the same fate, with much of their estates passing on to heiresses who married into other families who took or double-barrelled the name Salusbury to boost their prestige.

John Williams concludes his chapter on the Salusbury family as such:

“In conclusion, it may not be improper to observe that many indirect, distant, and even spurious off-shoots of this ancient and honourable stock, have, from time to time, assumed the name of Salusbury, to strengthen weak or doubtful titles; whilst many of their more direct descendants have become reduced to indigency or poverty.”

== Prominent Salusburys ==
=== Salusburys of Lleweni ===
- John Salusbury (MP) (1520–1578)
- William Salusbury (1520–1584)
- Sir Thomas Salisbury (1564–1586)
- Sir Henry Salusbury, 1st Baronet (1589–1632)
- Sir Thomas Salusbury, 2nd Baronet (1612–1643)
- Sir Thomas Salusbury, 3rd Baronet (1634–1658)
- Sir John Salusbury, 4th Baronet (died 1684)
- Sir John Salusbury Piozzi Salusbury (1793–1858)

=== Salusburys of Bachygraig ===
- Sir John Salusbury (1707–1762)
- Hester Piozzi (1741–1821)
- Rosamund Victoria Salusbury (1885–1950)

=== Salusbury of Rug ===
- John Salusbury (died 1540s) (MP)
- John Salesbury (MP)
- Robert Salesbury (MP)

=== By marriage ===
- Sir Richard Clough (1530–1570)
- Katheryn of Berain (1534–1591)
- Robert Carey, 1st Earl of Monmouth (1560–1639)
- Sir Hugh Myddleton (1560–1631)
- Sir Jonathan Trelawny, 3rd Baronet (1650–1721)
- Sir Robert Salusbury Cotton, 3rd Baronet (1695–1748)
- Charles Ingoldsby Paulet, 13th Marquess of Winchester (1764–1843)
- Stapleton Stapleton-Cotton, 1st Viscount Combermere (1773–1865)

== See also ==
- The Phoenix and the Turtle
- Lleweni Hall
- Salusbury baronets
- Brondesbury Park
