= Lleweni Hall =

Former hall in Denbighshire, Wales

Coordinates: 53.2057°N 3.3759°W

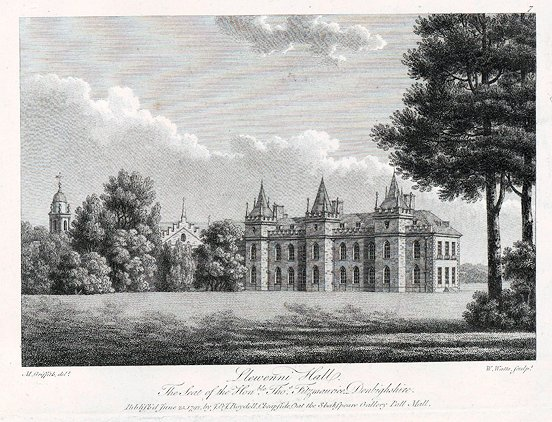
Watts, William, 1752–1851, engraver.

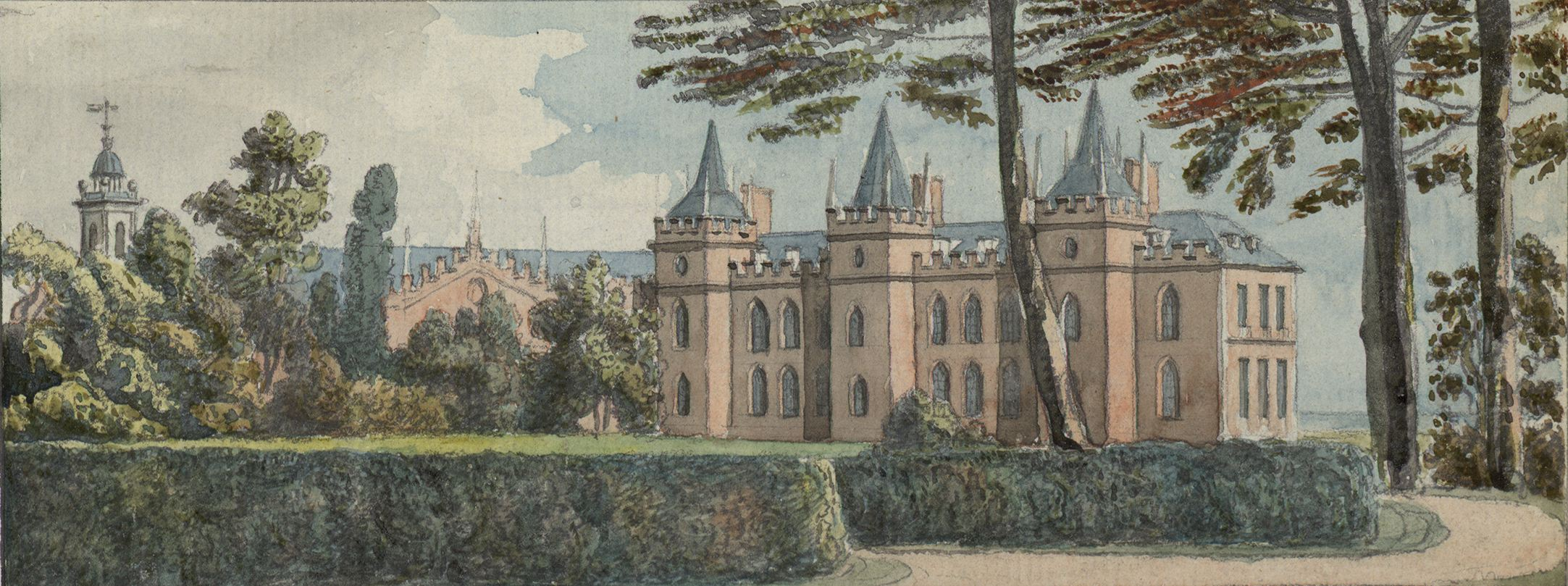
Lleweni Hall, published c.1775

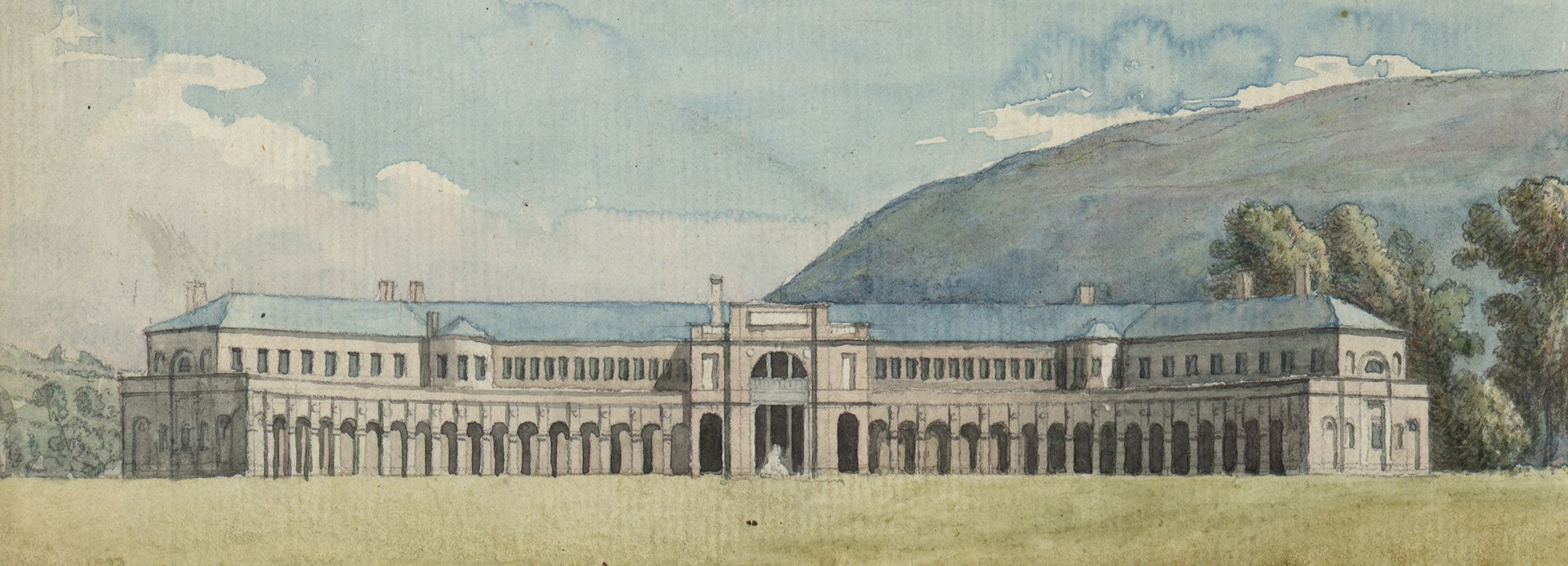
The bleach works at Lleweni

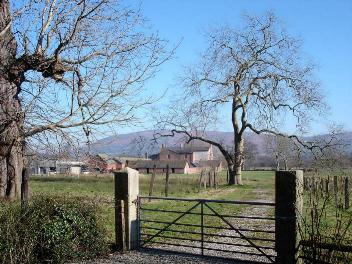
Remains in 2006. It is now used as a farmhouse.

Lleweni Hall (Welsh: Plas Lleweni; sometimes also referred to as Llewenny Palace) was a stately home in Denbighshire, northeast Wales, around 2 miles (3.2 km) north-east of Denbigh on the banks of the River Clwyd. It was the principal seat of the Salusbury family and their descendants from 1289 until 1748, and the present territorial designation of the most senior branch of the family.

== History ==
Lleweni was originally called Llysmarchweithian ("Marchweithian Court") and belonged to Marchweithian, Lord of Is Aled, a Welsh chieftain reputedly one of the founders of the Fifteen Tribes of Wales. It fell into the hands of the Salusbury family soon after the Norman Conquest when it was reputedly awarded to Adam de Salusbury for his service to William the Conqueror. Although there had been some sort of residence on the site since 720, the family was present in the Vale of Clwyd from at least 1289 and definitely established at Lleweni Hall by 1334. The present remaining structures of Lleweni Hall were first erected under the direction of Sir John Salusbury who had been granted a position at the court of Queen Elizabeth I in 1578.

Lleweni evolved into a leading seat of Welsh culture during the life of Sir John Salusbury, who established a court at Lleweni in the mid to late 16th century. He was Controller of North Wales under Henry VIII, and died in 1578. The house was huge, with three wings and dozens of windows. His grandson inscribed a list of festive songs in a book of Welsh poetry in the 1590s. The Salusburys were closely associated with Robert Dudley, Earl of Leicester. Sir John Salusbury was the grandfather of the John Salusbury who was Catrin of Berain's second son. In 1586 he married Ursula, illegitimate daughter of the Earl of Derby and half-sister of Ferdinando Stanley, 5th Earl of Derby.

Lleweni Hall had over 200 rooms, according to Hester Piozzi, who spent part of her childhood on the estate. After the death of her uncle, the hall was the seat of the Cotton baronets. However the upkeep of Lleweni was ruinously expensive. Initially leased out in 1776, following the death of Sir Robert Salusbury Cotton, it was sold by his son Sir Stapleton Cotton, 6th Baronet to pay taxes and the debts of his father. Cotton later regretted selling Lleweni Hall after having regained his fortune.

Part of the 1810 notice of the sale of the estate runs as follows:

"The very extensive and valuable FREEHOLD ESTATES comprising the noble Mansion of Lleweny Hall, which contains ample accommodation for a family of the first distinction, together with a new erected and very commodious bleach works, water corn-mill, and iron forge, all well supplied with water, a public-house, and several improvable farms: the whole containing near 4000 acres of extraordinary rich meadow, pasture, arable, and wood land, in a high state of cultivation, and lying nearly in a ring fence."

The new owner, William Hughes, who had made his fortune in copper mining, tore down part of Lleweni to build Kinmel Hall, which he did not live to see completed. Kinmel Hall, which was finally built in 1871 by descendants of Hughes, closely mimics the façade of Lleweni.

St Mary's and St Michael's Church, Burleydam, Cheshire, formerly the Cotton family's private chapel, has gates and railings from the hall.

== List of owners ==
- Sir John Salusbury of Lleweni
- After the execution of Thomas Salisbury of Lleweni in 1586 for his involvement in the Babington Plot, Lleweni passed to his brother Sir John Salusbury of Lleweni (d. 1612).
- On his death Lleweni passed to his son Sir Henry Salusbury of Lleweni, 1st baronet (d. 1632), then to his son:
- Sir Thomas Salusbury, 2nd Baronet (d. 1643), then to his son:
- Sir Thomas Salusbury of Lleweni, 3rd baronet (d. 1658) and then to the 3rd baronet's brother:
- Sir John Salusbury of Lleweni, 4th and last baronet, who died without issue in 1684. Lleweni then passed to his sister:
- Hester Salusbury, daughter of Sir Thomas Salusbury, 2nd baronet and wife of Sir Robert Cotton, 1st Baronet, who died in 1712. Lleweni then passed to his son;
- Sir Thomas Cotton, 2nd Baronet, (d. 1715) and then to;
- Sir Robert Cotton, 3rd Baronet (d. 1748). He had no issue and the property passed to his brother Sir Lynch Cotton, 4th Baronet, and then to his son Sir Robert Salusbury Cotton, 5th Baronet, who sold the property;
- In 1776 Lleweni leased to the Hon. Thomas Fitzmaurice MP (1742-1793), brother of William Petty, 2nd Earl of Shelburne, Prime Minister of Great Britain for £110,000.
- Sold to William Hughes in 1810 for £280,000.

== See also ==
- Salusbury family
- Hester Piozzi
