= Myddelton family =

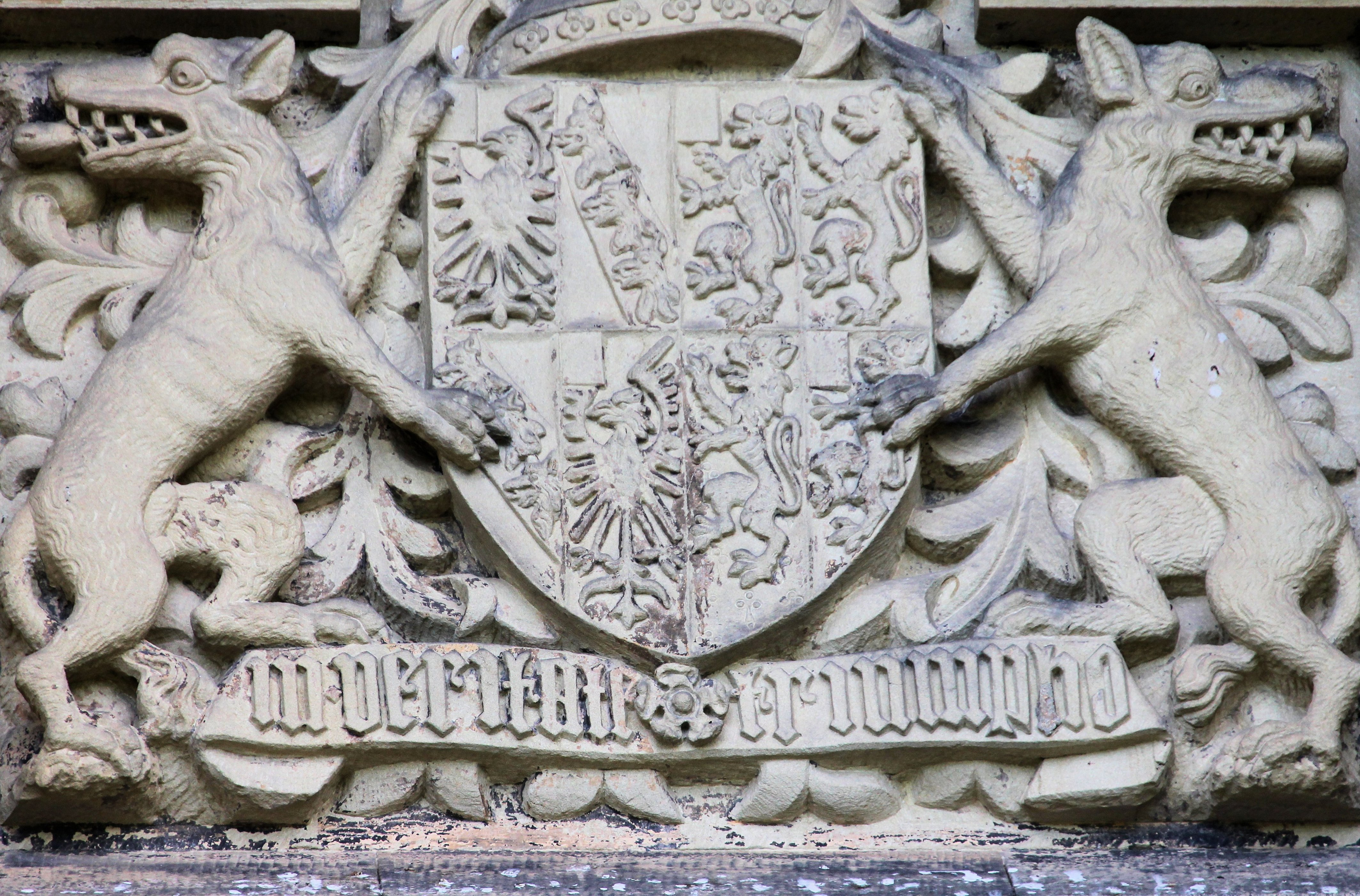
The Myddelton family coat of arms, as found on Chirk Castle

The Myddelton family were substantial landowners and benefactors in and around Denbigh in the north-east of Wales. As landowners and members of parliament, a number of its members were elevated to the baronetcy. For several generations, the family were governors of Denbigh Castle and owned Chirk Castle well into the 20th century.

== History ==
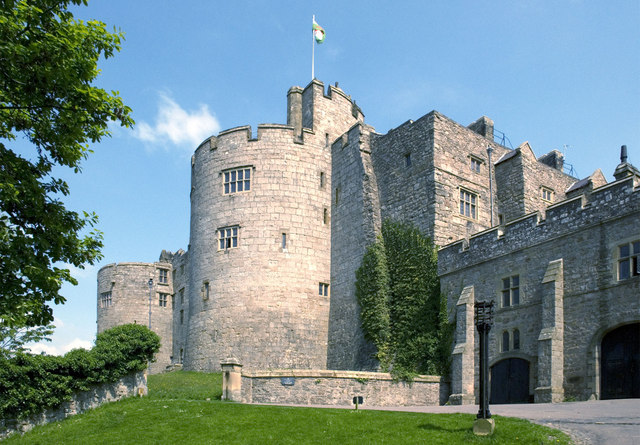
Main approach of Chirk Castle, the family seat for 400 years.

Richard Myddelton (by 1509–1577/78), the first MP for Denbigh Boroughs, was a son of Fulk Myddelton of Llansannan, himself a younger son of David Myddelton, receiver of Denbigh during the reign of King Edward IV, was for many years governor of Denbigh Castle. His younger brother was Robert Myddelton, also an MP for Denbigh Boroughs.

The Myddelton Family coat of arms features their motto, "In veritate triumpho" (I triumph in trouth), and can be found over the entrance to Chirk Castle in North Wales, which had been bought by Sir Thomas Myddelton in 1595 for £5,000. After 400 years of family ownership, the Castle was transferred to the National Trust in 1981, although family members lived at the Castle until 2004.

== Notable members ==
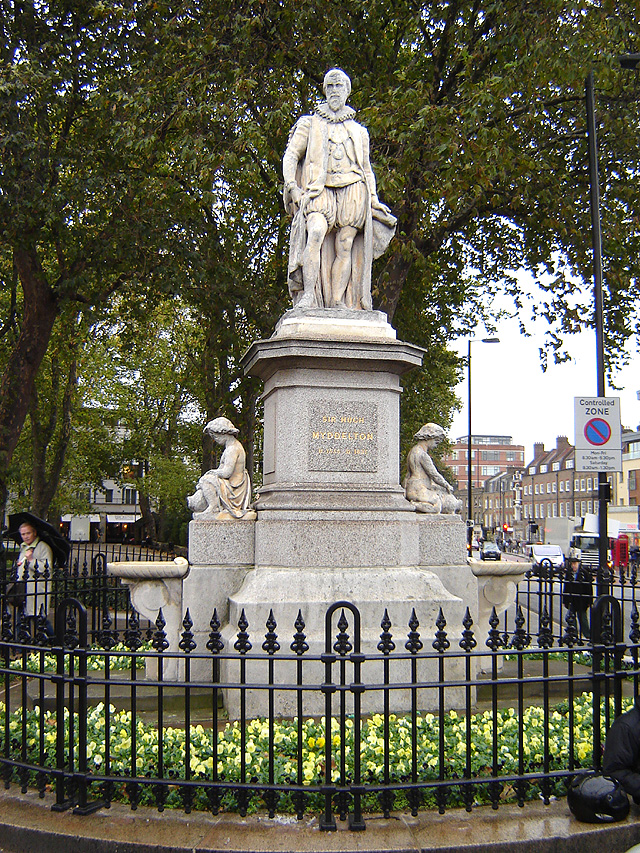
Statue of Sir Hugh Myddelton surmounting fountain, Islington Green, Islington, London, 2005

- Richard Myddelton (by 1509–1577/78), Governor of Denbigh and MP for Denbigh Boroughs.
- Robert Myddelton (by 1526–1566/67), MP for Denbigh Boroughs.
- Sir Thomas Myddelton (1550–1631), Lord Mayor of London.
- Sir Hugh Myddelton, 1st Baronet (1560–1631), clothmaker, mine-owner, goldsmith, and for Denbigh Boroughs.
- Robert Myddelton (c. 1563–1616), MP for Weymouth and Melcombe Regis and the City of London.
- Thomas Myddelton (1586–1666), MP for Denbighshire and Weymouth.
- Peter Middleton (1603–1661), MP for Weymouth.
- Sir Thomas Myddelton, 1st Baronet (1624–1663), MP
- Sir Thomas Myddelton, 2nd Baronet (1651–1684), MP
- Sir Richard Myddelton, 3rd Baronet (1655–1716), MP
- Robert Myddelton (1678–1733), MP for Denbigh Boroughs
- John Myddelton (1685–1747), MP for Denbigh Boroughs and Denbighshire
- Richard Myddelton (1726–1795), MP for Denbigh Boroughs
- Robert Myddelton Biddulph (1761–1814), MP for Denbigh Boroughs and Herefordshire
- Richard Myddelton (1764–1796), MP for Denbigh Boroughs
- Robert Myddelton Biddulph (1805–1872), MP for Denbigh Boroughs and Denbighshire
- Thomas Myddelton Biddulph (1809–1878), officer in the British Army and courtier
- Ririd Myddelton (1902–1988), country gentleman and one-time member of the Royal Household of the Sovereign of the United Kingdom

== Gallery ==
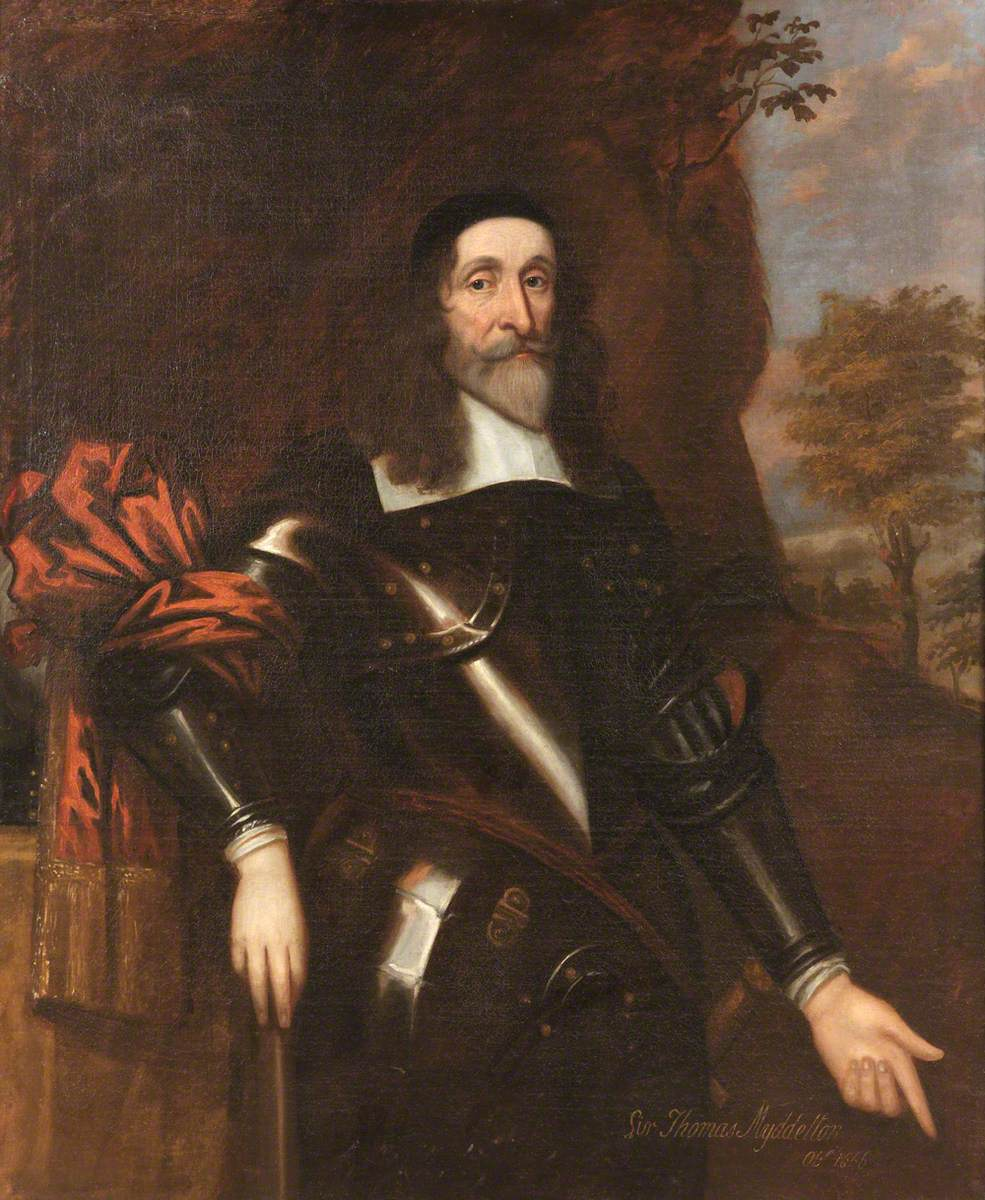
Sir Thomas Myddelton, MP for Denbighshire and Weymouth.

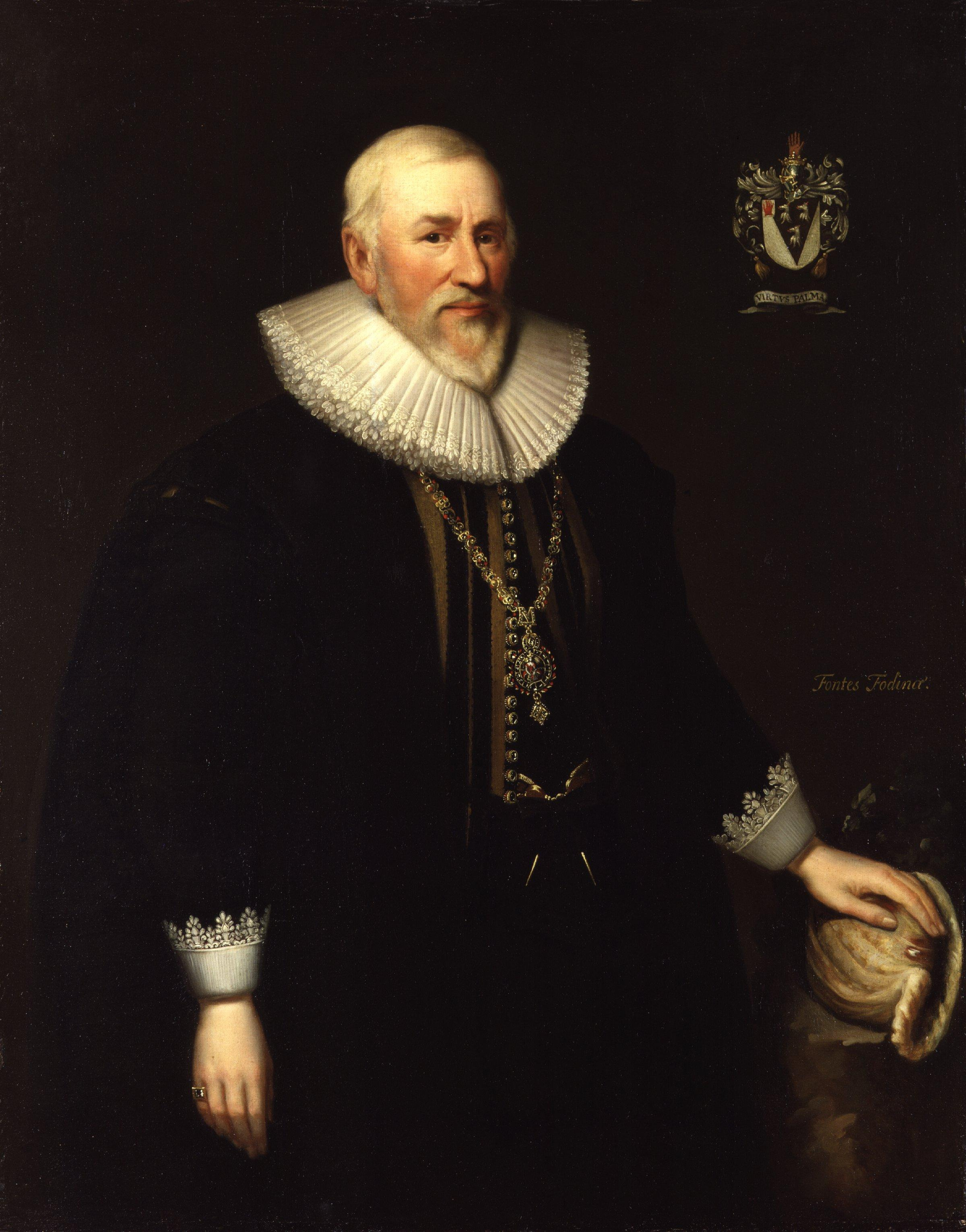
Sir Hugh Myddelton, 1st Baronet

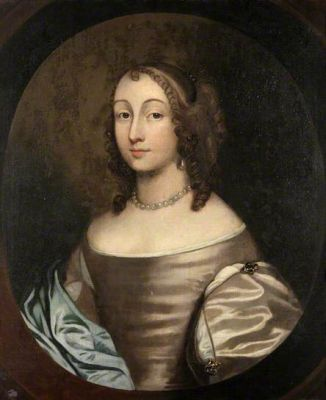
Mary (née Cholmondeley) Myddelton, first wife of Sir Thomas Myddelton, 1st Baronet

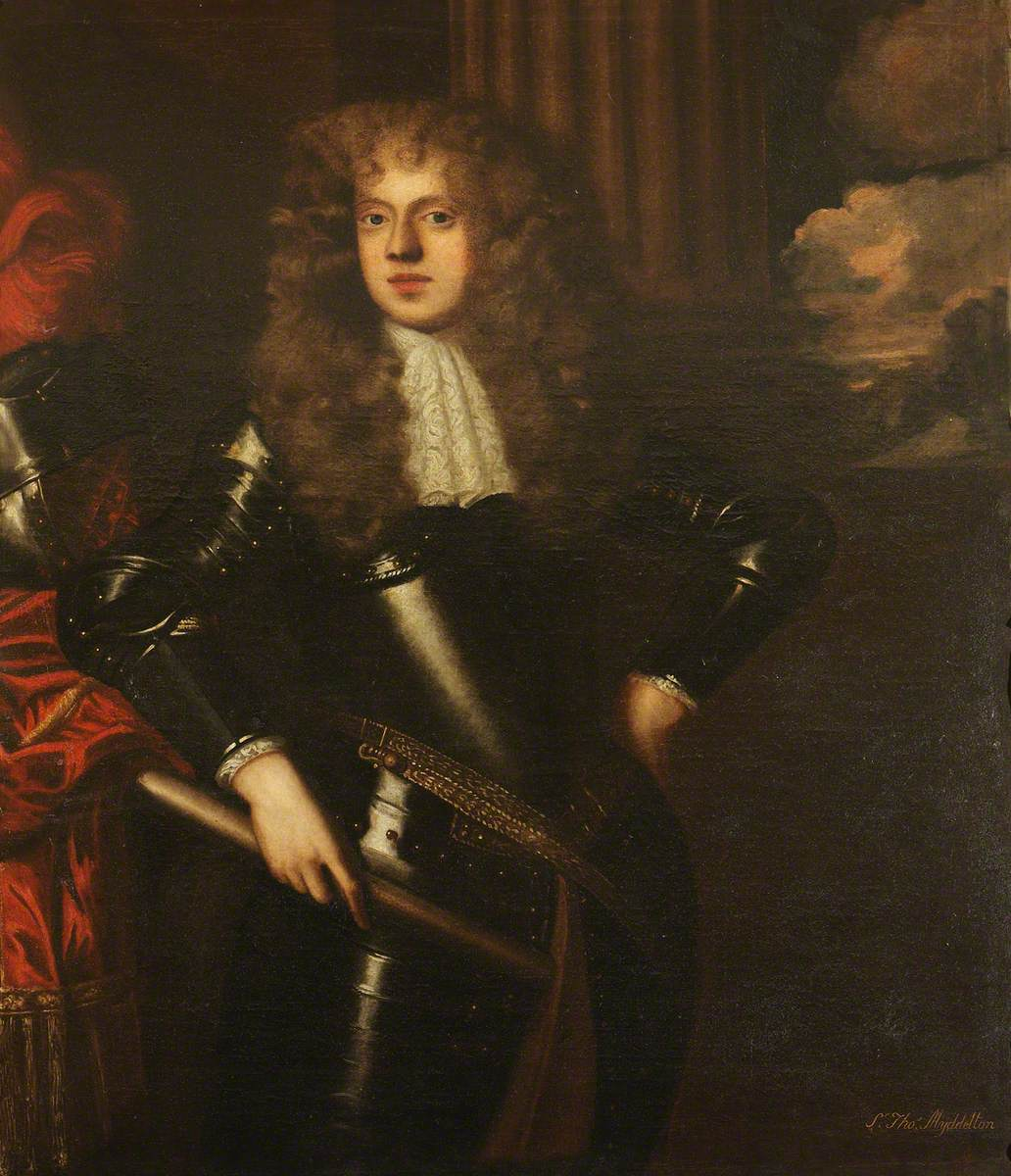
Sir Thomas Myddelton, 2nd Baronet

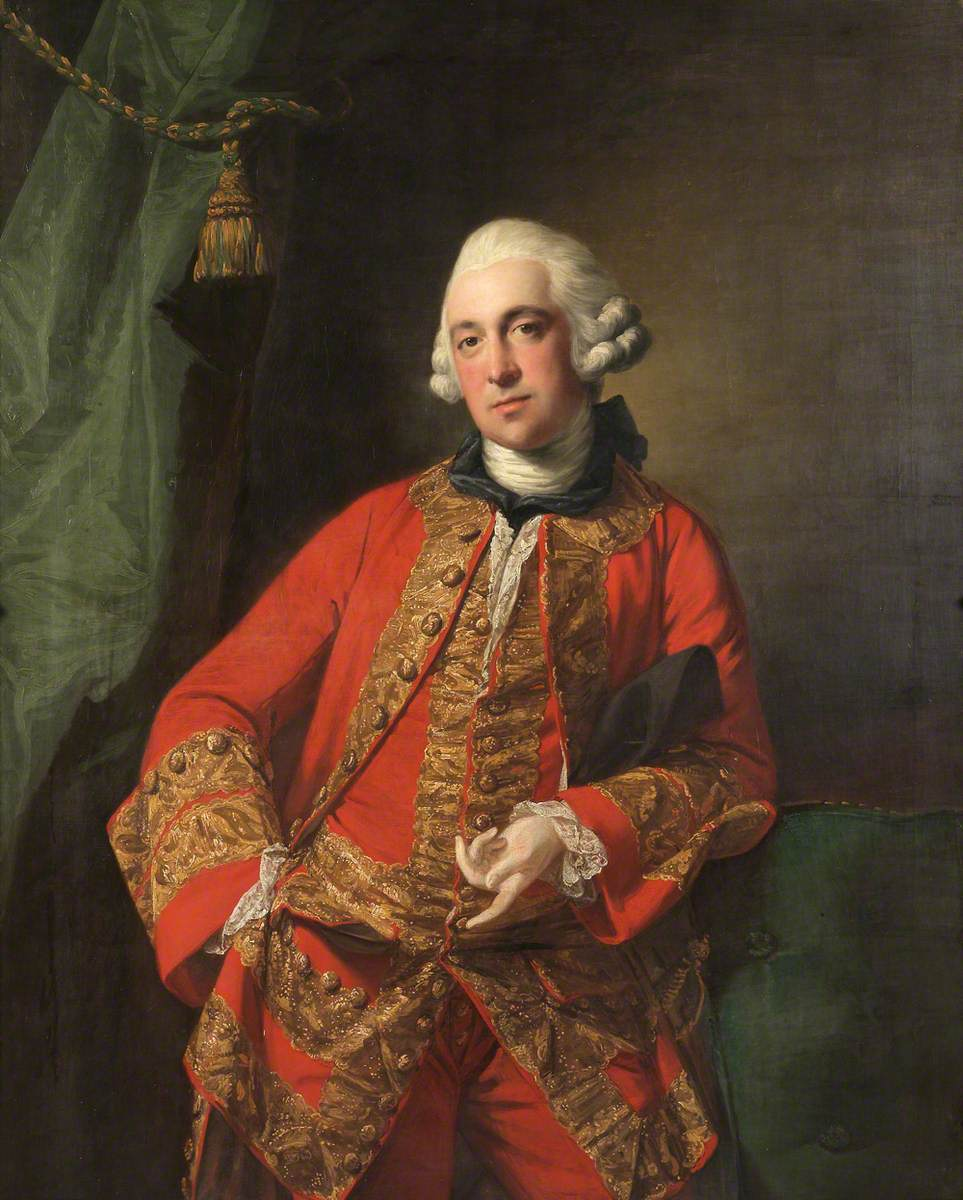
Richard Myddelton, MP for Denbigh Boroughs

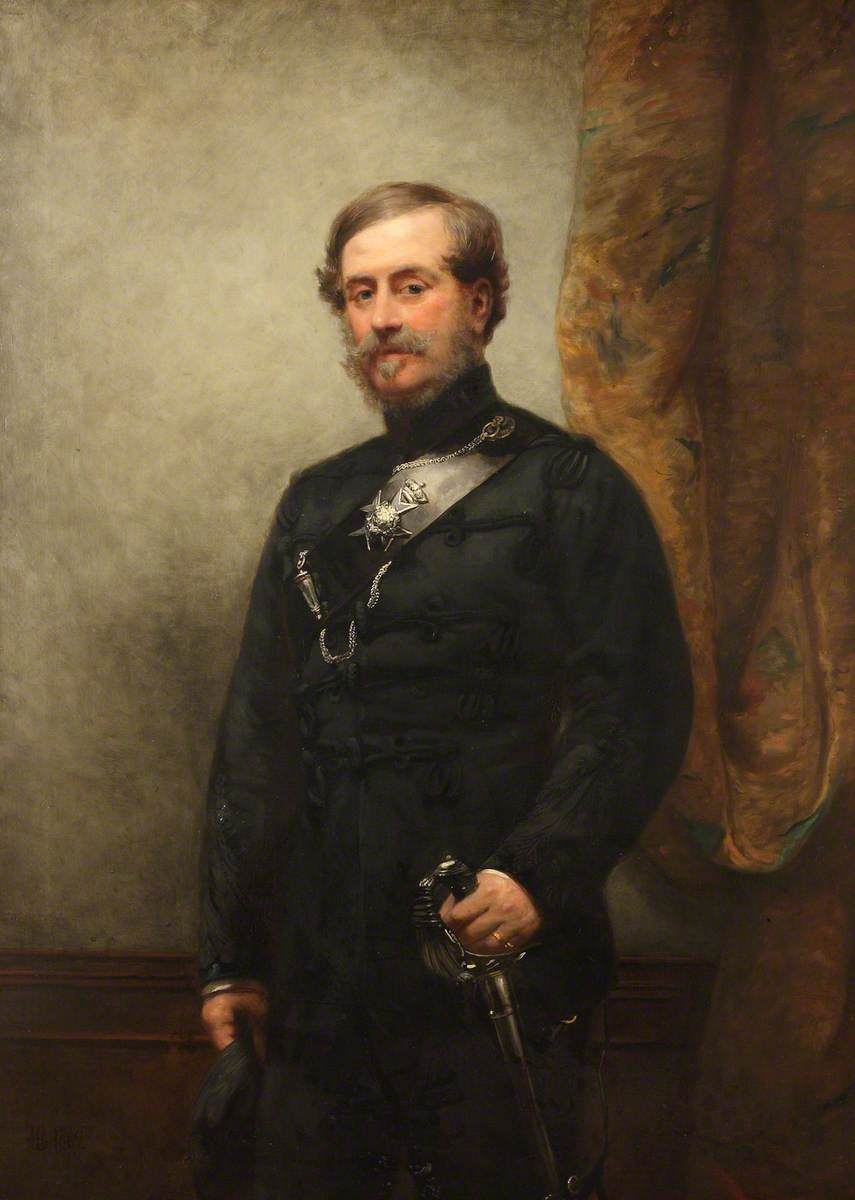
Col. Robert Myddleton Biddulph, MP for Denbigh Boroughs and Denbighshire

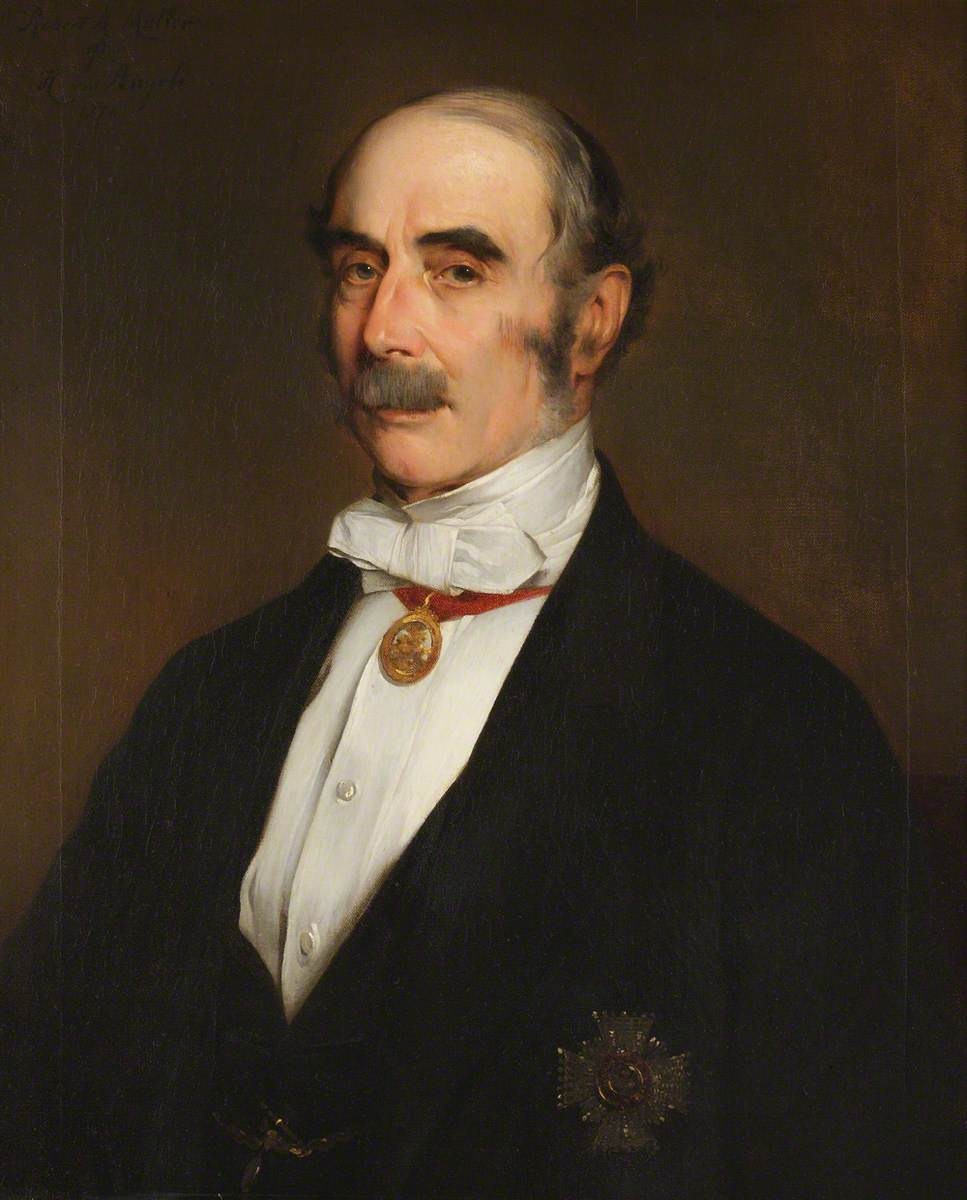
Lt.-Gen. Sir Thomas Myddelton Biddulph

== See also ==
- Myddelton College
- Myddelton baronets, of Chirke in the County of Denbigh (1660)
- Middleton baronets, of Ruthin, Denbighshire (1622)
- Saltonstall family
