= Richard Myddelton (died 1577 or 1578) =

Welsh politician

Member of Parliament for Denbigh Boroughs
- In office 16 January 1542 – 28 March 1544
- Preceded by: Inaugural holder
- Succeeded by: George Salusbury

Personal details
- Born: By 1509
- Died: 1577/78
- Spouse: Jane Dryhurst
- Relations: Robert Myddelton (brother); Thomas Myddelton (grandson); Peter Middleton (grandson); Robert Smith (uncle)
- Children: 16, including Thomas, Hugh, Robert
- Parent(s): Margaret Smith; Fulk Myddelton
- Relatives: Myddelton family

Richard Myddelton (by 1509 – 1577/78), of Galch Hill, near Denbigh, was a Welsh politician.

== Early life ==
Myddelton was born by 1509 and was the third son of Margaret (née Smith) Myddelton and Fulk Myddelton of Llansannan, a younger son of David Myddelton, receiver of Denbigh during the reign of King Edward IV, was for many years governor of Denbigh Castle. His younger brother was Robert Myddelton, also an MP for Denbigh Boroughs.

His mother was a daughter of Thomas Smith of Chester and sister to Robert Smith, MP for Carlisle.

== Career ==
Upon his father's death before March 1534, Myddelton may have succeeded him as governor of Denbigh Castle, an office which was later held by his own sons.

He was a Member (MP) of the Parliament of England for Denbigh Boroughs in 1542.

== Personal life ==
Myddelton was married Jane Dryhurst, a daughter of Hugh Dryhurst of Denbigh. Together, they were the parents of nine sons and seven daughters, including:

- Sir Thomas Myddelton (1550–1631), a Lord Mayor of London who married four times.
- William Myddelton (1556–1621), a poet and seaman who died at Antwerp in 1621.
- Sir Hugh Myddelton, 1st Baronet (1560–1631), a merchant and clothmaker who was appointed Royal Jeweller by King James VI and I.
- Robert Myddelton (c. 1563–1616), MP for Weymouth and Melcombe Regis and the City of London.

Myddelton died in 1577 or 1578.

=== Descendants ===
Through his son Thomas, he was a grandfather of Sir Thomas Myddelton (1586–1666), who represented Weymouth in the Commons from 1624 to 1625 and Denbighshire from 1625 to 1661.

Through his son Robert, he was a grandfather of Peter Middleton (1603–1661), who represented Weymouth in the Commons in 1659 and 1660.

Parliament of England
Preceded by Inaugural holder	Member of Parliament for Denbigh Boroughs; 1542–1544	Succeeded by George Salusbury
