= Thomas Myddelton =

Thomas Myddelton may refer to:

- Thomas Myddelton (Lord Mayor of London) (1550–1631), fourth son of Richard Myddelton, Governor of Denbigh, and Jane Dryhurst
- Thomas Myddelton (younger) (1586–1666), English politician and Parliamentary general
- Sir Thomas Myddelton, 1st Baronet (1624–1663)
- Sir Thomas Myddelton, 2nd Baronet (c. 1651–1684)

== See also ==
- Thomas Middleton (disambiguation)
