= Watkin Williams-Wynn =

Watkin Williams-Wynn may refer to:

- Sir Watkin Williams-Wynn, 3rd Baronet (1692–1749), MP for Denbighshire, 1716–1749
- Sir Watkin Williams-Wynn, 4th Baronet (1749–1789), MP for Shropshire, 1772–1774, and Denbighshire, 1774–1789, and Lord Lieutenant of Merioneth, 1775–1789, son of the above
- Sir Watkin Williams-Wynn, 5th Baronet (1772–1840), MP for Beaumaris, 1794–1796, and Denbighshire, 1796–1840, and Lord Lieutenant of Merioneth 1793–1830, son of the above
- Sir Watkin Williams-Wynn, 6th Baronet (1820–1885), MP for Denbighshire, 1841–1885, son of the above
- Sir Watkin Williams-Wynn, 7th Baronet (1860–1944), MP for Denbighshire, 1885, nephew of the above
- Sir Watkin Williams-Wynn, 8th Baronet (1891–1949), son of the above
- Sir Watkin Williams-Wynn, 9th Baronet (1862–1951), British Army officer and Lord Lieutenant of Denbighshire, 1928–1951, grandson of the 5th Baronet
- Sir Watkin Williams-Wynn, 10th Baronet (1904–1988), British Army officer and Lord Lieutenant of Denbighshire, 1966–1974, son of the above
- Sir Watkin Williams-Wynn, 11th Baronet (born 1940), son of the above

== See also ==
- Watkin Williams (disambiguation)
- Charles Watkin Williams-Wynn (disambiguation)
