= Custos Rotulorum of Denbighshire =

This is a list of people who have served as Custos Rotulorum of Denbighshire.

- Sir John Salusbury — before 1544 – c. 1548
- Sir John Salusbury — before 1558 – after 1564
- Robert Dudley, 1st Earl of Leicester — before 1573 – 1588
- Sir Thomas Egerton — before 1594 – 1596
- Roger Puleston — 1596–1618
- Evan Lloyd — 1618 – after 1621
- Sir Thomas Myddelton — 1626 – after 1636
- Sir Thomas Salusbury, 2nd Baronet — 1642–1643
- William Wynne — 1643
- William Price — 1643–1646
- Interregnum
- Sir Thomas Myddelton — 1660–1666
- Edward Herbert, 3rd Baron Herbert of Chirbury — 1666–1678
- Sir Thomas Myddelton, 2nd Baronet — 1678–1684
- Sir Richard Myddelton, 3rd Baronet — 1684–1688
- William Herbert, 1st Marquess of Powis — 1688–1689
- Sir Robert Cotton, 1st Baronet — 1689
- Sir William Williams, Bt. — 1689–1690
- Sir Richard Myddelton, 3rd Baronet — 1690–1699
- Sir Robert Cotton, 1st Baronet — 1699–1702
- Sir Richard Myddelton, 3rd Baronet — 1702–1716
- Sir Robert Salusbury Cotton, 3rd Baronet — 1716–1748

For later custodes rotulorum, see Lord Lieutenant of Denbighshire.
