= Myddelton baronets =

Extinct baronetcy in the Baronetage of England

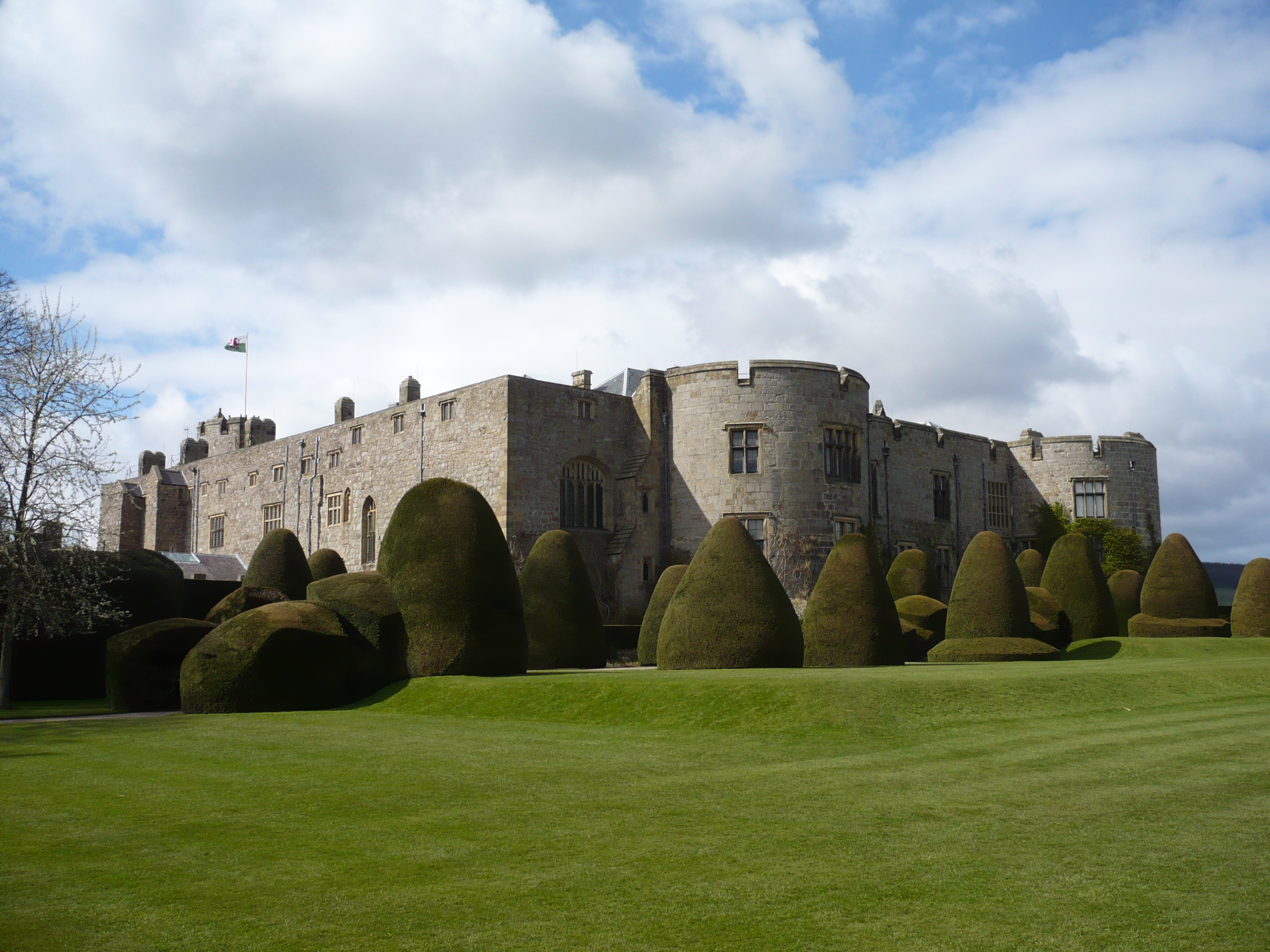
Chirk Castle – the Myddelton seat

The Myddelton Baronetcy, of Chirk in the County of Denbigh, was a title in the Baronetage of England. It was created on 4 July 1660 for Thomas Myddelton, Member of Parliament for Flint, Montgomery and Denbighshire. He was the son of the politician and Parliamentary general Sir Thomas Myddelton and the grandson of Sir Thomas Myddelton, Lord Mayor of London in 1613. The second and third Baronets represented Denbighshire in the House of Commons. The title became extinct on the death of the fourth Baronet in 1718.

== Myddelton baronets, of Chirke (1660) ==
- Sir Thomas Myddelton, 1st Baronet (1624–1663)
- Sir Thomas Myddelton, 2nd Baronet (c. 1651–1684)
- Sir Richard Myddelton, 3rd Baronet (1655–1716)
- Sir William Myddelton, 4th Baronet (1694–1718)

== See also ==
- Middleton baronets
- Myddelton family
