= Richard Myddleton =

Richard Myddleton may refer to:

- Richard Myddelton (died 1577 or 1578), MP for Denbigh Boroughs in 1542
- Sir Richard Myddelton, 3rd Baronet (1655–1716), MP for Denbighshire, 1685–1716
- Richard Myddelton (1726–1795), MP for Denbigh Boroughs, 1747–1788
- Richard Myddelton (1764–1796), MP for Denbigh Boroughs, 1788–1796

== See also ==
- Richard Middleton (disambiguation)
