= Eubule Thelwall (politician) =

Welsh lawyer, academic and politician

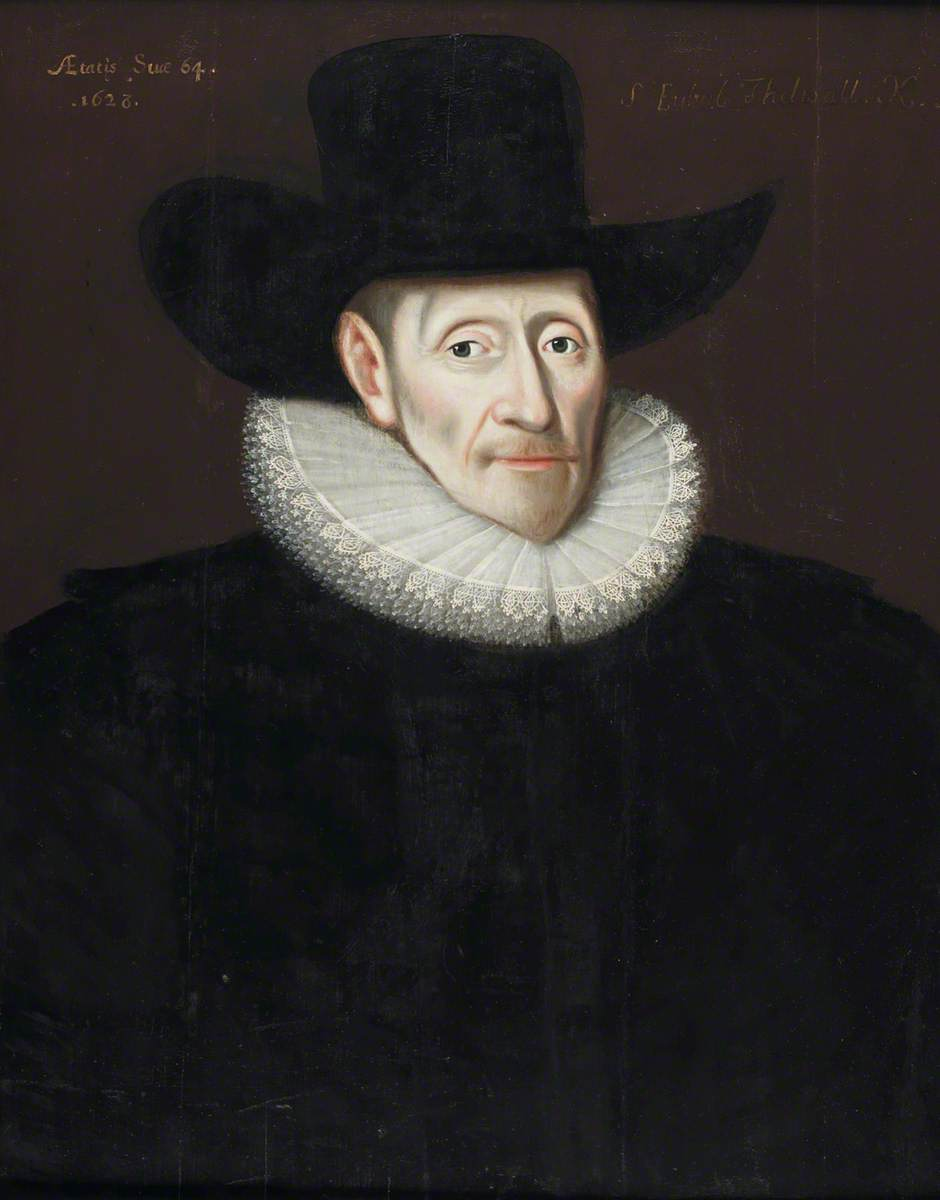
Eubule Thelwall (1562–1630)

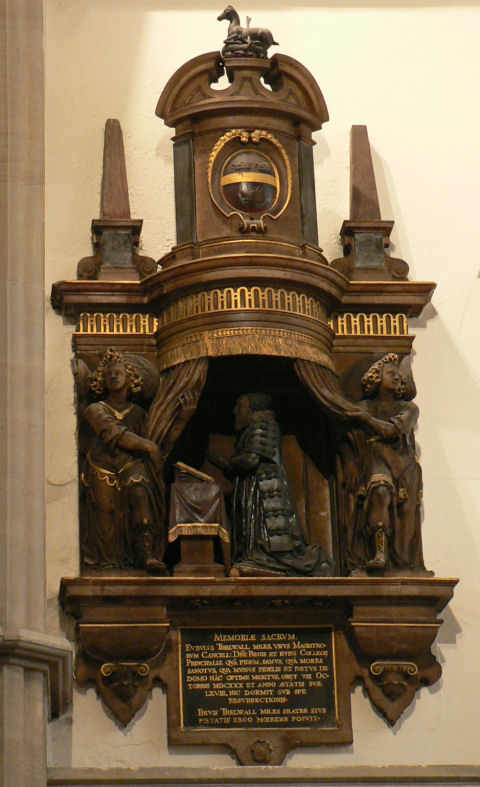
Monument to Sir Eubule Thelwall, 1630, in Jesus College Chapel, Oxford. Female figures draw back a curtain revealing a kneeling figure.

Sir Eubule Thelwall (c. 1562 – 8 October 1630) was a Welsh lawyer, academic and politician who sat in the House of Commons between 1624 and 1629. He was principal of Jesus College, Oxford, from 1621 to 1630.

== Life ==
Thelwall was the fifth son of John Wynne Thelwall. He was educated at Westminster School and was a scholar at Trinity College, Cambridge, where he received his BA in 1577. Thelwall matriculated at the University of Oxford on 14 July 1579, and was awarded his MA on 13 June 1580. He was Chief Master of the Alienation office from 1579 to 1599 and was called to the bar in 1599. On 8 March 1605, he was appointed steward and recorder of Ruthin for life. He built the house of Plas Coch and on 28 December 1607 he received a joint grant of the office of Prothonotary and Clerk of the Crown in Anglesey, Carnarvonshire, and Merionethshire for life, in reversion after the death of Richard Fowler. He became a member of Gray's Inn on 16 June 1612. From 1617 to 1630 he was a Master in Chancery.

Thelwall became Principal of Jesus College, Oxford in 1621, and remained in this post until his death. He was knighted on 29 June 1619. In 1622, he succeeded in securing a new charter and statutes for the college from King James I, having spent £5,000 on the hall and chapel, which earned him the title of its second founder. In 1624, he was elected Member of Parliament for Denbighshire. He was treasurer of Gray's Inn in 1625. In 1626 he was elected MP for Denbighshire again. He was re-elected MP for Denbighshire in 1628 and sat until 1629 when King Charles decided to rule without parliament for eleven years.

Thelwall died on 8 October 1630, aged 68 and was buried in Jesus College Chapel where a monument was erected to his memory by his brother Sir Bevis Thelwall (Page of the King's Bedchamber and Clerk of the Great Wardrobe). Another brother Simon was also MP for Denbighshire.

Thelwall never married, and left his estate (Plas Coch in the parish of Llanychan, Denbighshire) to his nephew John. There is a picture of him as a child in Jesus College.

Parliament of England
Preceded by Sir John Trevor	Member of Parliament for Denbighshire; 1624	Succeeded by Thomas Myddelton
Preceded by Thomas Myddelton	Member of Parliament for Denbighshire; 1626–1629	Parliament suspended until 1640
