= Thomas Middleton (disambiguation) =

Thomas Middleton (1580–1627) was an English playwright.

Thomas Middleton may also refer to:

- Thomas Middleton (died 1429), MP for Southampton
- Thomas Myddelton (Lord Mayor of London) (1550–1631)
- Thomas Myddelton (younger) (1586–1666), Welsh politician, parliamentarian soldier during the English Civil War
- Thomas Middleton (Sussex) (1589–1662), English politician who sat in the House of Commons variously between 1640 and 1660
- Sir Thomas Middleton (1654–1702), MP for Harwich
- Thomas Middleton (1676–1715), MP for Essex
- Thomas Middleton (bishop) (1769–1822), Anglican bishop in India
- Thomas Cooke Middleton (1842–1923), American priest
- Sir Thomas Middleton (agriculturalist) (1863–1943), British biologist
- Thomas Percy Middleton (1893–?), British flying ace of World War I
- Thomas M. Middleton (born 1945), American politician from Maryland

== See also ==
- Thomas Middleton Raysor (1895–1974), American literary scholar
- Tom Middleton (disambiguation)
- Thomas Myddelton (disambiguation)
