= Tom Middleton (disambiguation) =

Tom Middleton (born 1971) is a British musician.

Tom Middleton may also refer to:

- Tom Middleton (Canadian singer), Canadian pop singer
- Tom Middleton (rower) (born 1976), British rower
- Tom F. Middleton (born 1945), American politician, member of the Michigan House of Representatives

== See also ==
- Thomas Middleton (disambiguation)
