= John Salusbury (died 1578) =

Welsh landowner, county officer and politician

John Salusbury (by 1520 – 1578), of Lleweni Hall, Denbighshire, was a Welsh landowner, county officer, and member of parliament.

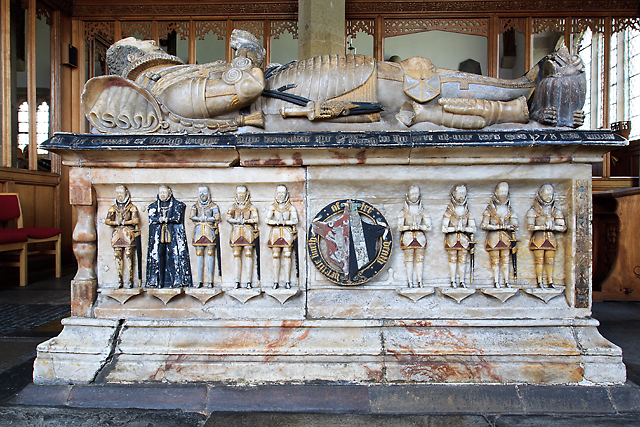
Tomb of Sir John Salisbury at St Marcella's Church, Denbigh

He was the eldest surviving son of Sir Roger Salusbury of Lleweni Hall. He succeeded his father in 1530 and was knighted on 22 February 1547.

Salusbury was appointed by King Henry VIII as Sheriff of Denbighshire for 1541–42 and as Sheriff of Flintshire for 1548–49. He served as a justice of the peace for Denbighshire from 1543 to his death and as Custos Rotulorum of Denbighshire by 1558 until 1564. He was again Sheriff of Denbighshire in 1574–75.

Salusbury was elected a member (MP) of the Parliament of England for Denbighshire in 1545, 1547, October 1553, April 1554, November 1554 and 1558.

== Personal life ==
He had married Jane, the daughter and coheiress of David Myddelton of Chester, Cheshire, and had six sons and two daughters. His eldest son and heir John predeceased him in 1566. On his death, he was buried in St Marcel's church, Denbigh. His grandson Sir Thomas Salisbury was later executed for complicity in the Babington Plot.
