= 1885 Denbighshire by-election =

UK Parliamentary by-election

The 1885 Denbighshire by-election was a parliamentary by-election held for the UK House of Commons constituency of Denbighshire in Wales on 27 May 1885.

== Vacancy ==
The by-election was caused by the death of the sitting Conservative MP, Watkin Williams-Wynn on 9 May 1885.

== Candidates ==
The only candidate who nominated was Conservative Herbert Williams-Wynn, the nephew and son in law of Watkin Williams-Wynn He was thus elected unopposed.

== Result ==
1885 Denbighshire by-election
Party	Candidate	Votes	%	±%
Conservative	Herbert Williams-Wynn	Unopposed		
Registered electors				
Conservative hold				
