= George Osborne Morgan =

Welsh lawyer and politician (1826–1897)

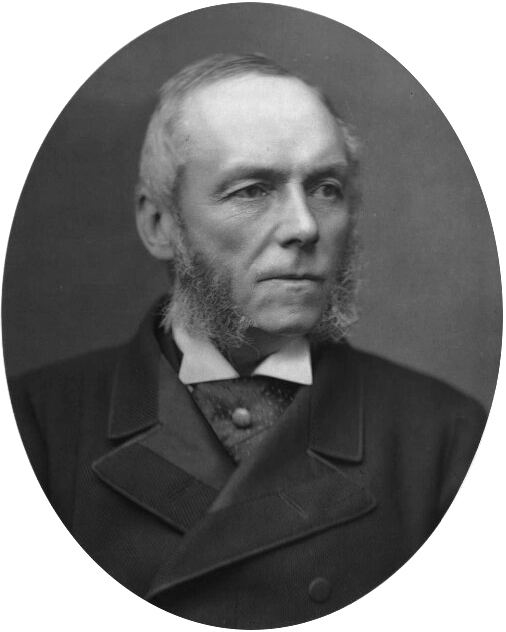
Sir George Osborne Morgan (c. 1875)

Sir George Osborne Morgan, 1st Baronet, PC, QC (8 May 1826 – 25 August 1897) was a Welsh lawyer and Liberal politician.

== Life ==
Born at Gothenburg, Sweden, Morgan was educated at Friars School, Bangor, Shrewsbury School and Balliol College, Oxford, and was a scholar of Worcester College, Oxford, from 1847.

Morgan became a barrister of Lincoln's Inn in 1853. He was Liberal MP for Denbighshire from 1868 to 1885, and for Denbighshire East from 1885 until his death. He introduced Burials Bill in 1870 re-introducing it for ten successive sessions until it was finally passed in 1880, allowing any Christian ritual in a parish cemetery, and the Places of Worship (Sites) Bill, which became law in 1873. He was appointed a Queen's Counsel and a bencher of Lincoln's Inn in 1869, serving as treasurer from 1890. He was chairman of the House of Commons Select Committee on Land Titles and Transfer from 1878–9. Among his many Welsh involvements was support for the Welsh Sunday closing bill, disestablishment of the Welsh Church, supporting the University College of Wales at Aberystwyth.

He held office as Judge Advocate General under William Gladstone from 1880 to 1885, and was appointed a privy councillor in 1880. He introduced successfully the annual Army Discipline Bill in 1881, and took charge of Married Women's Property Bill, 1882. He was re-elected as Member of Parliament for East Denbighshire in 1885, 1886, and 1892, defeating Sir Watkin Williams-Wynn, whose family had represented Denbighshire in Parliament for 177 years.

He once again held office under Gladstone as Under-Secretary of State for the Colonies in 1886.

Morgan was created a baronet, of Green Street, Grosvenor Square, in the Parish of Saint George, Hanover Square, in the County of London and of Lincoln's Inn, on 13 October 1892. The baronetcy became extinct on his death, since he had no children by his wife Emily (née Reiss).

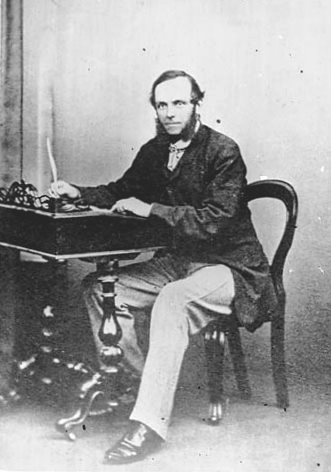
Photograph by John Thomas

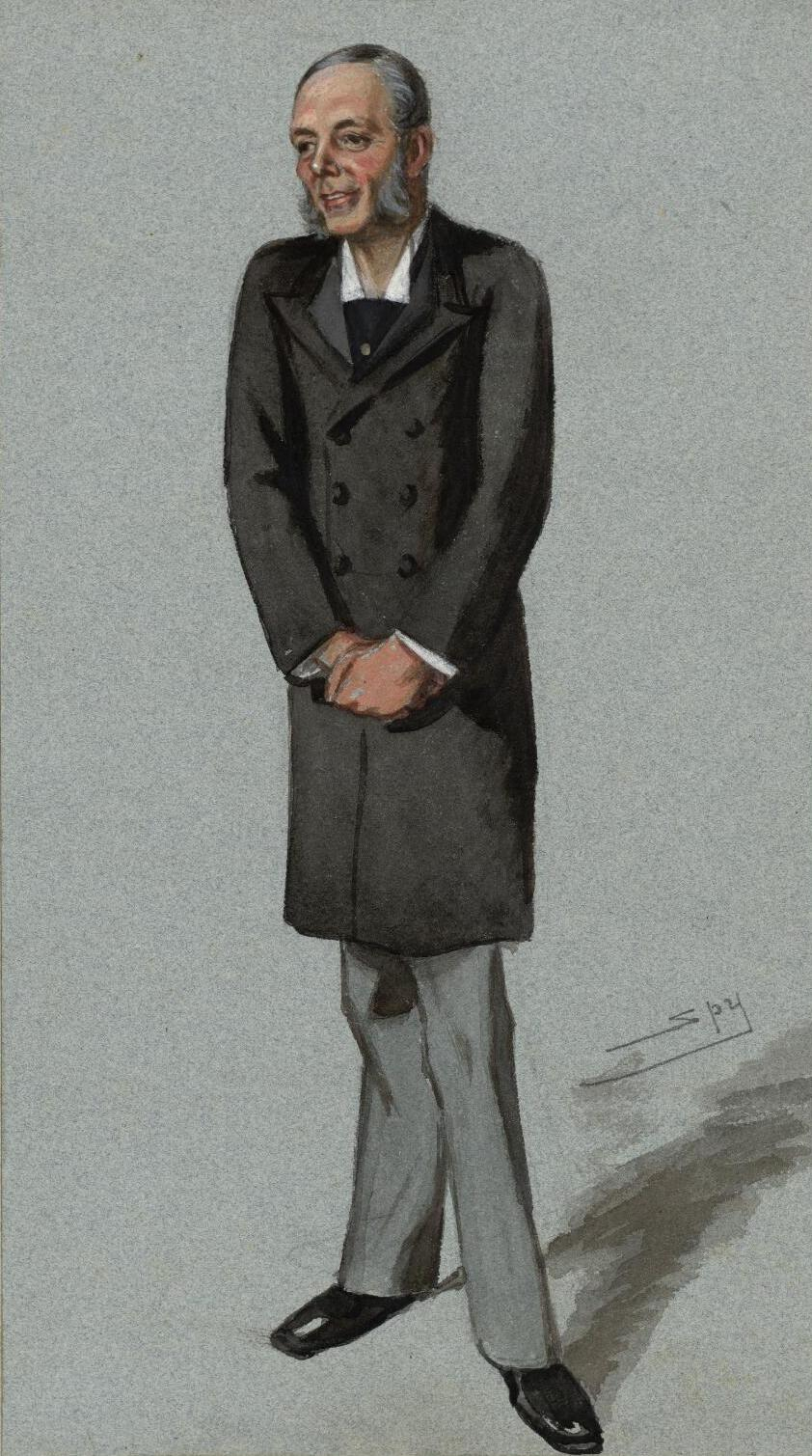
Caricature by Leslie Ward (1879)

Escutcheon of the Morgan baronets of Green Street and Lincoln's Inn

== Works ==
Morgan published a translation of Virgil's Eclogues in English hexameters, and other writings.

Parliament of the United Kingdom
Preceded by Sir Watkin Williams-Wynn, Bt; Robert Myddleton-Biddulph	Member of Parliament for Denbighshire; 1868–1885; With: Sir Watkin Williams-Wynn, Bt, to May 1885; Sir Herbert Williams-Wynn, Bt, from May 1885	Constituency abolished
New constituency	Member of Parliament for East Denbighshire; 1885–1897	Succeeded by Samuel Moss
Political offices
Preceded by George Cavendish-Bentinck	Judge Advocate General; 1880–1885	Succeeded by William Thackeray Marriott
Preceded by The Earl of Dunraven and Mount-Earl	Under-Secretary of State for the Colonies; February–July 1886	Succeeded by The Earl of Dunraven and Mount-Earl
Baronetage of the United Kingdom
New creation	Baronet (of Green Street and Lincoln's Inn); 1892–1897	Extinct
Preceded by Levy-Lawson baronets	Morgan baronets of Green Street and Lincoln's Inn; 13 October 1892	Succeeded by Armstrong baronets
