= Simon Thelwall (MP died 1663) =

Welsh politician

Simon Thelwall (by 1580 – 1663) was a Welsh member of parliament.

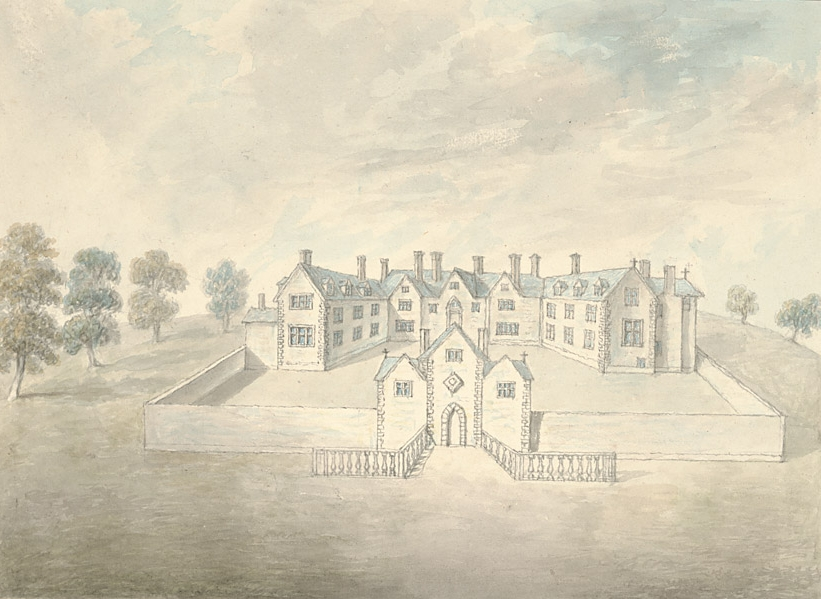
Llwydiarth, 1794

He was the eldest son of Edward Thelwall of Plas-y-Ward, Llanynys, Denbighshire. He succeeded his father in 1610, inheriting the recently purchased Branas estate.

He was a justice of the peace for Merioneth from 1610 to 1642 and for Denbighshire from 1613 to c.1646 and from 1648 to his death. He was appointed High Sheriff of Denbighshire for 1611–12. He served as a deputy lieutenant of Denbighshire from 1660, probably until his death. He was elected MP for Denbighshire in 1614.

He married twice: firstly Jane, the daughter of Maurice Wynn of Gwydir, Llanrwst, Caernarvonshire, with whom he had three sons and a daughter and secondly Dorothy, the daughter of John Wyn Owen Vaughan of Llwydiarth, Montgomeryshire and the widow of Andrew Meredith of Glantanat, Llanrhaeadr-ym-Mochnant, Denbighshire, with whom he had three more sons and three more daughters.

Parliament of England
Preceded by Peter Mutton	Member of Parliament for Denbighshire; 1614	Succeeded by Sir John Trevor
