= Peter Mutton =

Welsh lawyer and politician

Sir Peter Mutton (1565 – 4 November 1637) was a Welsh lawyer and politician who sat in the House of Commons at various times between 1604 and 1624.

Mutton was the son of John Mytton, a landowner in the Vale of Clwyd. He matriculated at St Alban Hall, Oxford, on 18 October 1583, at the age of 18. He was called to the bar at Lincoln's Inn in 1594. In 1604, he was elected Member of Parliament for Denbighshire. He was granted the reversion of the office of Attorney General in Wales and Shropshire, Herefordshire, Gloucestershire, Worcestershire, Cheshire, and Flintshire for life on 26 March 1607, but resigned the position on 3 December 1614. He was appointed Attorney in the Marches and one of the council, and granted leave to practise on 23 December 1609. He was appointed Prothonotary and Clerk of the Crown in North Wales. He was Puisne Justice until 1621. From 1624 to 1637, he was Chief Justice of the Great Sessions for the counties of Anglesea, Carnarvon and Merioneth. He was knighted on 5 June 1622. Also in 1622 he was chosen a Bencher of Lincoln's Inn. In 1624 he was elected MP for Carnarvon. He was Master in Chancery from 1624 to 1637. He bought Llannerch Hall, Denbighshire.

Mutton died at the age of about 72 and was buried at Henllan.

Mutton married firstly a twelve-year-old orphan girl. He married secondly Eleanor Griffith, widow of Evan Griffith of Pengwern, Flintshire, and daughter of Edmund Williams of Conway, and sister to John Williams Archbishop of York 1641–50.

Parliament of England
Preceded by Sir John Salusbury	Member of Parliament for Denbighshire; 1604	Succeeded by Simon Thelwall
Preceded by Nicholas Griffith	Member of Parliament for Carnarvon; 1624	Succeeded by Edward Littleton
