= Richard Middleton =

Richard Middleton may refer to:

- Richard Middleton (Lord Chancellor) (died 1272), English theologian, philosopher and Lord Chancellor
- Richard Barham Middleton (1882–1911), British poet and ghost story writer
- Richard Middleton (priest) (died 1641), Anglican Dean of St David's
- Richard Middleton (musicologist), English musicologist and academic
- Richard Middleton (political agent) (1846–1905), English Conservative activist
- Rick Middleton (born 1953), ice hockey player
- Rick Middleton (American football) (born 1951), former American football player

== See also ==
- Richard Myddelton (disambiguation)
- Richard of Middleton (1249–1306), member of the Franciscan Order, theologian and philosopher
