= John Edwards (MP for Denbighshire) =

Member of the Parliament of England

John Edwards (c. 1562 – 1625), of Plas Newydd, Chirk, Denbighshire, was a Welsh politician.

He was a member (MP) of the parliament of England for Denbighshire in 1589.
