= Watkin Williams =

Watkin Williams may refer to:

- Watkin Williams (Liberal politician) (1828–1884), Welsh judge, doctor and Liberal politician
- Watkin Williams (bishop) (1845–1944), dean of St Asaph and bishop of Bangor
- Watkin Williams (Flint MP) (1742–1808), Welsh politician and administrator
- Watkin Hezekiah Williams (1844–1905), Welsh schoolmaster and poet

== See also ==
- Watkin Williams-Wynn (disambiguation)
