= Robert Smith (fl. 1545) =

Member of the Parliament of England for Carlisle

Robert Smith (fl. 1545) was an English politician.

He was a member (MP) of the parliament of England for Carlisle in 1545.
