= Sir Watkin Williams-Wynn, 7th Baronet =

Welsh politician

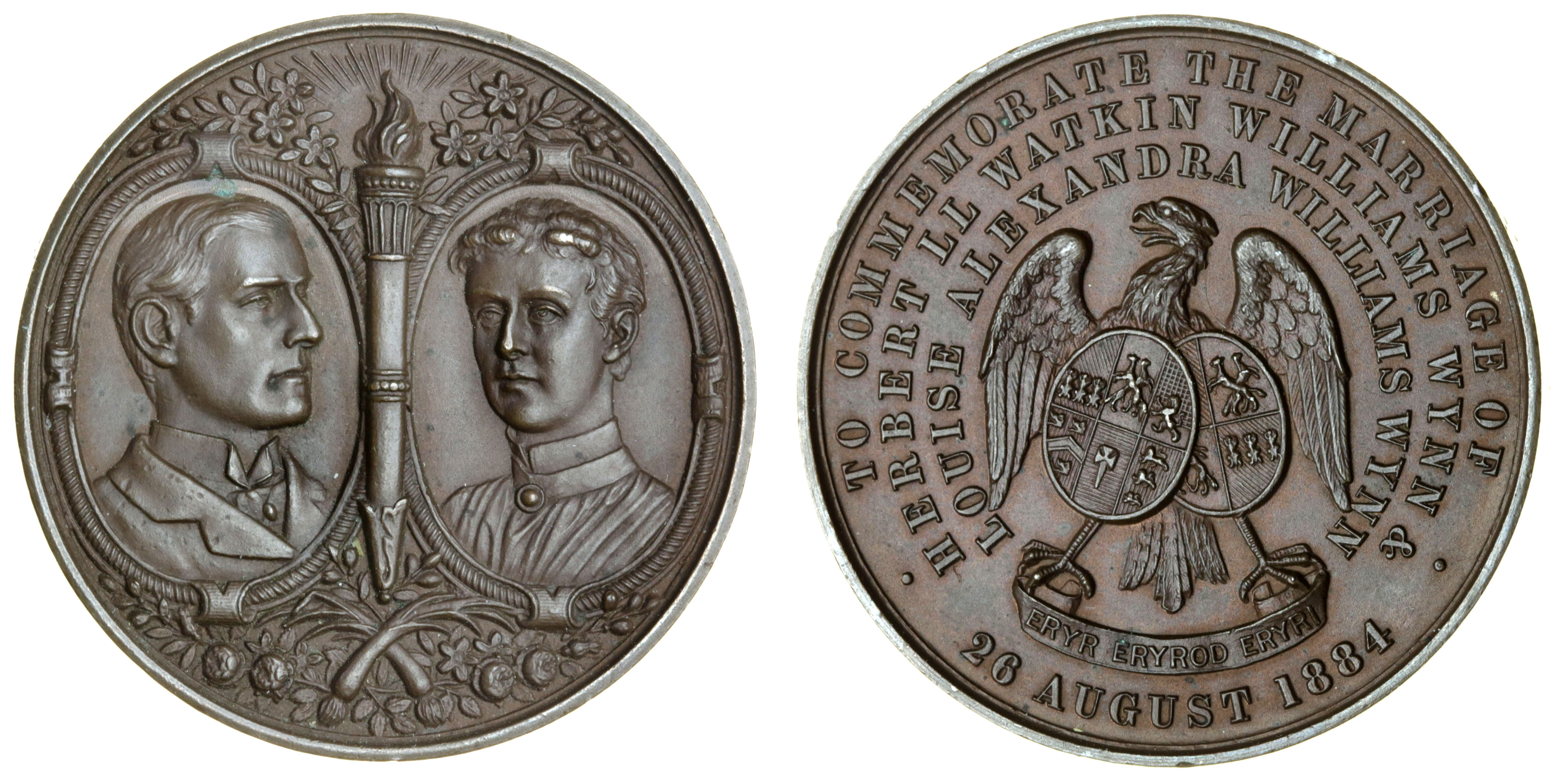
Sir Herbert Williams-Wynn and Louisa Williams-Wynn. Copper Medal struck to celebrate their wedding in 1884. Courtesy Spink and Son Ltd.

Colonel Sir Herbert Lloyd Watkin Williams-Wynn, 7th Baronet, CB (1860–1944) was a Welsh politician and Yeomanry officer.

== Early life ==
Williams-Wynn was born on 6 June 1860, the second (and eldest surviving) son of Colonel Herbert Watkin Williams-Wynn, MP, (1822–62). He succeeded to the baronetcy on the death of his uncle and father-in-law, Sir Watkin Williams-Wynn, 6th Baronet in May 1885.

== Political career ==
He was Member of Parliament (MP) for Denbighshire from May to November 1885, when the constituency was abolished. He lost the subsequent election for the new East Denbighshire constituency, and tried unsuccessfully to gain the seat in the following two elections in 1886 (when he lost by only 0.4 per cent) and 1892. He was High Sheriff of Denbighshire for 1890, and served as Lord Lieutenant of Montgomeryshire from 1891 until 1944.

== Military career ==
He was commissioned as a lieutenant in the Montgomeryshire Yeomanry (commanded by his uncle the 6th Baronet) in 1882, promoted to captain in 1884, major in 1886, and lieutenant-colonel in command of the regiment in 1889.

During the Second Boer War, he was instrumental in raising four companies of Imperial Yeomanry for service in South Africa, under the auspices of the Montgomeryshire Yeomanry. For this he was appointed Companion of the Order of the Bath (CB) in the 1902 Coronation Honours. He was granted the honorary rank of colonel in 1903.

He was appointed Honorary Colonel of the Montgomeryshire Yeomanry when he retired from the command in 1907. When the Yeomanry were incorporated into the Territorial Force in 1908 he became president of the Montgomeryshire Territorial Association and was awarded the Territorial Decoration (TD). In 1923 he transferred to be Hon Colonel of the 7th (Merionethshire and Montgomeryshire) Battalion, Royal Welch Fusiliers.

During World War I, he established a munitions factory on the Wynnstay estate.

== Family ==
On 26 August 1884 Williams-Wynn married his cousin Louise Alexandra Williams-Wynn (1864–1911), daughter of Sir Watkin Williams-Wynn, 6th Baronet and the sole heiress of the Wynnstay estate. They were divorced in 1898, having had three children:

- Gwladys Elin, born 4 September 1885, married Major Walter Kynaston, TD
- Sir Watkin Williams-Wynn, 8th Baronet, born 25 January 1891, died 9 May 1949
- Constance Mary, born 20 September 1895, married Major Guy Mostyn–Owen, 12th Lancers

He died on 24 May 1944 and was succeeded in the baronetcy by his son.

== Notes ==
Parliament of the United Kingdom
Preceded by Sir Watkin Williams-Wynn, Bt; George Osborne Morgan	Member of Parliament for Denbighshire; May 1885 – December 1885; With: George Osborne Morgan	Constituency abolished
Honorary titles
Preceded by The Earl of Powis	Lord Lieutenant of Montgomeryshire; 1891–1944	Succeeded by George Frederick Hamer
Baronetage of England
Preceded by Watkin Williams-Wynn	Baronet (of Gray's Inn); 1885–1944	Succeeded by Watkin Williams-Wynn
