= Sir Watkin Williams-Wynn, 6th Baronet =

Welsh politician (1820-1885)

Lt-Col Watkin Williams-Wynn 6th Baronet
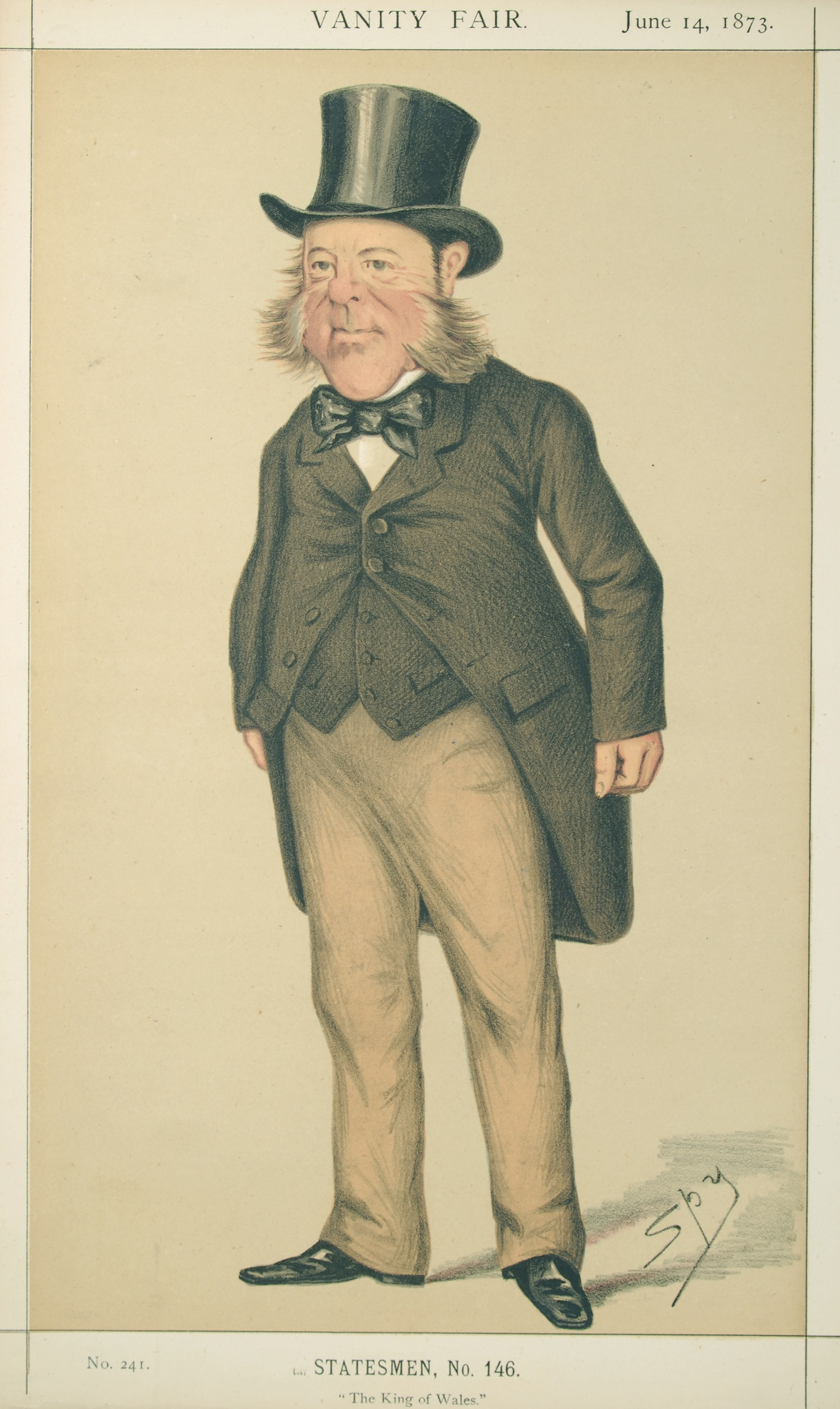
- "The King of Wales"; Williams-Wynn as caricatured by Spy (Leslie Ward) in Vanity Fair, June 1873

Member of Parliament (MP) for Denbighshire
- In office 1841–1885 Serving with William Bagot (1841-52); Robert Myddleton-Biddulph (1852–68); George Osborne Morgan (1868-85)
- Preceded by: Hugh Cholmondeley; William Bagot
- Succeeded by: George Osborne Morgan; Sir Herbert Williams-Wynn

Personal details
- Born: 22 May 1820 London, England
- Died: 9 May 1885 (aged 64)
- Party: Conservative
- Spouse: Marie Emily Williams-Wynn (m. 1852)
- Children: 2
- Parents: Sir Watkin Williams-Wynn, 5th Baronet (father); Lady Henrietta Antonia Clive (mother)
- Relatives: Edward Clive, 1st Earl of Powis (maternal grandfather); Henrietta Clive, Countess of Powis (maternal grandmother)
- Education: Westminster School
- Alma mater: Christ Church, Oxford; Magdalene College, Cambridge
- Military career
- Allegiance: United Kingdom
- Branch: British Army
- Service years: 1839-1877
- Rank: Lieutenant colonel
- Units: Montgomeryshire Yeomanry; 1st Denbighshire Rifle Volunteers

Lt-Col. Sir Watkin Williams-Wynn, 6th Baronet (22 May 1820 – 9 May 1885) was a Welsh Conservative Party politician who sat in the House of Commons from 1841 to 1885.

== Biography ==
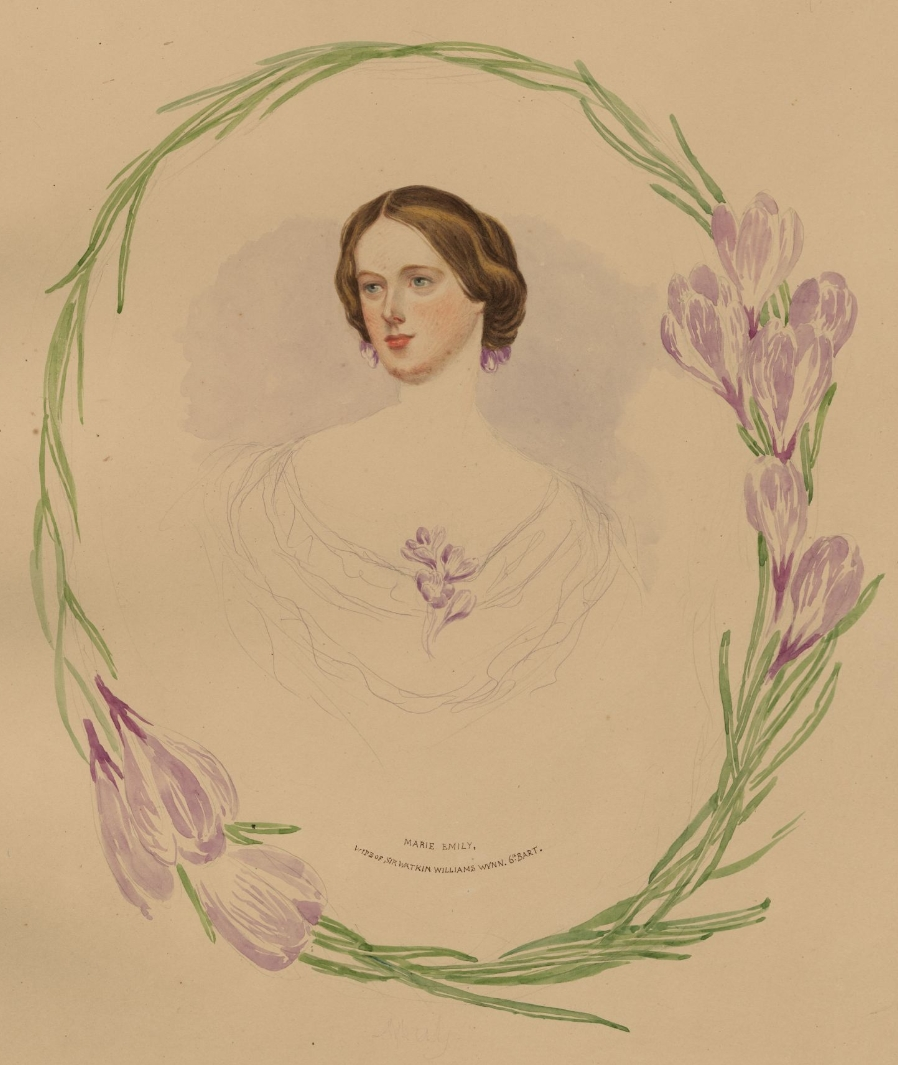
Marie Emily, wife of Watkins Williams Wynn

Williams-Wynn was born at the family's London property, the eldest son of Sir Watkin Williams-Wynn, 5th Baronet, and his wife Lady Henrietta Antonia Clive, eldest daughter of Edward Clive, 1st Earl of Powis. His brother-in-law, Edward Herbert, 2nd Earl of Powis, inherited Powis Castle in Wales. He was educated at Westminster School and Christ Church, Oxford. He was a cornet in the 1st Life Guards in 1839 and a lieutenant in 1842. He succeeded his father to the baronetcy on 6 January 1840. He was also at Magdalene College, Cambridge and graduated MA in 1842.

Williams-Wynn was elected Member of Parliament (MP) for Denbighshire in 1841 and held the seat until his death in 1885, aged 64. The seat had previously been held by his father, grandfather and great-grandfather, all of whom were also named Watkin Williams-Wynn.

Williams-Wynn was lieutenant colonel of the Montgomeryshire Yeomanry from 1844 to 1877 and of the 1st Denbighshire Rifle Volunteers from 1862 until his death. He was ADC to Queen Victoria in 1881. He hunted four days a week, having been appointed master of the hunt at 23. He was a director of the Great Western Railway. In 1845 he served as treasurer of the Salop Infirmary in Shrewsbury.

After Wynnstay was almost totally destroyed by fire in 1858, Sir Watkin rebuilt it between 1859 and 1865 on the same site, with Benjamin Ferrey as his architect.

Williams-Wynn married his cousin, Marie Emily Williams-Wynn, youngest daughter of Sir Henry Watkin Williams-Wynn, KCB, on 28 April 1852. He had two daughters, Marie Nesta Williams Wynn (23 October 1868 – 26 January 1883) who is commemorated by a stained glass window at Ruabon parish church, and Louisa Alexandra Williams Wynn (1864–1911), the sole heiress of the Wynnstay estate, who also married her cousin, Herbert Lloyd Watkin Williams-Wynn (1860–1944), who succeeded him as the 7th baronet on his death in 1885.

== Coat of arms ==
Coat of arms of Sir Watkin Williams-Wynn, 6th Baronet
Crest An eagle displayed or. Escutcheon Quarterly, 1st and 4th, Vert three eagles displayed in fesse or (Wynn), 2nd and 3rd, Argent two foxes counter-salient Gules the dexter surmounted of the sinister (Williams). Motto Eryr Eryror Eryri (The eagle of the eagles of Snowdon)

Parliament of the United Kingdom
Preceded by Hugh Cholmondeley and William Bagot	Member of Parliament for Denbighshire; 1841–1885; With: William Bagot, to 1852; Robert Myddleton-Biddulph, 1852–1868; George Osborne Morgan, from 1868	Succeeded by George Osborne Morgan and Sir Herbert Williams-Wynn
Baronetage of England
Preceded by Watkin Williams-Wynn	Baronet (of Gray's Inn); 1840–1885	Succeeded by Herbert Williams-Wynn
