= Charles Williams-Wynn =

Charles Williams-Wynn may refer to:

- Charles Williams-Wynn (1775–1850), British politician
- Charles Williams-Wynn (1822–1896), Welsh Conservative politician

== See also ==
- Charles Wynn-Williams (1903–1979), Welsh physicist
