= John Wynne (died 1689) =

John Wynne (c. 1630 – 25 February 1689), of Melai, Denbighshire, was a Welsh politician.

He was a member (MP) of the parliament of England for Denbighshire in 1664.

Parliament of England
Preceded by Sir Thomas Myddelton, 1st Bt	Member of Parliament for Denbighshire; 1664–1679	Succeeded by Sir Thomas Myddelton, 2nd Bt
