= Sir Richard Myddelton, 3rd Baronet =

Welsh landowner (1655–1716)

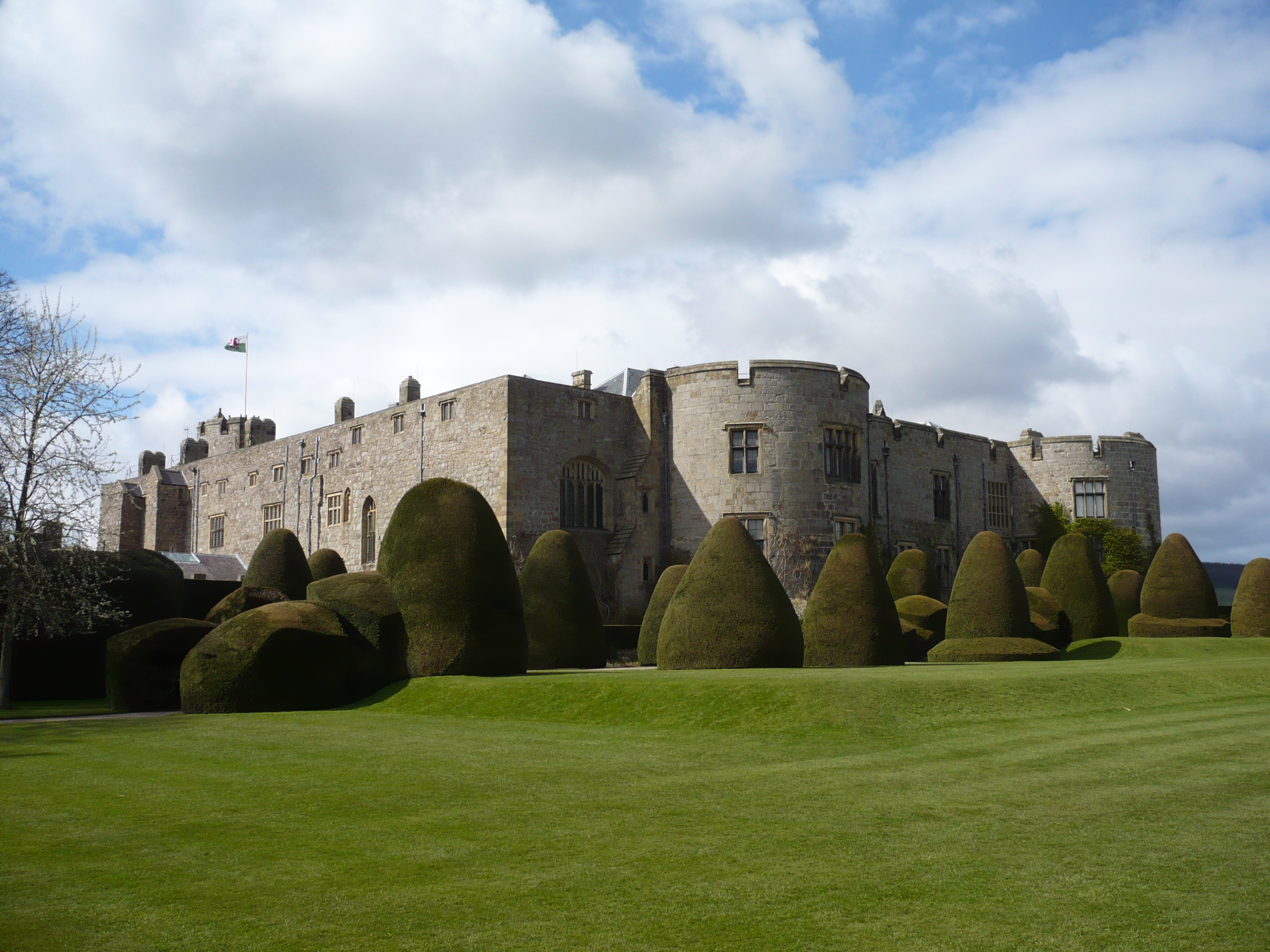
Chirk Castle

Sir Richard Myddelton, 3rd Baronet (23 March 1655 – 29 April 1716), of Chirk Castle, Denbighshire, was a Welsh landowner and Tory politician who sat in the House of Commons from 1685 to 1716.

Myddelton was the fourth son of Sir Thomas Myddelton, 1st Baronet of Chirk Castle and his first wife Mary Cholmondley, daughter of Thomas Cholmondley of Vale Royal, Cheshire. He matriculated at Brasenose College, Oxford in 1670 and then travelled abroad. He succeeded to the baronetcy of Chirke in the County of Denbigh on the death of his brother Sir Thomas Myddelton, 2nd Baronet in 1684. On 19 April 1686, he married Frances Whitmore widow of William Whitmore of Balmes. She was one of the Hampton Court Beauties and was the daughter of Sir Thomas Whitmore of Bridgnorth and his wife Hon. Frances Brooke.

In 1684, Myddleton became Recorder and a common councilman for Denbigh and was appointed Custos Rotulorum for Denbighshire. He was Colonel of the Denbighshire Militia in 1684. He was an alderman from 1685 to April 1686. At the 1685 English general election, he was returned unopposed as Member of Parliament (MP) for Denbighshire. He was appointed High Sheriff of Denbighshire for 1688, but was deprived of his posts as Recorder and Custos Rotulorum in 1688. He was returned again unopposed for Denbighshire at the 1689 English general election. In March 1690 he was restored to his post as Custos Rotulorum.

Myddleton was returned as MP for Denbighshire at the 1690 English general election and in 1695. He lost his post as Custos Rotulorum in 1696. On the accession of Queen Anne in 1702, he was restored to the post of Custos Rotulorum and was appointed steward of the lordship of Denbigh June. He held his Parliamentary seat until 1716.

Myddelton died on 29 April 1716, and was buried at Chirk, his funeral costing £365 13s.7d. He and his wife had two daughters Frances and Mary and a son William. His daughter recorded that her father had possessed ‘the penetration and abilities of a statesman, the integrity and firmness of a patriot’ and also, that ‘as long as his health permitted, he was constant in his attendance in the service of the House’. His son William succeeded to the baronetcy, but on his death unmarried in 1718 it became extinct.

Parliament of England
Preceded by Sir John Trevor	Member of Parliament for Denbighshire; 1685–1707	Succeeded by Parliament of Great Britain
Parliament of Great Britain
Preceded by Parliament of England	Member of Parliament for Denbighshire; 1707–1716	Succeeded by Sir Watkin Williams-Wynn, Bt
Baronetage of England
Preceded by Thomas Myddelton	Baronet (of Chirke); 1684–1716	Succeeded by William Myddelton
