= Robert Myddelton (born by 1526) =

Welsh politician

Robert Myddelton (by 1526 – 1566/67), of Ystrad and Denbigh, Denbighshire, was a Welsh politician.

He was a Member (MP) of the Parliament of England for Denbigh Boroughs in 1547.
