= Denbighshire (UK Parliament constituency) =

UK Parliament constituency (1832–1885)

- Former county constituency for the House of Commons
- Preserved county: Denbighshire

1542–1885
- Seats: 1542–1832: One; 1832–1885: Two
- Replaced by: East Denbighshire; West Denbighshire

Denbighshire was a county constituency in Denbighshire, in north Wales, from 1542 to 1885.

== History ==
From 1542, it returned one Member of Parliament (MP), traditionally known as the knight of the shire, to the House of Commons of the Parliament of England until 1707, then to the Parliament of Great Britain until 1800, and to the Parliament of the United Kingdom from 1801. These MPs were elected by the first past the post voting system.

Under the Reform Act 1832, the constituency's representation was increased to two members, elected by the bloc vote system.

The constituency was abolished by the Redistribution of Seats Act 1885 for the 1885 general election, when Denbighshire was split into two single-member constituencies: the Eastern and Western divisions, each returning one Member of Parliament.

== Members of Parliament ==
=== MPs 1542–1604 ===
Parliament	Member
1542	John Salusbury the elder
1545	John Salusbury the younger
1547	Sir John Salusbury the younger
1553 (Mar)	Robert Puleston
1553 (Oct)	Sir John Salusbury the younger
1554 (Apr)	Sir John Salusbury the younger
1554 (Nov)	Sir John Salusbury the younger
1555	Edward Almer
1558	Sir John Salusbury the younger
1558–1559	John Salusbury the younger
1562–1563	Simon Thelwall
1571	Robert Puleston
1572	William Almer
1584	Evan Lloyd
1586	Robert Salesbury
1588–1589	John Edwards / William Almer
1593	Roger Puleston
1597	John Lloyd
1601	Sir John Salusbury

=== MPs 1604–1832 ===
Year	Member	Party
1604	Peter Mutton	
1614	Simon Thelwall	
1621	Sir John Trevor	
1624	Sir Eubulus Thelwall	
1625	Thomas Myddelton	
1626	Sir Eubulus Thelwall	
1628	Sir Eubulus Thelwall	
1629–1640	No Parliaments convened	
April 1640	Sir Thomas Salusbury, 2nd Baronet	
November 1640	Sir Thomas Myddelton	

Year	First Member	Second Member
1653	Not represented in Barebones Parliament	
Two members in first and second protectorate parliaments
1654	Simon Thelwall	John Carter
1656	John Carter	John Jones; Lumley Thelwall

Year	Member	Party
1659	John Carter	
1659	Not represented	
1660	Sir Thomas Myddelton	
1661	Sir Thomas Myddelton, 1st Baronet	
1664	John Wynne	
1679	Sir Thomas Myddelton, 2nd Baronet	
1681	Sir John Trevor	Tory
1685	Sir Richard Myddelton, 3rd Baronet	Tory
1716	Sir Watkin Williams-Wynn, 3rd Baronet	Tory
1727	Sir Watkin Williams-Wynn, 3rd Baronet	Tory
1741	John Myddelton	
1742	Sir Watkin Williams-Wynn, 3rd Baronet	Tory
1749	Sir Lynch Cotton, 4th Baronet	
1774	Sir Watkin Williams-Wynn, 4th Baronet	
1789	Robert Watkin Wynne	
1796	Sir Watkin Williams-Wynn, 5th Baronet	Tory
1832	Great Reform Act: Representation increased to two members	

=== MPs 1832–1885 ===
Election	First member	First party	Second member	Second party
1832	Sir Watkin Williams-Wynn, 5th Baronet	Tory	Robert Myddleton-Biddulph	Whig
1834	Sir Watkin Williams-Wynn, 5th Baronet	Conservative	Robert Myddleton-Biddulph	Whig
1835	Sir Watkin Williams-Wynn, 5th Baronet	Conservative	William Bagot	Conservative
1840	Hugh Cholmondeley	Conservative	William Bagot	Conservative
1841	Sir Watkin Williams-Wynn, 6th Baronet	Conservative	William Bagot	Conservative
1852	Sir Watkin Williams-Wynn, 6th Baronet	Conservative	Robert Myddleton-Biddulph	Whig
1859	Sir Watkin Williams-Wynn, 6th Baronet	Conservative	Robert Myddleton-Biddulph	Liberal
1868	Sir Watkin Williams-Wynn, 6th Baronet	Conservative	George Osborne Morgan	Liberal
May 1885	Sir Herbert Williams-Wynn, 7th Baronet	Conservative	George Osborne Morgan	Liberal
Nov. 1885	Redistribution of Seats Act: Constituency abolished: see East Denbighshire and West Denbighshire			

== Election results ==
=== Elections in the 1830s ===
General election 1830: Denbighshire
Party	Candidate	Votes	%
Tory	Watkin Williams-Wynn	Unopposed	
Registered electors		c. 2,500	
Tory hold			

General election 1831: Denbighshire
Party	Candidate	Votes	%
Tory	Watkin Williams-Wynn	Unopposed	
Registered electors		c. 2,500	
Tory hold			

General election 1832: Denbighshire
Party	Candidate	Votes	%
Tory	Watkin Williams-Wynn	2,528	47.7
Whig	Robert Myddelton Biddulph	1,479	27.9
Tory	Lloyd Kenyon	1,291	24.4
Turnout		3,050	89.7
Registered electors		3,401	
Majority		1,049	19.8
Tory hold			
Majority		188	3.5
Whig win (new seat)			

General election 1835: Denbighshire
Party	Candidate	Votes	%	±%
Conservative	Watkin Williams-Wynn	2,378	46.2	−1.5
Conservative	William Bagot	1,512	29.4	+5.0
Whig	Robert Myddelton Biddulph	1,256	24.4	−3.5
Majority		256	5.0	−14.8
Turnout		2,793	82.4	−7.3
Registered electors		3,395		
Conservative hold		Swing	+0.1	
Conservative gain from Whig		Swing	+3.4	

General election 1837: Denbighshire
Party	Candidate	Votes	%
Conservative	Watkin Williams-Wynn	Unopposed	
Conservative	William Bagot	Unopposed	
Registered electors		3,689	
Conservative hold			
Conservative hold			

=== Elections in the 1840s ===
Williams-Wynn's death caused a by-election.

By-election, 30 January 1840: Denbighshire
Party	Candidate	Votes	%	±%
Conservative	Hugh Cholmondeley	Unopposed		
Conservative hold				

General election 1841: Denbighshire
Party	Candidate	Votes	%	±%
Conservative	Watkin Williams-Wynn	Unopposed		
Conservative	William Bagot	Unopposed		
Registered electors		4,024		
Conservative hold				
Conservative hold				

Williams-Wynn was appointed Steward of the Queen's Lordships and Manors of Bromfield and Yale, requiring a by-election.

By-election, 7 May 1845: Denbighshire
Party	Candidate	Votes	%	±%
Conservative	Watkin Williams-Wynn	Unopposed		
Conservative hold				

General election 1847: Denbighshire
Party	Candidate	Votes	%	±%
Conservative	Watkin Williams-Wynn	2,055	41.3	N/A
Conservative	William Bagot	1,530	30.7	N/A
Whig	Robert Myddleton Biddulph	1,394	28.0	New
Majority		136	2.7	N/A
Turnout		2,490 (est)	63.2 (est)	N/A
Registered electors		3,901		
Conservative hold		Swing	N/A	
Conservative hold		Swing	N/A	

=== Elections in the 1850s ===
General election 1852: Denbighshire
Party	Candidate	Votes	%	±%
Conservative	Watkin Williams-Wynn	2,135	40.5	−0.8
Whig	Robert Myddleton Biddulph	1,611	30.5	+2.5
Conservative	William Bagot	1,532	29.0	−1.7
Turnout		2,639 (est)	67.6 (est)	+4.4
Registered electors		3,901		
Majority		524	10.0	+7.3
Conservative hold		Swing	−1.0	
Majority		79	1.5	N/A
Whig gain from Conservative		Swing	+2.5	

General election 1857: Denbighshire
Party	Candidate	Votes	%	±%
Whig	Robert Myddleton Biddulph	Unopposed		
Conservative	Watkin Williams-Wynn	Unopposed		
Registered electors		4,506		
Whig hold				
Conservative hold				

General election 1859: Denbighshire
Party	Candidate	Votes	%	±%
Liberal	Robert Myddleton Biddulph	Unopposed		
Conservative	Watkin Williams-Wynn	Unopposed		
Registered electors		4,508		
Liberal hold				
Conservative hold				

=== Elections in the 1860s ===
General election 1865: Denbighshire
Party	Candidate	Votes	%	±%
Liberal	Robert Myddleton Biddulph	Unopposed		
Conservative	Watkin Williams-Wynn	Unopposed		
Registered electors		5,333		
Liberal hold				
Conservative hold				

General election 1868: Denbighshire
Party	Candidate	Votes	%	±%
Conservative	Watkin Williams-Wynn	3,355	39.5	N/A
Liberal	George Osborne Morgan	2,720	32.0	N/A
Liberal	Robert Myddleton Biddulph	2,412	28.4	N/A
Majority		635	7.5	N/A
Turnout		5,921 (est)	77.7 (est)	N/A
Registered electors		7,623		
Conservative hold				
Liberal hold				

=== Elections in the 1870s ===
General election 1874: Denbighshire
Party	Candidate	Votes	%	±%
Liberal	George Osborne Morgan	Unopposed		
Conservative	Watkin Williams-Wynn	Unopposed		
Registered electors		7,323		
Liberal hold				
Conservative hold				

=== Elections in the 1880s ===
General election 1880: Denbighshire
Party	Candidate	Votes	%	±%
Liberal	George Osborne Morgan	Unopposed		
Conservative	Watkin Williams-Wynn	Unopposed		
Registered electors		7,469		
Liberal hold				
Conservative hold				

Morgan was appointed Judge Advocate General of the Armed Forces, requiring a by-election.

By-election, 14 May 1880: Denbighshire
Party	Candidate	Votes	%	±%
Liberal	George Osborne Morgan	Unopposed		
Liberal hold				

Wynn's death caused a by-election.

By-election, 27 May 1885: Denbighshire
Party	Candidate	Votes	%	±%
Conservative	Herbert Williams-Wynn	Unopposed		
Conservative hold				
