= Sir Thomas Myddelton, 2nd Baronet =

Welsh-based Member of English Parliament

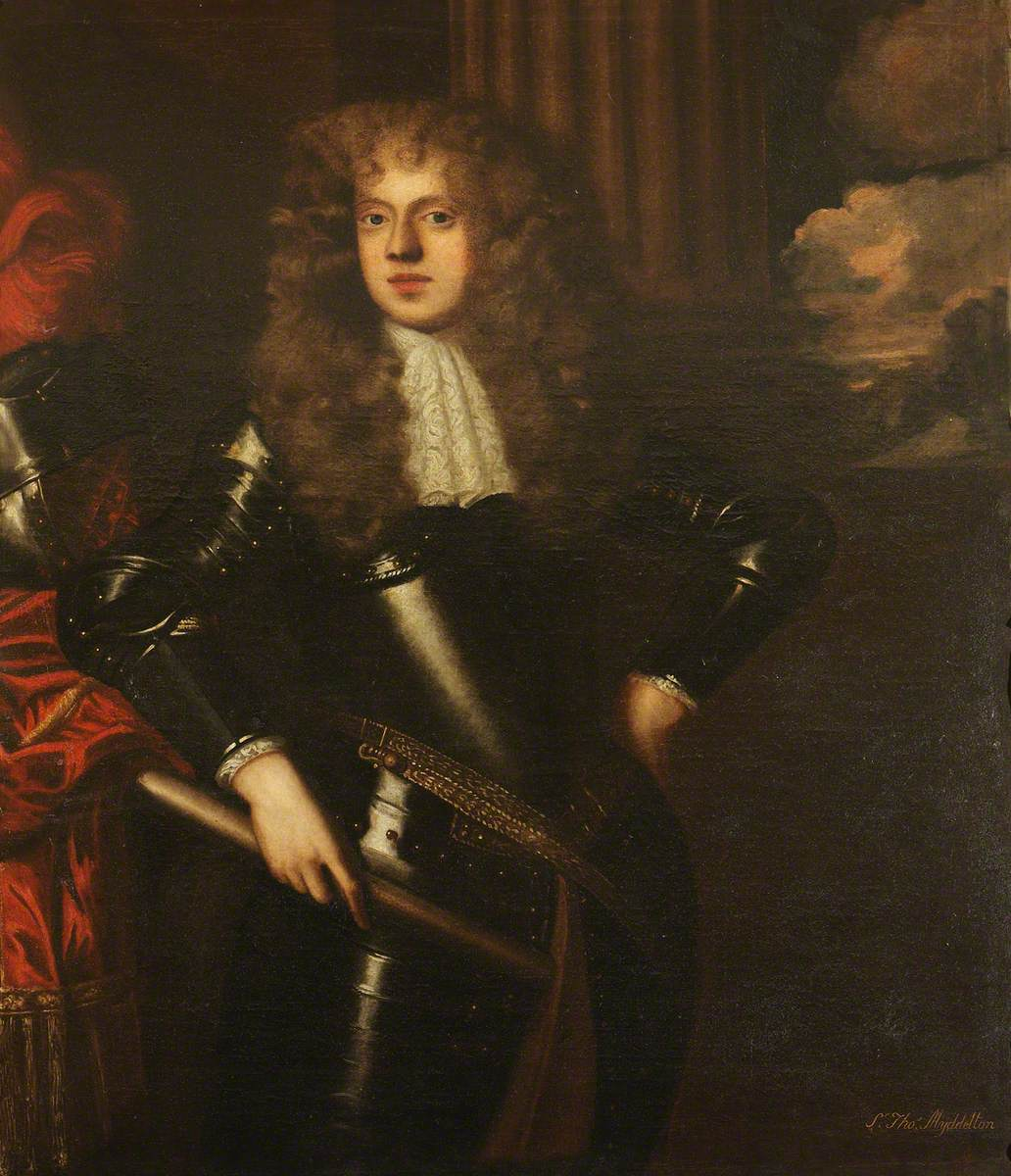
Sir Thomas Myddelton

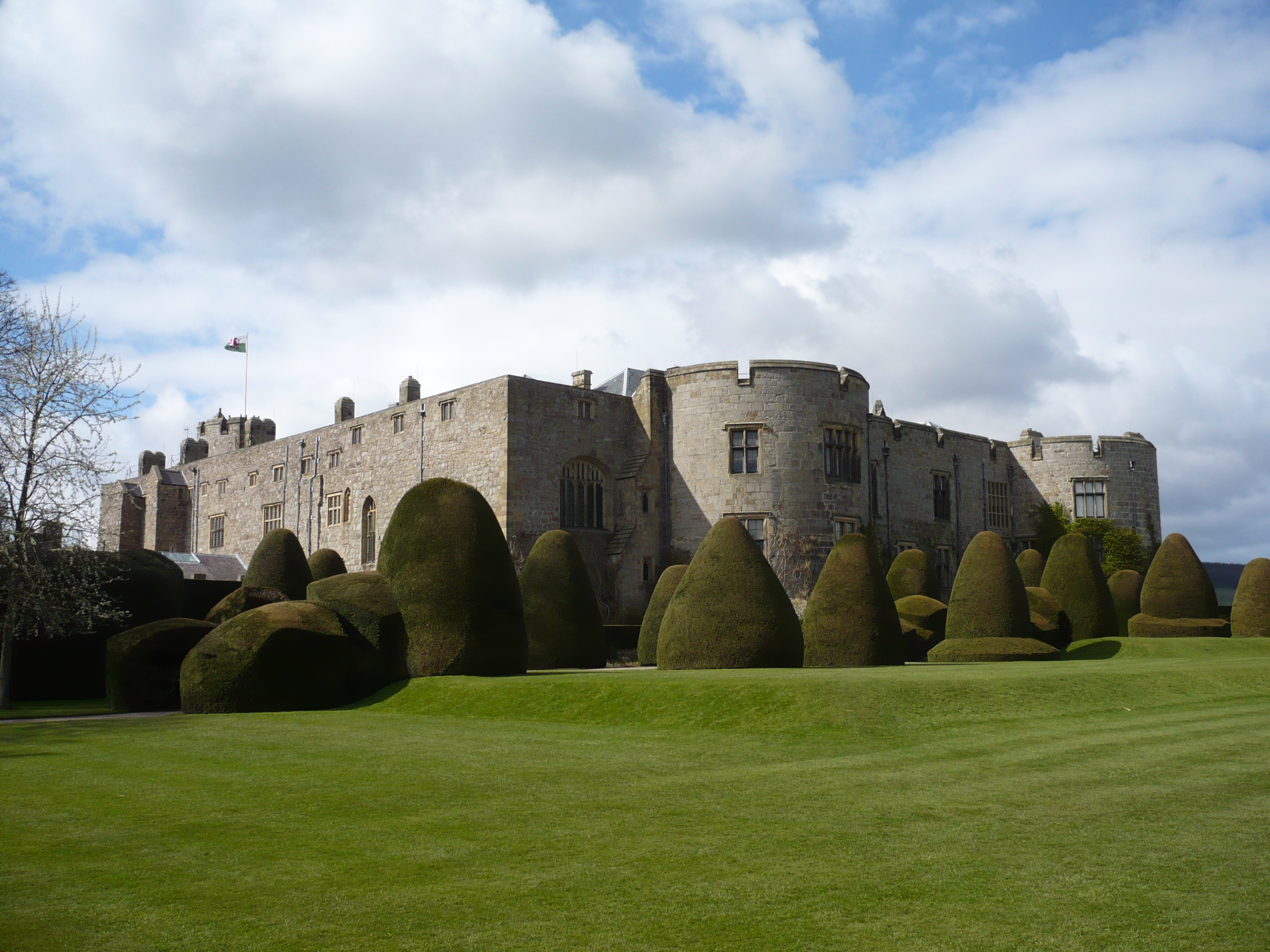
Chirk Castle

Sir Thomas Myddelton, 2nd Baronet (ca. 1651 – 5 February 1684) was a Welsh politician who sat in the House of Commons between 1679 and 1681.

Myddelton was the eldest son of Sir Thomas Myddelton, 1st Baronet and his first wife Mary Cholmondley, daughter of Thomas Cholmondley of Vale Royal, Cheshire. He succeeded to the baronetcy of Chirke in the County of Denbigh on the early death of his father in 1664. and inherited Chirk Castle on the death of his grandfather in 1666.

In 1679, Myddelton was elected MP for Denbighshire and sat until 1681.

Myddelton's first wife was Elizabeth Wilbraham, daughter of Sir Thomas Wilbraham of Weston Park, Weston-under-Lizard, Staffordshire. She died in childbirth in 1675 aged 22. Myddelton sent to Weston for her portrait, so that the sculptor Bushell of Chester could make a monument to her, which was erected in Chirk churchyard; the portrait was not returned and is lost. He later married Charlotte Bridgeman, daughter of Sir Orlando Bridgeman, 1st Baronet. Their only child was a daughter, Charlotte (1680–1731), who married Edward Rich, 6th Earl of Warwick. Myddleton was succeeded in the baronetcy and the Chirk estate by his younger brother Richard.

Parliament of England
Preceded by John Wynne	Member of Parliament for Denbighshire; 1679–1681	Succeeded by Sir John Trevor
Baronetage of England
Preceded by Thomas Myddelton	Baronet (of Chirke); 1663–1684	Succeeded by Richard Myddelton
