= Sir Thomas Myddelton, 1st Baronet =

Welsh politician (1624–1663)

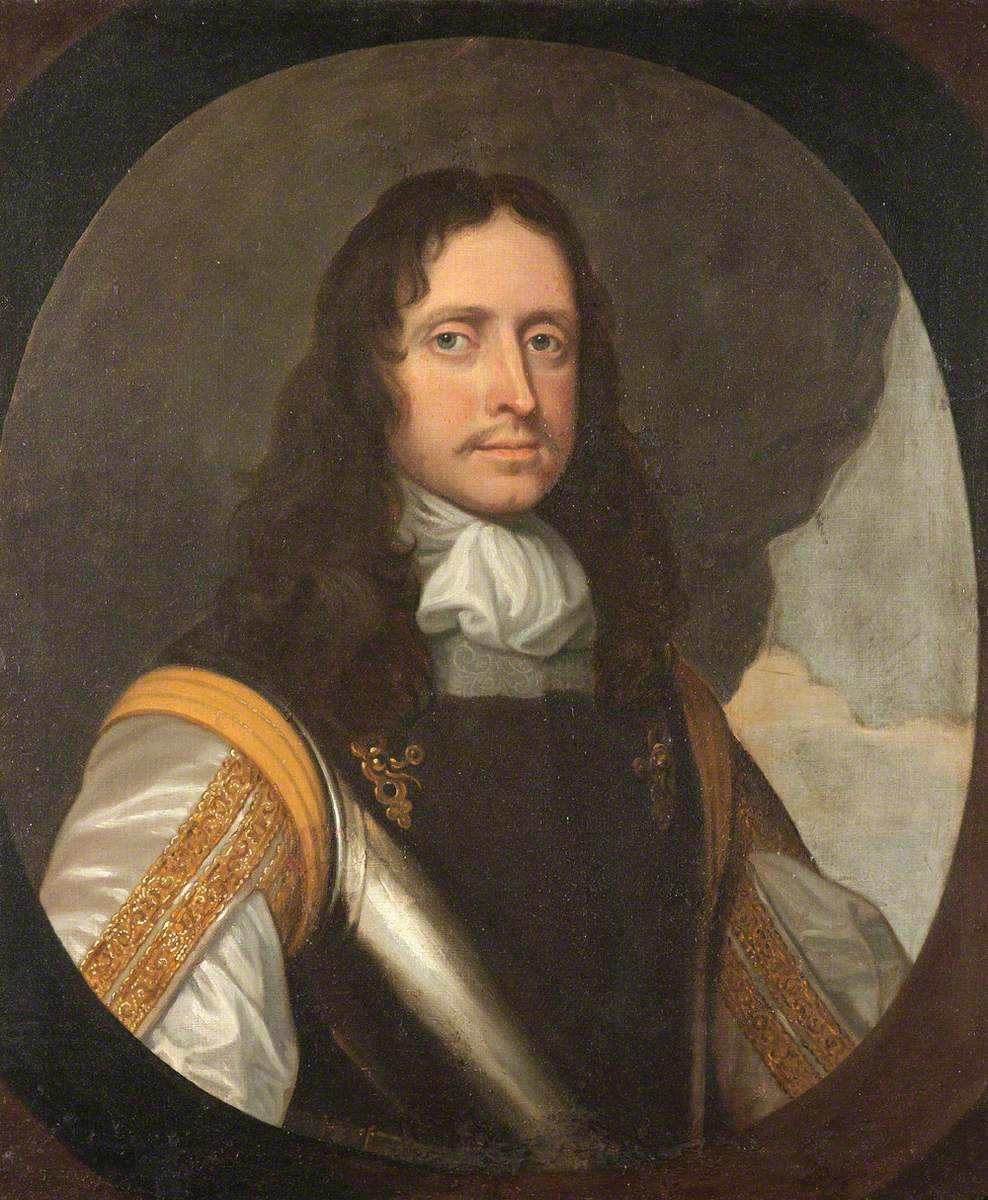
Sir Thomas Myddelton

Sir Thomas Myddelton, 1st Baronet (2 November 1624 – 13 July 1663) was a Welsh politician who sat in the House of Commons variously between 1646 and 1663. He supported the Parliamentary cause in the English Civil War but later took part in the Cheshire Uprising (1659) in support of the Restoration.

== Biography ==
Myddelton was the second son of the politician and Parliamentary general Sir Thomas Myddelton and the grandson of Sir Thomas Myddelton who was Lord Mayor of London in 1613. He matriculated at Oriel College, Oxford on 20 March 1640.

He acted as ‘liaison’ between parliament and his father who was campaigning on the Welsh border. He was made governor of Chirk Castle on 7 March 1646 and Deputy Lieutenant of Denbighshire on 2 July 1646. In 1646, he was elected Member of Parliament for Flint in the Long Parliament. He was a county commissioner for taxes in 1647 and took part under the ‘ North Wales Association ’ on 21 August 1648. He was excluded from parliament under Pride's Purge in December 1648. He took part In Booth's rebellion and held Chirk Castle until 24 August 1659, when he was given two months to leave the country unless parliament issued a pardon in the meantime.

In 1660, Myddelton was pardoned and elected MP for Montgomery in the Convention Parliament. He was created baronet of Chirke in the County of Denbigh on 4 July 1660. In 1661 he was elected MP for Denbighshire in the Cavalier Parliament and sat until his death in 1663.

Myddelton died in London in his father's lifetime at the age of 38 and was buried at Chirk.

== Family ==
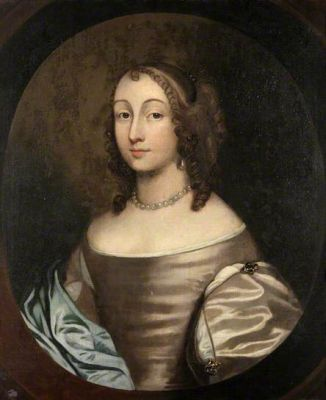
Mary Cholmondeley, 1650, Chirk Castle

Myddelton married firstly Mary Cholmondley, daughter of Thomas Cholmondley of Vale Royal, Cheshire, and secondly Jane Trevor, daughter of John Trevor of Denbighshire. He had five sons and was succeeded in the baronetcy by his eldest son Thomas.

Parliament of England
Vacant Since 1643 Title last held by John Salusbury	Member of Parliament for Flint; 1646–1648	Succeeded by Not represented in the Rump Parliament
Vacant Not represented in the Barebones Parliament, or the First and Second Parliaments of the Protectorate Title last held by George Devereux	Member of Parliament for Montgomery; 1660–1661	Succeeded by John Purcell
Preceded by Sir Thomas Myddelton (younger)	Member of Parliament for Denbighshire; 1661–1663	Succeeded by John Wynne
Baronetage of England
New creation	Baronet (of Chirke); 1660–1663	Succeeded by Thomas Myddelton
