= Thomas Myddelton (younger) =

Welsh politician (1586–1666)

Sir Thomas Myddelton
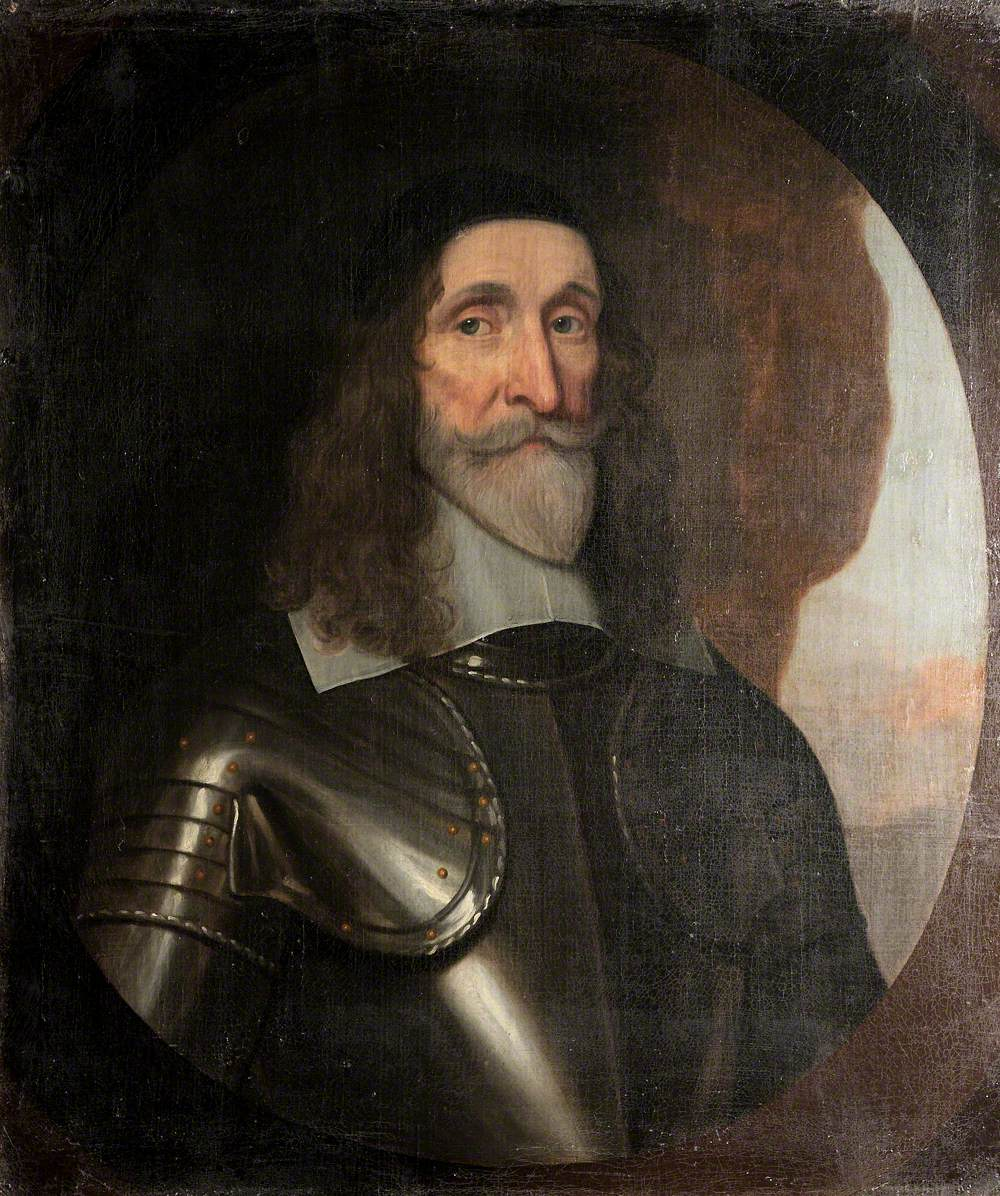
- Sir Thomas Myddelton, copy of a portrait of c.1650

Parliamentarian Sergeant-Major General North Wales
- In office 1643–1645

Member of Parliament for Weymouth
- In office 1624–1625

Member of Parliament for Denbighshire
- In office 1625–1661

Personal details
- Born: July 1586 London
- Died: 11 December 1666 (aged 80) Cefn y Wern, Chirk, Denbighshire
- Resting place: St Mary's Church, Chirk
- Spouse(s): (1) Margaret Savile (2) Mary Napier
- Children: 7 sons; 6 daughters
- Parents: Thomas Myddelton (father); Hester Saltonstall (mother)
- Education: Queen's College, Oxford
- Occupation: Landowner, politician

Military service
- Rank: Sergeant Major General
- Battles/wars: First English Civil War; North Wales 1643; Montgomery; Booth's Uprising

Sir Thomas Myddelton (1586–1666) of Chirk Castle, Denbighshire, was an English-born Welsh landowner, politician, and military officer. He became a Member of Parliament in 1624; during the First English Civil War he was a prominent Parliamentarian general, despite having no previous military experience.

A member of the moderate Parliamentary opposition to the Stuart monarchy, following the execution of Charles I Myddelton gradually drew closer to the Royalists. In 1659 he took part in Booth's Uprising, an unsuccessful attempt to restore Charles II to the throne, but escaped punishment; following the Restoration he remained an active figure in local politics until his death.

== Origins and family ==
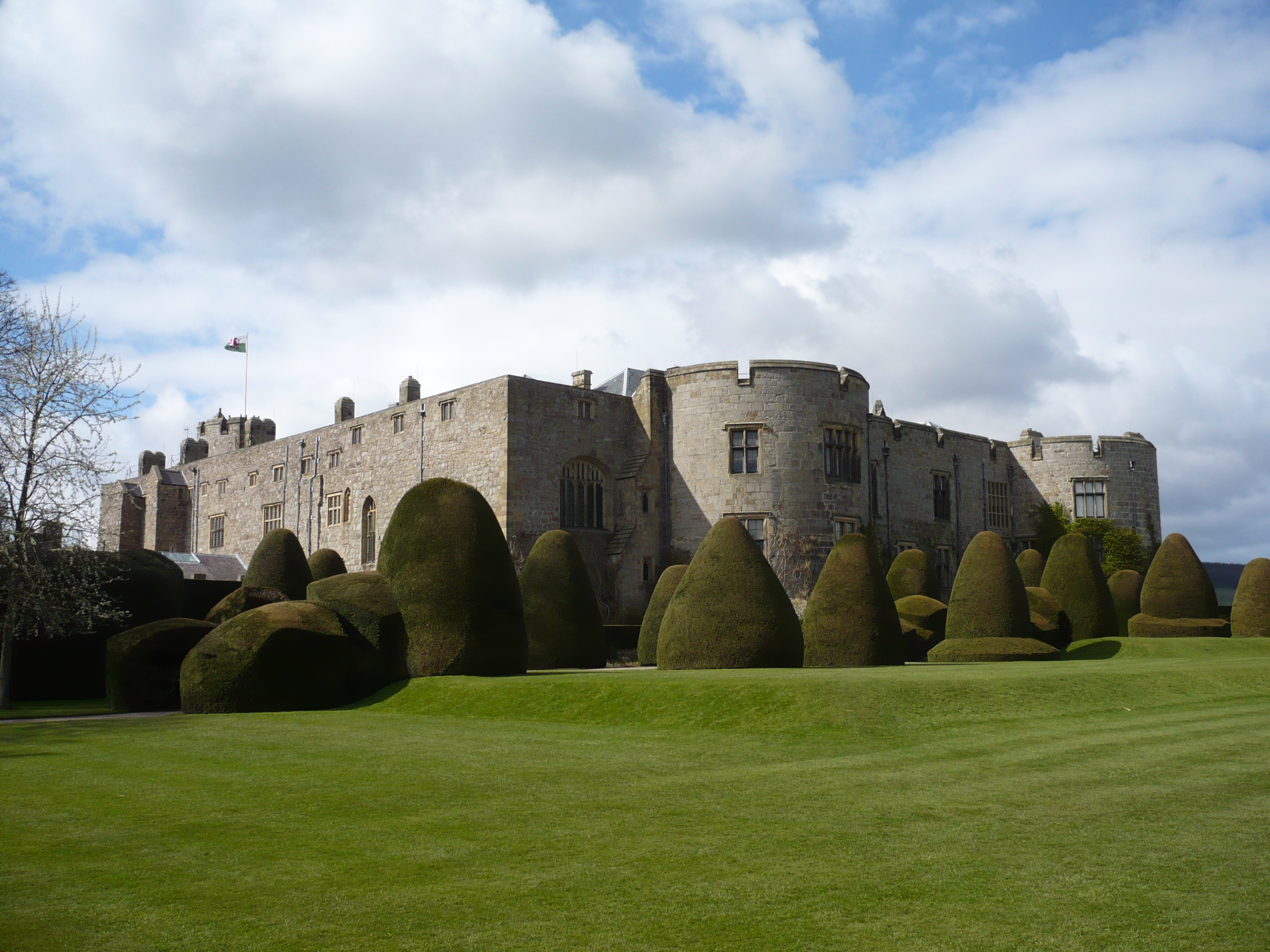
Chirk Castle, purchased by Myddelton's father in 1595

Myddelton was a member of a minor gentry family from Gwaenynog, Denbighshire, who claimed descent from a 12th-century Welsh noble, Rhirid Flaidd. His father, Sir Thomas Myddelton, was a younger son who built up a substantial fortune after being apprenticed to a London grocer, and was an early investor in the East India Company; he later became Lord Mayor of London and purchased the lordship and estate of Chirk Castle. Myddelton's mother Hester Saltonstall was the daughter of another Lord Mayor, Sir Richard Saltonstall.

Myddelton was born in Mincing Lane, London, but spent much of his adult life at Chirk, which his father gave him as a wedding present; he appears to have regarded himself as Welsh despite probably being unable to speak the language. He married twice: first to Margaret Savile, daughter of George Savile of Wakefield in Yorkshire, and secondly to Mary Napier, a daughter of Sir Robert Napier, 1st Baronet (1560-1637), of Luton Hoo, Bedfordshire, by whom he had seven sons and six daughters, including:

- Sir Thomas Myddelton, 1st Baronet (1624–1663), eldest son and heir, created a baronet in 1660
- Ann Myddelton, wife of Edward Herbert, 3rd Baron Herbert of Chirbury

== Life ==
Myddelton matriculated at Queen's College, Oxford, on 22 February 1605, and became a student at Gray's Inn in 1607. Shortly afterwards he returned to the family estates in Wales, where he took responsibility for handling his father's legal and other business. A legal dispute with a neighbouring landowner at Chirk may have been what prompted him in 1624 to seek election to the 4th Parliament of King James I, initially as MP for Weymouth and Melcombe Regis, probably through the sponsorship of London merchant Robert Bateman. The following year he again won the Weymouth election but chose to sit for Denbighshire, his home constituency.

=== First Civil War ===
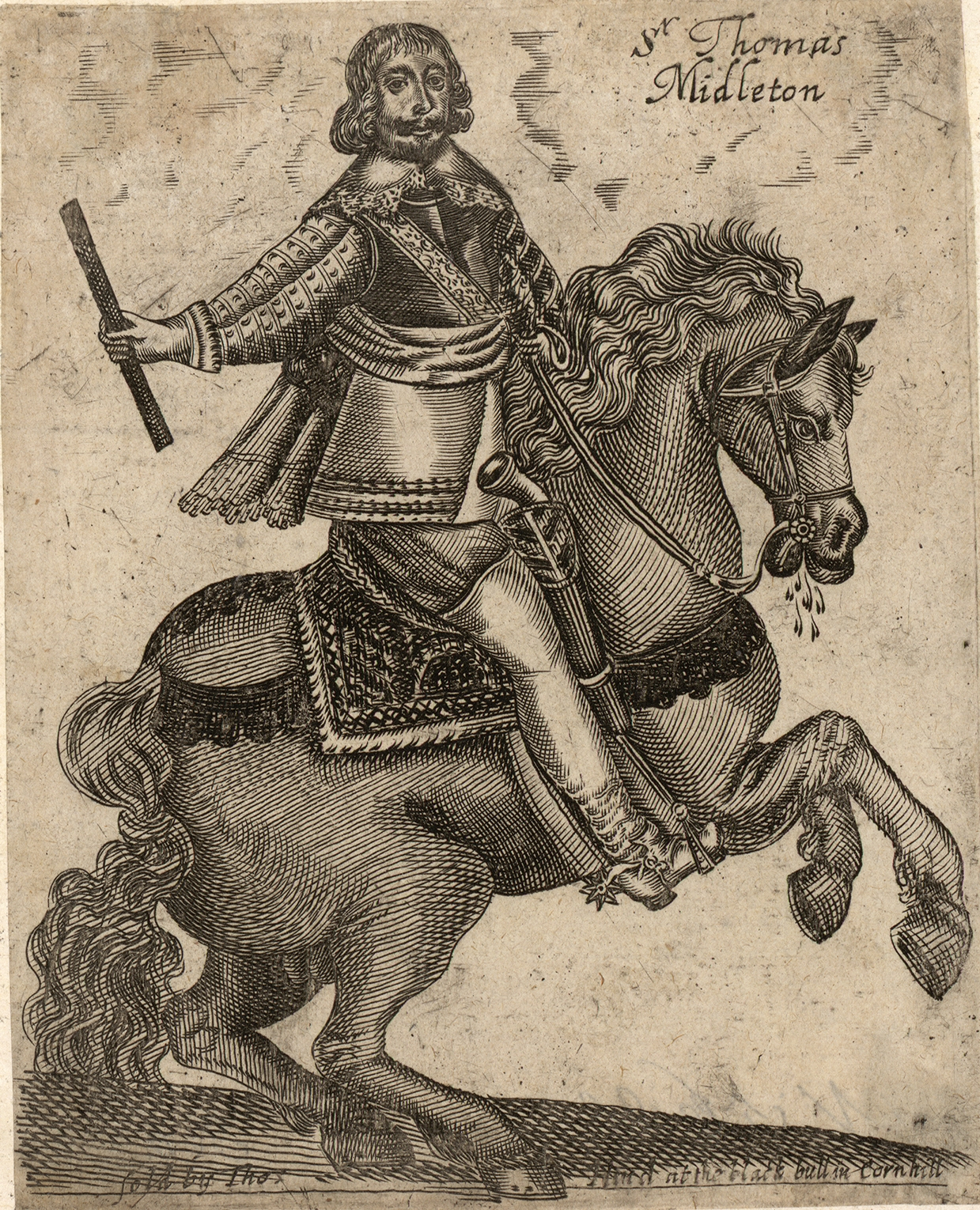
Man identified as Sir Thomas Myddelton, after Civil War-era print by Thomas Hinde (1635-52). Myddelton served as an active field commander in the war, despite being 57 years old at its outbreak

Elected to the Long Parliament, Myddelton was a member of the large Presbyterian faction that dominated it, but other than involvement on a few committees was not particularly active. His main concern appears to have been to find common ground with his fellow Puritan MPs, a term encompassing those who wanted to reform or "purify" the Anglican church, in order to present a united front against Catholic influence on the country.

The outbreak of the First English Civil War in 1642 saw him sent to enforce the Militia Ordinance in Denbighshire, where many of the local gentry were Royalist. In August the county presented a petition to the King for "protection against the orders and ordinances of Parliament" along with a regiment of volunteers and £1000; on Charles's orders Chirk was attacked in Myddelton's absence, the following January, by local Royalist commander Robert Ellice, who installed a garrison and requisitioned Myddelton's money and plate to fund a foot regiment. The loss of his property is supposed to have antagonised Myddelton enough to turn "a moderate politician into an active fighting man".

He was appointed Sergeant-Major General for North Wales in June 1643; despite lacking any previous military experience, he proved a reasonably competent field commander and was respected for "fair treatment" by his men. Parliament gave him authority to raise troops and levy the expenses on the estates of Royalists, though later claimed the arrangement left him £35,000 out of pocket. From August 1643 he joined his brother-in-law Thomas Mytton and Cheshire commander Sir William Brereton in a campaign against Royalist garrisons through the Borders, though resistance by William Salesbury at Denbigh and the landing of an experienced Royalist force from Ireland in November meant they failed to retake North Wales.

Myddelton's command in North Wales was confirmed by a fresh commission in 1644. His forces captured Newtown on 4 September, and secured the surrender of Montgomery Castle the following day. Myddelton, Mytton and Brereton defeated a Royalist attempt to retake Montgomery on 17 September in a major victory which destroyed much of the Royalist field army in North Wales. However, Myddelton still failed to gain control of Denbighshire or retake his own castles of Ruthin or Chirk, which he besieged in late December.

=== Interregnum ===
The self-denying ordinance of May 1645, which stipulated MPs could not hold military command, led to Myddelton being recalled to Westminster and his command transferred to Mytton. He regained control of his estates at the war's end in 1646. During the Second English Civil War he was again given overall responsibility for North Wales, where a short-lived rebellion under Sir John Owen was suppressed at Y Dalar Hir in June 1648, but left command in the field to Mytton.

By the end of the Second Civil War many in Parliament felt Charles could not be trusted to keep to any peace settlement, and he was tried for treason. Along with many other political moderates, Myddelton strongly opposed the trial and Charles's subsequent execution. He was one of the MPs excluded during Pride's Purge, and his increasing disillusionment with the direction taken by Parliament led to him being linked with the Royalist exiles. In 1651 the government placed a garrison in Chirk, after Myddelton was suspected of being in contact with Charles II; it was not withdrawn until he had entered into a bond of £20,000 for "good behaviour". Although Royalist conspirators unsuccessfully attempted to draw him into a 1655 plot, he spent much of the 1650s at Chirk developing his commercial interests in coal mining, limiting his public life to attending the occasional horse race or cockfight.

=== Booth's Uprising and the Restoration ===
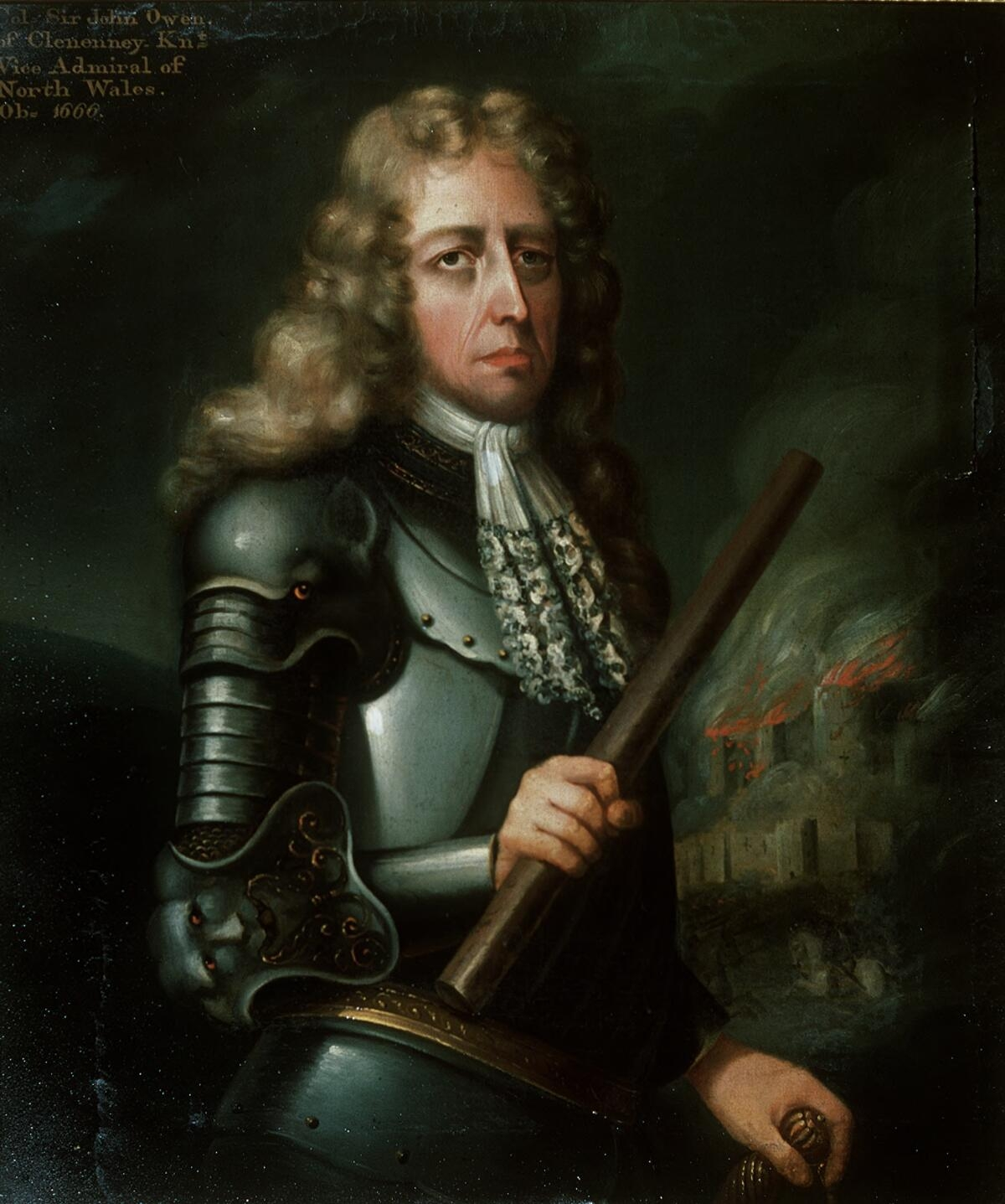
Welsh Royalist John Owen of Clenennau; Owen was alleged to have served under Myddelton in Booth's Uprising of 1659, despite the two men being opponents in the previous conflicts

In the summer of 1659, Myddelton joined an attempt by a group of conspirators, led by John Mordaunt, to instigate a Royalist rising across several regions of the country. Only the Cheshire insurgency, led by George Booth, had initial success; Myddelton nevertheless joined the rebels, who included previous opponents such as Sir John Owen and Edward Broughton, with an enthusiasm he had failed to show during previous conspiracies in 1651 and 1655. Welcoming a detachment of rebel cavalry to Chirk, he sent a trumpeter to invite the Oswestry militia to join them: they refused, but Myddelton instead led a group to Wrexham where on 7 August he drew his sword in the marketplace and declared Charles II as king. The gesture was not appreciated by Booth, who had been hoping to attract political moderates by avoiding mention of Charles entirely in his proclamations.

The government ordered a force under John Lambert to suppress the rebels, and after Booth's defeat at Winnington Bridge on 19 August, where Myddelton was probably present, the insurgency collapsed. Lambert besieged Chirk, where Myddelton's eldest son Thomas and a number of other Welsh rebels held out, until 24 August; Myddelton himself went into hiding and was suspected to have left the country. He was ordered to have his estates confiscated but before this could be carried out, was recalled to Parliament in February 1660 along with the other expelled members, ultimately leading to the restoration of the monarchy.

== After the Restoration ==
While Myddelton avoided losing his estates, the dismantling of Chirk after the siege had progressed far enough that it remained uninhabitable until the 1670s. Though it was noted that his health "was much impaired by age and the winter", he sat in the Convention Parliament of 1660, standing down in favour of his eldest son in 1661. When the latter died in 1663, Myddelton sponsored his successor as Denbighshire MP, John Wynne of Melai, and remained an influential figure locally until his death in 1666.

Although Myddelton was said to have lost up to £80,000 over the course of the wars, land investments and coalmining interests meant he was probably one of the richest men in the kingdom at the time of his death. His will contained an elaborate statement of his religious beliefs that nevertheless remained "politically evasive": "I am a Protestant, maintaining and believing the three Creeds established and professed by the Church of England in the time of Queen Elizabeth of blessed memory".

== Sources ==
- Dodd, Arthur H. (1959). "MYDDELTON, MYDDLETON, MIDDLETON, of Gwaenynog, Denbigh, Chirk, and Ruthin, Denbighshire, London and Essex". Dictionary of Welsh Biography.
- Jenkins, Geraint (1987). The Foundations of Modern Wales: Wales 1642–1780.
- Healy, Simon (2010). "MYDDELTON, Sir Thomas II (1586-1666), of Chirk Castle, Denb". History of Parliament Online.
- Henning, Basil (1983). The House of Commons, 1660-1690. Secker and Warburg.
- Plant, David (2009). "Sir Thomas Myddelton". British Civil Wars Project.
- Tucker, Norman (1964). Denbighshire Officers in the Civil War. Gee & Son.
- Underdown, David (1971). Royalist Conspiracy in England, 1649–1660. Archon.

Honorary titles
Preceded by Evan Lloyd	Custos Rotulorum of Denbighshire bef. 1626–1636	Succeeded by Sir Thomas Salusbury, 2nd Baronet
Preceded by Interregnum	Custos Rotulorum of Denbighshire; 1660–1666	Succeeded by The Lord Herbert of Chirbury
