= Christian Richter (painter) =

Swedish painter (1676–1732)

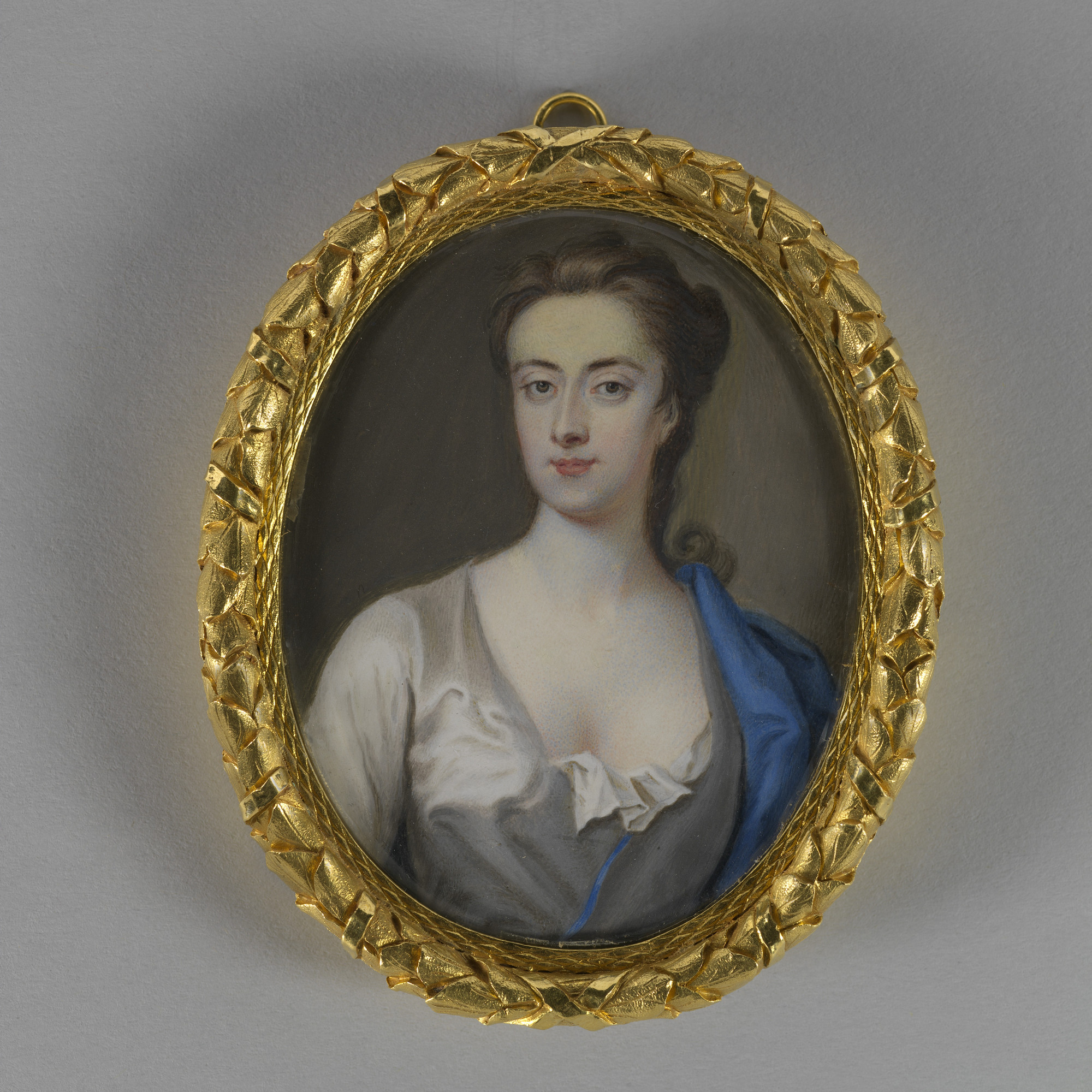
Elizabeth Crewe, Countess of Arran (c. 1700–10)

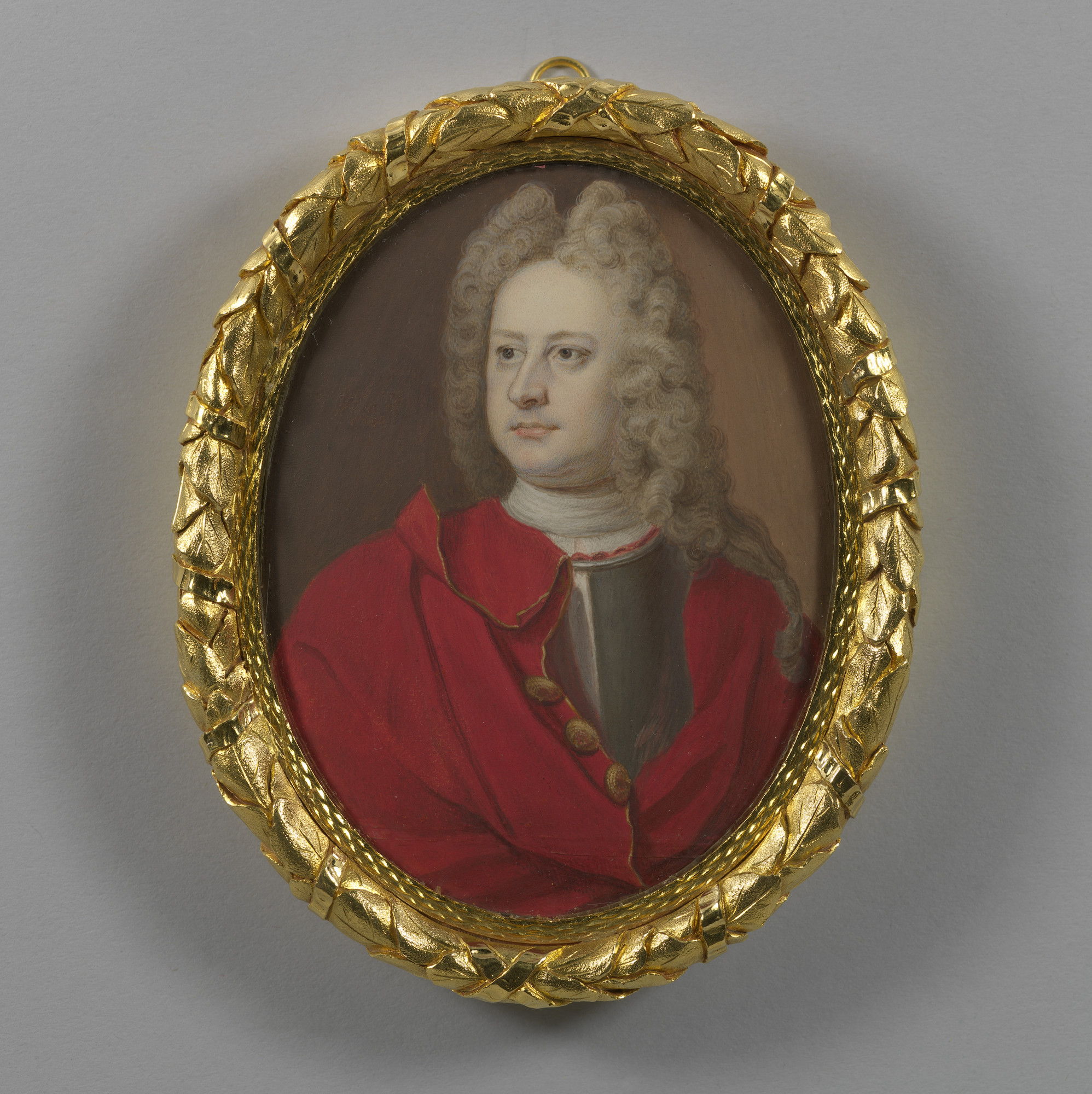
John Richmond Webb (c. 1700–20)

Christian Richter (1678–1732) was a Swedish miniature-painter and copyist, active mainly in England.

== Life ==
=== Family ===
Christian Richter was born in Stockholm, Sweden, in 1678 (although some sources suggest a birth date of c. 1682), the son of the silversmith Hans Davidson Richter (died 1695), assessor of the Stockholm Goldsmiths' corporation, and Brita Bengtsdotter Selling. He came from a family of artists and craftsmen, and his brothers included the landscape painter Johann Richter and the medallist Bengt Richter. The latter visited England for a short time, when he executed a set of medals of the members of the Swedish Club; some specimens of these are in the British Museum.

=== Training ===
Christian Richter's father had intended to enter him on the goldsmiths' lists but died in 1695 before this could be arranged. His mother entered his name that same year, however, and he appears to have worked for his relation Frantz Boll. He was discharged as a journeyman in 1698, after less than three years, and with his brother Bengt went to study medal engraving under Arvid Karlsteen. Around this time he took up portrait-painting, especially in miniature and enamel, and may have learnt to paint from Karlsteen (who occasionally painted miniatures) or perhaps with Elias Brenner, the leading Swedish miniaturist of his time. Wilhelm Nisser noted that Richter's 1701 miniature of the Stockholm merchant Samuel Worster 'betrays a very great capacity'.

Richter afterwards visited Berlin and then went on to Dresden, where he had good introductions from Karlsteen. There he modelled a wax portrait of Augustus II, although his hope of an appointment at the court of Saxony was disappointed, and he left for London.

=== London ===
Richter arrived in London some time between 1702 and 1704. There he met his compatriots the painters Hans Huysing and Michael Dahl, and the enamellist Charles Boit. Richter was patronised by Dahl, whose manner he imitated. His skill in producing small limned copies of Dahl's and Huysing's oil paintings would undoubtedly have further promoted their reputations. According to George Vertue, the engraver and antiquary, Richter became an excellent copyist of Dahl's works, and also those of Vandyck, Lely, and Kneller.

He had some skill as an original miniature-painter, but was hampered in his art by ill-health. Vertue described Richter's style: 'his Manner of Painting very tender and Curious, his tincts had a great variety his pencil regular and neat, his lines of drawing very just & toucht with freedom'.

=== Death ===
He died in November 1732, aged 50, and was buried in the churchyard of St. James's, Westminster.

== Works ==
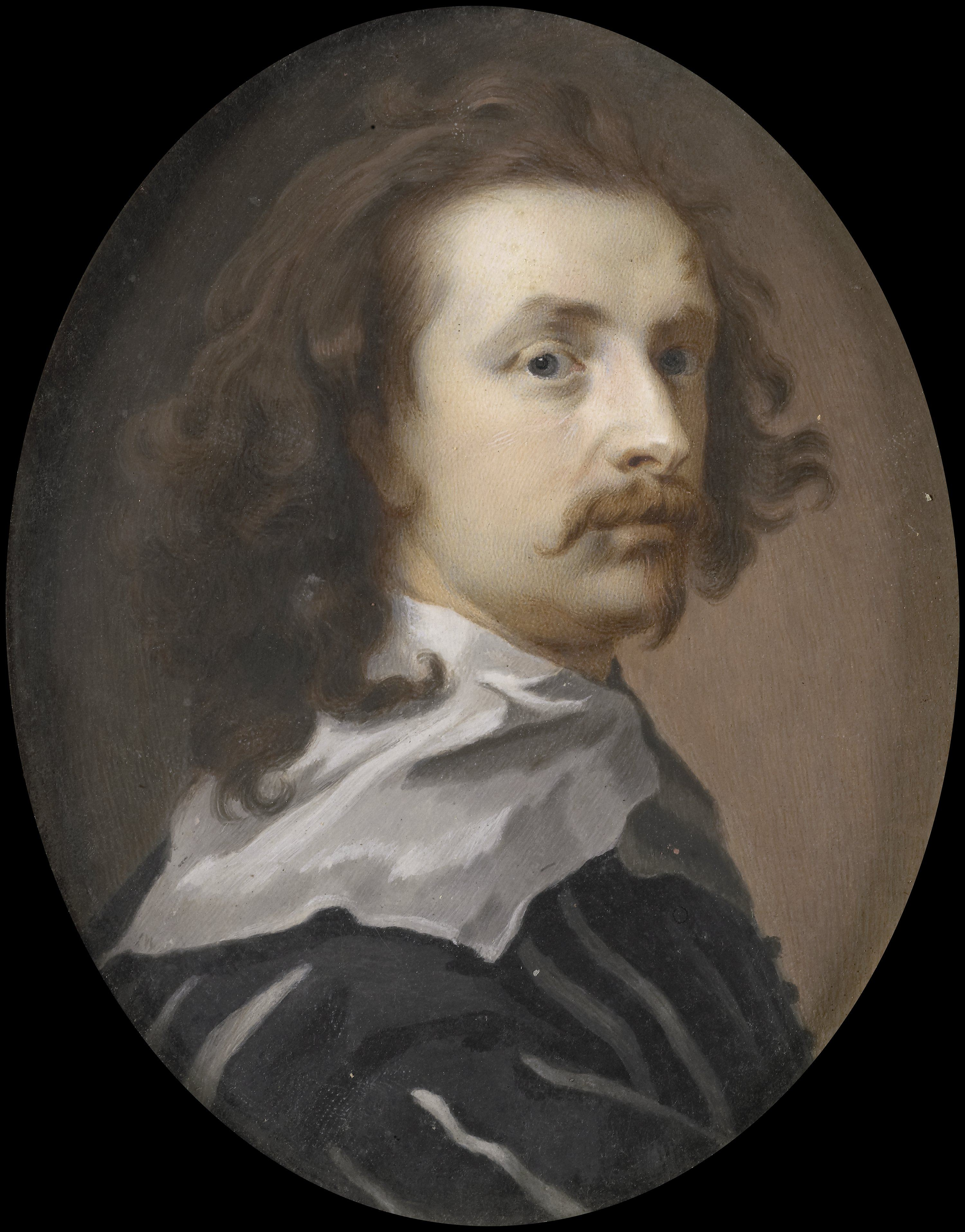
Miniature after a self-portrait of Vandyck (1711)

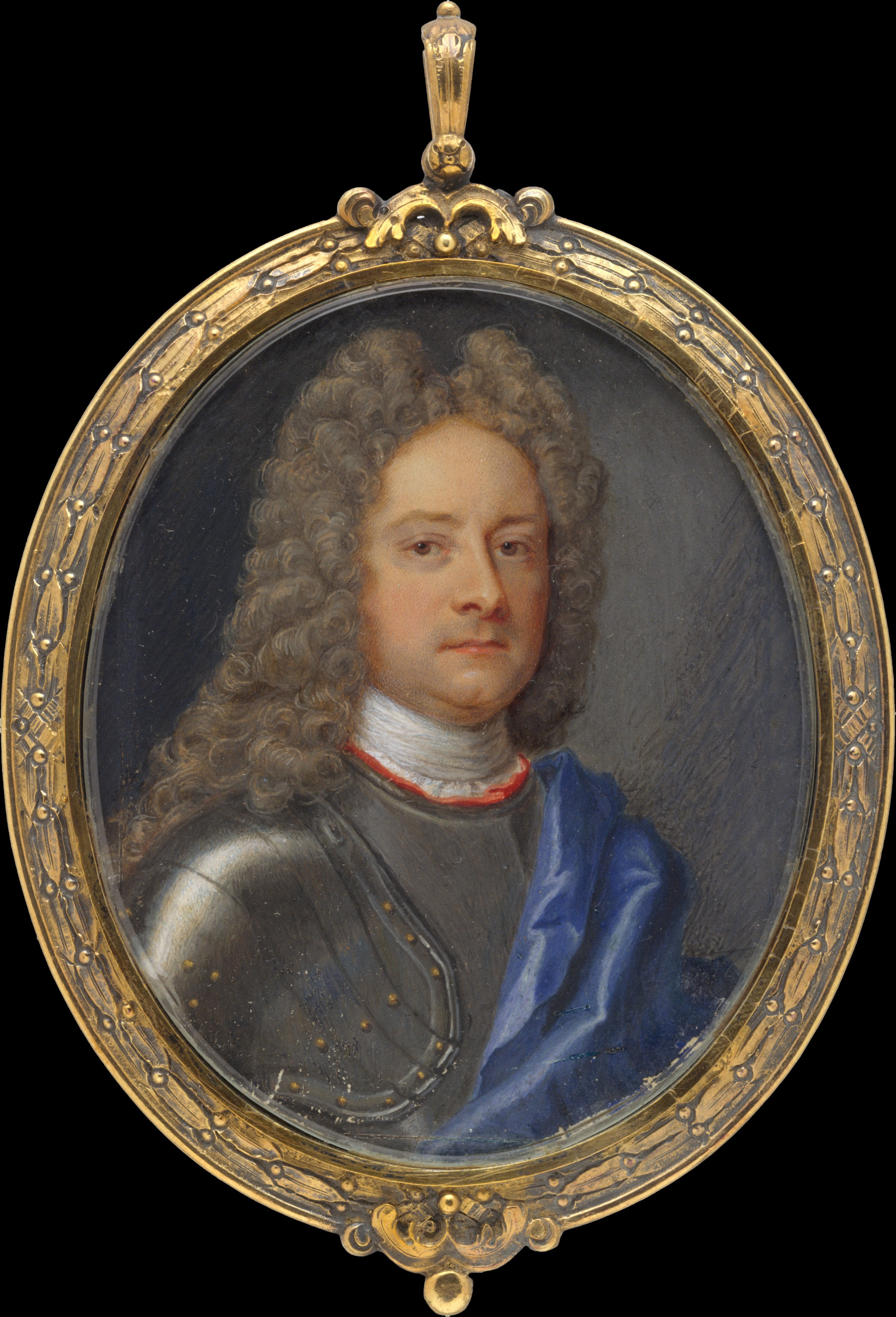
John Churchill, 1st Duke of Marlborough

- View of AbergavennyOxfordshire (Wroxton Abbey): Viscountess Tyrconnel (1709, miniature)
- Amsterdam: miniature copied after Vandyck
- London (National Portrait Gallery): Stephen Duck (c. 1740, watercolour and gouache/vellum, miniature, attributed)
- London (Victoria and Albert Museum): Lady Margaret Bagot
- London (Wallace Collection): Portrait of Cromwell (miniature, after Samuel Cooper)
- Stockholm (Nationalmus.): Portrait of Samuel Worster; Duchess of Marlborough.
