= Barrington baronets of Limerick (1831) =

Escutcheon of the Barrington baronets of Limerick

The Barrington baronetcy, of the City of Limerick, was created in the Baronetage of the United Kingdom on 30 September 1831, for Joseph Barrington. His grandson the 3rd Baronet died childless in 1872, and was succeeded by his younger brother. Since the latter's grandson, the 6th Baronet, had only two daughters, the next baronet was his younger brother. The 7th Baronet died unmarried. As of 2014, the title is held by his kinsman, the 8th Baronet, who succeeded in 2003.

The family seat was Glenstal Abbey, near Murroe, County Limerick. They sold Glenstal and left Ireland in the 1920s, a move largely prompted by the killing of Winifred Barrington, the 5th Baronet's daughter, in an ambush during the Irish War of Independence.

As of 2026, the baronetage is marked dormant on the Official Roll.

== Barrington baronets, of Limerick (1831) ==
- Sir Joseph Barrington, 1st Baronet (1764–1846)
- Sir Matthew Barrington, 2nd Baronet (1788–1861)
- Sir William Hartigan Barrington, 3rd Baronet (1815–1872)
- Sir Croker Barrington, 4th Baronet (1817–1890)
- Sir Charles Burton Barrington, 5th Baronet (1848–1943)
- Sir Charles Bacon Barrington, 6th Baronet (1902–1980)
- Sir Alexander Fitzwilliam Croker Barrington, 7th Baronet (1909–2003)
- Sir Benjamin Barrington, 8th Baronet (b. 1950). His name does not appear on the Official Roll of the Baronetage.

The heir apparent is the present holder's son Patrick Benjamin Barrington (b.1988).

== Notes ==
Baronetage of the United Kingdom
Preceded by Anson baronets	Barrington baronets of Limerick; 30 September 1831	Succeeded by Birch baronets
