= John Kingsmill =

John Kingsmill may refer to:

- John Kingsmill (actor)
- John Kingsmill (MP for Heytesbury), represented Heytesbury (UK Parliament constituency)
- John Kingsmill (MP for Ludgershall)
