= George Cope =

George Cope may refer to:

- George Cope (MP) (c. 1534–1572), MP for Ludgershall
- George A. Cope (born 1961), CEO of BCE/Bell Canada
- George Cope (tobacco manufacturer) (1822–1888), English tobacco manufacturer
- George Cope (artist) (1855–1929), American painter

== See also ==
- Cope (surname)
