= Welbore =

Welbore is a given name. Notable people with the name include:

- George James Welbore Agar-Ellis, Baron Dover (1797–1833), English man of letters
- Welbore Ellis, 1st Baron Mendip (1713–1802), British statesman
