= Comptroller of the Household =

Official position in the British royal household

The Comptroller of the Household is a historical position in the British royal household, nominally the second-ranking member of the Lord Steward's department after the Treasurer of the Household. The Comptroller was an ex officio member of the Board of Green Cloth, until that body was abolished in the reform of local government licensing in 2004. In recent times, a senior government whip has invariably occupied the office. On state occasions the Comptroller (in common with certain other senior officers of the Household) carries a white staff of office, as often seen in portraits.

"Comptroller" is an alternative spelling of "controller", recorded since around 1500 in a number of British titles, and later also in the United States. The variant in spelling results from the influence of French compte "account".

== History ==
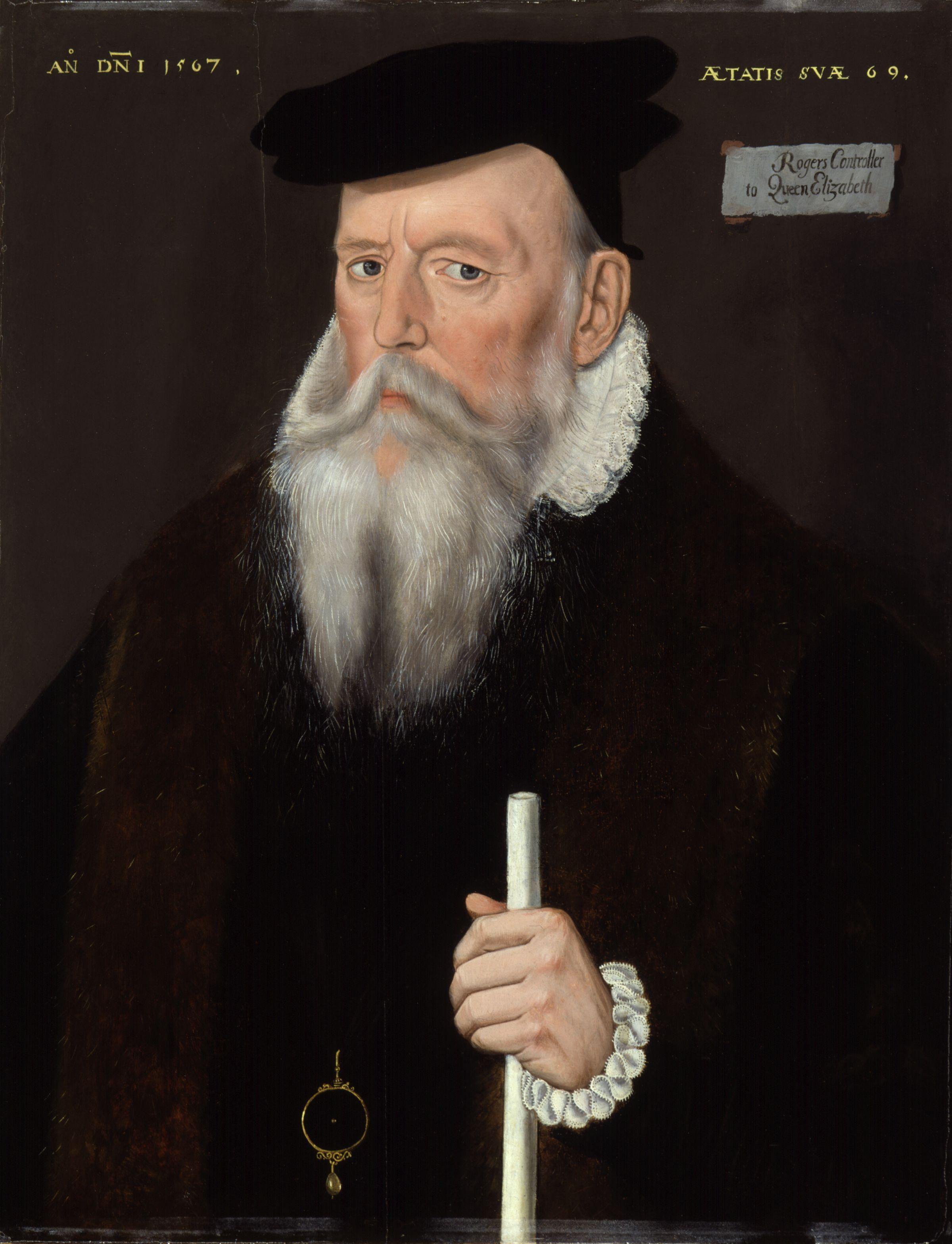
Sir Edward Rogers, 'Controller to Queen Elizabeth' in the 1560s, holding his white staff of office

The office of Comptroller of the Household derives from the medieval Household office of Controller of the Wardrobe, who was deputy to the Keeper (or Treasurer) of the Wardrobe, as well as an important official in his own right as keeper of the Privy Seal. Later, both these offices became high-ranking political appointments.

== Modern role ==
In modern times, the Comptroller has become a less prominent position in British politics. The holder is the third-most senior Government whips in the House of Commons and is responsible for the day-to-day activity in the House. Their responsibilities for the Royal Household are now largely ceremonial, such as serving as an usher at royal garden parties.

== Known incumbents ==
=== 15th century ===
- 1399–1400: Sir Robert Lytton
- 1402–1413: John Spencer
- after 1413: Sir Robert Babthorpe
- 1432–c1450: Thomas Stanley, 1st Baron Stanley
- 1460: Thomas Charlton
- 1461–?1470: Sir John Scott
- 1471–1475: Sir William Parr
- 1475–1481: Sir Robert Wingfield
- 1481–1483: Sir William Parr
- 1483–1485: Sir Robert Percy of Scotton
- 1485–1489: Sir Richard Edgecumbe
- 1489?–1492: Sir Roger Tocotes
- 1492–1494: vacant
- 1494–1506: Sir Richard Guildford

=== 16th century ===
- 1507–1509: Sir John Hussey
- 1509–1519: Sir Edward Poynings
- Sir Thomas Parr
- 1519–1521: Sir Thomas Boleyn
- 1521–1532: Sir Henry Guildford
- 1532–1537: Sir William Paulet
- 1537–1539: Sir John Russell
- 1539–1540: Sir William Kingston
- 1540–1547: Sir John Gage
- 1547–1550: Sir William Paget
- 1550–1552: Sir Richard Wingfield
- 1552–1553: Sir Richard Cotton
- 1553–1557: Sir Robert Rochester
- 1557–1558: Sir Thomas Cornwallis
- 1558–1559: Sir Thomas Parry
- 1559–1568: Sir Edward Rogers
- 1568: Anthony Crane
- 1568–1570: vacant
- 1570–1590: Sir James Croft
- 1590–1596: vacant
- 1596–1602: William Knollys, 1st Earl of Banbury

=== 17th century ===
- 1602–1604: Sir Edward Wotton
- c1604: William Pitt
- 1616–1618: Sir Thomas Edmonds
- 1618–1622: Sir Henry Cary (so created 1620)
- 1622–1627: Sir John Suckling
- 1627–1629: Sir John Savile, created a baron in 1628.
- 1629–1639: Henry Vane the Elder
- 1639–1641: Sir Thomas Jermyn
- 1641–1643: Sir Peter Wyche
- 1643–1646: Christopher Hatton, 1st Baron Hatton
- 1660–1662: Sir Charles Berkeley
- 1662–1666: Sir Hugh Pollard, 2nd Baronet
- 1666–1668: Sir Thomas Clifford
- 1668–1672: Francis Newport, 2nd Baron Newport
- 1672–1687: William Maynard, 2nd Baron Maynard
- 1687–1688: Henry Waldegrave, 1st Baron Waldegrave
- 1689–1702: Thomas Wharton, 5th Baron Wharton

=== 18th century ===
- 1702–1704: Sir Edward Seymour, 4th Baronet
- 1704–1708: Sir Thomas Mansell, Bt
- 1708: Hugh Cholmondeley, 1st Earl of Cholmondeley
- 1708–1709: Sir Thomas Felton, 4th Baronet
- 1709–1711: Sir John Holland, 2nd Baronet
- 1711–1712: George Granville, 1st Baron Lansdowne
- 1713–1714: Sir John Stonhouse, 3rd Baronet
- 1714–1720: Hugh Boscawen
- 1720–1725: Paul Methuen
- 1725–1730: Daniel Finch, Lord Finch
- 1730–1754: Sir Conyers Darcy
- 1754–1756: Wills Hill, 1st Earl of Hillsborough
- 1756: John Hobart, Lord Hobart
- 1756–1761: Richard Edgcumbe, 2nd Baron Edgcumbe
- 1761: Henry Herbert, 1st Earl of Powis
- 1761–1762: Lord George Cavendish
- 1762–1763: Humphry Morice
- 1763–1765: Lord Charles Spencer
- 1765–1774: Thomas Pelham
- 1774–1777: Sir William Meredith, 3rd Baronet
- 1777–1779: George Onslow, 4th Baron Onslow
- 1779–1782: Sir Richard Worsley, 7th Baronet
- 1782–1784: Peter Ludlow, 1st Earl Ludlow
- 1784–1787: Robert Monckton-Arundell, 4th Viscount Galway
- 1787–1790: John Villiers
- 1790–1791: Dudley Ryder
- 1791–1797: George Parker, 4th Earl of Macclesfield
- 1797–1804: Lord Charles Somerset

=== 19th century ===
- 1804–1812: Lord George Thynne
- 1812–1830: Lord George Beresford
- 1830–1834: Lord Robert Grosvenor
- 1834–1835: Hon. Henry Lowry-Corry
- 1835–1841: George Byng
- 1841: Lord Marcus Hill
- 1841–1846: George Dawson-Damer
- 1846–1847: Lord Marcus Hill
- 1847–1851: William Lascelles
- 1851–1852: George Phipps, Earl of Mulgrave
- 1852: George Weld-Forester
- 1853–1856: Archibald Douglas, Viscount Drumlanrig
- 1856–1858: Valentine Browne, Viscount Castlerosse
- 1858–1859: George Weld-Forester
- 1859–1866: Granville Leveson Proby, Lord Proby
- 1866–1868: Charles Yorke, Viscount Royston
- 1868–1874: Lord Otho FitzGerald
- 1874–1879: Lord Henry Somerset
- 1879–1880: Hugh Seymour, Earl of Yarmouth
- 1880–1885: William Edwardes, 4th Baron Kensington
- 1885–1886: Lord Arthur Hill
- 1886: Edward Marjoribanks
- 1886–1892: Lord Arthur Hill
- 1892–1895: George Leveson-Gower
- 1895–1898: Lord Arthur Hill
- 1898–1905: Arthur Annesley, 11th Viscount Valentia

=== 20th century ===
- 1905–1909: Alexander William Charles Oliphant Murray, Master of Elibank
- 1909–1912: Arthur Foljambe, 2nd Earl of Liverpool
- 1912–1915: Geoffrey Cecil Twisleton-Wykeham-Fiennes, 18th Baron Saye and Sele
- 1915–1916: Charles Henry Roberts
- 1916–1919: Sir Edwin Cornwall
- 1919–1921: George Frederick Stanley
- 1921–1924: Harry Barnston
- 1924: John Allen Parkinson
- 1924–1928: Sir Harry Barnston
- 1928–1929: Sir William Cope
- 1929–1931: Thomas Henderson
- 1931: Goronwy Owen
- 1931–1932: Walter Rea
- 1932–1935: Sir Frederick Penny, Bt
- 1935: Sir Victor Warrender, Bt
- 1935: George Bowyer
- 1935–1937: Sir Lambert Ward
- 1937: Sir George Frederick Davies
- 1937–1939: Charles Waterhouse
- 1939–1940: Charles Kerr
- 1940–1942: William Whiteley
- 1942–1945: William John
- 1945: George Mathers
- 1945: Leslie Pym
- 1945–1946: Arthur Pearson
- 1946: Michael Stewart
- 1946–1951: Frank Collindridge
- 1951–1954: Roger Conant
- 1954–1955: Tam Galbraith
- 1955–1957: Hendrie Oakshott
- 1957–1958: Gerald Wills
- 1958–1959: Edward Wakefield
- 1959–1961: Harwood Harrison
- 1961–1964: Robin Chichester-Clark
- 1964–1966: Charles Grey
- 1966–1967: William Whitlock
- 1967–1968: William Howie
- 1968–1970: Ioan Evans
- 1970: Walter Elliot
- 1970–1972: Reginald Eyre
- 1972–1973: Bernard Weatherill
- 1973–1974: Walter Clegg
- 1974–1978: Joseph Harper
- 1978–1979: James Hamilton
- 1979–1981: Spencer le Marchant
- 1981–1983: Anthony Berry
- 1983–1986: Carol Mather
- 1986–1988: Robert Boscawen
- 1988–1989: Tristan Garel-Jones
- 1989–1990: Alastair Goodlad
- 1990: Sir George Young, 6th Baronet
- 1990–1995: David Lightbown
- 1995–1997: Timothy Wood
- 1997–2008: Tommy McAvoy

=== 21st century ===
Portrait	Name	Term of office		Party	Prime Minister
	Tommy McAvoy	2 May 1997	5 October 2008	Labour	Tony Blair
	Tommy McAvoy	2 May 1997	5 October 2008	Labour	Gordon Brown
	John Spellar	5 October 2008	11 May 2010	Labour	Gordon Brown
	Alistair Carmichael	11 May 2010	7 October 2013	Liberal Democrats	David Cameron
	Don Foster	7 October 2013	11 May 2015	Conservative	David Cameron
	Gavin Barwell	11 May 2015	17 July 2016	Conservative	David Cameron
	Mel Stride	17 July 2016	12 June 2017	Conservative	Theresa May
	Christopher Pincher	15 June 2017	5 November 2017	Conservative	Theresa May
	Christopher Heaton-Harris	9 January 2018	9 July 2018	Conservative	Theresa May
	Mark Spencer	15 July 2018	24 July 2019	Conservative	Theresa May
	Jeremy Quin	28 July 2019	16 December 2019	Conservative	Boris Johnson
	Mike Freer	16 December 2019	16 September 2021	Conservative	Boris Johnson
	Marcus Jones	17 September 2021	8 July 2022	Conservative	Boris Johnson
	Rebecca Harris	8 July 2022	5 July 2024	Conservative	Boris Johnson
	Rebecca Harris	8 July 2022	5 July 2024	Conservative	Liz Truss; Rishi Sunak
	Christopher Elmore	10 July 2024	7 September 2025	Labour	Keir Starmer
	Nesil Caliskan	7 September 2025	12 May 2026	Labour	Keir Starmer
	Gen Kitchen	12 May 2026	Incumbent	Labour	Keir Starmer
	Gen Kitchen	12 May 2026	Incumbent	Labour	Andy Burnham
