= Sandford Graham =

English army officer and politician

Sir Sandford Graham, 2nd Baronet (1788–1852) was an English army officer and politician. A university friend of Lord Byron, he took part in Byron's voyage to Greece in 1810–11.

== Life ==
He was the son of Sir James Graham, 1st Baronet and his wife Anne Moore, daughter of the Rev. John Moore of Kirkstall. He was educated at Eton College, and matriculated at Trinity College, Cambridge in 1806, graduating B.A. in 1810 and M.A. in 1813. He was with Byron in Athens in the winter of 1810.

Graham joined the Grenadier Guards and achieved the rank of captain. In 1812 he was elected as Member of Parliament for Aldeburgh. The constituency was controlled by Philip Champion Crespigny. Graham replaced John McMahon there, and held the seat for half a year to the 1812 general election. He was not a candidate in that election: while his father considered that his support for the new Liverpool administration should have meant a seat being found for Graham, Charles Long excused the Tory omission since there were other demands. Sir James then bought into the Ludgershall seat, purchasing the share held by John Townshend, 2nd Viscount Sydney, and asking Magens Dorrien Magens to resign; Sandford Graham became Member of Parliament there at the end of 1812.

During 1813 Graham voted consistently for Catholic relief, against his father's wishes; and in 1815 he was deprived of the Ludgershall seat, with Charles Nicholas Pallmer taking the place. At the 1818 general election his father relented, and Graham was back in Parliament for Ludgershall, now de facto a Whig supporter on most issues. He held the seat until 1826.

Sir James Graham having died in 1825, in 1826 Sandford held his Ludgershall interest, and on it George Agar Ellis was elected that year, it is assumed by purchase from Graham. In 1830 Graham stood himself instead, and was elected with Edward Thomas Foley. At the end of 1832 Graham left national politics.

== Family ==
Graham married in 1819 Caroline Langston, daughter of John Langston MP. They had three sons and two daughters.

== Notes ==
Parliament of the United Kingdom
Preceded by Sir John Aubrey, Bt; John McMahon	Member of Parliament for Aldeburgh; April 1812 – October 1812; With: Sir John Aubrey, Bt	Succeeded by The Lord Dufferin and Claneboye; Andrew Strahan
Preceded by Magens Dorrien Magens; Joseph Hague Everett	Member of Parliament for Ludgershall; 1812–1815; With: Joseph Birch	Succeeded by Charles Nicholas Pallmer; Joseph Birch
Preceded by The Earl of Carhampton; Joseph Birch	Member of Parliament for Ludgershall; 1818 – 1826; With: The Earl of Carhampton 1818–1821; Earl of Brecknock 1821–1826	Succeeded by Edward Thomas Foley; George Agar-Ellis
Preceded by Edward Thomas Foley; George Agar-Ellis	Member of Parliament for Ludgershall; 1830 – 1832; With: Edward Thomas Foley	Constituency abolished
Baronetage of the United Kingdom
Preceded by James Graham	Baronet (of Kirkstall); 1825–1852	Succeeded by Sandford Graham
