= Charles Danvers (disambiguation) =

Charles Danvers was a soldier, plotter and MP.

Charles Danvers may also refer to:

- Charles Danvers (MP for Ludgershall)
- Charles Danvers (songwriter)
