= Edward Thomas Foley =

English Tory (and later Conservative) politician

Edward Thomas Foley (21 December 1791 – 30 March 1846), of Stoke Edith, Herefordshire, was an English Tory (and later Conservative) politician.

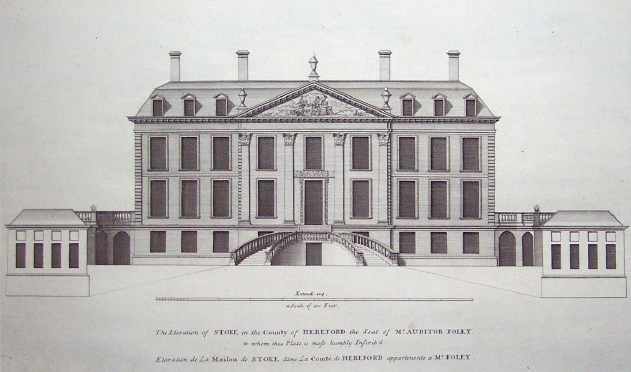
Stoke Edith

He was the eldest son of Hon. Edward Foley and his wife Eliza Maria Foley Hodgetts and elder brother of John Hodgetts Hodgetts-Foley and inherited the Stoke Edith estate from his father in 1803. He was educated at Brasenose College, Oxford (1809) and appointed High Sheriff of Herefordshire for 1815–16.

Foley was one of the Members of Parliament (MP) for Ludgershall from 1826 to 1832 and for Herefordshire from 1832 to 1841.

== Family ==
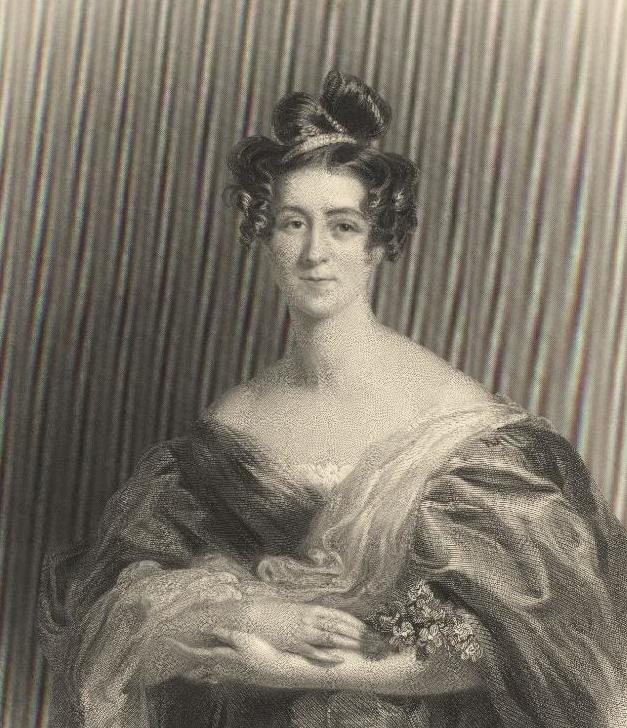
Lady Emily Graham, daughter of 3rd Duke of Montrose

He married in 1832 Lady Emily Graham daughter of James Graham, 3rd Duke of Montrose, but died childless in 1846. His widow survived him until 1901. Foley's will enabled his widow to dispose of the Stoke Edith estate as she wished, but she declined to use that power, enabling her husband's great nephew Paul Henry Foley of Prestwood, Staffordshire, the grandson of John Hodgetts Hodgetts-Foley (her husband's brother), to inherit the estate.

== See also ==
- Foley v Hill

Parliament of the United Kingdom
Preceded by Sandford Graham; Earl of Brecknock	Member of Parliament for Ludgershall; 1826 –1832; With: George Agar-Ellis 1826–1830; Sir Sandford Graham 1830 –1832	Constituency abolished
Preceded by Sir Robert Price, Bt; Kedgwin Hoskins	Member of Parliament for Herefordshire; 1832–1841; With: Sir Robert Price, Bt; Kedgwin Hoskins	Succeeded by Kedgwin Hoskins; Thomas Baskerville; Joseph Bailey
