= William Walter (MP for Peterborough) =

Sir William Walter (about Jan. 1574–1632), of Wimbledon, Surrey, was an English Member of Parliament (MP).

He was a Member of the Parliament of England for Lichfield in 1628, for Peterborough in 1614 and for Ludgershall in 1628.
