= Joseph Bailey (Sudbury MP) =

British politician

Joseph Bailey (9 February 1812 – 31 August 1850), was a British Conservative Party politician. He was a member of parliament (MP) for Sudbury from 1837 to 1841, and for Herefordshire from 1841 to 1850.

His father was Sir Joseph Bailey, 1st Baronet, and his wife Maria (née Latham). He married Elizabeth Mary Russell (died 1897), daughter of William Congreve Russell, in 1839.

Parliament of the United Kingdom
Preceded by Sir James Hamilton, Bt; Sir Edward Barnes	Member of Parliament for Sudbury; 1837–1841; With: Sir Edward Barnes to 1838; Sir John Walsh 1838–1840; George Tomline 1840–1841	Succeeded by Frederick Villiers Meynell; David Ochterlony Dyce Sombre
Preceded by Sir Robert Price, Bt; Kedgwin Hoskins; Edward Thomas Foley	Member of Parliament for Herefordshire; 1841–1850; With: Kedgwin Hoskins to 1847; Thomas Baskerville 1841–1847; Francis Wegg-Prosser from 1847; George Cornewall Lewis from 1847	Succeeded by Thomas William Booker-Blakemore; Francis Wegg-Prosser; George Cornewall Lewis
