= Arthur Allen (died 1558) =

English politician

Arthur Allen (by 1509 – 1557/58), of Wantage, Berkshire, was an English politician.

He was a member (MP) of the parliament of England for Ludgershall in November 1554.
