= Edward Thornborough =

16th-century English politician

Edward Thornborough (born c. 1563) was an English politician from Shoddesden.

He was a member (MP) of the parliament of England for Ludgershall in 1593.
