= Kedgwin Hoskins =

British politician

Member of Parliament for Herefordshire
- In office 7 May 1831 – 4 August 1847 Serving with Joseph Bailey (1841–1847); Thomas Baskerville Mynors Baskerville (1841–1847); Edward Thomas Foley (1832–1841); Robert Price (1831–1841)
- Preceded by: Robert Price; John Cotterell
- Succeeded by: Joseph Bailey; George Cornewall Lewis; Francis Haggitt

Personal details
- Born: 26 May 1777
- Died: 24 December 1852 (aged 75)
- Party: Whig

Kedgwin Hoskins (26 May 1777 – 24 December 1852) was a British Whig politician.

Hoskins was elected Whig Member of Parliament for Herefordshire at the 1831 general election, and held the seat until 1847 when he did not seek re-election.

Parliament of the United Kingdom
Preceded by Robert Price; John Cotterell	Member of Parliament for Herefordshire; 1831–1847; With: Joseph Bailey (1841–1847); Thomas Baskerville Mynors Baskerville (1841–1847); Edward Thomas Foley (1832–1841); Robert Price (1831–1841)	Succeeded by Joseph Bailey; George Cornewall Lewis; Francis Haggitt
