= Ludgershall (constituency) =

Former parliamentary constituency in the United Kingdom

- Former borough constituency for the House of Commons

1295–1832
- Seats: Two

Ludgershall was a parliamentary borough in Wiltshire, England, which elected two Members of Parliament (MPs) to the House of Commons from 1295 until 1832, when the borough was abolished by the Great Reform Act.

Ludgershall is a town 16 miles (26 km) north-east of Salisbury. The population was 535 in 1831.

== Members of Parliament ==
=== 1295–1640 ===
Parliament	First member	Second member
1421 (Dec)	John Denby	William Bishop
1422	John Seymour	
1432	William Ludlowe	
1433	William Ludlowe	
1436	William Ludlowe	John of Coombe
1437	William Ludlowe	John of Coombe
1450–1451	John Erley	Thomas Thorpe
1453	William Ludlowe	
1455	William Ludlowe	
1491	Robert Lytton	
1510–1515	No names known	
1523	?Henry Brydges	?Richard Brydges
1529	Henry Brydges	Richard Brydges
1536	?Henry Brydges	?Richard Brydges
1539	?	
1542	?	
1545	John Knight	Thomas Hawes
1547	William Turner	Ralph Cockerell
1553 (Mar)	Humphrey Cavell	?
1553 (Oct)	Richard Brydges	Edmund Powell
1554 (Apr)	John Winchcombe	Edmund Powell
1554 (Nov)	Sir John Price	Arthur Allen
1555	John Story	John Winchcombe
1558	Sir Richard Brydges	Thomas Martin
1559	William Wightman	Henry Sharington
1562–3	Griffin Curteys	George Cope
1571	Christopher Wray	James Colbrand
1572	James Colbrand	Thomas Walkeden
1584	John Kingsmill	Francis Button
1586	Ambrose Coppinger	John Kingsmill
1588	Carew Raleigh	Henry Hyde
1593	Edward Thornborough	Chidiock Wardour
1597	Edmund Ludlow	Richard Leake
1601	Robert Penruddocke	James Kirton
1604–1611	James Kirton	Henry Ludlow
1614	Charles Danvers	James Kirton
1621–1622	Alexander Chocke	William Sotwell
1624	Edward Kyrton	William Sotwell
1625	Robert Pye	Sir Thomas Hinton
1626	Sir William Walter	Sir Thomas Jaye/Sir Thomas Hinton; Unresolved double return
1628	John Selden	Sir Thomas Lay
1629–1640	No Parliament convened	

=== 1640–1832 ===
Year	First member	First party	Second member	Second party
November 1640	William Ashburnham	Royalist	Sir John Evelyn	Parliamentarian
1642	Walter Long	Parliamentarian	Sir John Evelyn	Parliamentarian
December 1648	Long and Evelyn excluded in Pride's Purge – both seats vacant			
1653	Ludgershall was unrepresented in the Barebones Parliament and the First and Second Parliaments of the Protectorate			
January 1659	James Davy		Richard Sherwyn	
May 1659	Ludgershall was not represented in the restored Rump			
April 1660	William Prynne		William Thomas	
July 1660	Silius Titus		William Thomas	
March 1661	William Ashburnham		Geoffrey Palmer (died October 1661)	
December 1661	William Ashburnham		Sir Richard Browne	
1669	William Ashburnham		Thomas Grey	
1673	William Ashburnham		George Legge	
February 1679	Thomas Neale		John Smith	
August 1679	Thomas Neale		John Garrard	
1681	Thomas Neale		Sir John Talbot	
1685	Thomas Neale		Henry Clerke	
1689	John Smith		John Deane	
1690	Thomas Neale		John Deane	
1695	Thomas Neale		Colonel John Richmond Webb	Tory
1698	Thomas Neale		Walter Kent	
1699	Colonel John Richmond Webb	Tory	Walter Kent	
1701	Colonel John Richmond Webb	Tory	Edmund Richmond Webb	
1705	Thomas Powell		Walter Kent	
1706	Major-General John Richmond Webb	Tory	Walter Kent	
1708	Major-General John Richmond Webb	Tory	Robert Bruce	
1710	Major-General John Richmond Webb	Tory	Major-General Thomas Pearce	
1713	Major-General John Richmond Webb	Tory	Robert Ferne	
1714	John Ward		Robert Ferne	
1715	General John Richmond Webb	Tory	John Ivory-Talbot	
1722	General John Richmond Webb	Tory	Borlase Richmond Webb	
1724	Anthony Cornish		Borlase Richmond Webb	
1727	Charles Boone		Borlase Richmond Webb	
1734	Peter Delmé		Daniel Boone	
1741	Charles Selwyn		Thomas Hayward	
1747	Thomas Farrington		George Augustus Selwyn	
1754	Sir John Bland		Thomas Hayward	
1755	Henry Digby		Thomas Hayward	
1761	Thomas Whately		John Paterson	
1768	Lord Garlies		Sir Peniston Lamb	
January 1774	Whitshed Keene		Sir Peniston Lamb	
October 1774	Lord George Gordon		Sir Peniston Lamb	
1780	George Augustus Selwyn		Sir Peniston Lamb	
1784	George Augustus Selwyn		Nathaniel William Wraxall	
1790	George Augustus Selwyn		Hon. William Assheton Harbord	
1791	Samuel Smith		Hon. William Assheton Harbord	
1793	Nathaniel Newnham	Tory	Hon. William Assheton Harbord	
1796	Earl of Dalkeith	Tory	Thomas Everett	Tory
1804	Magens Dorrien-Magens	Tory	Thomas Everett	Tory
1810	Magens Dorrien-Magens	Tory	Joseph Hague Everett	Tory
1811	Magens Dorrien-Magens	Tory	The Lord Headley	
1812	Magens Dorrien-Magens	Tory	Joseph Hague Everett	Tory
1812	Sandford Graham	Whig	Joseph Birch	Whig
1815	Charles Nicholas Pallmer	Whig	Joseph Birch	Whig
1817	The Earl of Carhampton	Tory	Joseph Birch	Whig
1818	The Earl of Carhampton	Tory	(Sir) Sandford Graham	Whig
1821	Earl of Brecknock	Tory	(Sir) Sandford Graham	Whig
1826	Edward Thomas Foley	Tory	George James Welbore Agar-Ellis	Whig
1830	Edward Thomas Foley	Tory	Sir Sandford Graham	Whig
1832	Constituency abolished			

== Sources ==
- Robert Beatson, A Chronological Register of Both Houses of Parliament (London: Longman, Hurst, Res & Orme, 1807)
- Cobbett's Parliamentary history of England, from the Norman Conquest in 1066 to the year 1803 (London: Thomas Hansard, 1808)
- J E Neale, The Elizabethan House of Commons (London: Jonathan Cape, 1949)
- J Holladay Philbin, Parliamentary Representation 1832 – England and Wales (New Haven: Yale University Press, 1965)
- Henry Stooks Smith, "The Parliaments of England from 1715 to 1847" (2nd edition, edited by FWS Craig – Chichester: Parliamentary Reference Publications, 1973)
- Leigh Rayment's Historical List of MPs – Constituencies beginning with "L" (part 4)
