= John Winchcombe (died 1574) =

Member of the Parliament of England

John Winchcombe (by 1519 – 1574), of Bucklebury and Thatcham, Berkshire, was an English Member of Parliament in March 1553 for Reading, April 1554 and 1555 for Ludgershall and for Wootton Bassett in 1571. He was the son of John Winchcombe (died 1557) and his great-great-grandson became the first Winchcombe baronet.
