= Thomas Baskerville Mynors Baskerville =

British politician (1790–1864)

Member of Parliament for Herefordshire
- In office 5 July 1841 – 4 August 1847 Serving with Joseph Bailey; Kedgwin Hoskins
- Preceded by: Edward Thomas Foley; Kedgwin Hoskins; Robert Price
- Succeeded by: Joseph Bailey; Francis Haggitt; George Cornewall Lewis

Personal details
- Born: 9 April 1790
- Died: 9 September 1864 (aged 74)
- Party: Conservative

Thomas Baskerville Mynors Baskerville (9 April 1790 – 9 September 1864) was a British Conservative politician.

Baskerville was elected Conservative Member of Parliament for Herefordshire at the 1841 general election and held the seat until 1847 when he did not seek re-election.

Parliament of the United Kingdom
Preceded by Edward Thomas Foley; Kedgwin Hoskins; Robert Price	Member of Parliament for Herefordshire; 1841–1847; With: Joseph Bailey; Kedgwin Hoskins	Succeeded by Joseph Bailey; Francis Haggitt; George Cornewall Lewis
