= John Richmond Webb (judge) =

John Richmond Webb (1721 – 15 January 1766), of Biddesden in Hampshire, was an English lawyer who served briefly as a member of parliament and as a Welsh judge.

Webb was the eldest son of General John Richmond Webb by his second marriage. He was admitted as a member of Lincoln's Inn in 1739 and was called to the bar in 1745; he became a bencher of his inn in 1762. In 1761 he was elected to Parliament as member for Bossiney, and was a supporter of The Earl of Bute until his death five years later. In December 1764 he was appointed a judge on the Brecon circuit, which Prime Minister Grenville later cited as an example of the favour that the Grenville government showed to Bute's friends.

He had an illegitimate daughter. In 1738 he inherited Biddesden House and its estate, in Ludgershall parish on the Wiltshire-Hampshire border, from his half-brother Borlace Richmond Webb.

He died unmarried, and is buried in the undercroft of Lincoln's Inn Chapel. His estate passed to his sister Frances (d.1777).

Parliament of Great Britain
| Preceded by Edwin Sandys; Edward Wortley Montagu | Member of Parliament for Bossiney; 1761–1766; With: Edward Wortley Montagu | Succeeded by Lord Mount Stuart; Edward Wortley Montagu |
