= John Ivory-Talbot =

English landowner and politician

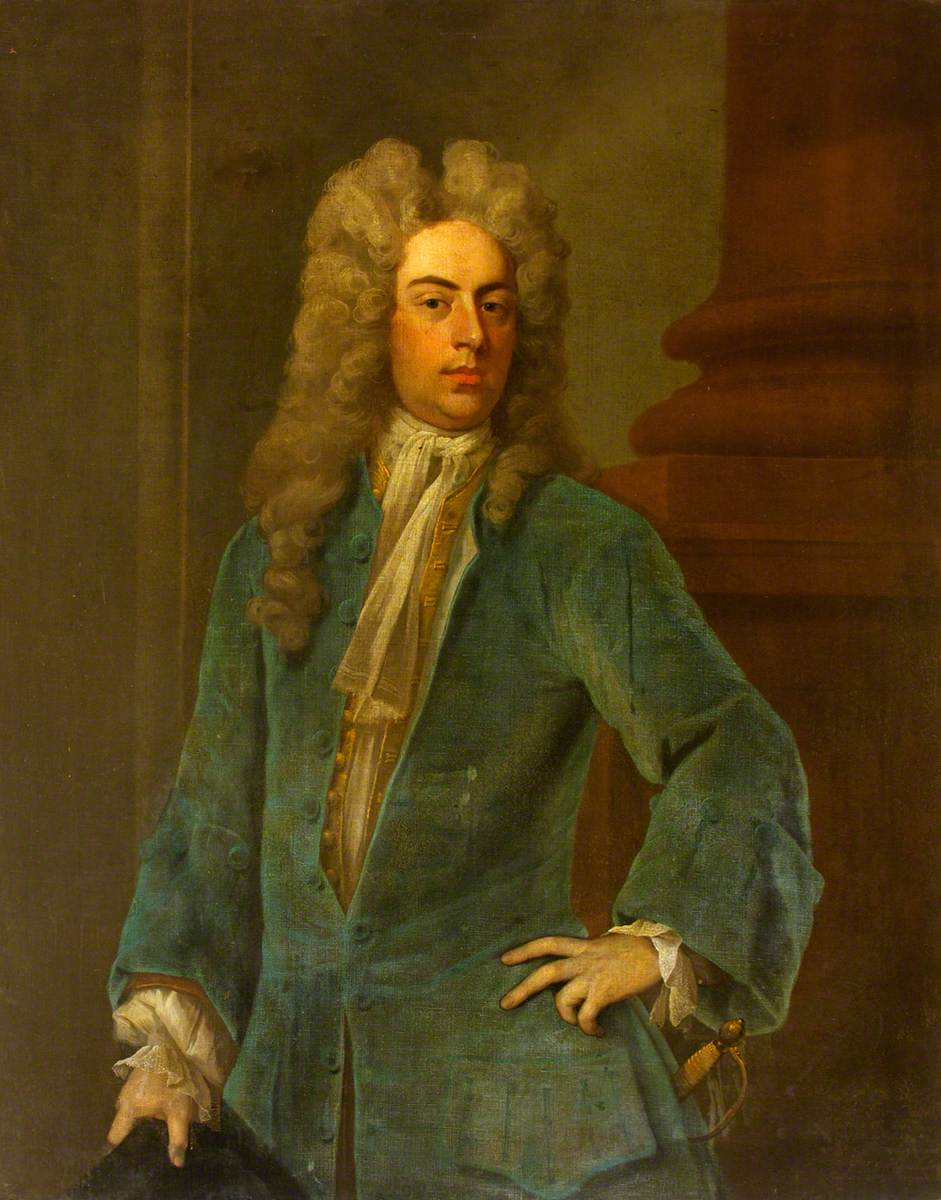
Portrait by Michael Dahl from the National Trust collection at Lacock Abbey

John Ivory-Talbot (c. 1691 – October 1772), of Lacock Abbey, Wiltshire, was an English landowner and politician who sat in the House of Commons between 1715 and 1741.

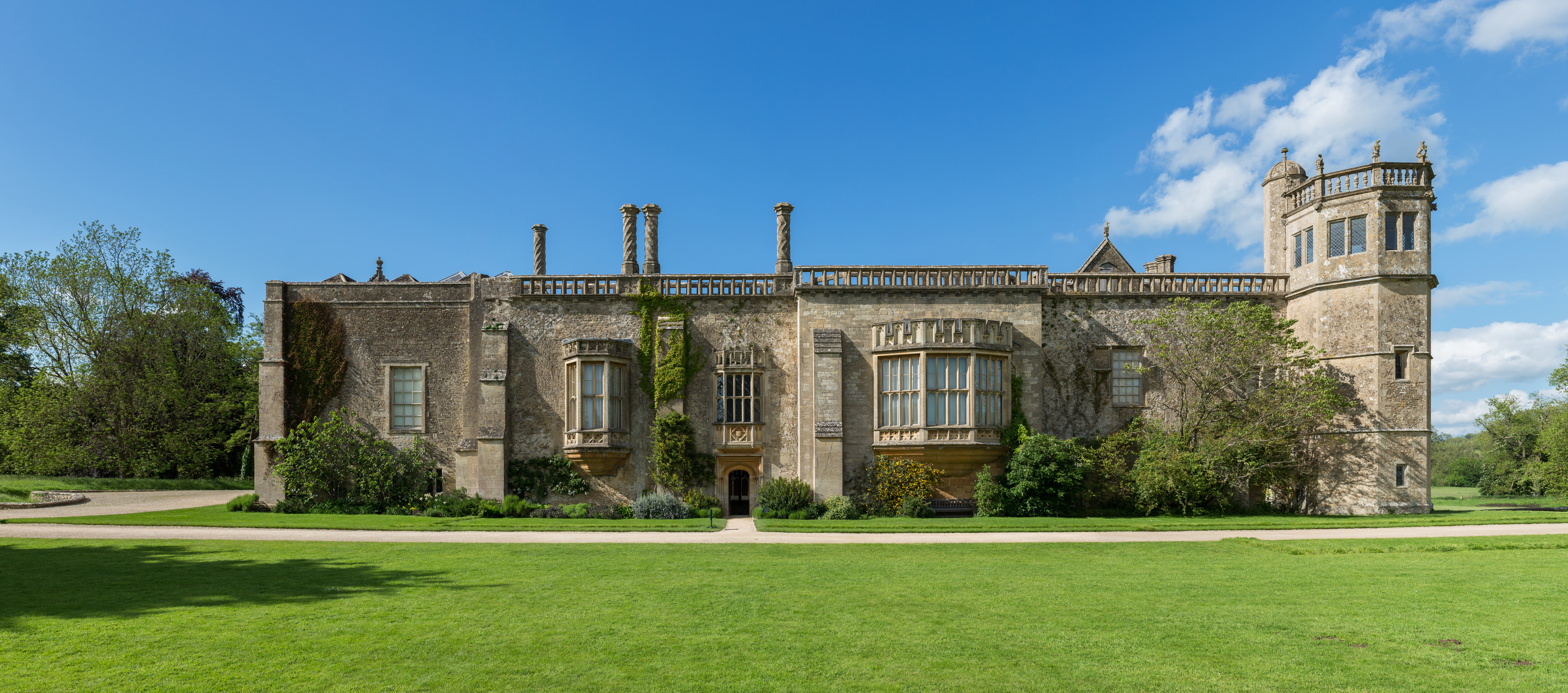
Lacock Abbey, Wiltshire

Ivory was the eldest son of Sir John Ivory of New Ross, County Wexford and his wife Anne Talbot, eldest daughter and coheiress of Sir John Talbot, MP of Lacock Abbey. His father died when he was an infant in 1695. He matriculated at Christ Church, Oxford on 23 April 1707. In 1714, he succeeded to the Wiltshire estates of his grandfather, Sir John Talbot, and assumed the additional name of Talbot. On 1 July 1716 he married Mary Mansel, the daughter of Thomas Mansel, 1st Baron Mansel, MP.

Ivory-Talbot was elected Tory Member of Parliament (MP) for Ludgershall at the 1715 general election and voted consistently against the Government. He did not stand in 1722. At the 1727 general election he was returned unopposed as MP for Wiltshire. He was returned unopposed again at the 1734 general election and made his only known speech on 3 May 1736, against the Quakers title bill. In 1735, his nephew Thomas's mother Lady Mansel objected to Ivory-Talbot being made his sole guardian on the grounds that he was driven to drink because his wife was mad. He did not stand for Parliament in 1741.

Ivory-Talbot made substantial alterations to Lacock Abbey in the Gothic Revival style in the 1750s. He died in October 1772, leaving two sons and a daughter. Lacock Abbey passed to his eldest son John.

Parliament of Great Britain
Preceded by John Ward; Robert Ferne	Member of Parliament for Ludgershall; 1715–1722; With: John Richmond Webb	Succeeded by John Richmond Webb; Borlase Richmond Webb
Preceded by Richard Howe; Richard Goddard	Member of Parliament for Wiltshire; 1727–1741; With: Sir James Long 1727–1729; John Howe 1729–1741	Succeeded by Sir Robert Long; Edward Popham
