= Edmund Powell (MP) =

16th-century English politician

Edmund Powell or Appowell (by 1506 – 1558/1559), of New Windsor, Berkshire and Sandford-on-Thames, Oxfordshire, was an English politician.

He was a member (MP) of the parliament of England for Ludgershall in October 1553 and April 1554; and for Oxfordshire in 1555.
