= Birch baronets =

Extinct baronetcy in the Baronetage of the United Kingdom

- Escutcheon of the Birch baronets of Hasles
- Creation date: 1831
- Status: extinct
- Extinction date: 1880
- Motto: Libertas, Freedom

The Birch Baronetcy, of The Hasles in the County Palatine of Lancaster, was a title in the Baronetage of the United Kingdom. It was created on 30 September 1831 for Joseph Birch, previously Member of Parliament for Nottingham. He was succeeded by his son, Thomas, the second Baronet, who represented Liverpool in Parliament. The title became extinct on the latter's death in 1880.

Thomas Birch, father of the first Baronet, was Mayor of Liverpool in 1777.

== Birch baronets, of Hasles (1831) ==
- Sir Joseph Birch, 1st Baronet (1755–1833)
- Sir Thomas Bernard Birch, 2nd Baronet (1791–1880). He had no children.

Baronetage of the United Kingdom
Preceded by Barrington baronets	Birch baronets of Hasles; 30 September 1831	Succeeded by Brinckman baronets
