= Konstantinos Minas =

Konstantinos Minas (Greek: Κωνσταντίνος Μηνάς; died 1859) was a manuscript collector and dealer from the Ottoman Empire. He spent much of his life in France, and after the Greek War of Independence undertook commissions in the Levant.

== Early life ==
According to the Encyclopædia Britannica 1911, which names him as "Minas [Minoïdes]", he was born in Macedonia; in an official statement he made in 1840, his place of birth was given as Voltia, in the province of Salonica, "en Grèce", on 1 December 1788. Omont also mentions 1798 as a possible date of birth. A source places Voltia near what is now Thessaloniki.

Minas was a pupil of Athanasios Parios, and became a teacher of philosophy and rhetoric. He was teaching at Serres on the outbreak of the Greek insurgency.

== In France ==
Minas arrived at Marseille in August 1819, and in 1822 in Paris was authorised to teach Ancient Greek language and literature. He took part in the Philhellenic Committee of Paris, founded in 1821.

In 1829 Minas failed in his attempt to succeed Jean-Baptiste Gail in the chair of Greek at the Collège de France, which went to Jean François Boissonade de Fontarabie. He began in 1831 to work under Carl Benedict Hase on Greek manuscripts, at the Bibliothèque royale.

== The three missions ==
Narcisse-Achille de Salvandy, or Abel-François Villemain, his successor as French education minister in 1839, sent Minas on a mission to find Greek manuscripts. This was the first of three such missions, undertaken in the period 1840 to 1855.

Minas found in 1840 a manuscript of the Gymnasticus of Philostratus, published in Paris in 1858. At Mount Athos in 1842 he found a manuscript of Babrius (now called the Athonite MS). Its publication in 1844, edited by Boissonade from a copy made by Minas, was a scholarly sensation: Babrius, an author in Greek verse of fables of the type of the Aesopica, was then known only sparsely, with a few fragments published in 1816 by Franz Xaver Berger.

The second mission was a matter of months, in late 1844 and early 1845, to Trabzon, Sumela Monastery and Gümüşhane. Minas made many monastery visits, and returned via Constantinople. He was made a chevalier of the Légion d'honneur in 1846. In 1847 he was given rights of domicile in France. That year, he received a proposal from James Yates that he should sell his manuscript collection to a British buyer.

The third mission, begun in May 1850 with a brief and itinerary drawn up by Philippe Le Bas, was intended to last eight months. It did not go as planned, and Minas was absent from France for five years.

== Death and legacy ==
Minas returned to Paris during November 1855, where he lived in straitened circumstances. He died there on 30 December 1859.

With money owing to creditors, a sale was arranged in 1860 of manuscripts that Minas had collected, a catalogue being compiled of 80 of them. But on the eve of the sale, an official intervention seized them. They went initially to the Bibliothèque Mazarine.

A legal settlement of the estate was made. In 1864, the Bibliothèque nationale de France acquired the manuscript collection of Minas.

== Reputation ==
Both during his lifetime, and markedly in the decades after his death, the conduct of Minas was criticised. Points raised relate to how he obtained manuscripts and then allowed access to them; how he collated materials without detailed provenance; and the attribution of copies.

=== Standards ===
The manuscripts Minas took away from Mount Athos are now described as "bought or stolen". He gained a reputation during his lifetime for sharp practice, and possible smuggling, in his manuscript hunting. Stories of his conduct on Mount Athos may, though, involve confusion with the forger Constantine Simonides.

Joseph-Michel Guardia wrote an extended review in 1858 of the editions of the Philostratus work by Minas and by Charles Victor Daremberg. He put emphasis on the secretive conduct of Minas.

=== Minas and the "pseudo-Babrius" affair ===
After his death suspicions of forgery or fraud by Minas relating to some alleged manuscript copies of Babrius were widely accepted. Modern scholarship labels some post-1850 Babrius material purportedly copied by Minas as by "pseudo-Babrius". George Cornewall Lewis advised the British Museum in London to purchase such pseudo-Babrius texts. The texts involved are now known as manuscript L.

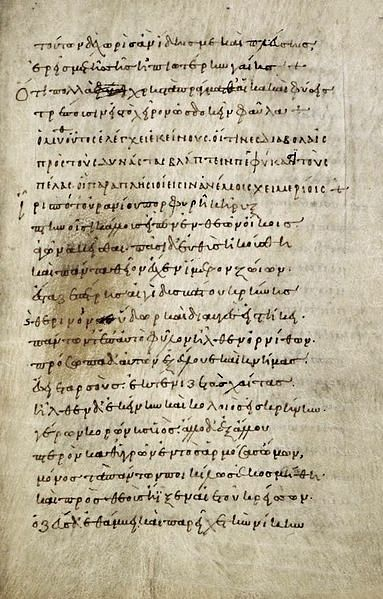
Page from the British Library's manuscript of fables by Babrius

An account of the 1857 transaction between Minas and the British Museum was given by the Marquis de Queux de Saint-Hilaire, in an obituary of George Wyndham (1813–1875), a British Hellenist who had been a pupil of Minas in Paris in the 1820s. Wyndham acted as interpreter for Minas in London. In his account as related by the Marquis, the main transaction was the purchase of the codex from Minas, which was the original of the Boissonade edition (made from a copy by Minas).

Babrius, a poet of the Second Sophistic, was in his own period a successful pedagogic author. Minas had already shown the contentious material in France to Johann Friedrich Dübner and Émile Egger, among others. Lewis was aware that the "pseudo-Babrius" material was not of comparable quality to the codex, but it was bought from Minas also, for a small sum. Lewis then published it, "for what it was worth".

Lewis's 1859 edition was entitled Babrii Fabulae Aesopeae: e codice manuscripto partem secundam. It was widely rejected, as giving credibility to the authorship of Babrius, when internal evidence told strongly against: Lewis died in 1863. Carel Gabriel Cobet and Dübner condemned the manuscript L papers as forgery; there was some dissent at the time, from Hermann Sauppe and Theodor Bergk. John Conington wrote that he was convinced against the material by the earlier critical approach of Karl Lachmann.

=== Davies and Eberhard ===
James Davies, a friend of Lewis, published in 1860 a metrical translation in English of Babrius, from Lewis's text, including fables from the "pseudo-Babrius" manuscript L. He later wrote an 1874 review The Greek Fool in Blackwood's Magazine, in which he called Minas "a Greek well known to European libraries and museums as a manuscript hunter of somewhat unreliable habits and antecedents". He cited also the opinion of Alfred Eberhard, whose edition of the Philogelos he was reviewing, in Latin: "homo Graecus tot libris inventis, corruptis, ablatis, subditis celeber" (He was a Greek who was famous for the number of books he discovered, destroyed, stole, and concealed). Eberhard used a joke manuscript compiled by Minas, but complained that it gave no provenance for the jokes.

=== 20th century scholarship ===
By the time Wilfrid Oldaker wrote on Babrius in 1934, the consensus position was that Minas had forged part of the text given to Boissonade (completion of fable 123); and manuscript L. British Library Add MS 22807 is described as "Brought by Menas Menoides from Mount Athos, possibly from the Lavra Monastery." Manuscript L is identified as Add MS 22808.

== Works ==
- Orthophonie grecque ou traité de l'accentuation et de la quantité syllabique (1824)
- Calliope; ou, Traité sur la véritable prononciation de la langue grecque (1825)
- Théorie de la grammaire et de la langue grecque (1827)
- Grammaire grecque contenant les dialectes et la différence avec le grec vulgaire (1828)
- Καναρις, ̓ͅασμα Πινδαρικον (1830). Pindaric ode addressed to Konstantinos Kanaris.
- L'Art de la rhétorique par Aristote (1837), translator. Minas had worked with Étienne Gros on a French translation (1820) of Thomas Gaisford's edition of the Rhetoric of Aristotle.
- Epitres de St-Paul (1838), translator
- Dialectique de Galien (1844), edition of a contribution of Galen to logic, from a manuscript from Mount Athos, published through Villemain
- Φαρμακίδου Αντίδοτον (1852, Athens and Constantinople), pseudonymous
