= John Richmond Webb =

British army officer and politician (1667–1724)

c. 1700–1720 portrait of Webb by Christian Richter

General John Richmond Webb (26 December 1667 – 5 September 1724) was a British army officer and Tory politician who sat in the English and British House of Commons from 1695 to 1724. Politically he was a Hanoverian Tory who supported the Hanoverian Succession rather than the rival Jacobite movement.

== Early life ==
Webb was the son of Colonel Edmund Richmond Webb, a Wiltshire gentleman with a position in the household of Prince George of Denmark and second cousin to another Wiltshire man, Henry St John, who became the Tory leader in Parliament during the reign of Queen Anne. Webb was commissioned as a Cornet of Dragoons in 1687. The following year he served in the Glorious Revolution campaign. While serving under Patrick Sarsfield at the Wincanton Skirmish, he was badly wounded by the Dutch.

On 3 February 1690 Webb married Henrietta Borlase, daughter of William Borlase MP and Joanna Bancks. In 1692 or 1693, possibly using the wealth he acquired by his marriage, he purchased Biddesden House at Ludgershall in Wiltshire, an estate which carried with it the decisive electoral influence over the pocket borough of the same name.

== Political and military careers ==
Webb entered Parliament in 1695 for Ludgershall as a Tory, and became a close political follower of St John. In the same year, he was promoted to Colonel of Princess Anne of Denmark's Regiment of Foot in 1695. In September 1697, he was dangerously injured in a duel. The following year he briefly lost his seat in Parliament, but his defeat at Ludgershall was overturned on petition. He served in Flanders in the campaign of 1702–1703, was a Brigadier at the Battle of Blenheim, and a Major-General at Ramillies and Oudenarde.

In September 1708, commanding the British troops at the Battle of Wijnendale, he succeeded in protecting a convoy from superior French forces and delivering supplies to the besiegers of Lille, which led eventually to the town's capture; but opponents of the army commander, Marlborough, accused him of giving the credit in his initial dispatch to Webb's Whig subordinate, William Cadogan, for political reasons. Webb subsequently received full credit and the thanks of Parliament for the action, and the following year he was promoted to Lieutenant-General. Nevertheless, from this point onwards Webb became the centre of Tory agitation against Marlborough.

In 1709, Webb served at the Battle of Malplaquet, where he was severely wounded; he was awarded a substantial pension and returned to England, seeing no further active service. In 1710 he was appointed Governor of the Isle of Wight, a military post which among other advantages gave substantial influence in choosing the Members of Parliament who sat for the island's three boroughs; he took advantage of this by sitting as MP for Newport, a constituency traditionally represented by at least one distinguished military or naval figure, from 1713 to 1715. Furthermore, in 1712 he was promoted to General, and appointed commander of land forces in Great Britain. However, together with the other Tories, he was dismissed from his offices following the accession of George I. Unable to expect re-election at Newport under the new Governor, his old rival Cadogan, he was forced once more to fall back on the family seat at Ludgershall, which he represented again from 1715 until his death.

== Biddesden House ==
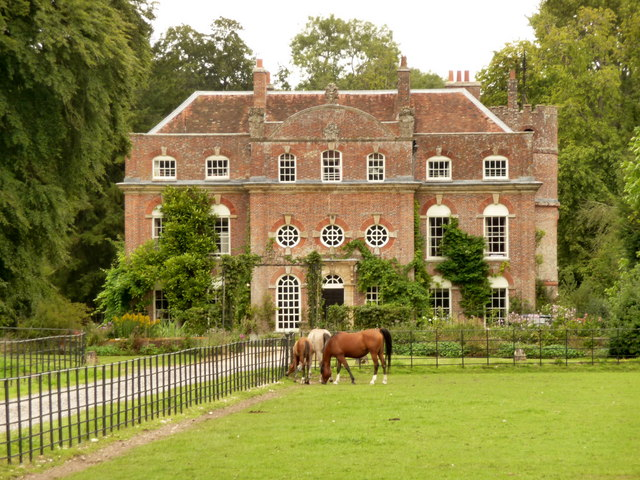
Biddesden House in 2009

Webb replaced the manor house at Biddesden with a large house in brick with stone dressings, built in stages around 1711–1712. Biddesden House has a castellated round turret, built to carry a bell brought from Lille. The architect is unknown, perhaps Webb himself. The house stands in parkland and is Grade I listed.

== Death and legacy ==
Webb died on 5 September 1724. He left his estates (which he had enlarged by buying further land in Ludgershall parish) to his second son Borlase Richmond Webb (c. 1696–1738), to the exclusion of his eldest son Edmund. His eldest son by his second wife, also named John Richmond Webb (1721–1766), was a lawyer, and briefly a judge and Member of Parliament.

Webb's brother Thomas Richmond Webb was an ancestor of the novelist William Makepeace Thackeray, and Webb is sympathetically depicted in Thackeray's historical novel The History of Henry Esmond

Parliament of England
Preceded by Thomas Neale; John Deane	Member of Parliament for Ludgershall; 1695–1698; With: Thomas Neale	Succeeded by Thomas Neale; Walter Kent
Preceded by Thomas Neale; Walter Kent	Member of Parliament for Ludgershall; 1699–1705; With: Walter Kent 1699–1701; Edmund Richmond Webb 1701–1705	Succeeded by Thomas Powell; Walter Kent
Preceded by Thomas Powell; Walter Kent	Member of Parliament for Ludgershall; 1706–1707; With: Walter Kent	Succeeded by Parliament of Great Britain
Parliament of Great Britain
Preceded by Parliament of England	Member of Parliament for Ludgershall; 1707–1713; With: Walter Kent 1707–1708; Robert Bruce 1708–1710; Thomas Pearce 1710–1713	Succeeded by John Ward; Robert Ferne
Preceded by William Stephens; William Seymour	Member of Parliament for Newport (Isle of Wight); 1713–1715; With: William Stephens	Succeeded by William Stephens; Anthony Morgan
Preceded by John Ward; Robert Ferne	Member of Parliament for Ludgershall; 1715–1724; With: John Ivory Talbot 1715–1722; Borlase Richmond Webb 1722–1724	Succeeded by Borlase Richmond Webb; Anthony Cornish
Honorary titles
Preceded by The 2nd Duke of Bolton	Vice-Admiral of Hampshire; 1710–1714	Succeeded by The 2nd Duke of Bolton
Preceded by The 2nd Duke of Bolton	Governor of the Isle of Wight; 1710–1715	Succeeded by William Cadogan
Military offices
Preceded by John Beaumont	Colonel of Princess Anne of Denmark's Regiment of Foot; 1695–1715	Succeeded by Henry Morrison
