= Johan Richter (painter) =

Swedish-Italian painter (1665–1745)

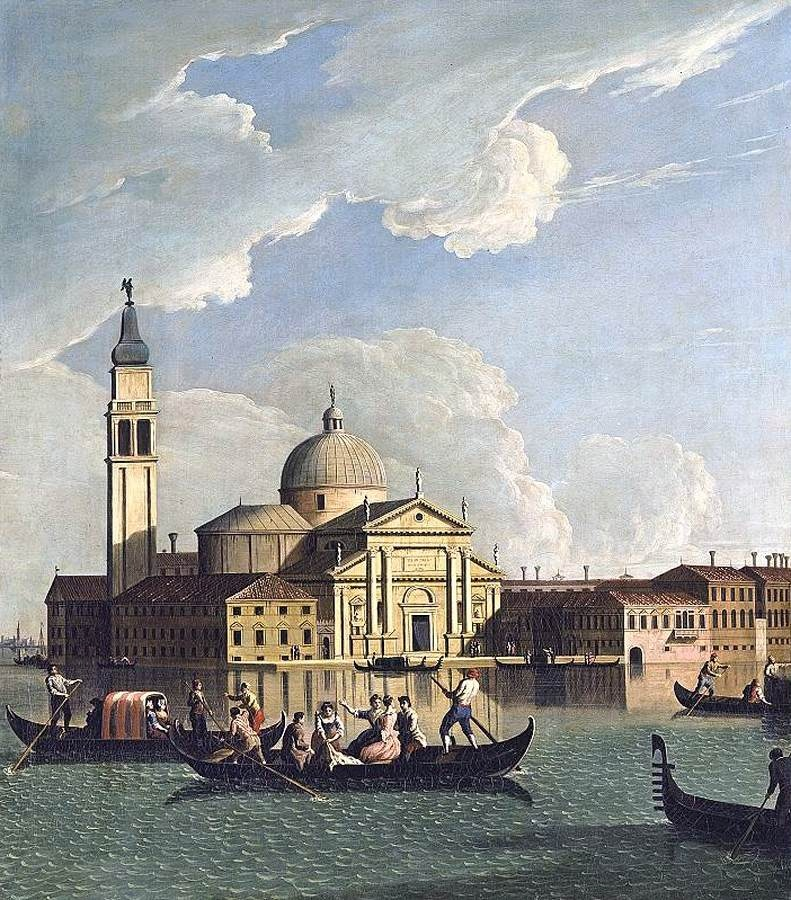
View of San Giorgio Maggiore by Richter

Johan Richter or Giovanni Richter (1665–1745) was a Swedish Baroque painter.

== Biography ==
Richter was born in Stockholm, Sweden. His brothers included medallist Bengt Richter (1670–1735). He mainly painted landscapes or veduta of Venice. Around 1710 he traveled to Venice, where he was mentioned as active from 1717. His work was influenced by Italian painter Luca Carlevarijs (1663–1730). He died during 1745 in Venice.
