= George Cornewall Lewis =

British politician (1806–1863)

The Right Honourable Sir George Cornewall Lewis Bt
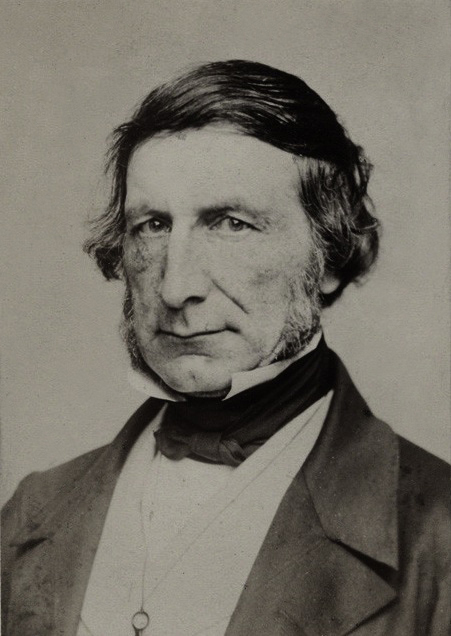
- Lewis, c. 1860–63

Chancellor of the Exchequer
- In office 28 February 1855 – 21 February 1858
- Monarch: Victoria
- Prime Minister: The Viscount Palmerston
- Preceded by: William Ewart Gladstone
- Succeeded by: Benjamin Disraeli

Home Secretary
- In office 18 June 1859 – 25 July 1861
- Monarch: Victoria
- Prime Minister: The Viscount Palmerston
- Preceded by: Thomas H. Sotheron-Estcourt
- Succeeded by: Sir George Grey, Bt

Secretary of State for War
- In office 23 July 1861 – 13 April 1863
- Monarch: Victoria
- Prime Minister: The Viscount Palmerston
- Preceded by: Sidney Herbert
- Succeeded by: The Earl de Grey and Ripon

Personal details
- Born: 21 April 1806 London, Middlesex, England
- Died: 13 April 1863 (aged 56)
- Party: Liberal, Whig
- Spouse: Lady Maria Theresa Villiers (m. 1844)
- Education: Christ Church, Oxford

Sir George Cornewall Lewis, 2nd Baronet, PC (21 April 1806 – 13 April 1863) was a British statesman and man of letters. He is best known for preserving neutrality in 1862 when the British cabinet debated intervention in the American Civil War.

== Early life ==
He was born in London, the son of Thomas Frankland Lewis of Harpton Court, Radnorshire and his wife Harriet Cornewall, daughter of the banker and plantation owner Sir George Cornewall, 2nd Baronet and his wife Catherine Cornewall, daughter of Velters Cornewall.

Lewis was educated at Eton College and matriculated in 1824 at Christ Church, Oxford, where in 1828 he earned a first-class in classics and a second-class in mathematics. He then entered the Middle Temple, studying under Barnes Peacock. He was called to the bar in 1831, and briefly from November 1831 went the Oxford circuit. But he shortly gave up on a career in the law, for health reasons. He assisted Connop Thirlwall and Julius Charles Hare in starting The Philological Museum, a journal published from 1831 to 1833. Its successor was The Classical Museum, which he also supported.

== Commissioner ==
Nassau Senior in 1832 recommended Lewis to Henry Brougham as a candidate for the Poor Law Commission then under consideration. At the time there was no outcome. In 1833 Lewis took on his first public role as one of the commissioners to inquire into the condition of poor Irish across the United Kingdom of Great Britain and Ireland. In 1834 Lord Althorp included him in the commission to inquire into the state of church property and church affairs in Ireland. In the short-lived London Review of 1835–6 edited by John Stuart Mill, a doctrinaire article on the Church of Ireland by Mill himself, influenced by the line of his father James Mill, was followed in the next number by one from Lewis described by Thomas as "highly factual, tolerant, open-minded and practical."

In 1836, at the request of Charles Grant, 1st Baron Glenelg, Lewis accompanied John and Sarah Austin to Malta. They spent nearly two years reporting on the condition of the island and framing a new code of laws. One main object of both commissioners was to associate the Maltese in the responsible government of the island. On his return to Britain, Lewis succeeded his father as one of the principal poor-law commissioners.

== Government positions ==
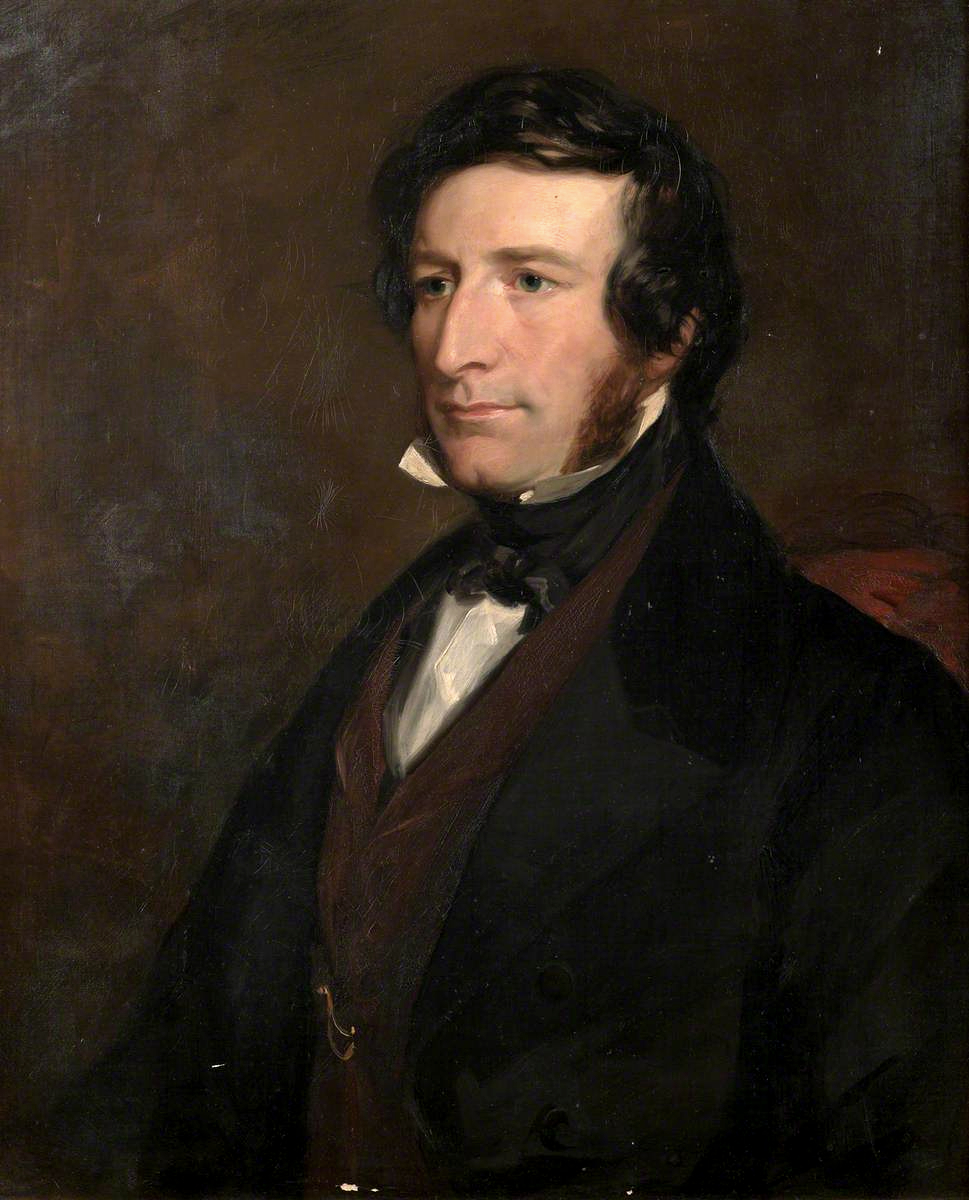
Portrait by Francis Grant, 1849

The enquiry into the Andover workhouse scandal of 1845 damaged the reputation of Lewis, when Edwin Chadwick laid abuses of the Poor Law system at the door of Lewis, his ally Sir Edmund Head, and the cosy relationship they had with Sir James Graham. In 1847 the Poor Law Commission was effectively closed down, under a cloud.

Lewis was then returned as Member of Parliament for Herefordshire, and Lord John Russell appointed him Secretary to the Board of Control. A few months later he became Under-Secretary of State for Home Affairs. There he introduced bills for the abolition of turnpike trusts and the management of highways by a mixed county board, and to define and regulate the parochial assessment.

In 1850 Lewis succeeded William Hayter as Financial Secretary to the Treasury. From 1853 to 1854 he sat on Royal Commission on the City of London.

== Editor ==
On the dissolution of parliament which followed the resignation of Lord John Russell's ministry in 1852, Lewis sought re-election in the 1852 United Kingdom general election. He was defeated for Herefordshire and then for Peterborough. He accepted the editorship of the Edinburgh Review, and remained in the post until 1855. During this period he served on the Oxford commission, and on the commission to inquire into the government of London.

== Return to government ==
In 1855 Lewis succeeded his father in the baronetcy, and was elected member for the Radnor Boroughs, and Lord Palmerston made him Chancellor of the Exchequer. He became responsible for the financing of the Crimean War.

After the change of ministry in 1859 Lewis became Home Secretary under Lord Palmerston, and in 1861, against his wish, he succeeded Sidney Herbert at the War Office. In that role he successfully argued against Russell's call for British mediation in the American Civil War in the autumn of 1862. In Cabinet, William Gladstone, Russell and Palmerston favoured the Confederacy. They worried about race war in the United States, and wanted to restore the supply of cotton for the Lancashire textile industry. Lewis opposed, warning of the risks to British interests. His views finally prevailed and the British remained a neutral throughout the Civil War.

== Death ==
Lewis fell ill and shortly died, on 13 April 1863, at Harpton Court. He was buried in Old Radnor church on the 17th. Historian Richard Shannon has argued that, had Lewis lived longer, he and not William Ewart Gladstone might have come to lead the Liberal Party. D. A. Smith, writing in the Oxford Dictionary of National Biography, does not accept that, though saying he would have had a role to play.

== Works ==
A major early work by Lewis was Remarks on the Use and Abuse of some Political Terms (London, 1832), written under the influence of John Austin. In Local Disturbances in Ireland, and the Irish Church Question (London, 1836), he condemned the existing connection between church and state, proposed a state provision for the Catholic clergy, and maintained the necessity of an efficient workhouse organization. It contains a detailed analysis of rural violence in Ireland. The Essay on the Government of Dependencies (1841) was a systematic statement and discussion of the relations in which colonies may stand towards the mother country. About 1850, his Essay on the Influence of Authority in Matters of Opinion was published.

Before leaving college Lewis published observations on Richard Whately's doctrine of the predicables. In 1835 he published an Essay on the Origin and Formation of the Romance Languages (re-edited in 1862), criticism of François Juste Marie Raynouard's theories on Provençal. He also compiled a glossary of provincial words used in Herefordshire and the adjoining counties.

In the 1850s Lewis produced the Treatise on the Methods of Observation and Reasoning in Politics, and the Enquiry into the Credibility of the Early Roman History, in which he attacked the theory of epic lays and other theories on which Barthold Georg Niebuhr's reconstruction of that history was based. In 1859 Lewis published the Essay on Foreign Jurisdiction and the Extradition of Criminals, topical after the Orsini affair and the trial of Simon François Bernard. He advocated the extension of extradition treaties, and condemned the idea of Weltrechtsordnung which Robert von Mohl of Heidelberg had proposed.

Lewis's final works were the Survey of the Astronomy of the Ancients, in which he applied sceptical analysis to the Egyptology of Christian Charles Josias von Bunsen; and the Dialogue on the Best Form of Government, in which, under the name of "Crito", the author points out that there is no one abstract government which is the best possible for all times and places.

He translated August Böckh's Public Economy of Athens and Muller's History of Greek Literature, and he assisted Henry Tufnell in the translation of Müller's Dorians. While his friend Abraham Hayward ran the Law Magazine, he wrote in it frequently on subjects including secondary punishments and the penitentiary system.

In 1846 Lewis edited a text of the Fables of Babrius. This venture into scholarship soured when he advised the British Museum on a purchase of manuscript copies by Konstantinos Minas (also known as Constantin Minadi, or Minoïde Mynas). When Lewis published in 1859 further fables, there was an outcry across Europe that he had validated what were forgeries. This (?) is no longer the accepted view.

== Associations ==
Lewis's large circle of friends included Edmund Walker Head, George and Harriet Grote, the Austins, Lord Stanhope, John Stuart Mill, Henry Hart Milman, and the Duff Gordons. In public life he was described by Lord Aberdeen as notable "for candour, moderation, love of truth". According to Geoffrey Madan, although invited by Queen Victoria each year to stay at Balmoral, he never accepted.

== Legacy ==
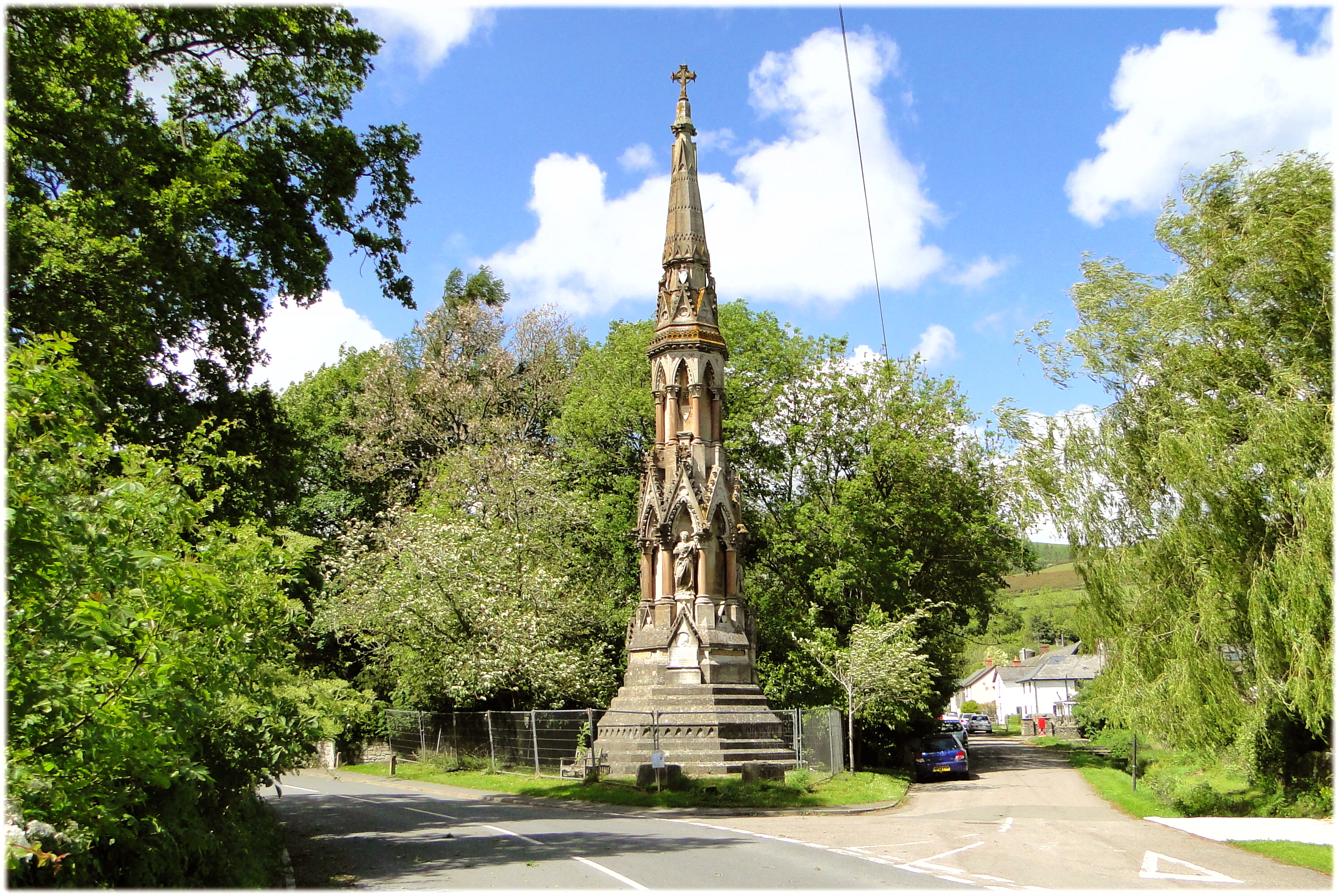
Monument near New Radnor

A marble bust of Lewis, by Henry Weekes, stands in Westminster Abbey. A large monument was built in his memory in the small village of New Radnor, Powys and still stands today, as does a statue in front of the Shirehall, Hereford.

== Family ==
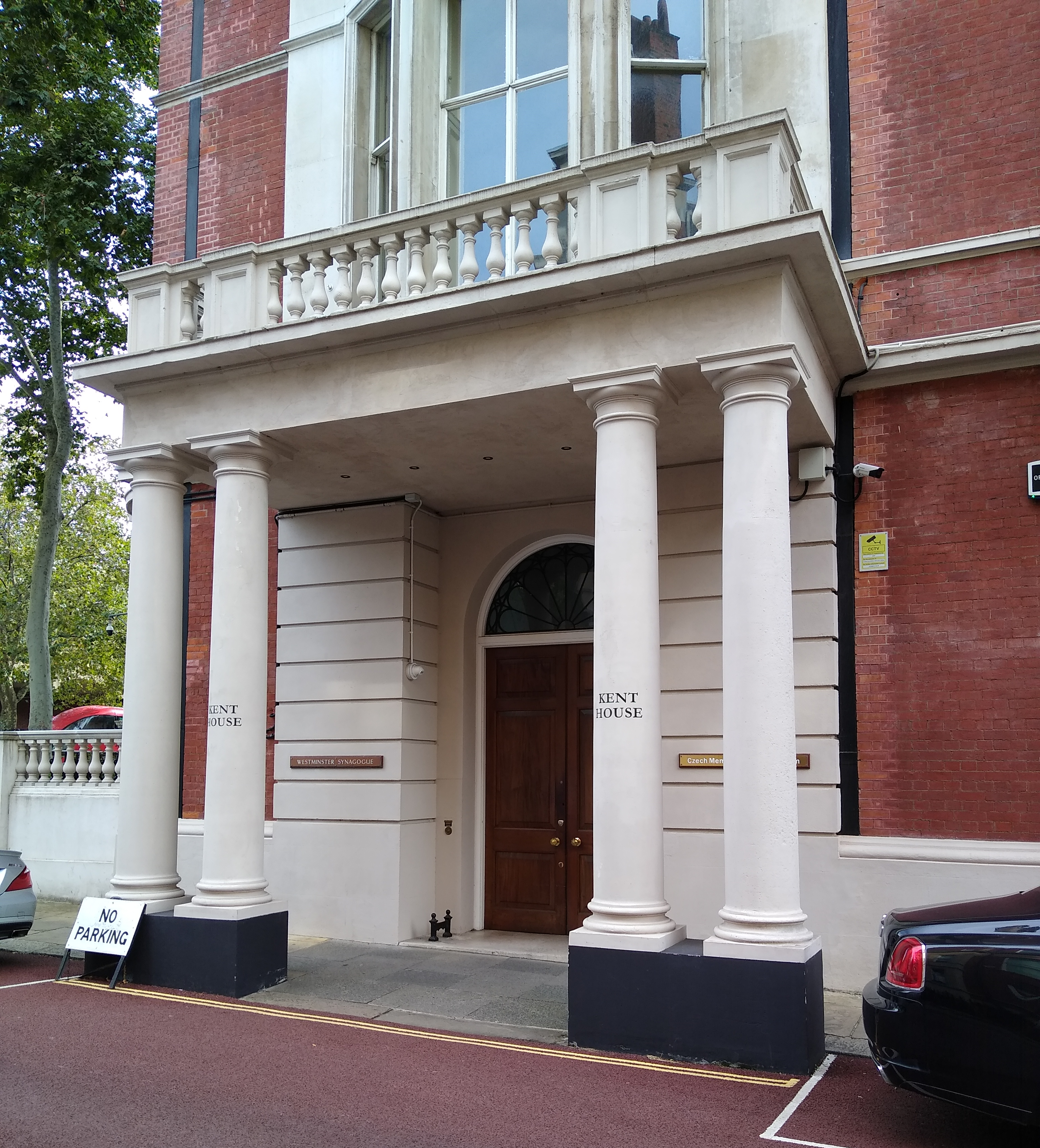
Kent House, Knightsbridge

In 1844 Lewis married the biographer Lady Maria Theresa Villiers. She was a daughter of George Villiers and Theresa Parker and younger sister of George Villiers, 4th Earl of Clarendon; the widow of novelist Thomas Henry Lister, and mother of three children by him. Much of their married life was spent in Kent House, Knightsbridge. They had no children of their own.

Parliament of the United Kingdom
Preceded by Kedgwin Hoskins; Thomas Baskerville; Joseph Bailey	Member of Parliament for Herefordshire; 1847–1852; With: Francis Wegg-Prosser 1847–1852; Joseph Bailey until 1850; Thomas William Booker-Blakemore from 1850	Succeeded by James King King; Charles Kincaid-Lennox; Thomas Booker
Preceded by Sir Thomas Lewis, Bt	Member of Parliament for Radnor; 1855–1863	Succeeded by Richard Green-Price
Political offices
Preceded by George Byng	Joint Secretary to the Board of Control; 1847–1848	Succeeded by James Wilson
Preceded by Sir Denis Le Marchant, Bt	Under-Secretary of State for the Home Department; 1848–1850	Succeeded by Edward Pleydell-Bouverie
Preceded by William Hayter	Financial Secretary to the Treasury; 1850–1852	Succeeded by George Alexander Hamilton
Preceded by William Ewart Gladstone	Chancellor of the Exchequer; 1855–1858	Succeeded by Benjamin Disraeli
Preceded by T. H. S. Sotheron-Estcourt	Home Secretary; 1859–1861	Succeeded by Sir George Grey, Bt.
Preceded by Sidney Herbert	Secretary of State for War; 1861–1863	Succeeded by The Earl De Grey
Baronetage of the United Kingdom
Preceded by Thomas Lewis	Baronet (of Harpton Court); 1855–1863	Succeeded by Gilbert Lewis
