= Babrius =

2nd century Roman Greek writer

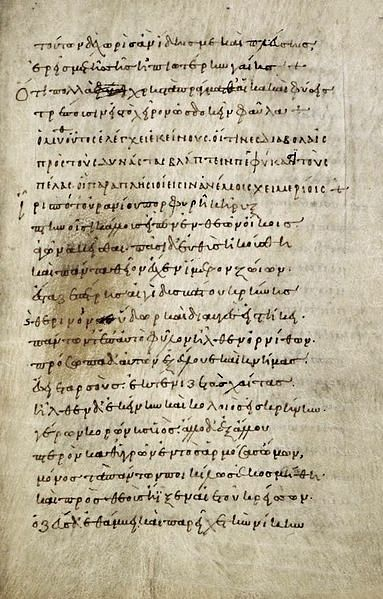
The fables of Babrius

Babrius (Ancient Greek: Βάβριος, Bábrios; fl. c. 200 AD), also known as Babrias (Βαβρίας) or Gabrias (Γαβρίας), was the author of a collection of Greek fables, many of which are known today as Aesop's Fables.

== Life ==
Practically nothing is known of him. He is supposed to have been a Hellenized Roman, whose original name may have been Valerius. He lived in the East, probably in Syria, where the fables seem first to have gained popularity. The address to "a son of King Alexander" has caused much speculation, with the result that dates varying between the 3rd century BC and the 3rd century AD have been assigned to Babrius. The Alexander referred to may have been Alexander Severus (AD 222–235), who was fond of having literary men of all kinds about his court. "The son of Alexander" has further been identified with a certain Branchus mentioned in the fables, and it is suggested that Babrius may have been his tutor; probably, however, Branchus is a purely fictitious name. There is no mention of Babrius in ancient writers before the beginning of the 3rd century AD. As appears from surviving papyrus fragments, his work is to be dated before c. 200 AD (and probably not much earlier, for his language and style seem to show that he belonged to that period).

== Work of Richard Bentley ==
The first critic who made Babrius more than a mere name was Richard Bentley. In a careful examination of these prose Aesopian fables, which had been handed down in various collections from the time of Maximus Planudes, Bentley discovered traces of versification, and was able to extract a number of verses which he assigned to Babrius. Tyrwhitt followed up the researches of Bentley, and for some time the efforts of scholars were directed towards reconstructing the metrical original of the prose fables.

== 1842 find ==
In 1842 the Greek manuscript collector Minoides Mynas came upon a manuscript of Babrius in the convent of Great Lavra on Mount Athos, now in the British Museum. This manuscript contained 123 fables out of the supposed original number, 160. They are arranged alphabetically, but break off at the letter O. The fables are written in choliambic, that is, limping or imperfect iambic verse, having a spondee as the last foot, a meter originally appropriated to scurrilous verse. The style is extremely good, the expression being terse and pointed, the versification correct and elegant, and the construction of the stories is fully equal to that in the prose versions. The genuineness of this collection of the fables was generally admitted by scholars. In 1857, Mynas professed to have discovered at Mount Athos another manuscript containing 94 fables and a preface. As the monks refused to sell this manuscript, he made a copy of it, which was sold to the British Museum, and was published in 1859 by Sir G Cornewall Lewis. This, however, was soon considered to be a forgery. Six more fables were brought to light by P Knoll from a Vatican manuscript edited by A. Eberhard.

== Editions ==
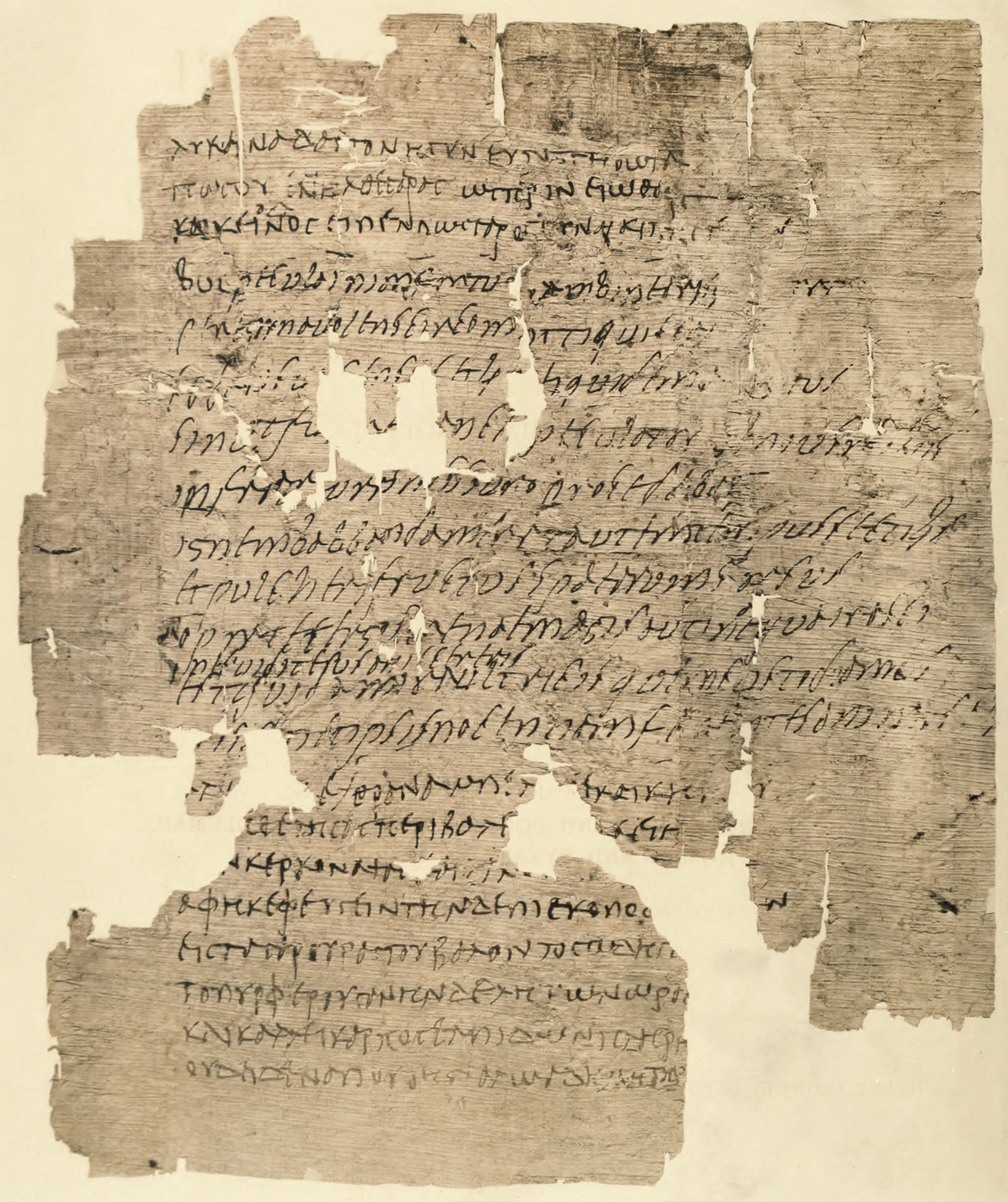
A third- or fourth-century papyrus containing a text of Babrius accompanied by Latin translation (P.Amherst II 26, column ii)

Editions include:

- Boissonade (1844)
- Lachmann (1845)
- Schneider (1853)
- Johann Adam Hartung (1858, edition and German translation)
- Eberhard (1876)
- Gitlbauer (1882)
- Rutherford (1883)
- Knoll, Fabularum Babrianarum Paraphrasis Bodleiana (1877)
- Feuillet (1890)
- Desrousseaux (1890)
- Passerat (1892)
- Croiset (1892)
- Crusius (1897)
- Holzberg (2019)

See also:

- Mantels, Über die Fabeln des B. [On the fables of Babrius] (1840)
- Crusius, De Babrii Aetate (1879)
- Ficus, De Babrii Vita (1889)
- J Weiner, Quaestiones Babrianae (1891)
- Conington, Miscellaneous Writings, ii. 460-491
- Marchiano, Babrio (1899)
- Fusci, Babrio (1901)
- Christoffersson, Studia de Fabvlis Babrianis (1901).
- Spielhofer, Babrios. Ein Interpretationskommentar zu den Prologen und Fabeln 1 bis 17 [Babrius. An interpretative commentary on the prologues and the fables 1–17] (2023).

Early translations in English were made by Davies (1860) and in French by Levêque (1890), and in many other languages. More contemporary translations are by Denison B. Hull (University of Chicago Press) and Ben E. Perry (Harvard University Press).

In 1941, Heritage Press produced a "fine book" edition of Aesop, translated and adapted by Munro Leaf as juvenalia and illustrated by Robert Lawson.

In 1998, Penguin Classics released a new translation by Olivia and Robert Temple, entitled Aesop: The Complete Fables in reference to the fact that some previous translations were partial. Working from the Chambry text published in 1927, the Temple translation includes 358 fables; Robert Temple acknowledges on page xxiv that scholars will in all likelihood challenge the "Aesopian" origin of some of them.
