= James Colbrand =

16th-century English politician

James Colbrand (bef. 1544 – 1600), of Chichester, Sussex, was an English politician.

He was a member (MP) of the parliament of England for Ludgershall in 1571 and 1572 and for Appleby 1597.
