= Sir Robert Price, 2nd Baronet =

British baronet and Member of Parliament

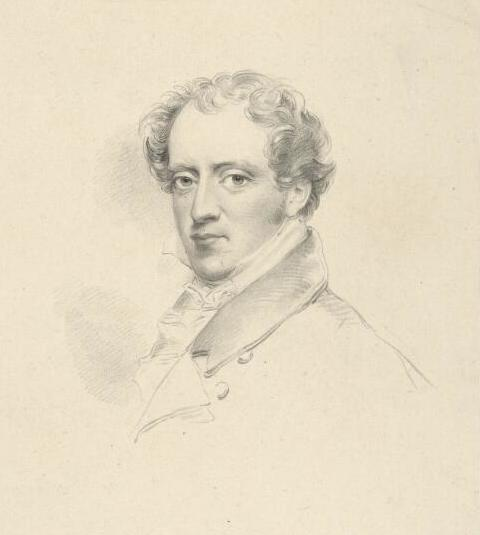
Portrait of Robert Price

Sir Robert Price, 2nd Baronet (3 August 1786 – 6 November 1857) was a British baronet and Member of Parliament.

Robert Price was the only son of Sir Uvedale Price, the writer on the Picturesque, by Lady Caroline Carpenter, fourth daughter of George Carpenter, 1st Earl of Tyrconnel.

He was MP for Herefordshire from 1818 until 1841. On 8 July 1823 he married his first cousin Mary Anne Elizabeth, daughter of Rev. Dr. Robert Price, Canon of Salisbury and Prebendary of Durham, by his second wife Mary Anne Sanderson. The marriage took place at the house of Barrington Price, then of Haslemere, the youngest of his six uncles on his father's side. Sir Uvedale Price died in 1829 and Robert succeeded as 2nd Baronet of Foxley.

Sir Robert stood for election to the constituency of Hereford City in 1845; he was unopposed, and remained the city's MP until January 1857. He was "of Whig principles; in favour of an extension of the franchise and short parliaments".

In 1820, he began buying up leases, leading to the founding of Tondu Ironworks. His Glamorgan Coal and Iron Company prospered during the 1830s and 1840s, but by 1850 it was struggling because of a fall in iron prices and Sir Robert was in danger of bankruptcy until the works were bought in 1854 by John Brogden and Sons.

He died on 5 or 6 November 1857 without issue, whereupon the baronetcy became extinct. His widow died in March 1878.

Parliament of the United Kingdom
Preceded by Thomas Foley; Sir John Cotterell	Member of Parliament for Herefordshire; 1818 – 1841; With: Sir John Cotterell until 1831; Kedgwin Hoskins 1831–1847; Edward Thomas Foley 1832–1841	Succeeded by Thomas Baskerville; Kedgwin Hoskins; Joseph Bailey
Preceded by Edward Bolton Clive; Robert Pulsford	Member of Parliament for Hereford; 1845 – 1857; With: Robert Pulsford until 1847; Henry Morgan-Clifford from 1847	Succeeded by George Clive; Henry Morgan-Clifford
Baronetage of the United Kingdom
Preceded by Uvedale Price	Baronet (of Foxley, Herefordshire); 1829–1857	Extinct
