= Ralph Cockerell =

English politician and clergyman

Ralph Cockerell (died 1576?) was an English politician and clergyman, who served as MP for Ludgershall and rector of Acton, Middlesex.

Cockerell's early life is unknown, though he had connections in Cheshunt, Hertfordshire. He was probably the Cockerell who graduated B.A. at Cambridge in 1523/4. In 1534, he co-signed a letter from the scholars of Trinity Hall, Cambridge to Thomas Cromwell, defending a member of the college against a charge of treason.

He was elected MP for Ludgershall in the parliament of 1547–1552. He then went to Ireland, where he was appointed a clerk of the pipe at the Irish Exchequer on 23 November 1553. By 1555 he was secretary to Sir Anthony St Leger, the Lord Deputy of Ireland. He was appointed a clerk of the Privy Council of Ireland in 1559.

He then entered the church, and was instituted rector of Acton, Middlesex on 26 February 1563. In this capacity he was a member of the Convocation of 1563 as a clerical proctor for Surrey, voting for the "six articles" compromise (which was defeated) and signing a petition of the Lower House for discipline. In 1573, Cockerell was party to a case in the Court of Requests: John Garaway of Buckhurst, Sussex complained that Cockerell had dishonestly procured from a third party an indenture made some four years previously by which Garaway was to pay Cockerell £50 a year for a lease of the rectory and advowson of Acton.

Cockerell probably died early in 1576: his successor as rector of Acton was instituted on 3 May 1576.
