= Francis Wegg-Prosser =

English convert to Roman Catholicism

Francis Richard Wegg-Prosser (19 June 1824 – 16 August 1911), born Francis Richard Haggitt, was a wealthy Englishman and Roman Catholic convert who established the Benedictine community which became Belmont Abbey and so played a significant role in the English Catholic Revival.

== Early life ==
Wegg-Prosser was born Francis Richard Haggitt, the only son of Prebendary Francis Haggitt, rector of Nuneham Courtenay Oxfordshire. He was educated at Eton and Balliol College, Oxford from where he graduated with a Mathematics degree in 1845.

== Public service ==
He served as Conservative Member of Parliament (MP) for Herefordshire from 1847 to 1852. In 1849, he inherited the very substantial estates (estimated at over £250,000 - equivalent to around £10 million in 2005) of his great-uncle, Richard Prosser, Archdeacon of Durham. At the time of this inheritance he changed his name by royal licence to Wegg-Prosser.

== Conversion ==
In 1852 he converted to Roman Catholicism and was received into the Catholic Church by Bishop Grant of Southwark.

== Catholic revival ==
After providing facilities for Catholic worship in his neighbourhood, he built a church on his estate, which, by agreement with the Bishop of Newport and the superiors of the English Benedictine Congregation, became the pro-cathedral of the diocese. On the adjoining land given by him, a monastery was built, to serve as the novitiate and house of studies of the congregation. This became Belmont Abbey which was officially dedicated and handed to Bishop Joseph Brown in 1859.

Wegg-Prosser was also identified with several Catholic interests. For many years he was a member of the Superior Council of the Society of St Vincent de Paul, a member of the Catholic Union, and a representative of the Diocese of Newport on the Catholic Education Council. In his secular life he was devoted to mathematical science, and particularly to astronomy. He wrote a book, Galileo and his Judges (London, 1889), on the question of Galileo. He also translated, under the title Rome and her captors (London, 1875), the letters collected by Count Henri d'Ideville upon the Roman question of 1867–70.

In 1850 he married Lady Harriet Catherine, daughter of the second Earl Somers. She died in 1893, leaving two sons and two daughters.

He died near Hereford, England, in 1911, aged 87.

Parliament of the United Kingdom
Preceded by Thomas Baskerville; Kedgwin Hoskins; Joseph Bailey	Member of Parliament for Herefordshire; 1847–1852; With: George Cornewall Lewis 1847–1852; Joseph Bailey until 1850; Thomas Booker from 1850	Succeeded by James King King; Charles Hanbury; Thomas Booker
