= Borlase Richmond Webb =

Borlase Richmond Webb (c. 1696–1738), of Biddesden House, Wiltshire, was a British landowner and Tory politician who sat in the House of Commons from 1722 to 1734.

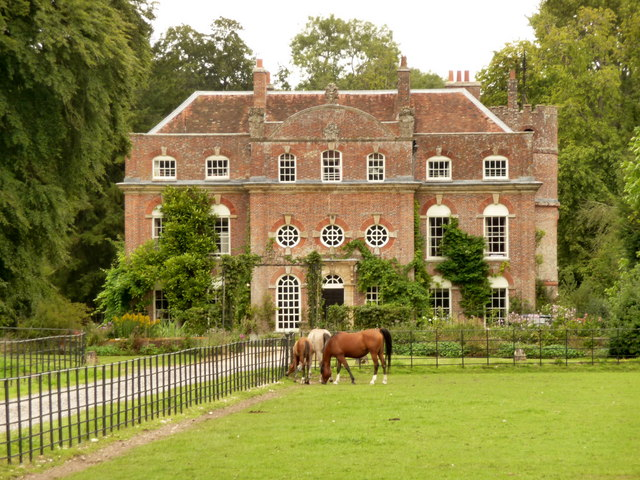
Biddesden House

Webb was the second son of John Richmond Webb of Biddesden and his first wife Henrietta Borlase, daughter of William Borlase and Joanna Bancks. As a young child, he received a commission in 1701 as Ensign in the 8th Foot, his father's regiment, and was captain from 1705 to 1715. He left the army at the same time as his father in 1715. In 1716 he went to Italy and spent some time at the Academy at Turin.

Webb was returned with his father as a Tory Member of Parliament for Ludgershall at the 1722 general election. His father died in 1724 and he succeeded to the family estates to the exclusion of his elder brother Edmund. He was returned again at the 1727 general election. In 1733, he voted against the Excise Bill. He was defeated at the 1734 general election.

Webb married Hester Newton on 6 July 1727. He died without issue on 3 March 1738; on his wife's death the estate reverted to his half-brother, also named John Richmond Webb.

Parliament of Great Britain
Preceded by John Richmond Webb; John Ivory Talbot	Member of Parliament for Ludgershall; 1722–1734; With: John Richmond Webb 1722-1724; Anthony Cornish 1724-1727; Charles Boone 1727-1734	Succeeded by Peter Delmé; Daniel Boone
