= Biddesden House =

Grade I listed house in the United Kingdom

Coordinates: 51.2575°N 1.5782°W

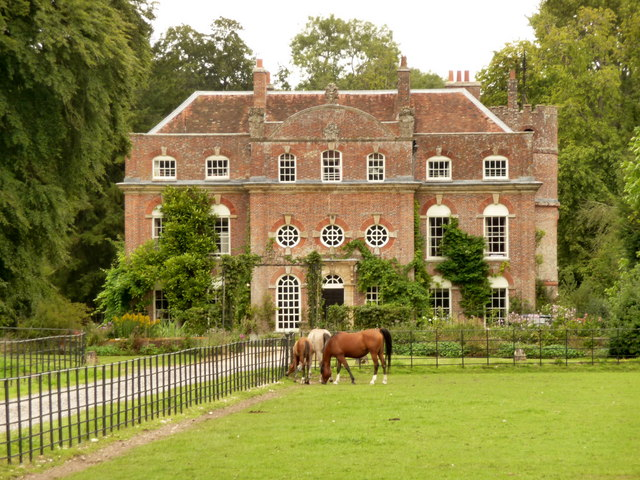
Biddesden House

Biddesden House (or Biddesden Park) is a Grade I listed English country house in east Wiltshire, about 5 miles (8 km) north-west of Andover, Hampshire. The house stands in parkland about 2 miles (3 km) east of Ludgershall village, and is home to an Arabian horse stud farm.

== History ==
Biddesden manor was bought in 1693 by John Richmond Webb (1667–1724), an army officer who would rise to the rank of General. His purchase may have been aided by wealth brought by his wife: in 1690 he had married Henrietta Borlase, daughter of William Borlase MP and the widow of Sir Richard Astley, 1st Baronet. After his retirement from the army, Webb replaced the manor house at Biddesden with the present house, built in stages around 1711–1712.

On the General's death the estate passed to his son Borlase Richmond Webb (c. 1696–1738) and then the latter's half-brother, also John Richmond Webb (1721–1766). The Victoria County History traces later owners.

About 1909 it was bought sight unseen by George Gribble, on the recommendation of his wife Norah Royd and their son Philip; the family moved there from Henlow Grange, Bedfordshire. In 1929 Biddesden House and about 200 acres were sold, probably by Olive Baring, to E. R. Fothergill, who in 1931 sold them to Bryan Guinness, later Lord Moyne. Guinness descendants still live there.

== Architecture and design ==
Biddesden house is built in Flemish bond brick with stone dressings. The architect is unknown, perhaps Webb himself. It has two stories plus attic, seven bays to its south front and both sides, and domestic quarters to the rear. At the north-east a round turret carries a bell brought by Webb from the 1708 siege of Lille. Inside is a double height entrance hall, lit by three round windows at first floor height, and there is mid-18th-century panelling in several rooms.

Pevsner describes Biddesden as "a very remarkable house" for its place in English architecture. It was designated as Grade I listed in 1952.

On the west front, Dora Carrington painted a blank window in 1931 with a trompe-l'œil cook, cat and canary behind glazing bars. Richard Pym painted two more on the east front in 1935, showing Regency people.

== Park and gardens ==
Formal terraced gardens west of the house were probably created by General Webb, together with the walled kitchen garden. By 1841, during the ownership of the Everett family, there was an orchard, flower garden and shrubbery. Bryan Guinness made improvements to the gardens in the early 1930s. The gardens and surrounding park, which extend south of Biddesden Lane into Hampshire, in all some 12 acres (4.9 ha), were recorded on the national Register of Historic Parks and Gardens in 1987.

Listed features in the grounds include 18th-century stables and a dairy, an octagonal dovecote from the same period, and a copper-domed pavilion of c.1933 overlooking the swimming pool. Inside the latter are brightly-coloured mosaics by Boris Anrep.

== Biddesden Stud ==
The stud bred the eventing champion Tamarillo.
