= Sir Joseph Barrington, 1st Baronet =

Anglo-Irish merchant and benefactor (1764–1846)

Sir Joseph Barrington, 1st Baronet (21 February 1764 – 10 January 1846) was an Anglo-Irish merchant and benefactor.

Barrington was the son of Matthew Barrington and Jane Canter. He established a business on Charlotte Quay in Limerick, exporting the produce of the Golden Vale. Barrington was a leading figure in initiating land reclamation and the construction of embankments to allow the city to expand along the River Shannon. In 1830 he built Barrington's Quay on the north bank of the Shannon. He established a charitable foundation in Limerick, and in 1831 he funded and opened Barrington's Hospital on George's Quay, which remains a medical facility. On 30 September 1831 he was created a baronet, of Limerick in the Baronetage of the United Kingdom.

In 1787 Barrington married Mary Baggott; they had five sons and two daughters. He was the owner of Glenstal Abbey. Barrington was succeeded in his title by his son, Matthew.

Baronetage of the United Kingdom
New title	Baronet (of Limerick); 1831–1846	Succeeded by Matthew Barrington
