= John Kingsmill (MP for Ludgershall) =

English politician

John Kingsmill (ca. 1536 – will proved 1590), of King's Enham, Hampshire, was an English politician.

He was a member (MP) of the parliament of England for Ludgershall in 1584 and 1586.
