= George Agar-Ellis, 1st Baron Dover =

British politician and writer (1797-1833)

The Right Honourable The Lord Dover PC FRS FSA
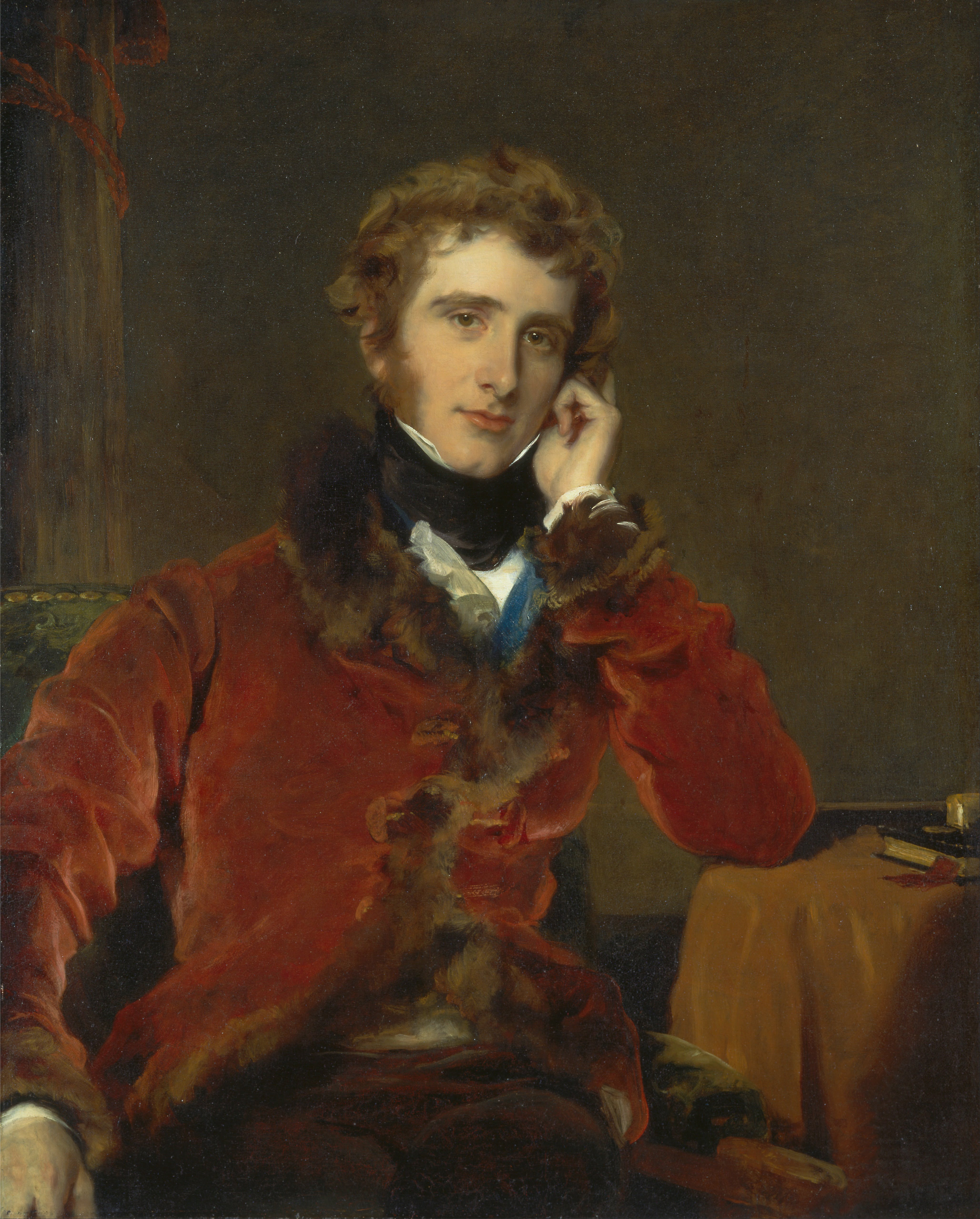

First Commissioner of Woods and Forests
- In office 2 December 1830 – 7 February 1831
- Monarch: William IV
- Prime Minister: The Earl Grey
- Preceded by: Viscount Lowther
- Succeeded by: Viscount Duncannon

Personal details
- Born: George James Welbore Agar-Ellis; 14 January 1797
- Died: 10 July 1833 (aged 36)
- Party: Whig
- Spouse: Lady Georgiana Howard (d. 1860)
- Education: Christ Church, Oxford

George James Welbore Agar-Ellis, 1st Baron Dover (14 January 1797 – 10 July 1833) was a British politician and man of letters. He was briefly First Commissioner of Woods and Forests under Lord Grey between 1830 and 1831.

== Background and education ==
Agar-Ellis was the only son of Henry Agar-Ellis, 2nd Viscount Clifden, and Lady Caroline, daughter of George Spencer, 4th Duke of Marlborough. He was educated at Westminster School and Christ Church, Oxford. He was elected a Fellow of both the Society of Antiquaries and Royal Society in 1816.

== Political career ==
Agar-Ellis was returned to Parliament for Heytesbury in 1818, a seat he held until 1820. He afterwards represented Seaford between 1820 and 1826, Ludgershall between 1826 and 1830 and Okehampton between 1830 and 1831. He supported George Canning's motion in 1822 for a bill to relieve the disabilities of Roman Catholic peers, and consistently supported liberal principles. He took little interest in party politics but was a strong advocate of state support for the causes of literature and the fine arts.

He commissioned the painting The Trial of Queen Caroline by George Hayter, which was exhibited in 1823. In 1824 Agar-Ellis was the leading promoter of the grant of £57,000 for the purchase of John Julius Angerstein's collection of pictures, which formed the foundation of the National Gallery. On the formation of Lord Grey's Whig administration in November 1830, he was sworn of the Privy Council and appointed First Commissioner of Woods and Forests. However, he was forced to resign after two months due to bad health.

In June 1831, during his father's lifetime, Agar-Ellis was raised to the peerage as Baron Dover, of Dover in the County of Kent. He was president of the Royal Society of Literature in 1832, a trustee of the British Museum and of the National Gallery, and a commissioner of public records.

== Family ==
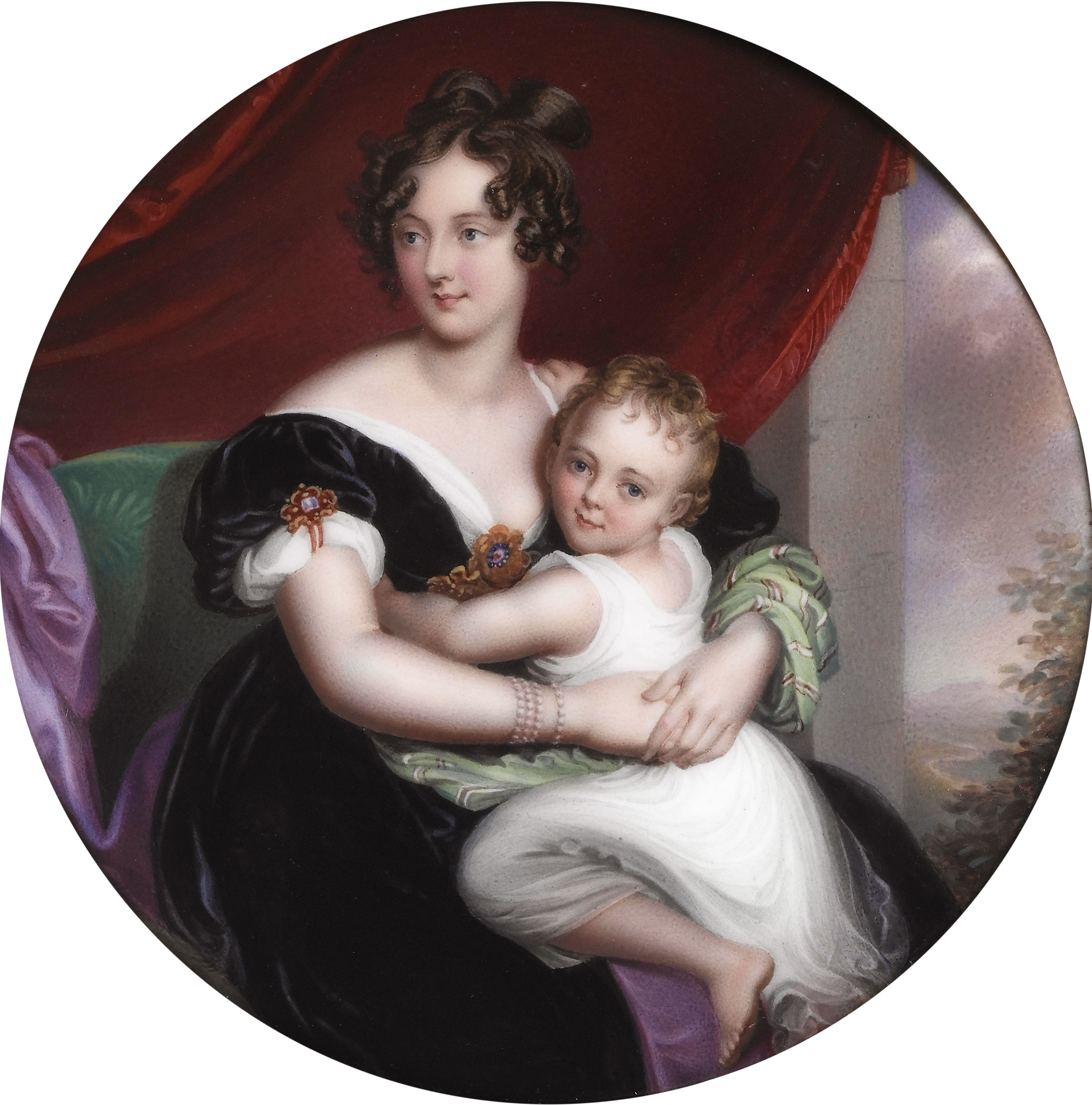
Georgiana Agar Ellis (after a painting by Thomas Lawrence)

Lord Dover married his third cousin once removed Lady Georgiana Howard, daughter of George Howard, 6th Earl of Carlisle, in 1822. They had two sons, who became respectively the 3rd Viscount and 5th Viscount, and two daughters. He died on 10 July 1833, aged 36, predeceasing his father by three years. Lady Dover died in March 1860.

== Works ==
Lord Dover's works were chiefly historical, and include:

- The True History of the State Prisoner, Commonly Called the Iron Mask (1826)
- Inquiries respecting the Character of Clarendon (1827)
- a Life of Frederick II. (1831)

He also edited the Ellis Correspondence (1829) and Walpole's Letters to Sir Horace Mann (1833).

Parliament of the United Kingdom
Preceded by Samuel Hood; Charles Duncombe	Member of Parliament for Heytesbury; 1818–1820; With: William Henry John Scott	Succeeded by Edward Henry A'Court; Charles Ashe A'Court
Preceded by Charles Ellis; George Watson-Taylor	Member of Parliament for Seaford; 1820–1826; With: Charles Ellis	Succeeded by John Fitzgerald; Augustus Frederick Ellis
Preceded by Sandford Graham; The Earl of Brecknock	Member of Parliament for Ludgershall; 1826–1830; With: Edward Thomas Foley	Succeeded by Edward Thomas Foley; Sir Sandford Graham, Bt
Preceded by Sir Compton Domvile, Bt; Joseph Strutt	Member of Parliament for Okehampton; 1830–1831; With: Lord Seymour	Succeeded by William Henry Trant; John Thomas Hope
Political offices
Preceded by Viscount Lowther	First Commissioner of Woods and Forests; 1830–1831	Succeeded by Viscount Duncannon
Peerage of the United Kingdom
New creation	Baron Dover; 1831–1833	Succeeded by Henry Agar-Ellis
