= Sir Joseph Birch, 1st Baronet =

Sir Joseph Birch, 1st Baronet (1755–1833), of The Hazles, Prescot, near Liverpool, England, was the Member of Parliament for Nottingham from 1802 to 16 March 1803 and in 1818–1830, and for Ludgershall on 22 December 1812 – 1818. He was created baronet in 1831.

Baronetage of the United Kingdom
New creation	Baronet (of Hasles); 1831–1833	Succeeded by Thomas Birch
