= Charles Danvers (MP for Ludgershall) =

English politician

Charles Danvers (by 1580 – 21 October 1626), of Baynton, Edington, Wiltshire and the Middle Temple, London, was an English politician.

He was a Member (MP) of the Parliament of England for Ludgershall in 1614.

Danvers married one Mary, of Steeple Ashton, Wiltshire, in 1605 and they had five sons and nine daughters. He died at his house at Baynton on 21 October 1626 and was buried in Edington church.

Danvers had a fondness for the poet and priest George Herbert, a distant relative, and had expressed a desire for him to marry one of his daughters. Herbert duly married Jane (d. 1661) at Edington church in 1629.
