= George Cope (MP) =

16th-century English politician

George Cope (c. 1534 – 23 June 1572), of Canons Ashby and Eydon, Northamptonshire, was an English politician.

He was a member (MP) of the parliament of England for Ludgershall in 1563.
