= Bengt Richter =

Swedish medallist (1670–1735)

Bengt Richter (also Benedikt) (born 1670; died 1735–1737) was a Swedish medallist.

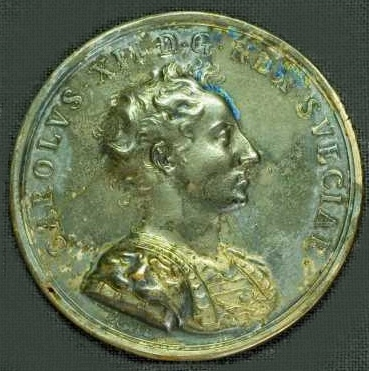
Medallion of Charles XII of Sweden.

== Life ==
Born at Stockholm, he was a pupil and son-in-law of the medal engraver Arvid Karlsteen.

After leaving Sweden Richter worked for some time in Paris, where he was employed at the Medal Mint to engrave medals for Louis XIV. In 1703 he spent time in England, but quite soon returned to Stockholm, having a post as engraver at the Royal Mint there.

In 1712 Richter was called to Vienna to fill the post of Chief Medallist (Obermedailleur) to the Imperial Mint, and on 15 of January 1715 he was named Inspector of the Coinage (K. Münipräginspector). There is documentary evidence that he also spent a period at Berlin, about 1710 to 1712. He died at Vienna sometime between 1735 and 1737.
