= Robert Lytton =

English Member of Parliament

Robert Lytton (fl. 1491-1504), was an English Member of Parliament (MP).

He was a Member of the Parliament of England for Ludgershall in 1491-2 and for Hertfordshire in 1495, and possibly 1497 and 1504.
