= Arvid Karlsteen =

Swedish medal engraver (1647–1718)

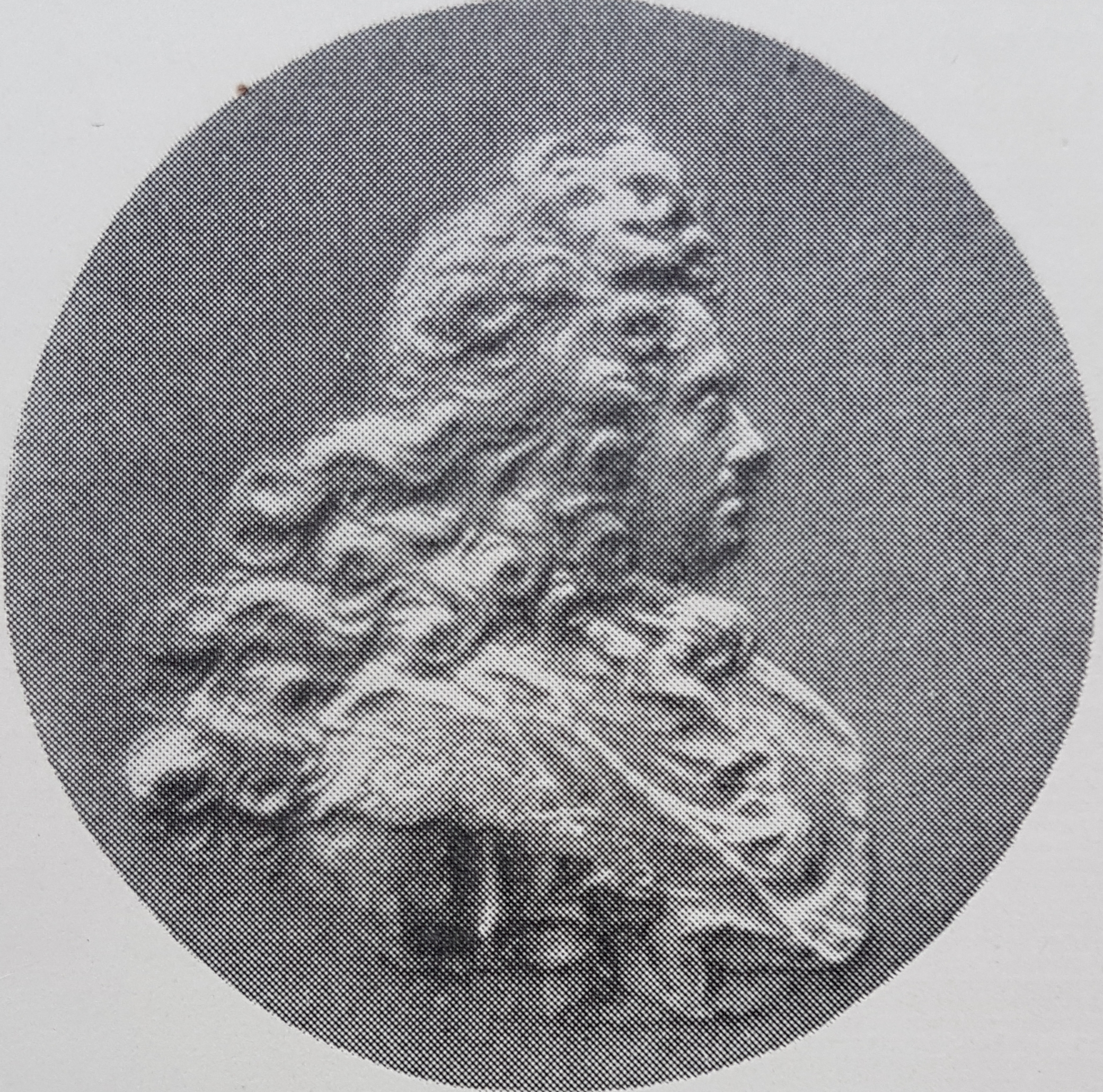
- Born: 16 March 1647; Gelleråsen (present-day Karlskoga Municipality), Sweden
- Died: 3 May 1718 (aged 71); Stockholm, Sweden
- Spouse: Magdalena Elisabet Schenkowitz
- Children: 10

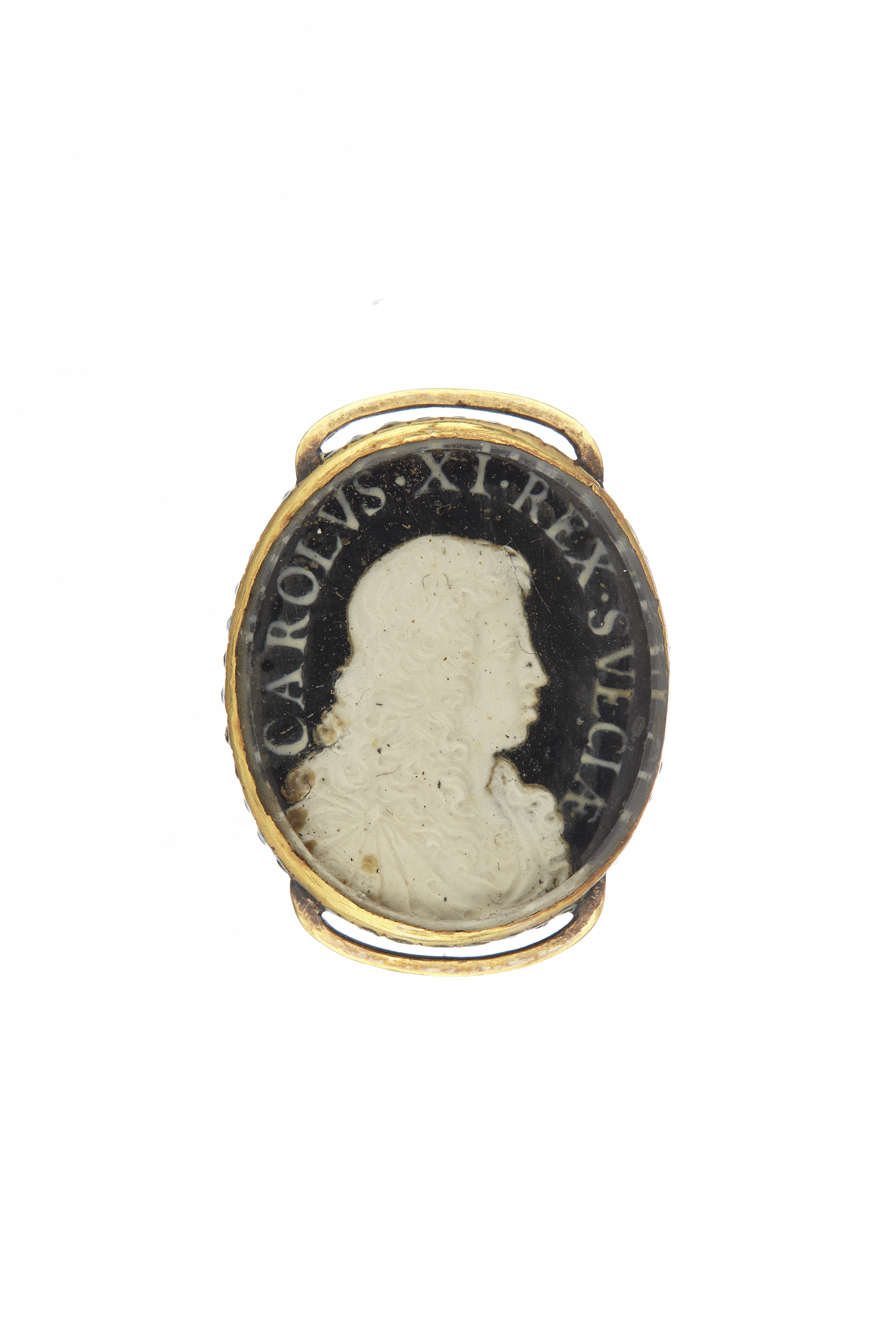
Miniature portrait of Charles XI of Sweden made by Karlsteen

Arvid Karlsteen (16 March 1647 – 3 May 1718) was a Swedish medal engraver and portrait miniaturist.

Born on March 16, 1647, on a farm near Karlskoga. Karlsteen was the son of Jonas Kjellander, a cartographer, and his wife Brita Larsdotter von Sacken. He was ennobled in 1692.

Married Magdalena Elisabet Schenkowitz in 1674 and had issue.
