= 1657 in literature =

This article contains information about the literary events and publications of 1657.

== Events ==
- January – Madame de la Fayette returns to Paris, where she is introduced to, and becomes friends with, Madame de Sévigné.
- March 2 – The Great Fire of Meireki in Edo, Japan, burns down the city's theatres, forcing actors to move to Osaka.

== New books ==
=== Prose ===
- "William Allen" – Killing No Murder (variously attributed to Colonel Silius Titus, Edward Sexby or William Allen, an English Republican; Sexby admits authorship under duress)
- Cave Beck – The Universal Character
- Cyrano de Bergerac (posthumous) – L'Autre Monde: ou les États et Empires de la Lune (Comical History of the States and Empires of the Moon)
- John Bramhall - Castigations of Mr. Hobbes his last animadversions in the case concerning liberty and universal necessity wherein all his exceptions about that controversie are fully satisfied.
- Baltasar Gracián – El criticón (third part)
- Theodore Haak (translator) – The Dutch Annotations Upon the Whole Bible (original 1637)
- Peter Heylyn - Cosmographie
- Christiaan Huygens – De ratiociniis in ludo aleae
- Nihon Ōdai Ichiran (日本王代一覧, Table of the Rulers of Japan)
- Richard Ligon – A True and Exact History of the Island of Barbadoes
- François Hédelin, abbé d'Aubignac – Pratique du théâtre
- Jeremy Taylor – Discourse of the Nature, Offices and Measures of Friendship
- Paul Scarron – Roman comique (Comic romance, publication concluded)
- Brian Walton, Bishop of Chester – Polyglot Bible
- Li Yu (probable author) – The Carnal Prayer Mat (published 1693)

=== Children ===
Les Jeux et plaisirs de l'enfance

=== Drama ===
- Anonymous – Lust's Dominion (published, falsely attributed in some impressions to Marlowe; probably by Dekker and others, written c.1600)
- Richard Brome – The Queen's Exchange (published)
- Sir Aston Cockayne – The Obstinate Lady (published)
- Lodowick Carlell
  - The Fool Would be a Favorite, or The Discreet Lover (published)
  - The Tragedy of Osmond the Great Turk, or the Noble Servant (published)
- George Gerbier d'Ouvilly – The False Favourite Disgraced, and the Reward of Loyalty (published)
- Franciscus van den Enden – Philedonius
- Andreas Gryphius – Katharina von Georgien
- Thomas Jordan – Fancy's Festivals (masque) (published)
- Thomas Middleton (died 1627)
  - No Wit, No Help Like a Woman's (published)
  - Two New Plays; first publication of Women Beware Women and More Dissemblers Besides Women

=== Poetry ===
- William Davenant – Poems on Several Occasions
- Angelus Silesius – Heilige Seelenlust (collection of hymns)

== Births ==
- February 11 – Bernard le Bovier de Fontenelle French author (died 1757)
- March 24 – Arai Hakuseki, Japanese scholar-bureaucrat and writer (died 1725)
- November 26 – William Derham, English natural philosopher and cleric (died 1735)
- unknown date – Matthew Tindal, English deist writer (died 1733)

== Deaths ==
- March 7 – Hayashi Razan (林羅山), Japanese philosopher (born 1583)
- April ? – Richard Lovelace, English Cavalier poet (born 1617)
- August 29 – John Lilburne, English writer and agitator (born c. 1614)
- November 18 – Luke Wadding, Irish historian (born 1588)
- November 19 – Théodore Tronchin, Swiss theologian (born 1582)
- unknown dates
  - Junije Palmotić, Ragusan (Dubrovnik) dramatist and poet (born c. 1606)
  - Thomas Tuke, English controversialist and cleric (born c. 1580)
- probable – Thomas Bayly, English religious controversialist (born early 17th century)
