= Ordinance of no quarter to the Irish =

The ordinance of no quarter to the Irish was a decree of the English Long Parliament passed on 24 October 1644 in response to the Irish Catholic Confederation threat to send troops from Ireland to support King Charles I during the English Civil War. The decree ordered Parliamentary officers to give no quarter to Irish soldiers fighting in England and Wales, and Irish Confederate sailors at sea who surrendered.

The Kilkenny Confederacy had already sent 2,000 troops to support Montrose's Royalist army in Scotland in its struggle against the Covenanters. The Irish Confederates had negotiated with Charles I concerning the use of Irish forces in campaigns for England and Wales, but the negotiations had broken down over the public practice of Catholicism and the independence of the Irish Parliament. The return of 5,000 English Royalist soldiers from Ireland due to a then-recent ceasefire was mistaken by the Parliamentarians as the arrival of Irish forces in England. The English Protestants were scared that the Irish Catholics were going to perform massacres in the style of the ones they had performed during the Irish Rebellion of 1641.

Due to the anti-Irish sentiment of the conflict, Irish prisoners of war were already at risk of summary execution before the ordinance. In July 1644, William Sydenham had summarily executed a number of captured Royalists under the excuse that they were "mere Irish rebels".

== Context ==
The Kilkenny Confederacy sent 2,000 troops in three regiments under the command of Alasdair MacColla to support Montrose's Royalist army in Scotland who were fighting against the Covenanters in 1644. During the years 1643 and 1644 they also promised to send 10,000 troops to England and Wales. The troops were never sent, because the negotiations with Charles I broke down over the public practice of Catholicism and the independence of the Irish Parliament. A ceasefire deal between the Irish Confederates and English Royalists did result in the return of some 5,000 Royalist troops from Ireland in 1643–44. The confusion of these regiments with the Irish Catholics, associated in Parliamentarian minds with the massacres of the Irish Rebellion of 1641, did much to frighten English Protestant opinion. English Parliamentarians had often taunted Prince Rupert that he was a German mercenary, and while they could just about tolerate foreign Protestants and English Roman Catholics fighting as Royalists, they considered support by foreign Roman Catholics a much greater threat.

Even before the Ordinance was passed Irish prisoners were in danger of being summarily executed. For example, in July 1644 Colonel William Sydenham defeated a Royalist plundering party from the garrison of Wareham at Dorchester, and hanged six or eight of his prisoners as being "mere Irish rebels". This gave rise to reprisals on the part of the Royalists.

== Ordinance ==
The English Parliament's response to the Kilkenny Confederacy's proposed expeditionary force to England was to pass the Ordinance of no quarter to the Irish:

... no quarter shall be given hereafter to any Irishman, nor any Papist whatsoever born in Ireland, who shall be taken in hostility against the Parliament ... every officer that shall be remiss or negligent in observing the tenor of this ordinance shall be reputed a favourer of that bloody rebellion in Ireland (Lenihan 2001, p. 211).

This Ordinance was effective only in England and Wales and did not apply to Scotland or Ireland (as they were not part of the same realm, they were countries beyond English parliamentary jurisdiction).

== Application ==
The relative absence of Irish Catholic soldiers in England meant that the Ordinance was rarely acted upon. However, after the cessation of arms between the Confederates and the Royalists in 1643, this allowed Ormonde to send 8,000 troops from Dublin and Munster and aid the King. Although most were in fact Englishmen, a small contingent consisted of Irish Royalists. In the instances where these Irish were captured, execution swiftly followed. After the Parliamentarians' capture of Shrewsbury, a number of Irish soldiers were hanged in accordance with the law. In response, Prince Rupert executed an equal number of Parliamentarian troops, much to the English Parliament's disgust. Similarly, after the fall of Conwy Castle, seventy-five Irish prisoners were executed. One example of the severity of this law was the massacre of some Welsh civilian camp followers (who were mistaken for Irish) by Parliamentarian soldiers after the Battle of Naseby in 1645. The Welsh, mostly women, were speaking the Welsh language, which the Roundhead troops mistook for Irish. Historian Charles Carlton has commented that the incident "was so unusual that it caused considerable comment".

Irish military historian Pádraig Lenihan explains that, in practice, although the war at sea was covered by the Ordinance, as the Irish privateers captured more English sailors than the English did Irish and held English prisoners to exchange them for Irish prisoners, the ordinance for naval warfare lapsed. As he explains, "The 'laws' of war evolved like any primitive legal code, from the principle of reciprocity; self-interest counselled against brutality if there was the chance of being paid back in the same coin".

== Reciprocity in the Wars of the Three Kingdoms ==
In Ireland, the Irish Confederate Wars were waged with considerable brutality. Irish military historian Pádraig Lenihan makes the point that the Ordinance "illustrates the depth of the conviction that the Irish shared a common and irredeemable blood guilt. The pitiless execution of Covenanters by Mac Colla's followers would seem to show that for the Irish, too, battle against British forces was waged without moral restraint. In practice, however, restraints in Ireland. For example, O'Neill, immediately after Benburb, sent 150 prisoners (excluding officers, whom he kept for ransom) under escort back to Scottish quarters (Hogan, war in Ireland)".

In England as in Ireland and on the high seas, expedient reciprocity often won over other principles. For example, at the start of the First English Civil War Major John Lilburne was captured at the Battle of Brentford. Not only was he the most senior Parliamentary officer captured during the first campaigning season but also he was well known for his radical views. Plans to try him for treason, for bearing arms against the king, were dropped when the Parliamentary side threatened to retaliate in kind, and he was exchanged for a Royalist officer. At the end of the Second English Civil War and the apparent utter defeat of the Royalist cause, the Parliamentary side was far less lenient than at the end of the first war.

In the view of the Parliamentarians, Royalist leaders who had participated in the second war (and who in some cases had broken their parole given at the end of the first war not to take up arms against Parliament) had caused pointless bloodshed for a lost cause, and so, for example, three of the five prominent Royalist peers who fought in the second war and were captured by the Parliamentarians were beheaded at Westminster on 9 March 1648. This opinion reached all the way to the top of the Royalist cause, with the Grandees of the New Model Army, who before the second war had wanted a negotiated settlement with Charles I, reluctantly coming round to the radicals' point of view that "Charles Stuart, that man of blood" should be tried – and possibly executed, as he was in January 1649.
