= Interregnum (England) =

Period in English history

The Interregnum (Note: (literally meaning "between reign" in Latin)) was the period between the execution of Charles I on 30 January 1649 and the arrival of his son Charles II in London on 29 May 1660, which marked the start of the Restoration. During the Interregnum, England was under various forms of republican government.

== Politics ==
The politics of the period were dominated by the wishes of the Grandees (senior officers) of the New Model Army and their civilian supporters. They encouraged (or at least tolerated) several republican regimes. From 1649 until 1653 executive powers lay with the Council of State, while legislative functions were carried out by the Rump Parliament.

In 1653, the Grandees, with Oliver Cromwell leading these reformists, dismissed the Rump Parliament, replacing it with a Nominated Assembly (nicknamed the Parliament of Saints or Barebone's Parliament). This Barebone's Parliament was composed of 140 nominees, 129 from England and Wales, five from Scotland and six from Ireland. It proved to be as difficult for the executive to work with this Parliament as it had with the Rump Parliament, so after sitting for five months, members friendly to the Grandees engendered its dissolution on 12 December 1653.

After Instrument of Government, the first written constitution, was adopted on 15 December 1653, Cromwell was installed as Lord Protector on the following day. The Instrument of Government granted executive power to the Lord Protector. Although this post was elective, not hereditary, it was to be held for life. It also created a one chamber Parliament with its members chosen from redrawn districts that ultimately favored the gentry and required the calling of triennial Parliaments, with each sitting for at least five months. This would also mark the permanent disenfranchisement of Roman Catholics and all the participants of the Irish Rebellion. In January 1655, Cromwell dissolved the first Protectorate Parliament, ushering in a period of military Rule of the Major-Generals.

The Instruments of Government was replaced in May 1657 by England's second, and last, codified constitution, the Humble Petition and Advice. However Cromwell died the next year, and his nominated successor as Lord Protector, his son Richard, proved unable to govern effectively as various political parties strove to gain power.

The Protectorate came to an end in May 1659 when the Grandees recalled the Rump Parliament, which authorised a Committee of Safety to replace Richard's Council of State. This ushered in a period of unstable government, which did not come to an end until February 1660 when General George Monck, the English military governor of Scotland, marched to London at the head of his troops, and oversaw the restoration of the monarchy under Charles II.

== Life during the Interregnum ==
After the Parliamentarian victory in the English Civil War, the Puritan views of the majority of Parliament and its supporters began to be imposed on the rest of the country. The Puritans advocated an austere lifestyle and restricted what they saw as the excesses of the previous regime. Most prominently, holidays such as Christmas and Easter were suppressed. Pastimes such as the theatre and gambling were also banned. However, some forms of art that were thought to be "virtuous", such as opera, were encouraged. These changes are often credited to Cromwell, though they were introduced by the Commonwealth Parliament.

=== Jews in England ===
Rabbi Menasseh Ben Israel met Cromwell in 1655 to discuss the admission of Jews into England. Cromwell did not agree to all the rights that Ben Israel requested, but the opening of Jewish synagogues and burial grounds was tolerated under Cromwell's Protectorate. Judaism was still not practised openly in England, since Cromwell's move had been controversial and many in England were still hostile toward Jews. Life for Jews in England improved in that they could no longer be prosecuted if caught worshipping, yet discrimination continued.

== Radicals vs conservatives ==
Parliament had, to a large degree, encouraged the radical political groups which emerged when the usual social controls broke down during the civil war. It had also unwittingly established a new political force when it set up the New Model Army. Not surprisingly, all these groups had their own hopes for the new Commonwealth.

=== Levellers ===
Led by John Lilburne, Levellers drew their main support from London and the New Model Army. In the 1649 An Agreement of the People, they asked for a more representative and accountable Parliament, to meet every two years; a reform of law so it would be available to and fair to all; and religious toleration. They wanted a more democratic society, although their proposed franchise did not extend to women or to the lowest orders of society.

Levellers saw the Rump Parliament as little better than the monarchy it had replaced, and they showed their displeasure in demonstrations, pamphlets and mutinies. While their numbers did not pose a serious threat to the government, they scared the Rump Parliament into action, and a Treasons Act was passed against them in 1649.

=== Diggers ===
Led by Gerrard Winstanley, Diggers wanted an even more coercively equal society than the Levellers (in the sense of "equality of outcome", not "equality of opportunity" which the Levellers were closer to espousing). They advocated a lifestyle that bore many similarities to later understandings of communism and anarchism, with communal ownership of land, and equality for males and females in law and education. They existed in only very small numbers and faced a very strong opposition, even from the Levellers.

=== Religious sects ===
The breakdown of religious uniformity and incomplete Presbyterian Settlement of 1646 enabled independent churches to flourish. The main sects of English Dissenters were Baptists, who advocated adult rebaptism; Ranters, who claimed that sin did not exist for the "chosen ones"; and Fifth Monarchy Men, who opposed all "earthly" governments, believing they must prepare for God's kingdom on earth by establishing a "government of saints".

Despite greater toleration, extreme sects were opposed by the upper classes as they were seen as a threat to social order and property rights. Catholics were also excluded from the toleration applied to the other groups.

=== Conservatives ===
Conservatives were still dominant in both central government and local government. In the former, the Rump Parliament was anxious not to offend the traditional ruling class whose support it needed for survival, so it opposed radical ideas. In the latter, that ruling class dominated through the influence of traditional regional gentry.

== Historical analysis ==
The Interregnum was a relatively short but important period in the history of the British Isles. There were several political experiments without any stable form of government emerging, largely because of the wide diversity in religious and political groups that had been allowed to flourish after the regicide of Charles I.

The Puritan movement had evolved as a rejection of both real and perceived "Catholicisation" of the Church of England. When the Church of England was quickly disestablished by the Commonwealth government, the question of what church to establish became a hotly debated subject. In the end, it was impossible to make all the political factions happy. During the Interregnum, Cromwell lost much of the support he had gained during the civil war. Edward Sexby, previously a supporter of Cromwell's, felt disenfranchised by Cromwell's failure to abolish the aristocracy.

In 1657, Silius Titus called for Cromwell's assassination in a co-authored pamphlet Killing No Murder under the pseudonym of William Allen. Sexby was captured when he returned to England and attempted to carry out the assassination described in Titus' book. Cromwell coerced Sexby into confessing authorship of the pamphlet and then imprisoned him in the Tower of London, where Sexby was driven to insanity, dying there less than a year later. High taxes required by the large standing army, kept due to the constant threats of Scottish and Irish rebellion, added to public resentment of Cromwell.

== Second interregnum ==
After the fall of James II during the Glorious Revolution in 1688, an interregnum was declared and a Convention Parliament called to elect William III and Mary II joint monarchs.
