= Gerbier =

Gerbier is a surname. Notable people with the name include:

- Balthazar Gerbier (1592–1663), Anglo-Dutch courtier, diplomat, art advisor, miniaturist and architectural designer
- George Gerbier d'Ouvilly (fl. 1661), Dutch soldier, dramatist and translator
- Max Gerbier (born 1951), Haitian painter
- Thierry Gerbier (1965–2013), French biathlete

== See also ==
- Mont Gerbier de Jonc, a mountain of volcanic origin in the Massif Central in France
