= Elizabeth Lilburne =

Elizabeth Lilburne (fl. 1620–1660), born Elizabeth Dewell, was a Leveller and the wife of John Lilburne.

== Early life ==
Lilburne was born to London merchant Henry Dewell (d. in or after 1655). She married John Lilburne in or before September 1641 (shortly after his release from prison).No details of Lilburne's life survive prior to her marriage. She was involved in London separatist circles at the time of her marriage, one of thirteen women and sixteen men arrested in September 1641 for their attendance at John Spilsbury's Baptist congregation in Stepney. Her husband was politically active, which led to frequent spells in prison (often with Elizabeth alongside him) and time in exile.

John served as a captain in Baron Brooke's regiment where he was captured at the Battle of Brentford (1642) by royalists and threatened with execution. Elizabeth petitioned Parliament to threaten tit-for-tat executions of royalist prisoners if her husband was executed. She carried a letter of this news from the Speaker of the House of Commons to the Royalist court in exile in Oxford while pregnant. After John's release she spent a few months in Boston, Lincolnshire while he was serving with the army of the Eastern Association, though he became more and more disaffected with the dominant parliamentary factions. Heavily pregnant, she joined him in Newgate Prison in August 1645 when he was sent there for attacking William Lenthall. While there her daughter Elizabeth was born and baptised. Elizabeth's childbed linen was in the meantime stolen from the couple's London home by parliamentary officers hunting for "dangerous Bookes". Between then and 1649 they also had two sons.

John was imprisoned again in 1646-48 for attacking Presbyterian and parliamentarian authorities and in March to July 1649 - during the former period Elizabeth was arrested for circulating John's books. She caught smallpox (as did their 3 children - the sons died while the daughter survived) that led to his bail at the end of the latter. Elizabeth recovered and had seven more children, though only two (plus their first daughter) reached adulthood.

She became ill again in October 1649 and was unable to attend John's acquittal of treason by a London jury. The following 18 months were peaceful for the couple, living partly off the proceeds of confiscated Durham church lands that John had been granted in compensation for his 1630s punishments. In January 1652, a £7000 fine and exile was imposed on John Lilburne after his conviction for libel against Arthur Haselrig's administration of sequestered north-eastern estates. Prominent Baptist William Kiffin was an old friend of John and a former political ally, and sheltered Elizabeth during John's exile. She tried to convince him to reconcile himself to Oliver Cromwell for their family's sake, visiting him in Bruges and convincing him to return to England in June 1653. He was imprisoned on arrival and remained there until his death, apart from brief paroles, fathering two more children from 1652-53 (he criticised her for being "perfectly distracted" by the death of one of their children in this period). John's father and Elizabeth tried and failed in July 1655 to have him released, with themselves as guarantors of his good behaviour, and he was moved from Jersey to Dover. He died on bail, after his wife's last confinement, in Eltham on 29 August 1657.

== Later years ==
In his last years John became a Quaker, but it seems from his writings that Elizabeth did not join him. In his exile writings he called her arguments to him to return to be "mournful", the terms on which she recommended compromise as "sneaking terms [that] my soul abhorres [sic]" and Elizabeth herself "my poor credulous wife". However, her arguments were vindicated after his death when she eventually managed to gain from Cromwell the lifting of the 1652 fine, the renewal of a weekly pension of 40s. for herself and her children and help in settling disputes over the Durham property. Her pension was still paid in March 1660, though the improvement in her fortunes probably ended with the English Restoration. With John's obstinacy now removed, she managed to resolve the complex property disputes in Durham, so much so that Arthur Haselrig became an ally in Parliament (in return for her giving him all the papers relating to his original dispute with John).

== In popular culture ==
- In The Devil's Whore (2008) she is played by Maxine Peake.
