= Rowland Lytton =

English politician

Sir Rowland Lytton (c. 1615 – 1 November 1674) was an English politician who sat in the House of Commons between 1656 and 1660.

== Career ==
Lytton was the son of Sir William Lytton of Knebworth, and his wife Anne Slaney, daughter of Stephen Slaney of Norton Shropshire. He was schooled at Hertford and was admitted to Sidney Sussex College, Cambridge in 1632. In 1633 he was admitted at the Inner Temple.

In 1656, Lytton was elected Member of Parliament for Hertfordshire in the Second Protectorate Parliament. He was re-elected for Hertfordshire in 1659 for the Third Protectorate Parliament and in April 1660 for the Convention Parliament. He was knighted on 27 June 1660. He was appointed High Sheriff of Hertfordshire for 1662–63.

== Marriage and issue ==
Lytton married firstly Judith Edwards, daughter of Humphrey Edwards. He married secondly Rebecca Chapman, daughter of Thomas Chapman, and widow of Sir Richard Lucy.

Parliament of England
Preceded by Henry Lawrence; Sir Richard Lucy, Bt; John Wittewrong; The Earl of Salisbury; Thomas Nicholl	Member of Parliament for Hertfordshire; 1656–1660; With: Sir Richard Lucy, Bt 1656–1658; John Wittewrong 1656–1658; The Earl of Salisbury 1656–1658; Richard Galston 1659; Henry Caesar 1660	Succeeded by Sir Richard Franklin, 1st Baronet; Sir Thomas Fanshawe
