= Confidant =

Character in a story that a protagonist confides in and trusts

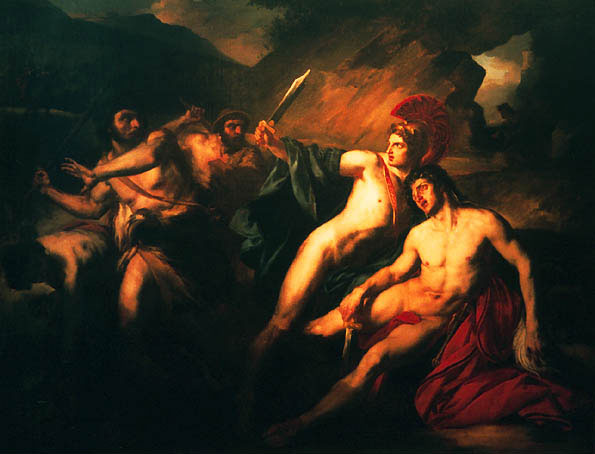
Orestes and Pylades, François Bouchot, 1822

The confidant (/ˈkɒnfɪdænt/ or /ˌkɒnfɪˈdɑːnt/; feminine: confidante, same pronunciation) is a character in a story whom a protagonist confides in and trusts. Confidants may be other principal characters, characters who command trust by virtue of their position such as doctors or other authority figures, or anonymous confidants with no separate role in the narrative.

== Role ==
The confidant is a type of secondary character in the story, often a friend or authority figure, whose role is to listen to the protagonist's secrets, examine their character, and advise them on their actions. Rather than simply acting as a passive listener for the protagonist's monologues, the confidant may themselves act to move the story forward, or serve to guide and represent the reactions of the audience.

== History ==
The presence of the confidant in Western literature may be traced back to Greek drama and the work of Euripides. The characters of Agamemnon in Hecuba and Pylades in Orestes serve as confidants, acting as both counsellors for the protagonists and expositors of their character. The role of the confidant assumed particular significance in 17th-century French drama, however, coming to prominence in the plays of Jean Racine and Pierre Corneille. In Racine and Corneille, the confidant became a more complex and partial character—though the abbé d'Aubignac complained that Corneille's use of the confidant was "without grace". Shakespeare scholar Francis Schoff argued that in Hamlet, Horatio serves "even more than the Racinian confidant [as] a mere reporter of events and auditor for the protagonist".

Interpreters such as Georg Lukács have remarked that the role of the confidant has diminished in modern literature, pointing to "the significant absence of the confidant(e) in the isolated situations in which the protagonists of the new drama find themselves", and the eclipse of the relationship of trust that exists between a hero and a confidant by a characteristically modern sense of dislocation and absence.
