= Richard Franklin =

Richard Franklin may refer to:

- Richard Franklin (actor) (1936–2023), British actor
- Richard Franklin (director) (1948–2007), Australian-born film director
- Richard C. Franklin, sound editor
- Richard Penrose Franklin (1884–1942), headmaster of Melbourne Grammar School
- Sir Richard Franklin, 1st Baronet (1630–1685), of the Franklin baronets
- Sir Richard Franklin, 2nd Baronet (c. 1655–1695), of the Franklin baronets
- Rich Franklin (born 1974), American mixed martial artist

== See also ==
- Franklin (surname)
- Richard Frankland, Australian musician and filmmaker
- Rick Franklin, American Piedmont blues guitarist, singer and songwriter
