= Sir Richard Lucy, 1st Baronet =

English politician

Sir Richard Lucy, 1st Baronet (c. 1592 – 6 April 1667) was an English politician who sat in the House of Commons variously between 1647 and 1658.

== Family ==
Lucy was the son of Thomas Lucy of Charlecote Park and his wife Constance Kingsmill daughter of Sir Richard Kingsmill of High Clere, Hampshire. His grandfather Sir Thomas Lucy was an MP and is noted for prosecuting William Shakespeare. Lucy was knighted on 8 January 1617 and created baronet of Broxbourn in the County of Hertford on 11 March 1618. Lucy's brother Thomas was also an MP, while his brother William was Bishop of St David's

Lucy married firstly Elizabeth West, widow of Robert West and daughter of Sir Henry Cock of Broxbourn. Their son Kingsmill succeeded to the baronetcy.

Lucy married secondly Rebecca Chapman, widow of Sir Thomas Playters. After Lucy's death, she married a third time to Sir Rowland Lytton of Knebworth.

== Political career ==
In 1647, Lucy was elected Member of Parliament for Old Sarum in the Long Parliament and sat until 1653 through the Rump Parliament. In 1654 he was elected MP for Hertfordshire in the First Protectorate Parliament and was re-elected in 1656 for the Second Protectorate Parliament.

Parliament of England
| Preceded by Hon. Robert Cecil; Roger Kirkham | Member of Parliament for Old Sarum; 1647–1653; With: Hon. Robert Cecil | Succeeded by Not represented in the Barebones Parliament |
| Preceded by Henry Lawrence; William Reeve | Member of Parliament for Hertfordshire; 1654–1658; With: Henry Lawrence 1654; John Wittewrong 1654–1658; The Earl of Salisbury 1654–1658; Thomas Nicholl 1654–1658; Sir John Gore 1656–1658; Rowland Lytton 1656–1658 | Succeeded by Richard Galston; Rowland Lytton |
Baronetage of England
| New creation | Baronet (of Broxbourn); 1618–1667 | Succeeded by Kingsmill Lucy |
