= Freemasonry in Jamaica =

Freemasonry was imported to Jamaica by British immigrants who colonized the island for over 300 years. In 1908, there were eleven recorded Masonic Lodges which included three Grand Lodges, two Craft Lodges, and two Rose Croix Chapters. During slavery, the Lodges were open to all "freeborn" men. According to the Jamaican 1834 census, that potentially included 5,000 free black men and 40,000 free coloureds (mixed-race). After the full abolition of slavery in 1838, the Lodges were open to all Jamaican men of any race. On May 25, 2017, Masons from around the world congregated in Jamaica to celebrate its 300 years of Freemasonry.
