= Miles Sindercombe =

Miles Sindercombe (died 13 February 1657) was the leader of a group that tried to assassinate Lord Protector Oliver Cromwell during the period of the Protectorate in 1657.

== Early military career ==
Sindercombe was born in Kent and was apprenticed to a surgeon. During the English Civil War, he became a Roundhead and a Leveller. In 1649, he took part in the mutiny of his regiment and when it failed he fled. In 1655, he re-appeared as a member of a cavalry regiment in Scotland and took part in a plot to take control of the local army. This failed as well, and Sindercombe fled to the Netherlands.

== Plotters ==
In Flanders, he met another Leveller and anti-Cromwell plotter, Edward Sexby, in 1656. Sindercombe joined his plot to assassinate Cromwell in hope of restoring the Puritan republic as they saw it. Sexby supplied Sindercombe with money and weapons.

In 1656, Sindercombe returned to England and gathered a group of co-conspirators, including the renegade soldier John Cecil, the apparent conman William Boyes; and John Toope, a member of Cromwell's Life-Guards. Toope gave the other plotters information about Cromwell's movements.

== Assassination attempts ==
First, Sindercombe rented a house in King Street in Westminster, where they intended to shoot Cromwell when he rode past in his coach. However, they noticed that it would be a difficult place to escape from after the attempt and so they abandoned the plan.

Next, Sindercombe rented another house near Westminster Abbey, using the name "John Fish". He intended to shoot Cromwell with an arquebus on his way from Westminster Abbey to Parliament on 17 September 1656. However, when a large crowd gathered outside, Boyes panicked and left, and the attempt had to be abandoned.

Sindercombe's group then intended to shoot Cromwell when he left for Hampton Court, as he customarily did every Friday. They intended to shoot at Cromwell's coach while it webt through a narrow passage. As it happened, Cromwell changed his mind on that particular Friday, and the plotters waited in vain.

The next idea was to shoot Cromwell when he was walking in Hyde Park. They broke the hinges of the park gates to facilitate their escape, and John Cecil began to follow Cromwell and his entourage. However, Cromwell became interested in Cecil's horse and called him over. Cecil lost his nerve and could not shoot him. He afterwards claimed that the horse was ill and that he could not have escaped.

== Capture ==
After so many failed attempts, Cromwell's spymaster, John Thurloe, had noticed the would-be assassins. He had already heard about the plot from his spies on the Continent.

Sindercombe's next idea was to burn down Whitehall Palace and the Lord Protector with it. Boyes made an explosive device out of gunpowder, tar and pitch, and the group planted it in the palace chapel on 8 January 1657. However, Toope, who had had a change of heart, revealed the plan to authorities. When the plotters left, guards disarmed the bomb.

Thurloe gave an order to arrest the plotters. Cecil was easily captured, but Boyes escaped. Sindercombe fought the guards until one guard cut off part of his nose. Cecil and Sindercombe were sent to the Tower.

Cecil decided to tell all. With Toope's aid, Thurloe learned Sexby's part in the plot and presented his findings to the Parliament.

== Trial and death ==
Sindercombe remained uncooperative. On 9 February 1657, he was found guilty of high treason when both Cecil and Toope testified against him and was sentenced to be hanged, drawn and quartered. Sindercomb's sister brought him poison the night before he was to be executed either to spare him the agony of such a death or because he did not want to face the humiliation of execution. He drank it and was found dead in his cell in the Tower of London on 13 February 1657. His body was dragged to the erected gallows and buried beneath it by the hangman. (He was actually gibbeted on Shepherd's Bush Green.)

== See also ==
- Killing No Murder, a pamphlet published in 1657
