= William Hale (died 1688) =

English politician

William Hale (c. 1632 – 1688) was an English politician.

Hale was the son of Rowland Hale of King's Walden, Hertfordshire (High Sheriff of Hertfordshire in 1647–48) and his wife Elizabeth, daughter of Sir Henry Garraway (Lord Mayor of London in 1639–40).

He was admitted to Trinity College, Cambridge in 1649, and to Gray's Inn in 1651.

He was elected MP for Hertfordshire at a by-election in 1669, after Viscount Cranborne succeeded to the House of Lords as Earl of Salisbury. Hale supported the Earl of Shaftesbury in the Exclusion Crisis, voting for the Exclusion Bill. Despite wishing to stand down due to ill health, he was re-elected in March 1679 "contrary to his inclinations". In October 1679, he was again asked to stand, but this time insisted that "if they will choose him, he will not serve, but go travel beyond sea". However, in 1681 he agreed to stand and was re-elected. This Parliament, the Oxford Parliament, sat for only one week; Hale took no known part in it.

He also served as Deputy Lieutenant of Hertfordshire, 1671–83 and 1687 until death.

He died on 25 May (or 25 August) 1688, aged 56, and was buried at King's Walden.

== Family ==
In 1655, Hale married Mary, daughter of Jeremy (Jeremiah) Elwes of Roxby, Lincolnshire. (Their marriage settlement survives.) They had ten sons and four daughters:

- Richard Hale (1659–1689), married Elizabeth Meynell [parents of William Hale MP; Elizabeth married secondly Robert Cecil MP]
- Mary Hale (1660–1709), married John Plumer [parents of Walter Plumer MP, William Plumer MP and Richard Plumer MP]
- Rowland Hale (1662–)
- William Hale (1663–)
- John Hale (1666–)
- Jeremiah Hale (1668–1734)
- Henry Hale (1670–1735)
- Elizabeth Hale (1670–1671)
- Katherine Hale (1673–1704), married John Hoskyns [parents of Catherine Cavendish, Duchess of Devonshire]
- Geoffrey Hale (1676–)
- Sir Bernard Hale (1677–1729), Chief Baron of the Irish Exchequer, married Ann Thursby
- Thomas Hale (1678–)
- Geoffrey Hale (1680–)
- Elizabeth Hale (1682–1763), married Nicholas Bonfoy

Parliament of England
Preceded by Sir Richard Franklyn; Viscount Cranborne	Member of Parliament for Hertfordshire; 1669–1679; With: Sir Richard Franklyn; Silius Titus	Succeeded by Sir Jonathan Keate; Sir Charles Caesar
Preceded by Sir Jonathan Keate; Sir Charles Caesar	Member of Parliament for Hertfordshire; 1681; With: Sir Charles Caesar	Succeeded by Ralph Freman; Thomas Halsey
