= Henry Garraway =

English merchant and Lord Mayor of London

Sir Henry Garway or Garraway (died July 1646) was an English merchant who was Lord Mayor of London in 1639.

Garaway was the son of Sir William Garraway, farmer of the customs. Garraway was a city of London merchant and a member of the Worshipful Company of Drapers. He was one of the Court Assistants from 1614 to 1628 and a member of the committee of the East India Company from 1614 to 1643.

On 30 January 1627, Garraway was elected an alderman of the City of London for Vintry ward. He was Sheriff of London and Master of the Drapers Company from 1627 to 1628. In 1631 he became colonel of the Trained Bands. He was Governor of the Levant Company from 1635 to 1643 and Deputy Governor of the East India Company from 1636 to 1639. In 1639 he became alderman of Broad Street ward, Master of the Drapers Company and Lord Mayor of London. He was knighted on 31 May 1640.

His son was William Garway MP and his daughter was Elizabeth Garraway, mother of William Hale MP.

Civic offices
Preceded by Sir Maurice Abbot	Lord Mayor of the City of London; 1639	Succeeded by Sir William Acton, 1st Baronet
