= William Thomas (MP for Ludgershall) =

Member of the Parliament of England

William Thomas (c. 1630 – 1686) was an English lawyer and politician who sat in the House of Commons in 1660.

Thomas was the son of George Thomas of Savernake, Wiltshire. He was a student at Gray's Inn in 1648 and was called to the bar in 1652. In 1656, he succeeded to the estates of his father. He was J.P. for Dorset from March 1660 until his death. In April 1660, Thomas was elected Member of Parliament for Ludgershall. After a double return he took his seat in the Convention Parliament on 23 May. He was very active in parliament making 26 recorded speeches and serving on 33 committees, of which he took the chair in three. He expressed strong Anglican and Royalist views. He was proposed as one of the Knights of the Royal Oak, with an income of £600 p.a. He was commissioner for assessment for Dorset from August 1660 to 1674 and for Wiltshire from August 1660 to 1661. He became an ancient of his Inn in 1667 and an associate bencher in 1676.

Thomas died at the age of about 55 shortly before 6 September 1686.

Thomas married firstly, in about 1654, Christian Withed, daughter of Richard Whithed a parliamentary colonel of Norman Court, West Tytherley, Hampshire and had a son. She died on 3 February 1655 and he married secondly on 31 March 1659, Dorothy Chettell, widow of Francis Chettel of Blandford St Mary, Dorset, who was a recruiter to the Long Parliament, and daughter of Thomas Tregonwell of Anderson, Dorset.

Parliament of England
Preceded by Not represented in Restored Rump	Member of Parliament for Ludgershall; 1660; With: William Prynne 1660; Silius Titus 1660	Succeeded by William Ashburnham; Geoffrey Palmer
