= Sir Richard Franklyn, 1st Baronet =

Sir Richard Franklyn, 1st Baronet (1630–1685) of Moor Park, Hertfordshire was an English landowner and politician who sat in the House of Commons from 1661 to 1679.

Franklyn was the son of Sir John Franklyn of Willesden, Middlesex and his wife Elizabeth Purefoy, daughter of George Purefoy of Wadley Buckinghamshire. He was baptised at Willesden on 20 July 1630. He was admitted to Gray's Inn on 23 June 1648 and matriculated at Balliol College, Oxford on 19 March 1649. In May 1652 he purchased the Moor Park estate, selling the house to James Butler, 1st Duke of Ormond in 1664 and the Manor of the More to Sir John Bucknall in 1672.

He was knighted at Whitehall on 14 July 1660 and was created a baronet on 16 October 1660. In 1661, he was elected Member of Parliament for Hertfordshire in the Cavalier Parliament.

Franklyn died at St Martin's in the Fields at the age of 55 and was buried at Willesden on 16 September 1685.

Franklyn married firstly in or before 1655 Elizabeth Cheke, daughter of Sir Thomas Cheek of Pirgo, Essex. They had at least one son, also named Richard, born about 1660, who inherited his father's title in 1685. Elizabeth died in 1660 and was buried at Willesden on 21 November 1660. He married secondly on 31 April 1661 at St James, Clerkenwell Eleanora or Alianora Tryon, daughter of Sir Samuel Tryon, 1st Baronet, and his first wife Eleanor Lee. Alianora was sister and heir of the 3rd Baronet Tryon and half-sister of the 4th Baronet Tryon. Their marriage record states: 20 Apr 1661 Sir Richard Francklyn, Kt. & Bart., of Moor Park, Herts, Widr, about 25, & Elianora Tryon, Spr, about 18; consent of father Sir Samuel Tryon, of Halstead, Essex, Bart; at St James, Clerkenwell, or Marylebone, Middx.

They had at least five daughters. Baptised in Richmansworth, Hertfordshire were Elizabeth Isabella (1662) and Eleanor (1664). Three other daughters (c 1665 – 1670) were Essex, Maria and Ellen. The information was taken from the will of Essex Franklyn, who died unmarried in 1739.

Parliament of England
Preceded by Henry Caesar; Rowland Lytton	Member of Parliament for Hertfordshire; 1661–1679; With: Sir Thomas Fanshawe; Sir Henry Caesar; Viscount Cranborne; William Hale	Succeeded by Silius Titus; William Hale
Baronetage of England
New creation	Baronet (of Moor Park); 1660–1685	Succeeded by Richard Franklyn
