= Henry Caesar =

English politician

Sir Henry Caesar (2 October 1630 – 6 January 1668 ) was an English politician who sat in the House of Commons in 1660 and 1666 through 1668.

Caesar was the son of Sir Charles Caesar, by his wife Jane Barkham, and succeeded to the estate of Bennington, Hertfordshire, in 1642. He was admitted at Jesus College, Cambridge, on 10 June 1646 and admitted at Inner Temple in 1647.

In 1660, Caesar was elected Member of Parliament for Hertfordshire in the Convention Parliament. He regained his seat in Cavalier Parliament in a by-election in April 1666. He was knighted on 7 July 1660.

Caesar married Elizabeth (1630 - 1670) daughter of Robert Angell a merchant of London by his wife Susan Bateman, on 6 November 1649 at St Olave, Hart Street, London.

Caesar died of smallpox in 1668 at the age of 37. He was survived by his son Charles who became a member of parliament and his daughter Jane wife of Sir Thomas Pope Blount, 1st Baronet.

Parliament of England
Preceded by no representation in Rump Parliament	Member of Parliament for Hertfordshire; 1660; With: Rowland Lytton	Succeeded by Sir Richard Franklin; Sir Thomas Fanshawe
Preceded by Sir Richard Franklin; Thomas Fanshawe, 1st Viscount Fanshawe	Member of Parliament for Hertfordshire; 1666–1668; With: Sir Richard Franklin	Succeeded by Sir Richard Franklin; Viscount Cranborne
