= The Devil's Whore =

- Genre: Historical drama
- Created by: Peter Flannery
- Directed by: Marc Munden
- Starring: Andrea Riseborough; John Simm; Michael Fassbender; Dominic West; Tim McInnerny; Peter Capaldi
- Composer: Murray Gold
- Country of origin: United Kingdom
- Original language: English
- No. of episodes: 4

Production
- Producer: Company Pictures
- Production location: filmed in South Africa
- Editor: Joe Walker
- Running time: 1 × 1h02m 1 × 53m 1 × 52m 1 × 51m 215 minutes (Full running time)

Original release
- Network: Channel 4
- Release: 19 November – 10 December 2008

The Devil's Whore (released as The Devil's Mistress in North America) is a four-part television series set during the English Civil War, produced by Company Pictures for Channel 4 in 2008. It is about the adventures of the fictional Angelica Fanshawe and the historical Leveller soldier Edward Sexby and spans the years 1636 to 1660. It was written by Peter Flannery, who began working on the script in 1997. It was followed by a sequel series, New Worlds, in 2014.

== Production ==
The series was filmed in South Africa. This caused some negative comment from reviewers but the producers maintained that they had been unable to find suitably "old English" locations in England.

== Cast ==
- John Simm as Edward Sexby
- Dominic West as Oliver Cromwell
- Andrea Riseborough as Angelica Fanshawe
- Michael Fassbender as Thomas Rainsborough
- Peter Capaldi as King Charles I
- Jeremy Crutchley as Toop
- Tom Goodman-Hill as John Lilburne
- Maxine Peake as Elizabeth Lilburne, John's wife
- Tim McInnerny as Joliffe
- Robyn Olivia as Angelica's mother
- Robert Coleman as Angelica's father
- Ben Aldridge as Harry Fanshawe
- Harry Lloyd as Prince Rupert
- Melodie Abad as Queen Henrietta Maria
- Ian Redford as Earl of Manchester
- Angelica Jopling as the young Angelica
- Gabriel Rybko as young Harry
- Robert van Vuuren as The Devil

== Episodes ==
No.	Title	Directed by	Written by	Original release date
1	"Episode 1"	Marc Munden	Martine Brant & Peter Flannery	19 November 2008
Covering the lead up to the war and the battles of Croyland Abbey, Edgehill and Newbury, this episode dealt with the events from Angelica's marriage to her husband's shooting by Charles I's firing squad for surrendering their manor house. Angelica is born in 1623, when England is divided both politically and religiously, a time when political disobedience turned to revolution and civil war, and English history changed forever.
2	"Episode 2"	Marc Munden	Martine Brant & Peter Flannery	26 November 2008
The people of the besieged city of Oxford are in a desperate situation. Devastated by the King's brutal betrayal, Angelica has been cast out of court, and finds herself destitute and starving. Meanwhile, divisions are beginning to split the Parliamentarians.
3	"Episode 3"	Marc Munden	Martine Brant & Peter Flannery	3 December 2008
The country is divided and in shock as Oliver Cromwell puts the King on trial for treason and becomes the first head of the Republican Government.
4	"Episode 4"	Marc Munden	Martine Brant & Peter Flannery	10 December 2008
Sexby and Angelica seek to avenge themselves on Oliver Cromwell. With Sexby arrested and exiled after he refuses to fight for Cromwell, a distraught Angelica agrees to honour Sexby's departing wish and settle her debt with her enemy Joliffe.

== North American release ==
The series was released on DVD in North America in 2011. Retitled The Devil's Mistress, it presents the series as two two-hour episodes.

== Reception ==
Critical reception was positive, though there was some criticism of the omission of some figures and events (such as John Pym, the Earl of Bedford, Sir Thomas Fairfax, Sir Denzil Holles, 1st Baron Holles, Edward Hyde, 1st Earl of Clarendon, Colonel Sir John Hutchinson, Henry Ireton and the Bishops' Wars) and the fictionalisation of others (such as the suggestion that Cromwell orchestrated Rainsborough's death, of Rainsborough not Sexby being a close friend of Cromwell's, Sexby's going to Ireland and the losing of his arm and Sexby's assassination attempt on Cromwell).

Critical reception of the first episode was positive, with Nancy Banks-Smith of The Guardian praising Capaldi's performance and calling the drama "rollicking", "well written and acted" and marked by "a quite serious attempt to explain the underlying issues". The Telegraph also praised Capaldi, along with the lack of anachronisms and the treatment of the era's sexual politics. The Independent called it "bodice-rippingly melodramatic" and showing a tension between Flannery's "desire to get as much real political fact in as he can and the ... requirement that a primetime series should liven up the party with sexual tension and historical glamour". The Times called it "a curious beast – mannered and theatrical, with modern-looking faces speaking period dialogue in an historical dreamscape" and "If not entirely successful, ... the best sort of failure – unusual, brave and fascinating". Another Times critic criticised it for "slightly too much reading history backwards here, almost making Angelica look like a modern woman travelled back in time" and its "frankly unnecessary bedroom scenes ... slipped in, presumably to demonstrate her liberated nature", whilst overall praising the episode as "gripping", "cutting" and "lively" and in particular noting that Simm played Sexby "strikingly". The Radio Times also noted it as "an intelligent, richly textured labour of love". John Adamson, a non-stipendiary by-fellow in History at Peterhouse, Cambridge, criticized the series as "a cartoon-strip version of the Civil War".

== Awards and nominations ==
The series won in the Best Drama Series category at the 35th Broadcasting Press Guild Television and Radio Awards (2009) and Riseborough won in the Best Actress Category. Michele Clapton won at the BAFTA Awards, in the category of Best Costume Design.

At the 2009 Royal Television Society Programme Awards, the series won three awards, Drama Serial, Actor: Female for Risenborough and Writing: Drama for Peter Flannery. The same year, at the Royal Television Society Craft & Design Awards, Julian Court won Lighting, Photography & Camera – Photography – Drama and Nadine Prigge was nominated for Make Up Design – Drama.
