= Lucy baronets =

Extinct baronetcy in the Baronetage of England

The Lucy Baronetcy, of Broxbourn in the County of Hertford, was a title in the Baronetage of England. It was created on 11 March 1618 for Richard Lucy, later member of parliament for Old Sarum and Hertfordshire. The second Baronet, Kingsmill, was member of parliament for Andover, and the second and third Baronets were Fellows of the Royal Society. The title became extinct on the death of the third Baronet, Berkeley, in 1759.

== Lucy baronets, of Broxbourn (1618) ==
- Sir Richard Lucy, 1st Baronet (c. 1592–1667)
- Sir Kingsmill Lucy, 2nd Baronet (c. 1649–1678)
- Sir Berkeley Lucy, 3rd Baronet (c. 1672–1759)

Baronetage of England
| Preceded by Fitton baronets | Lucy baronets 11 March 1618 | Succeeded by Boynton baronets |
