= Max Gerbier =

Haitian painter

Max Gerbier (born 1951) is a Haitian painter. Born in Milot near Cap-Haïtien in northern Haiti, Gerbier typically paints landscapes of the area surrounding his hometown. His paintings have been exhibited in France and the United States.
