= Pratique du théâtre =

1657 book

Pratique du théâtre (English:Theater Practice) is a 1657 book on the theatre by the French author François Hédelin, abbé d'Aubignac. Cardinal Richelieu had consulted him for ideas on unified standards for French stage productions.

Richelieu had asked d'Aubignac to write a handbook for aspiring French dramatists. D'Aubignac actually wrote a series of recommendations for the architecture of theatres, the scenery, the morality of the stage, the seating of the audience, and the crowd control of the audience. The work set the standards for French actors, directors, and producers of its era,
