= Declaration of Lex Talionis =

17th-century event in English history

Early in the First English Civil War the Long Parliament threatened to retaliate in kind if the Royalists tried and executed John Lilburne and two other Parliamentary offices for treason. Lilburne later described this as the declaration of Lex Talionis, (Note: See lex talionis "an eye for an eye, a tooth for a tooth".) and it brought about a practical—rather than moral—mutual restraint by the parties to the war on how they treated prisoners of war.

== History ==
Early in the English Civil War, John Lilburne, a prominent supporter of the Parliamentary cause who because of his radical views was known as "Free Born John", was captured by the Royalists during the Battle of Brentford while serving as a captain in the Parliamentary army. Moves were taken to try him and two other prisoners of war (Clifton Catesby and Robert Vivers), in the civil court of the Kings Bench as traitors. Elizabeth, Lilburne's wife, appealed to Parliament and on 17 December 1642 Parliament stated that it would hold the Judge and officials of the court responsible for the treatment of the three men, and if they were tried and punished would retaliate in kind against Royalist prisoners of war. This lifted the threat to the men and in May 1643 Lilburne was exchanged for Royalist prisoners of war.

Thanks to the declaration of Lex Talionis, in England during the war Royalist prisoners of war were not tried and executed as traitors, but the Parliamentary side were well aware of what could happen if they lost the war, as Edward Montagu, 2nd Earl of Manchester a Parliamentary general said "We may beat the king 99 times, and yet he will be king still. If he beats us but once, we shall be hanged".

At the end of the First Civil War the Parliamentarians allowed English Royalists to return to their homes paroled on terms that they would not take up arms against Parliament again.

After the Second Civil War the Parliamentarians were not as inclined to offer such generous terms and they executed a number of leading Royalist prisoners. On the evening of the surrender of Colchester, Sir Charles Lucas and Sir George Lisle were shot. Major-General Rowland Laugharne, and colonels John Poyer and Rice Powell all of whom had commanded Royalist forces in Wales, were sentenced to death, but Poyer alone was executed on 25 April 1649, being the victim selected by lot. Of five prominent Royalist peers who fell into the hands of Parliament, three, the Duke of Hamilton, the Earl of Holland, and Lord Capel, one of the Colchester prisoners and a man of high character, were beheaded at Westminster on 9 March. Above all, after long hesitations, even after renewal of negotiations, the Grandees of the New Model Army and the Independents conducted "Pride's Purge" of the House removing their ill-wishers, and created the High court of Justice for the trial and sentence of King Charles I. At the end of the trial the 59 Commissioners (judges) found "Charles Stuart, that man of blood" guilty of high treason, as a "tyrant, traitor, murderer and public enemy". He was beheaded on a scaffold in front of the Banqueting House of the Palace of Whitehall on 30 January 1649.

== Irish Catholics were an exception ==
Parliament did not consider this restraint as binding on their treatment of any Irish Catholics who might cross the Irish Sea to fight in England and in 1644 they passed the Ordinance of no quarter to the Irish when it looked possible that the Confederation of Kilkenny would send an army to assist Charles I. The terms of the ordinance as the name suggests decree that no quarter should be given on the capture of any Irish Catholics found fighting for the Royalists in England or Wales (Scotland was another realm and under a different jurisdiction).
