= Franklin baronets =

Extinct baronetcy in the Baronetage of England

The Franklin (or Francklyn) Baronetcy, of Moor Park in the County of Hertford, was a title in the Baronetage of England. It was created on 16 October 1660 for Richard Franklin. The title became extinct on the death of the third Baronet in 1728.

== Franklin baronets, of Moor Park (1660) ==
Escutcheon of the Franklin baronets of Moor Park

- Sir Richard Franklin, 1st Baronet (1630–1685)
- Sir Richard Franklin, 2nd Baronet (c. 1655– 1695)
- Sir Thomas Franklin, 3rd Baronet (c. 1656 – 1728)
