= Edward Sexby =

English puritan soldier

- Born: 1616; Suffolk, England
- Died: 13 January 1658 (aged 41–42); Tower of London, England
- Military career
- Allegiance: England
- Rank: Colonel
- Conflicts: Battle of Preston

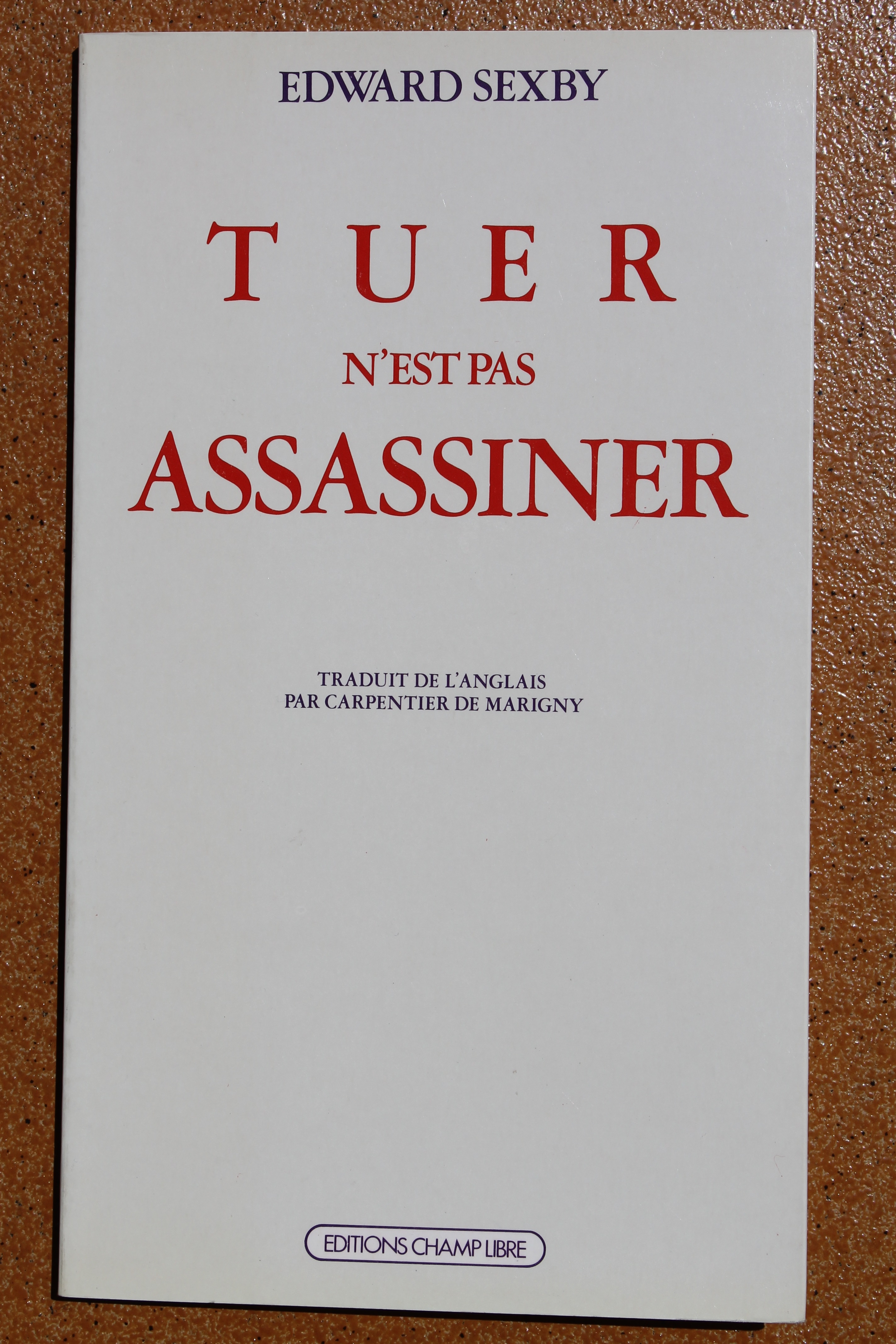
Edward Sexby, Tuer n'est pas assassiner (Killing no murder)

Colonel Edward Sexby (or Saxby; 1616 – 13 January 1658) was an English Puritan soldier and Leveller in the army of Oliver Cromwell. Later he turned against Cromwell and plotted his assassination, which Sexby considered tyrannicide, as a decapitation strike, which would then be followed by a joint regime change uprising by both Cavaliers and Levellers. Failing in his efforts, Sexby was taken prisoner and died in the Tower of London.

== Biography ==
=== Early life ===
Sexby was born in Suffolk in 1616, but little else is known about his life before the English Civil War. Reportedly he was a son of a gentleman, had been apprenticed as a grocer in London, and may have had family connections to Cromwell.

=== Army Service and Agitation ===
In 1643 he was a trooper in Cromwell's Roundhead cavalry regiment (nicknamed the Ironsides).

In 1647, being still a private in the same regiment, which was then commanded by Sir Thomas Fairfax, he took a leading part in the movement against disbanding the army, and was one of the three soldiers charged with the letter from the army to their generals which Skippon brought before the House of Commons on 30 April 1647. He became one of the leaders of the "Agitators", and acted as their chief spokesman in the Putney Debates of the Army Council in October 1647. In the debates, he drew a distinction between property ownership and political liberty:

We have engaged in this kingdom and ventured our lives, and it was all for this: to recover our birthrights and privileges as Englishmen; and by the arguments urged there is none. There are many thousands of us soldiers that have ventured our lives; we have had little propriety in the kingdom as to our estates, yet we have had a birthright. But it seems now, except a man hath a fixed estate in this kingdom, he hath no right in this kingdom. I wonder we were so much deceived ... I shall tell you in a word my resolution. I am resolved to give my birthright to none.

His contributions irritated Cromwell, who complained: "I confess I was most dissatisfied with that I heard Mr Sexby speak, of any man here, because it did savor so much of will." His speeches were vigorous and effective, opposing all compromise with King Charles I and demanding the immediate establishment of manhood suffrage. He may have been involved in the capture of the king at Holdenby House in 1647.

Sexby appears to have left the army about the close of 1647, but happening to be present at the Battle of Preston, with a letter from the Levellers leader John Lilburne to Cromwell, he was entrusted with a despatch from Cromwell to the speaker of the House of Commons announcing his victory. The House of Commons voted him £100 as a reward. In February 1649 Parliament entrusted him with the duty of arresting the Scottish commissioners, for which he was ordered £20. He was also appointed governor of Portland, is henceforth described as Captain Sexby, and was more than once charged with commissions requiring courage and dexterity.

In June 1650, at Cromwell's suggestion, Sexby was charged to raise a foot regiment for service in Ireland, but when completed it was ordered to Scotland. Sexby, who held the rank first of lieutenant-colonel and then of colonel, took part with his regiment in the siege of Tantallon Castle in February 1651. In June 1651 he was tried by court-martial for detaining the pay of his soldiers, and lost his commission.

=== Mission to France ===
A few months later Cromwell and the intelligence committee of the Council of State sent Sexby on a mission to France. He was charged to give an account of the political condition and the temper of the people. He negotiated with the Prince de Conti and the Frondeurs of Guienne, to whom he proposed an adaptation of the Agreement of the People as the basis of a republican constitution for France, and with the Huguenots of Languedoc. One of his emissaries was captured, and (according to Edmund Ludlow), Sexby had a narrow escape himself. Sexby returned to England about August 1653, and on 23 August 1654 was ordered £1,000 for his expenses during his mission.

=== Plots Against Cromwell ===
Sexby was eager for an Anglo-Spanish league against France, and hoped to obtain the command of the levies which it was proposed to send to the support of the Frondeurs. Cromwell's abandonment of the projects against France, and still more his assumption of The Protectorate, caused a breach with Sexby, who allied himself with other disaffected republicans, disseminated Samizdat pamphlets denouncing the Protector, and took a leading part in the planning for a regime change uprising of both royalists and levellers in the spring of 1655. In February 1655 Cromwell's officers in the west of England were in hot pursuit of Sexby, but he succeeded in escaping to Flanders. At Antwerp he made the acquaintance of Colonel Robert Phelips and other royalists, to whom he described Cromwell as a false, perjured rogue, and affirmed that, if proper security for popular liberties were given, he would be content to see Charles II and the House of Stuart restored.

Sexby also sought an interview with Count Fuensaldaña, second in command of the Spanish Royal Army in the Spanish Netherlands, to whom he revealed all he knew of Cromwell's foreign plans and of the expedition to the West Indies, and from whom he asked a supply of money and the assistance of some of the Irish troops in the Spanish service to raise an insurrection in England. Fuensaldanha sent Sexby to Spain that his proposals might be considered by the Spanish council (June 1655), and he returned again about December with supplies of money and conditional promises of support. Father Peter Talbot, who acted as interpreter in Sexby's dealings with Fuensaldanha, communicated his proposals to Charles II, urging the King to come to an agreement with Spain, and to use Sexby and his party. In December 1656 Sexby presented a paper of proposals to Don John of Austria, offering to raise a regime change uprising in England, and requesting a thousand Irish foot and four hundred horses (for which he undertook to provide troopers). The royalists were to assist, but he stipulated "that no mention be made of the king before such time Cromwell be destroyed, and till then the royalists that shall take arms shall speak of nothing but the liberty of the country, according to the declaration whereof I have spoken with the King of England's ministers".

The Protector's government through its agents abroad was kept well informed of Sexby's negotiations with Spain, and a number of his intercepted letters, written under the assumed names of "Brookes" and "Hungerford", were in its hands. In Cromwell's speech at the opening of the Second Protectorate Parliament (17 September 1656), he informed them of Sexby's plot, terming him "a wretched creature, an apostate from religion and all honesty". The assassination of Cromwell was an essential preliminary to the success of the rising. Sexby sent over "strange engines" for the purpose, but his agents missed their opportunities, and in January 1657 an attempt to fire the Palace of Whitehall led to the arrest of their leader, Miles Sindercombe. Still confident, Sexby devised new plots. "Be not discouraged", he wrote to Father Talbot, "for so long as Sexby lives there is no danger but Cromwell shall have his hands full, and I hope his heart ere long, for I have more irons in the fire for Cromwell than one. … Either I or Cromwell must perish".

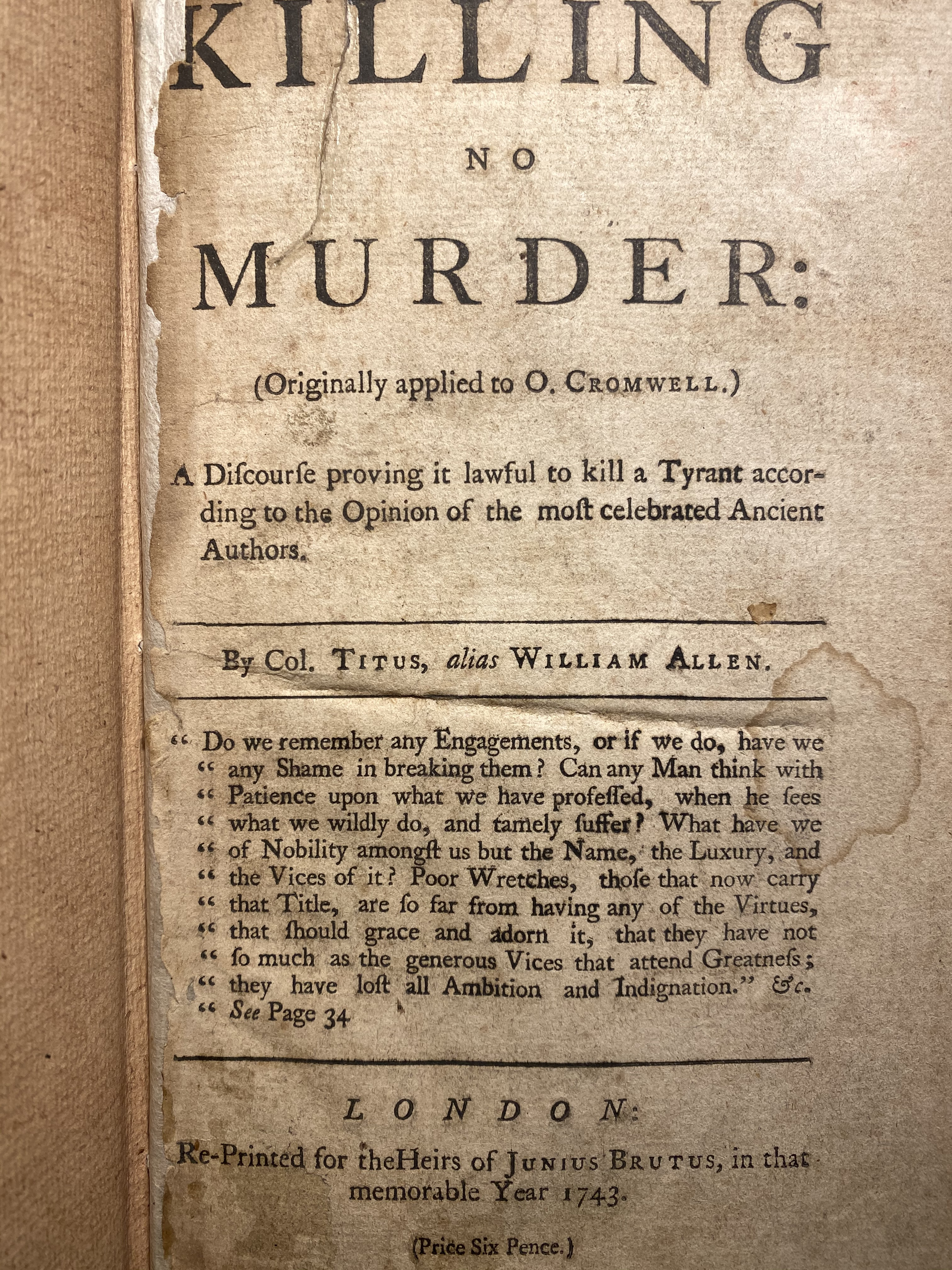
Early printing of document

==== Killing No Murder ====
A few months after the arrest of Sindercombe, an apology for tyrannicide, entitled Killing No Murder—which was dedicated to Cromwell—arrived in England from Holland. It was published by Sexby, probably with the assistance of Silius Titus, under the name of a former Army agitator called William Allen.

The first section read:

"To his Highness, Oliver Cromwell. To your Highness justly belongs the Honour of dying for the people, and it cannot choose but be unspeakable consolation to you in the last moments of your life to consider with how much benefit to the world you are like to leave it."

In the work, Sexby argued that Cromwell was a tyrant on par with Caligula and Nero and that his rule was an inherent violation of the law. He posited that as tyranny was a subversion of the law, 'tyrannicide' could be regarded as lawful.

Killing No Murder was answered by Michael Hawke of the Middle Temple in Killing is Murder, and no Murder: or An exercitation concerning a scurrilous pamphlet, of one William Allen, a Jesuitical impostor, intituled Killing No Murder, London, Printed for the author, 1657. Sexby's authorship of the former is proved by internal evidence, and by his own confession made in the Tower. Captain Silius Titus, who was intimate with Sexby and may perhaps have assisted him in writing it, repudiated him after the Restoration. (Note: Killing no Murder was reprinted in the Harleian Miscellany, ed. Park, iv. 289, and by Professor Henry Morley in his Famous Pamphlets.)

=== Arrest and Death ===
In June 1657, Sexby followed the pamphlet to England, to concert measures for carrying out the principles of Killing No Murder, and on 24 July, just as he was embarking for Flanders again, he was arrested "in a mean habit disguised as a countryman". He died in the Tower on 13 January 1658, "having been a while distracted in his mind and long sick". His body was buried in the cemetery near the Tower chapel two days later.

== Family ==
His wife visited him during his imprisonment in the Tower, but no other information about her has been found.

== Fictional portrayals ==
A character based on Sexby was portrayed by John Simm in the 2008 television drama The Devil's Whore, with several significant changes to the facts of his biography.

Sexby appears in the novel Rebels and Traitors by Lindsey Davis.

Sexby also appears as a character in the 1976 play by Caryl Churchill, Light Shining in Buckinghamshire, as a participant in the Putney Debates.
