= Freeborn =

Descriptor for persons with rights; originates in John Lilburne's work

"Freeborn" is a term associated with political agitator John Lilburne (1614–1657), a member of the Levellers, a 17th-century English political movement. As a word, "freeborn" means born free, rather than in slavery or bondage or vassalage. Lilburne argued for basic human rights that he termed "freeborn rights", which he defined as being rights that every human being is born with, as opposed to rights bestowed by government or by human law. John Lilburne's concept of freeborn rights, and the writings of Richard Overton another Leveller, may have influenced the concept of unalienable rights, (Life, Liberty and the pursuit of Happiness.) mentioned in the United States Declaration of Independence.

Other historians, according to Edward Ashbee, consider that it was not the tradition of "Freeborn Englishmen", as espoused by Lilburne, Overton, John Milton and John Locke, that was the major influence on the concept of unalienable rights in the United States Declaration of Independence, but rather "an attempt to recreate 'civic republicanism' established in classical Greece and Rome".

== See also ==
- The "Rights of Englishmen", claimed by the revolutionary American colonists
