= Killing No Murder =

1657 pamphlet by William Allen

Photo of the French edition of Killing No Murder

Killing No Murder is a 1657 pamphlet of disputed authorship that advocates for the assassination of Oliver Cromwell. Published durning The Protectorate period of the English Interregnum, it was in high demand at the time of its distribution, and Cromwell was said to have been so disturbed after its publication that he never spent more than two nights in the same place and always took extreme precaution in planning his travel.

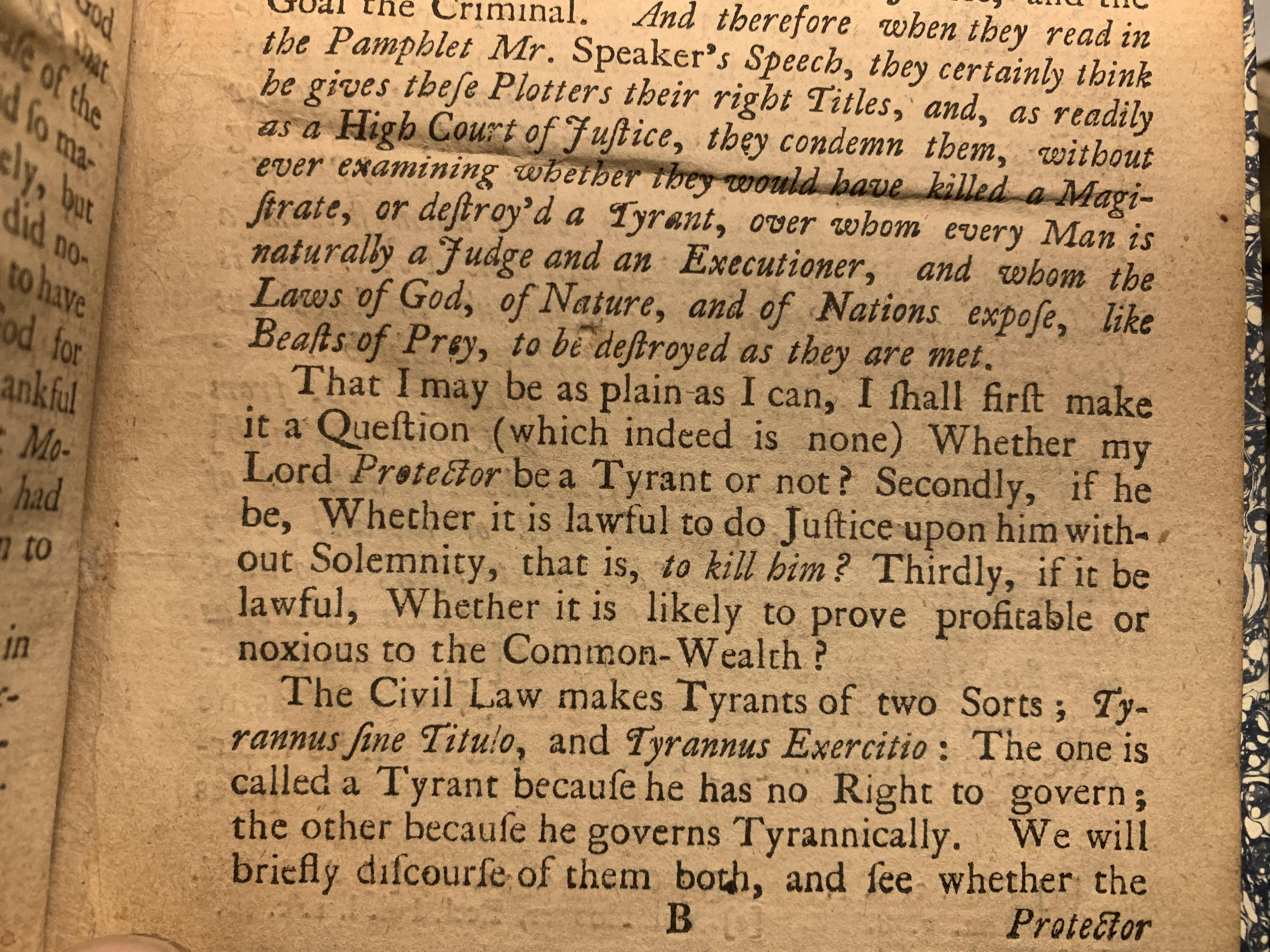
'Killing, No Murder' asks three questions, which highlight the purpose of the document (from page 9 of the 1743 re-print)

The pamphlet offers a definition of the political roles of tyrants, and highlights the military background of historical tyrants as many of them were former generals or military officers. It also highlights that tyrants use religion to their advantage, claiming divine inspiration for their policies, while also claiming that their love of God and religion justifies whatever policy they support. The author claims that since tyrants place themselves above the law and acknowledge no legal limit to their own authority, they have no actual right to the protections provided by the law. When the courts of law fail to act against the tyrants, the matter has to be resolved by vigilantism (defined as street justice in the pamphlet).

The author of the pamphlet used the pseudonym William Allen, and his identity is uncertain. The disputes over the identity of the writer have mainly focused on three candidates: the politician Silius Titus (because the sarcasm in the pamphlet resembled his public arguments), the failed assassin and supposedly insane prisoner Edward Sexby (due to a coerced confession of having written it), and the Republican soldier William Allen (a New Model Army trooper who had previous political disputes with Cromwell).

== Contents ==
The pamphlet asks three questions, which highlight the purpose of the document (from page 9 of the 1743 re-print):

1. What is a Tyrant?
2. Is it honourable to kill a tyrant?
3. Will the outcome of killing a tyrant be beneficial to the state?

The author(s) of the pamphlet highlight arguments and statements from Aristotle, Plato, Plutarch, Solon's law, Xenophon, Cicero, the Bible, and other historical writings, as well as contemporaries from the 17th century (e.g., Hugo Grotius) to make the case that to murder a tyrant is (and has forever been) an honourable act. The full document describes the traits of a tyrant in 14 points, of which the most prevailing are:

1. Prior military leadership service—tyrants are often former captains or generals, which allows them to assume a degree of honour, loyalty, and reputability regarding matters of state
2. Fraud over force—most tyrants are likely to manipulate their way into supreme power rather than force it militarily
3. Defamation and/or disbanding of formerly respectable persons, intellectuals, or institutions, and the discouragement of refined thinking or public involvement in state affairs
4. Absence or minimalisation of collective input, bargaining, or debate (assemblies, conferences, etc.)
5. Amplification of military activity for the purposes of public distraction, raising new levies, or opening future business pathways
6. Tit-for-tat symbiosis in domestic relations: e.g. finding religious ideas permissible insofar as they are useful and flattering of the tyrant; finding aristocrats or the nobility laudable & honourable insofar as they are compliant with the will of the tyrant or in service of the tyrant, etc.
7. Pretenses toward inspiration from God
8. Pretenses toward a love of God and religion
9. Grow or maintain public impoverishment or instability as a way of removing the efficacy of the people's will

"First, therefore, 'a Usurper that by only force possesses himself of government, and by force only keep it, is yet in the state of war with every man,' says the learned Grotius, 'and therefore everything is lawful against him that is lawful against an open enemy, whom every private man hath a right to kill.'"

Other key points:

-As one who submits to no law, a tyrant is not an entity *of* the state so much as an entity outside of it, or above it. As such, a tyrant should not have the protections due through law, or any defence from law since the tyrant acknowledges no laws dictating his own actions. "He that flies justice in the courts, must expect justice in the streets."

== Possible authors ==
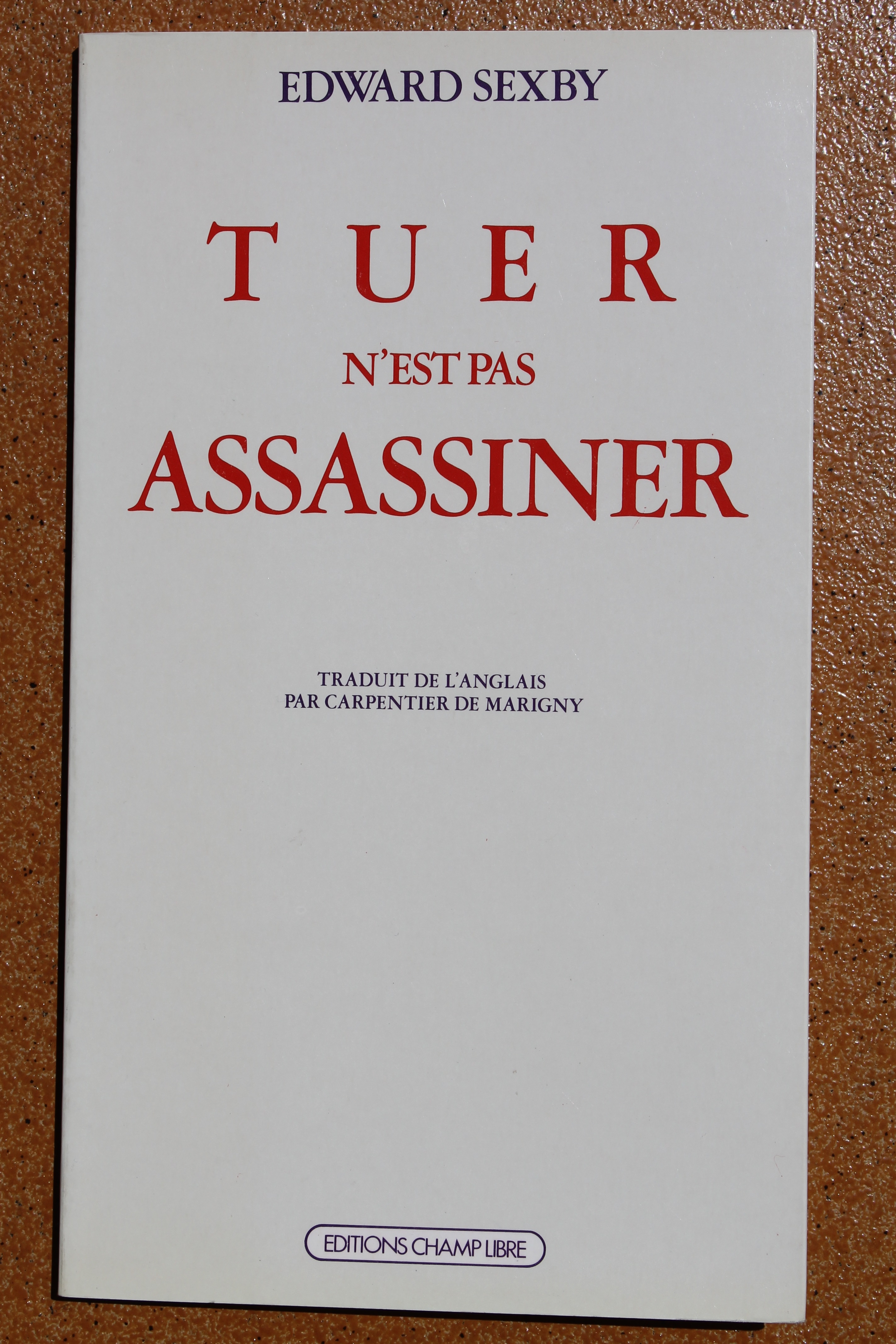
Tuer n'est pas assassiner, French edition in 1980 by Champ libre. Guy Debord wrote a short foreword for this edition.

Killing No Murder was published under the pseudonym 'William Allen' but the authorship is largely attributed to one of three individuals or some combination of the three. The individuals generally attributed with authorship are (in order): Colonel Silius Titus, Edward Sexby or William Allen.

=== Silius Titus ===
Colonel Titus was a politician and one of two individuals who claimed authorship of the work. Titus' claim could stand on its own merit due to the highly sarcastic nature of the document—a trait often attributed to Titus. In response to claims that he often "made sport of the House" and didn't take matters seriously, Titus remarked that things were not to be taken seriously simply because they were dull. Titus' tone can be seen throughout the document and on that alone, many attribute the work to him before he admitted to writing it. Additionally, Charles II of England awarded Titus the title of Gentleman of the Bedchamber for his service in authoring the work.

=== Edward Sexby ===
Edward Sexby had returned to England to try where Miles Sindercombe had failed in exacting the call for assassination found in Killing No Murder. After failing, he was caught trying to escape to Amsterdam and was imprisoned in the Tower of London. It was there that Sexby went insane and died a year later in 1658. Before his death, he was coerced by Sir John Barkstead to admit his participation in the writing of the pamphlet.

=== William Allen ===
While it was often assumed that the document was written under a pseudonym, another theory suggested that William Allen, a former New Model Army trooper and Republican who had ties with Edward Sexby and Thomas Sheppard, had penned the document. The trio (Allen, Sexby and Sheppard) had agitated Cromwell in the past by expressing their concerns about the Army's attitude toward Parliament. It is possible that Allen, therefore, wrote the document brazenly himself before he died but is more likely named as the author as retribution from one of the other two authors.
