= Charles Stuart, that man of blood =

Epithet for Charles I of England

Charles Stuart, that man of blood was a phrase used by Independents, during the English Civil War to describe King Charles I.

The phrase is derived from the Bible:

And thus said Shimei when he cursed, Come out, come out, thou bloody man, and thou man of Belial: The LORD hath returned upon thee all the blood of the house of Saul, in whose stead thou hast reigned; and the LORD hath delivered the kingdom into the hand of Absalom thy son: and, behold, thou art taken in thy mischief, because thou art a bloody man.

— King James Bible 2 Samuel 16:7,8.

This and another verse were used to justify regicide:

So ye shall not pollute the land wherein ye are: for blood it defileth the land: and the land cannot be cleansed of the blood that is shed therein, but by the blood of him that shed it.

— King James Bible Numbers 35:33.

== Windsor Castle prayer meeting ==
Although the phrase had been used for a number of years by Independents, it became politically significant in April 1648 during the three-day prayer meeting at Windsor Castle by the leadership of the New Model Army. The Army leadership felt deeply betrayed by the King because they thought that while they had been negotiating in good faith he had duplicitously gone behind their backs in making The Engagement with the Scots and encouraging a new civil war. At the end of the meeting the Grandees of the Army accepted that it was their duty "to call Charles Stuart, that man of blood, to an account for that blood he had shed, and mischief he had done".

== See also ==
- High Court of Justice for the trial of Charles I
