= Silius Titus =

English politician

Silius Titus of Bushey
- Born: 1623; London, Kingdom of England
- Died: 16 December 1704 (aged 80–81); Bushey, Kingdom of England
- Education: Christ Church, Oxford
- Occupations: Groom of the Chamber, Privy Councillor
- Notable work: Killing No Murder (possibly)
- Opponent: Roundheads
- Spouse: Katherine Winstanley
- Parents: Silas Titus (father); Constatia Colley (mother)
- Awards: Fellow of the Royal Society

Silius Titus (1623 – 16 December 1704), of Bushey, was an English politician, Captain of Deal Castle, and Groom of the Bedchamber to King Charles II. Titus was an organizer in the attempted escape of King Charles I from Carisbrooke Castle.

== Early life ==
He was born in London, the son of Silas Titus, a salter and Constatia (Constance) Colley. He was educated at Christ Church, Oxford, where he matriculated in 1638, and the Middle Temple.

== Killing No Murder ==
Photo of the French edition of Killing No Murder

Titus began his political aspirations by writing a pamphlet titled Killing No Murder in 1657 during The Protectorate period of the English Interregnum era of English history. The pamphlet advocated the assassination of Oliver Cromwell. Due to the danger involved in writing such a politically charged opinion against the Protector, Killing No Murder was published under the pseudonym 'William Allen'.

Cromwell was said to have been so disturbed after the publication of Killing No Murder that he never spent more than two nights in the same place and always took extreme precaution in planning his travel.

Titus's authorship of this pamphlet has been disputed in some circles; it has also been attributed to Edward Sexby, or a man by the real name of William Allen. These attributions are usually unfounded as King Charles II awarded Titus the title of Groom of the Bedchamber for his service in authoring the work.

== Political life ==
Silius Titus first took up arms for the Parliament. Although he was a strong Presbyterian Titus became an ardent Royalist devoted to Charles I and King Charles II.

He became a member of parliament, successively representing Ludgershall (1660), Lostwithiel (1670–1678), Hertfordshire (1678–1679), Huntingdonshire (1679–1685) and Ludlow (1691–1695).

Though not eloquent, he would often illustrate his speeches with a humor that rendered them effective. For instance, when it was complained that Titus made sport of the House of Commons of England, he retorted that "things were not necessarily serious because they were dull". Once again, when Charles II offered to impose limitations on a Roman Catholic Church sovereign rather than exclude his brother from the throne, Titus likened such a plan to "having a lion in the lobby and then voting to secure ourselves by letting him in and chaining him, rather than by keeping him out".

Titus also served King James II but later transferred his allegiance to William III. During his life he held a number of royal appointments: Keeper of Deal Castle (1661–1669), Colonel of the Cinque Ports Militia (1661–1669), Commissioner for Assessment for Middlesex (1661–1663), for Kent (1664–1669), for Leicestershire (1673–1679), for Hertfordshire (1673–1680), and for Huntingdonshire (1677–1680), assistant, Royal Adventurers into Africa (1663), assistant, Royal Fishing Company (1664), captain of a company in the Admiral's Regiment (1666), Privy Councillor (1688), Commissioner for Trade and Plantations (1688–1674), Conservator of the Bedford Level (1679-death), deputy-lieutenant of Hertfordshire (1680–1681, 1687–1689, 1701-death) and Commissioner for Inquiry into Recusancy Fines (1687).

He was elected a Fellow of the Royal Society in January 1669.

When he died in 1704, Titus was buried at Bushey. He had married c. 1645 Katherine, daughter of James Winstanley, Counsellor-at-law, of Gray's Inn and Braunstone, Leicestershire.

== Mentioned in Samuel Pepys' Diary ==
Captain Titus was mentioned in the diary kept by Samuel Pepys on two occasions. The following excerpts come from the entries of those days.

- 7 May 1660

"Very great deal of company come today, among others Mr. Bellasses, Sir Thomas Lenthropp, Sir Henry Chichley, Colonel Philip Honiwood, and Captain Titus, the last of whom my Lord showed all our cabins, and I suppose he is to take notice what room there will be for the King's entertainment."

- 11 October 1664

"This day with great joy Captain Titus told us the particulars of the French's expedition against Gigery upon the Barbary Coast, in the Straights, with 6,000 chosen men. They have taken the Fort of Gigery, wherein were five men and three guns, which makes the whole story of the King of France's policy and power to be laughed at."

Parliament of England
| Preceded by William Prynne; William Thomas | Member for Ludgershall; 1660–1660; With: William Thomas | Succeeded by William Ashburnham; Geoffrey Palmer |
| Preceded by Charles Smythe; John Bulteel | Member for Lostwithiel; 1670–1678; With: Charles Smythe | Succeeded by Sir John Carew; Walter Kendall |
| Preceded by Sir Richard Franklin; William Hale | Member for Hertfordshire; 1679–1679; With: William Hale | Succeeded by Sir Jonathan Keate; Sir Charles Caesar |
| Preceded by Ralph Montagu; Ralph Apreece | Member for Huntingdonshire; 1679–1685; With: Sir Thomas Proby, Bt | Succeeded by Sir John Cotton; Sir Lionel Walden |
| Preceded by Thomas Hanmer; William Gower | Member for Ludlow; 1691–1695; With: Francis LLoyd | Succeeded by Thomas Newport; Charles Baldwyn |
