= François Hédelin, abbé d'Aubignac =

French cleric and theatre critic (1604–1676)

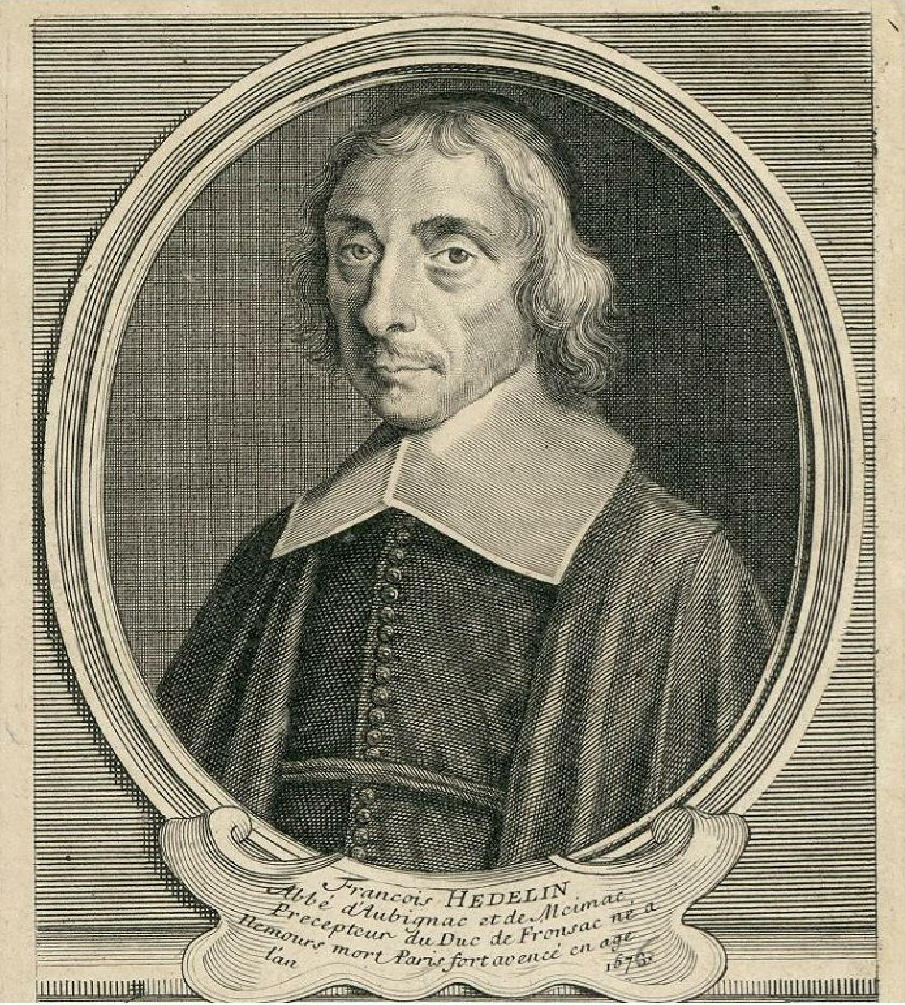
François Hédelin, abbé d'Aubignac

François Hédelin, abbé d'Aubignac (4 August 1604 in Paris – 27 July 1676) was a French author and cleric. He was a grandson of the surgeon Ambroise Paré. D'Aubignac worked as a lawyer in his early life, but he then joined the clergy. He was appointed as a tutor to a nephew of Cardinal Richelieu and secured the patronage of Richelieu himself. After the early death of his student in 1646, he devoted most of his time to literature and the theatre. He wrote four tragedies between 1642 and 1650, but he is primarily known for his non-fiction works on dramatic theory. He also wrote a book which disputed the historicity of Homer.

== Biography ==
The father of François Hédelin was Claude Hédelin, a lawyer at the Parliament, and his mother Catherine Paré, the daughter of the famous surgeon Ambroise Paré. After practising some time at Nemours, he abandoned law, took holy orders, and was appointed tutor to one of Richelieu's nephews, the duc de Fronsac. This patronage secured for him the abbeys of Aubignac and of Mainac. The death of the duc de Fronsac in 1646 put an end to hopes of further preferment, and Ambroise Paréd'Aubignac retired to Nemours, occupying himself with literature till his death.

He energetically participated in the literary controversies of his time. Against Gilles Ménage he wrote Térence justifié (1656); he laid claim to having originated the idea of the Carte de tendre of Mlle de Scudéry's Clélié; and after being a professed admirer of Corneille, he turned against Corneille for having neglected to mention the abbé in his Discours sur le poème dramatique. He was the author of four tragedies: La Cyminde (1642), La Pucelle d'Orléans (1642), Zénobie (1647) and Le Martyre de Sainte Catherine (1650). Zénobie was written with the intention of affording a model in which the strict rules of the drama, as understood by the theorists, were served.

In choosing subjects for his plays, d'Aubignac seems to have been guided by a desire to illustrate the various kinds of tragedy—patriotic, antique and religious themes. In return, the dramatic authors whom he was in the habit of criticizing were quick to take advantage of the opportunity for retaliation offered by the production of these plays.

It is as a theorist that d'Aubignac is still remembered. The credit of having been the first to play so large a part in the history of the French stage belongs to Jean Chapelain; but the laws of dramatic method and construction generally were codified by d'Aubignac in his Pratique du théâtre. The book was only published in 1657, but he had begun writing it under Richelieu's urging as early as 1640. His Conjectures académiques ou dissertation sur l'Iliade d'Homère, which was not published until nearly forty years after his death, threw doubts on the existence of Homer, and anticipated in some sense the conclusions of Friedrich August Wolf in his Prolegomena ad Homerum (1795).

The contents of the Pratique du théâtre were summarized by Ferdinand Brunetière in his notice of d'Aubignac in the Grande Encyclopédie. See also G Saintsbury, Hist. of Criticism, bk v., and Hippolyte Rigault, Histoire de la querelle des anciens et modernes (1859).
