= George Gerbier d'Ouvilly =

George Gerbier d'Ouvilly (fl. 1661) was a Dutch soldier, dramatist and translator. He was the son Sir Balthazar Gerbier, and, like him, had William Craven, 1st Earl of Craven as a patron.

He joined Lord Craven's regiment in the Low Countries, and rose to be a captain. At the English Restoration of 1660 he was residing in London.

== Works ==
Gerbier d'Ouvilly wrote:

- A tragi-comedy The False Favourite Disgrac'd, and the Reward of Loyalty, 12mo, London, 1657, not acted.
- Prosopagraphia, or some Select Pourtraitures and Lives of Ancient and Modern Illustrious Personages, forming the third part of William Lee's edition of Thomas North's Plutarch, London, 1657; translations of biographies from the French of André Thévet.

Il Trionfo d'Inghilterra overo Racconto et Relatione delle Solennità fatte & osservate nella … Incoronatione … di Carlo Secondo … nel terzo giorno di Maggio, 1661, Venice, 1661.

== Notes ==
Attribution

This article incorporates text from a publication now in the public domain: Stephen, Leslie, ed. (1888). "D'Ouvilly, George Gerbier". Dictionary of National Biography. Vol. 15. London: Smith, Elder & Co.
