= Battle of Brentford (1642) =

Part of the First English Civil War

Coordinates: 51°28′42″N 0°18′34″W

- Part of the First English Civil War
Date	12 November 1642
Location	Brentford, Middlesex (present day Greater London)
Result	Royalist victory

Belligerents
Royalists	Parliamentarians

Commanders and leaders
Prince Rupert	Lord Holles; Lord Brooke; John Lilburne (surrendered)

Strength
4,600	1,300

Casualties and losses
Unknown	170 killed or wounded 400 captured 15 guns captured 11 colours captured
- London and Brentford

The Battle of Brentford was a small pitched battle which took place on 12 November 1642 in Brentford, Middlesex, between a detachment of the Royalist army (predominantly horse with one regiment of Welsh foot) under the command of Prince Rupert, and two infantry regiments of Parliamentarians with some horse in support. The result was a victory for the Royalists.

== Background ==
After the Battle of Edgehill, King Charles I captured Banbury and was greeted by cheering crowds as he arrived in Oxford on 29 October. Prince Rupert swept down the Thames Valley, capturing Abingdon, Aylesbury and Maidenhead, from where he attempted to capture Windsor though failed due to Parliamentary strength there. Afterwards many officers wanted to open peace negotiations, contrary to Rupert's desire to carry on to London immediately. King Charles, however, agreed with the officers and as a result, the Earl of Essex was able ready the defense of London with the Parliamentarian army.

== Prelude ==
While in Reading, Berkshire, King Charles decided that the peace talks were inconclusive and that if he advanced on London it would place him in a better negotiating position. So on 11 November he moved his army closer to London by encamping at Colnbrook at the edge of Middlesex and to put further pressure on the Parliamentarians he ordered Prince Rupert to take Brentford midway across the small county.

Meanwhile, the Earl of Essex had rapidly positioned men on the western approaches to London. One force covered the bridge at Kingston upon Thames while another, downriver to the north, barricaded the small town of Brentford, the main crossing of a tributary to the Thames, concentrating their efforts in the proximity of the bridge that connected Old Brentford to New Brentford and the Bath Road (which passes Colnbrook) to London.

== Battle ==
On 12 November under cover of an early morning mist Rupert's cavalry and dragoons attacked the two regiments of Parliamentary foot, one, Denzil Holles Regiment (although Holles was not present) and the other of Lord Brooke, which were barricaded inside Brentford. The initial attack by the cavaliers on Sir Richard Wynne's house, an outpost west of Brentford held by Holles's regiment, was repulsed. So a Welsh regiment of foot were ordered into action by Rupert. The combined force successfully captured the outpost and carried forward their attack into Brentford itself. They drove Holles's men over the bridge into the defences manned by Lord Brooke's men. These in turn were driven out of the town into open fields.

The fighting continued into late afternoon, before the survivors of Holles's and Brooke's regiments were able to disengage under the protection of John Hampden's infantry brigade, which arrived from Uxbridge to cover their withdrawal. Nevertheless, a large number of Holles's men drowned while trying to escape their pursuers by swimming across the Thames. The Royalists captured 15 guns and 11 colours and about 500 prisoners, (Note: Citing Clarendon.) including John Lilburne who was a captain in Brooke's regiment.

== Aftermath ==
Having won the battle the Royalist forces sacked the town. This action encouraged those Londoners who feared for their property to side with the Parliamentarians. On 13 November the main Parliamentary army under the command of Earl of Essex, heavily reinforced with the London Trained Bands and other London citizenry, assemble as an army of about 24,000 on Chelsea Field and advanced to Turnham Green in the vicinity of the main body of the Royalist army.

At a standoff known as the Battle of Turnham Green, the senior Parliamentarian officers not trusting the training of their forces in a battle of manoeuvre chose not to attack, and the King decided not to press his advance on London by giving battle against a greater force. He decided, as it was near the end of the campaigning season, to retreat to Oxford where his army could be billeted over the winter.

Lilburne was the first prominent Roundhead captured in the war, the Royalists intended to try him for high treason but when Parliament threatened to execute Royalist prisoners in reprisal, Lilburne was exchanged for a Royalist officer (the Declaration of Lex Talionis).

Historians Keith Roberts and John Tincey cite Parliamentary propaganda pieces which include accusations of atrocities. One included accusations that the cavaliers used roundhead prisoners of war (captured at Keynote), as human shields — "their cloths [clothes] were shot full of holes but all of them survived unharmed". (Note: Citing a pamphlet entitled A true and perfect relation of the barbarous and cruell passages of the king's army at old brainford published 25 November 1642.) They also note that in another publication of about the same period that Cavalier camp followers were accused of murdering wounded Roundhead soldiers. They argue that "The wide circulation of exaggerated accounts of these events helps to explain the growing antipathy of Parliamentarian soldiers to their Royalist opponents and helps to explain the mutilation of Royalist camp followers after the Battle of Naseby".

== Sources ==
- "Battle of Brentford 12th November 1642". UK Battlefields ResourceCentre. The Battlefields Trust. 2020.
- Atkinson, Charles Francis (1910). "Great Rebellion" . In Chisholm, Hugh (ed.). Encyclopædia Britannica. Vol. 12 (11th ed.). Cambridge University Press. pp. 403–421.
- Roberts, Keith & Tincey John. Edgehill 1642: first battle of the English civil war, Volume 82 of Campaign series, Osprey Publishing, 2001 ISBN 1-85532-991-3, ISBN 978-1-85532-991-1
- Royle, Trevor. Civil War: The wars of the Three Kingdoms, Pub Abacus 2006; (first published 2004); ISBN 978-0-349-11564-1
