= John Lilburne =

17th-century English political activist

Freeborn John Lilburne
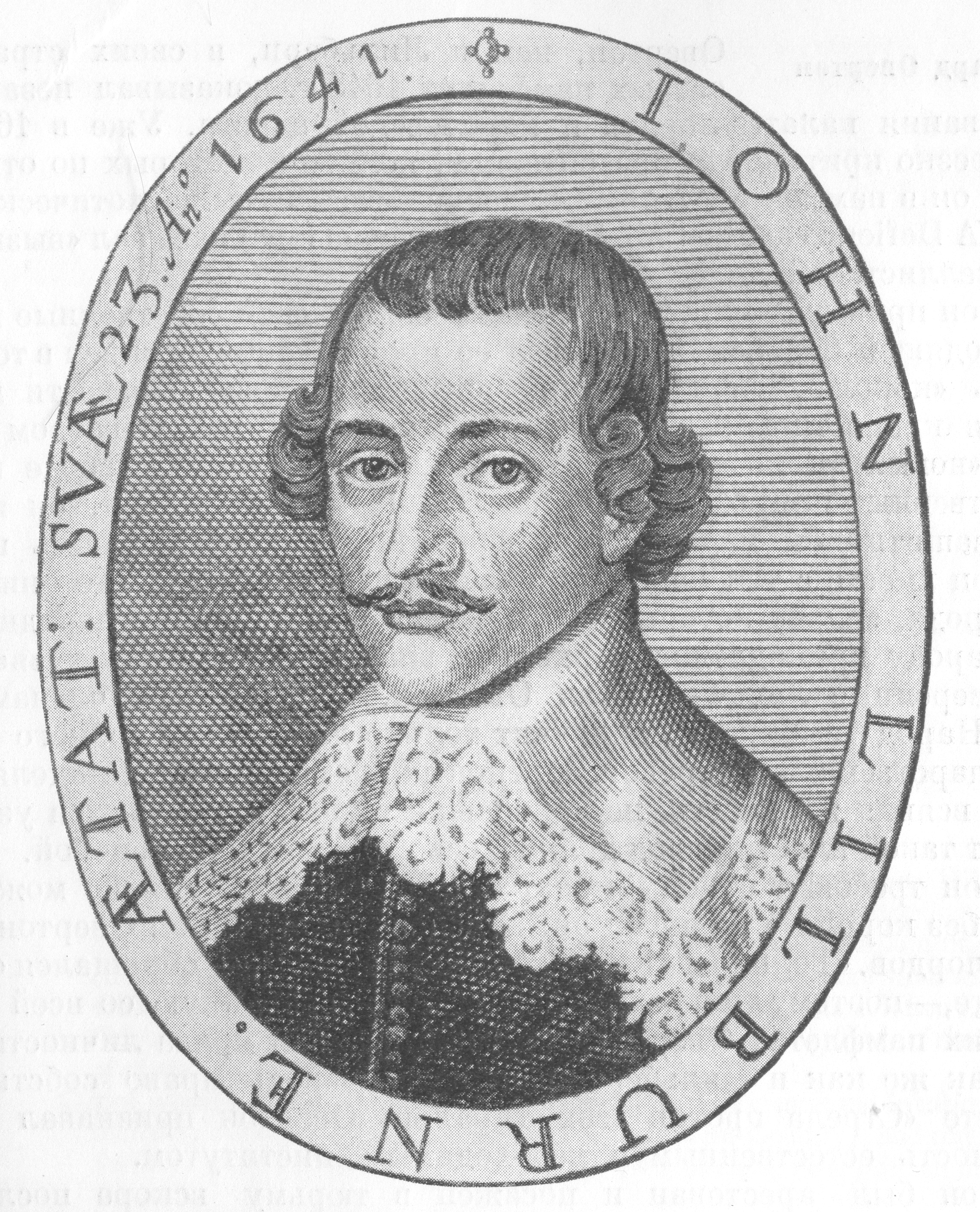
- John Lilburne, a portrait by the engraver George Glover, 1641

Personal details
- Born: 1614 Sunderland, County Durham, England
- Died: 29 August 1657 (aged 42–43) Eltham, England
- Resting place: New Churchyard, Moorfields
- Party: Levellers
- Other political affiliations: Parliamentarians
- Known for: Putney Debates

Military service
- Allegiance: Parliament of England
- Branch/service: Eastern Association
- Years of service: 1642–1645
- Rank: Lieutenant colonel
- Commands: Dragoons
- Battles/wars: First English Civil War: Battle of Edgehill; Battle of Brentford; Battle of Marston Moor

John Lilburne (c. 1614 – 29 August 1657), also known as Freeborn John, was an English political Leveller before, during and after the English Civil Wars 1642–1650. He coined the term "freeborn rights", defining them as rights with which every human being is born, as opposed to rights bestowed by government or human law. In his early life he was a Puritan, though towards the end of his life he became a Quaker. His works have been cited in opinions by the United States Supreme Court.

== Early life ==
John Lilburne was the son of Richard Lilburne, heir to "a modest manorial holding" at Thickley Punchardon near Bishop Auckland, County Durham, and his wife Margaret (d. 1619), daughter of Thomas Hixon. He was probably born in Sunderland, but the exact date of his birth is unknown; there is some dispute as to whether he was born in 1613, 1614, or 1615. His father, Richard Lilburne, was the last man in England to insist that he be allowed to settle a legal dispute with a trial by combat, until Abraham Thornton did so in 1818. John's elder brother Robert Lilburne also later became active in the Parliamentary cause, but seems not to have shared John's Leveller beliefs. By his own account, Lilburne received the first ten years of his education in Newcastle, almost certainly at the Royal Free Grammar School. He also had some schooling in Bishop Auckland.

In the 1630s, he was apprenticed to John Hewson, who introduced him to the Puritan physician John Bastwick, an active pamphleteer against Episcopacy who was prosecuted by Archbishop William Laud. Lilburne's connection with Bastwick, whose "Litany" he had a hand in printing, obliged him to flee to the Netherlands.

== "Freeborn John" ==
On his return from Holland, Lilburne was arrested (11 December 1637) for printing and circulating books, particularly William Prynne's News from Ipswich, that were not licensed by the Stationers' Company. At that time all printing presses and publications were required to be licensed, and publishers were liable to the Court of High Commission.

Upon his arrest on information from a Stationers' Company informant, Lilburne was brought before the Court of Star Chamber. Instead of being charged with a specific offence, he was asked how he pleaded. In his examinations he refused to take the oath known as the ex officio oath (on the grounds that he was not bound to incriminate himself), and thus called into question the court's usual procedure. As he persisted in his contumacy, he was sentenced on 13 February 1638 to be fined £500, whipped, pilloried, and imprisoned till he obeyed.

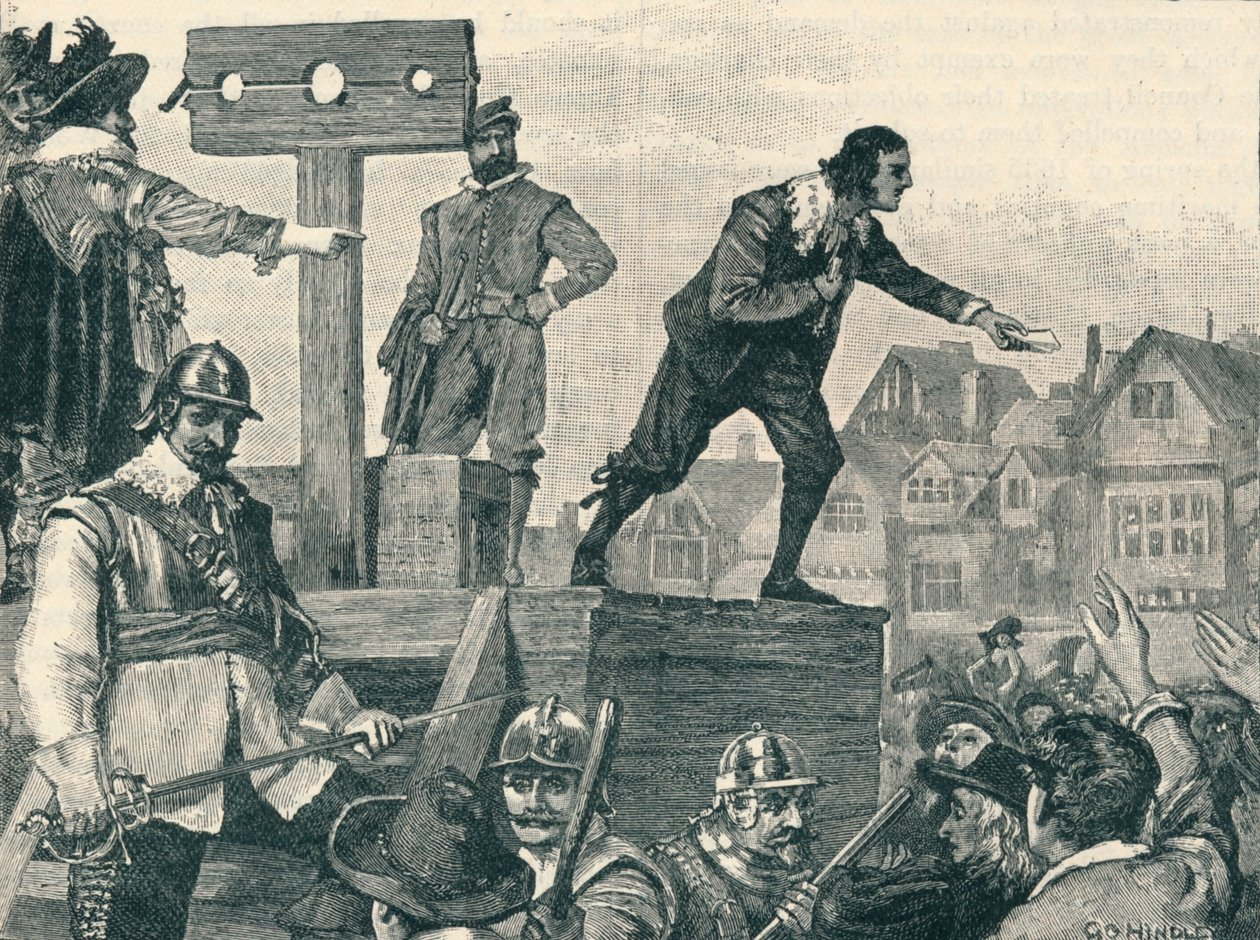
John Lilburne on the pillory at Westminster in, 1638

On 18 April 1638, Lilburne was flogged with a three-thonged whip on his bare back, as he was dragged by his hands tied to the rear of an ox cart from Fleet Prison to the pillory at Westminster. He was then forced to stoop in the pillory, where he still managed to campaign against his censors more unlicensed literature was distributed to the crowds. He was then gagged. Finally he was taken back to the court and again imprisoned. During his imprisonment in Fleet he was cruelly treated.

While in prison, however, he managed to write and to get printed in 1638 an account of his own punishment, styled The Work of the Beast, and in 1639 an apology entitled Come out of her, my people for separation from the Church of England.

Upon his release, Lilburne married Elizabeth Dewell (a London merchant's daughter) in September 1641. Lilburne's agitation continued: the same year he led a group of armed citizens against a group of Royalist officers, who retreated. That was the first in a long series of trials that lasted throughout his life for what John Lilburne called his "freeborn rights", including the right to hear the accusation, the right to face one's accusers, and the right to avoid self-incrimination. As a result of these trials a growing number of supporters began to call him "Freeborn John" and even struck a medal in his honour to that effect. It is this trial that has been cited by constitutional jurists and scholars in the United States of America as being one of the historical foundations of the Fifth Amendment to the United States Constitution. It is also cited within the 1966 majority opinion of Miranda v. Arizona by the U.S. Supreme Court.

== English Civil War ==
In the First English Civil War he enlisted as a captain in Lord Brooke's regiment of foot in the Parliamentary army commanded by the Earl of Essex and fought at the Battle of Edgehill. He was a member of the Parliament's garrison at Brentford against Prince Rupert during the Battle of Brentford that took place on 12 November 1642 as the Royalists advanced on London and, after trying to escape by jumping in the Thames, was taken as a prisoner to Oxford. The Royalists planned to try Lilburne, as the first prominent Roundhead captured in the war, for high treason. But when Parliament threatened to execute Royalist prisoners in reprisal (see the Declaration of Lex Talionis), Lilburne was exchanged for a Royalist officer.

He then joined the Eastern Association under the command of the Earl of Manchester as a volunteer at the siege of Lincoln, and on 7 October 1643 he was commissioned as a major in Colonel King's regiment of foot. On 16 May 1644 he was transferred to Manchester's own dragoons with the rank of lieutenant-colonel.

He became friends with Oliver Cromwell, who was second in command, supporting him in his disputes with Manchester. He fought with distinction at the Battle of Marston Moor in 1644. Shortly afterwards he asked permission to attack the Royalist stronghold at Tickhill Castle, because he had heard it was willing to surrender. Manchester refused, dismissing him as a madman. Taking that as a yes, he went and took the castle without a shot being fired.

In April 1645, Lilburne resigned from the army, because he refused to sign the Presbyterian Solemn League and Covenant, on the grounds that the covenant deprived those who might swear it, namely members of the parliamentary army, of freedom of religion. Lilburne argued that he had been fighting for this liberty among others. This was effectively a treaty between England and Scotland for the preservation of the reformed religion in Scotland, the reformation of religion in England and Ireland "according to the word of God and the example of the best reformed churches", and the "extirpation of popery [and] prelacy". The Scots, he maintained, were free to believe as they saw fit, but not to bind anyone to the same faith if they did not share it.

The historian C. H. Firth argued Lilburne had gained a great reputation for courage and seems to have been a good officer, but his military career was unlucky. He spent about six months in prison at Oxford, was plundered of all he had at Rupert's relief of Newark (22 March 1644), was shot through the arm at the taking of Walton Hall, near Wakefield (3 June 1644), and received very little pay. His arrears when he left the service amounted to £880. He also succeeded in quarreling, first with Colonel King and then with the Earl of Manchester, both of whom he regarded as lukewarm, incapable, and treacherous. He did his best to get King cashiered, and was one of the authors of the charge of high treason against him, which was presented to the House of Commons by some of the committee of Lincoln in August 1644. The dispute with Manchester was due to Lilburne's summoning and capturing Tickhill Castle against Manchester's orders, and Lilburne was one of Cromwell's witnesses in his charge against Manchester.

== Quarrels with William Prynne ==
Besides the feuds he had with officers in the army, Lilburne soon engaged in a quarrel with William Prynne. On 7 January 1645 he addressed a letter to Prynne, attacking the intolerance of the Presbyterians, and claiming freedom of conscience and freedom of speech for the independents, Prynne, bitterly incensed, procured a vote of the Commons summoning Lilburne before the committee for examinations (17 January 1645). When he appeared (17 May 1645) the committee discharged him with a caution. A second time (18 June 1645) Prynne caused Lilburne to be brought before the same committee, on a charge of publishing unlicensed pamphlets, but he was again dismissed unpunished. Prynne vented his malice in a couple of pamphlets: A Fresh Discovery of prodigious Wandering: Stars and Firebrands, and The Liar Confounded, to which Lilburne replied in Innocency and Truth Justified (1645). Dr. John Bastwick took a minor part in the same controversy.

== Agitation ==
Lilburne then began in earnest his campaign of agitation for freeborn rights, the rights that all Englishmen are born with, which are different from privileges bestowed by a monarch or a government. He also advocated extended suffrage, equality before the law, and religious tolerance. His enemies branded him as a Leveller but Lilburne responded that he was a "Leveller so-called". To him it was a pejorative label which he did not like. He called his supporters "Agitators". It was feared that "Levellers" wanted to level property rights, but Lilburne wanted to level human basic rights which he called "freeborn rights".

At the same time that Lilburne began his campaign, another group led by Gerrard Winstanley styling themselves True Levellers (that became known as Diggers), advocated equality in property as well as political rights.

Some recent scholarship suggests that Lilburne's role in the development of radical ideas may be more nuanced than traditionally thought. While Lilburne is often credited with originating key concepts, research by David Como indicates that ideas like the Norman yoke and the supremacy of the House of Commons were already circulating in radical circles before Lilburne began publishing on them. As Como argues, "...celebrated print propagandists were merely collating, synthesizing, and subtly reshaping ideas, programs, and assumptions which they knew from experience were widely shared in the radical parliamentarian circles they occupied." This suggests that Lilburne's contribution lay in systematizing and disseminating these ideas through his prolific pamphlet writing, exemplified by works like The Free Man's Freedom Vindicated.

== Putney Debates ==
Lilburne was imprisoned from July to October 1645 for denouncing Members of Parliament who lived in comfort while the common soldiers fought and died for the Parliamentary cause. It was while he was incarcerated that he wrote his tract, England's Birthright Justified.

In July 1646, he was imprisoned in the Tower of London for denouncing his former commander the Earl of Manchester as a traitor and Royalist sympathiser. It was the campaign to free him from prison which spawned the political party called the Levellers. Lilburne called them "Levellers so-called" because he viewed himself as an agitator for freeborn rights.

The Levellers had a strong following in the New Model Army with whom his work was influential. When the army held the Putney Debates between 28 October and 11 November 1647, the debate centred upon a pamphlet influenced by the writings of Lilburne called An Agreement of the People for a firm and present peace upon grounds of common right.

== Written constitution ==
Lilburne was instrumental in the writing of two more editions of this famous document. The second, An Agreement of the People of England, and the places therewith incorporated, for a secure and present peace, upon grounds of common right, freedom and safety, was presented to Parliament on 11 September 1648 after amassing signatories including about a third of all Londoners.

Following the defeat of the Royalists and the abolition of the monarchy and House of Lords, England became a commonwealth in 1649 with the regicide of Charles I. It was while he was in the Tower of London that Lilburne, William Walwyn, Thomas Prince and Richard Overton wrote the third edition of An Agreement of the Free People of England. Tendered as a Peace-Offering to this distressed Nation. They hoped that this document would be signed like a referendum so that it would become a written constitution for the Commonwealth of England. The United States Supreme Court Justice Hugo Black, who often cited the works of Lilburne in his opinions, wrote in an entry for Encyclopædia Britannica that he believed Lilburne's constitutional work of 1649 was the basis for the basic rights contained in the US Constitution and Bill of Rights.

== On trial for high treason ==
When Hugh Peters visited Lilburne in the Tower on 25 May 1649, Lilburne told him that he would rather have had seven years under the late king's rule than one under the present regime, and that in his opinion if the current regime remained as tyrannical as it was, then people would be prepared to fight for "Prince Charles". Three months later in Outcry of the Apprentices to the Soldiers Lilburne stated that apprentices and soldiers fought to maintain the fundamental constitution of the Commonwealth and rights of the people in their Parliaments by regulating the Crown not against the person of the King.

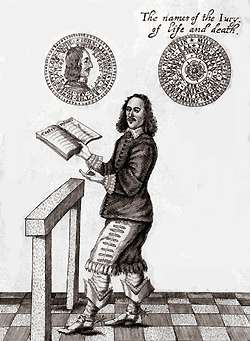
Lilburne reads from Coke's Institutes at his trial.

There had been rumours after the Broadway meeting of January 1648, that Levellers were conspiring with Royalists to overthrow the new republic. During the Oxford mutiny this was confirmed when Parliament acquired a letter from a Royalist prisoner in the Tower of London to Lord Cottington, an advisor in exile with Charles II in France, which suggested that the Royalists should finance the Levellers, as a method by which Charles could be restored to the throne. Armed with this evidence parliament published a long declaration against the Levellers and passed a motion to try Lilburne for high treason, using a court similar to that which had tried Charles I. As in the trial of the King, sentence would be passed by appointed commissioners (forty for Lilburne's trial), but unlike in the case of the King (who had no peers) a jury of 12 would decide Lilburne's guilt or innocence. The trial took place in the London Guildhall. It started on 24 October 1649, and lasted two days. When the jury found him not guilty, the public shouted their approval so loudly and for so long that it was another half hour before the proceedings could be formally closed.

Lilburne was not released immediately and was held for a further two weeks before pressure from the populace and some friends in Parliament finally secured his release. Although some members of parliament were irked at Lilburne's release, Parliament had succeeded in suppressing open Leveller dissent. The Levellers gave up all attempts to rouse the country and army to open rebellion, and started to conspire ineffectually in secret.

== 1649–1651 ==
So far as politics was concerned, Lilburne for the next two years remained quiet. He was elected on 21 December 1649 a common councilman for the city of London, but on the 26th his election was declared void by Parliament, although he had taken the required oath to be faithful to the commonwealth. No disposition, however, was shown to prosecute him. On 22 December 1648 he had obtained an ordinance granting him £3,000, in compensation for his sufferings from the Star Chamber, the money being made payable from the forfeited estates of various Royalists in the county of Durham. As this source had proved insufficient, Lilburne, by the aid of Marten and Cromwell, obtained another ordinance (30 July 1650), charging the remainder of the sum on confiscated chapter-lands, and thus became owner of some of the lands of the Durham chapter.

Ever since 1644, when he found himself prevented by the monopoly of the merchant adventurers from entering the cloth trade, Lilburne had advocated the release of trade from the restrictions of chartered companies and monopolists. He now took up the case of the soap-makers, and wrote petitions for them demanding the abolition of the excise on soap, and apparently became a soap manufacturer himself. The tenants of the manor of Epworth held themselves wronged by enclosures which had taken place under the schemes for draining Hatfield Chase and the Isle of Axholme. Lilburne took up their cause, assisted by his friend, John Wildman, and headed a riot (19 October 1650), by means of which the commoners sought to obtain possession of the disputed lands. His zeal was not entirely disinterested, as he was to have two thousand acres for himself and Wildman if the claimants succeeded. John Morris, alias Poyntz, complained of being swindled out of some properties by potent enemies, with the assistance of John Browne, late clerk to the House of Lords. Lilburne, who had exerted himself on behalf of Morris as far back as 1648, now actively took up his cause again.

Much more serious in its consequences was Lilburne's adoption of the quarrel of his uncle, George Lilburne, with Sir Arthur Hesilrige. In 1649, Lilburne had published a virulent attack on Hesilrige, whom he accused of obstructing the payment of the money granted him by the parliamentary ordinance of 28 December 1648. George Lilburne's quarrel with Hesilrige was caused by a dispute about the possession of certain collieries in Durham—also originally the property of Royalist delinquents— from which he had been ejected by Hesilrige in 1649. In 1651 the committee for compounding delinquents' estates had confirmed Hesilrige's decision. John Lilburne intervened with a virulent attack on Hesilrige and the committee, terming them "unjust and unworthy men, fit to be spewed out of all human society, and deserving worse than to be hanged". He next joined with Josiah Primat—the person from whom George Lilburne asserted that he had bought the collieries—and presented to Parliament, on 23 December 1651, a petition repeating and specifying the charges against Hesilrige. Parliament thereupon appointed a committee of fifty members to examine witnesses and documents, who reported on 16 Jan. 1652, that the petition was "false, malicious, and scandalous". Lilburne was sentenced to pay a fine of £3,000 to the state, damages of £2,000 to Hesilrige, and £500 apiece to four members of the Committee for Compounding with Delinquents.

In addition John Lilburne was sentenced to be banished for life, and an Act of Parliament for that purpose was passed on 30 January 1652.

=== Exile in the Netherlands ===
Lilburne spent his exile in the Netherlands at Bruges and elsewhere, where he published a vindication of himself, and an attack on the government. In his hostility to the army leaders Lilburne had often contrasted the present governors unfavourably with Charles I. Now he frequented the society of cavaliers of note, such Lords Hopton, Colepeper and Percy. If he were furnished with ten thousand pounds, he undertook to overthrow Cromwell, the Parliament, and the Council of State, within six months. "I know not", he was heard to say, "why I should not vye with Cromwell, since I had once as great a power as he had, and greater too, and am as good a gentleman". But with the exception of the Duke of Buckingham, none of the royalists placed any confidence in him.

== Return, trial and imprisonment ==
The news of the expulsion of the Rump in April 1653 excited Lilburne's hopes of returning to England. Counting on Cromwell's placid disposition, he boldly applied to him for a pass to return to England, and, when it was not granted, came over without one on 14 June. The government at once arrested him, and lodged him in Newgate, whence he continued to importune Cromwell for his protection, and to promise to live quietly if he might stay in England. His trial began at the Old Bailey on 13 July, and concluded with his acquittal on 20 August. As usual Lilburne contested every step with the greatest pertinacity. "He performed the great feat which no one else ever achieved, of extorting from the court a copy of his indictment, in order that he might put it before counsel, and be instructed as to the objections he might take against it". Throughout the trial popular sympathy was on his side. Petitions on his behalf were presented to parliament, so strongly worded that the petitioners were committed to prison. Crowds flocked to see him tried; threats of a rescue were freely uttered; and tickets were circulated with the legend:

And what, shall then honest John Lilburne die?

Three-score thousand will know the reason why.

The government filled London with troops, but in spite of their officers, the soldiers shouted and sounded their trumpets when they heard that Lilburne was acquitted. Such was his popularity that two medals were struck in celebration of his acquittal. The government, however, declined to leave Lilburne at large. The jurymen were summoned before the Council of State, and the Council of State was ordered to secure Lilburne. On 28 August he was transferred from Newgate Prison to the Tower of London, and the Lieutenant of the Tower was instructed by parliament to refuse obedience to any writ of habeas corpus. On 16 March 1654, the Council ordered that he should be removed to Mont Orgueil Castle, Jersey. Colonel Robert Gibbon, the governor, complained that he gave more trouble than ten cavaliers.

The Protector offered Lilburne his liberty if he declined to act against the government, but he answered that he would own no way for his liberty but the way of the law. Lilburne's health suffered from his confinement, and in 1654 his death was incorrectly reported. His wife and father petitioned for his release, and in October 1655 he was brought back to England and lodged in Dover Castle.

== Quakerism and death ==
In 1656, he was allowed to leave Dover Castle during the daytime to visit his wife and children, who had settled in Dover. It was here that Lilburne met Luke Howard, a Quaker whose serenity impressed him and began the process of his own conversion. Lilburne declared himself a convert to the tenets of the Quakers, and announced his conversion in a letter to his wife. General Fleetwood showed a copy of this letter to the Protector, who was at first inclined to regard it merely as a politic device to escape imprisonment. When Cromwell was convinced that Lilburne really intended to live peaceably, he released him on parole from prison, and seems to have continued till his death the pension of 40s. a week allowed him for his maintenance during his imprisonment. Later he was permitted to stay away from prison for several days at a time and took to visiting Quaker congregations in Kent.

In the summer of 1657, while visiting his wife, who was expecting their tenth child, Lilburne died at Eltham 29 August 1657, and was buried at Moorfields, "in the new churchyard adjoining to Bedlam".

On 21 January 1659 Elizabeth Lilburne petitioned Richard Cromwell for the discharge of the fine imposed on her husband by the act of 30 Jan. 1652, and her request was granted. Parliament on a similar petition recommended the repealing of the act, and the recommendation was carried by the restored Long Parliament on 15 August 1659.

== Family ==
Lilburne married Elizabeth, daughter of Henry Dewell. During his imprisonment in 1649 he lost two sons, but a daughter and other children survived him.

== Importance ==
Charles Harding Firth, writing in the Dictionary of National Biography, considered Lilburne's political importance easy to explain: In a revolution where others argued about the respective rights of King and Parliament, he spoke always of the rights of the people. His dauntless courage and his powers of speech made him the idol of the people. With Coke's "Institutes" in his hand he was willing to tackle any tribunal. He was ready to assail any abuse at any cost to himself, but his passionate egotism made him a dangerous champion, and he continually sacrificed public causes to personal resentments. It would be unjust to deny that he had a real sympathy with sufferers from oppression or misfortune; even when he was himself an exile he could interest himself in the distresses of English prisoners of war, and exert the remains of his influence to get them relieved. In his controversies he was credulous, careless about the truth of his charges, and insatiably vindictive. He attacked in turn all constituted authorities—lords, commons, council of state, and council of officers—and quarrelsome though he was, it is fair to note that he never fell out with his closer comrades, Walwyn and Overton. A life of Lilburne published in 1657 supplies this epitaph:

Is John departed, and is Lilburne gone!
Farewell to Lilburne, and farewell to John...
But lay John here, lay Lilburne here about,
For if they ever meet they will fall out.

== Images ==
There are the following contemporary portraits of Lilburne:

1. an oval, by G. Glover, prefixed to 'The Christian Man's Trial.' 1641.
2. the same portrait republished in 1646, with prison bars across the face to represent Lilburne's imprisonment.
3. a full-length representing Lilburne' pleading at the bar with Coke's 'Institutes' in his hand; prefixed to 'The Trial of Lieut.-col. John Lilburne, by Theodorus Varax,' 1649.

== Bibliography ==
A bibliographical list of Lilburne's pamphlets compiled by Edward Peacock is printed in Notes and Queries for 1898. Most of them contain autobiographical matter.

== Fictional portrayal ==
Lilburne was portrayed by Tom Goodman-Hill in the 2008 television drama The Devil's Whore. In this fictional work, Lilburne is shown to have died in prison while being visited by his wife, Elizabeth. He was also played by Michael Pennington in the 1981 television play A Last Visitor for Mr. Hugh Peter, and by Gerald Kyd in the 2012 premiere of the play 55 Days.

Lt-Colonel John Lilburne has a regiment in his honour in the Sealed Knot Society (which re-enacts historical battles).

In 1997 the singer-songwriter Rev Hammer released a concept album called Freeborn John telling John Lilburne's story. The album featured musical and vocal contributions from Maddy Prior, Rose Kemp, Eddi Reader, Rory McLeod, members of Levellers, and Justin Sullivan alongside other members of New Model Army.

== John Lilburne Award ==
The Citizens in Charge Foundation honours a person or organisation every month who stands up for initiative and referendum rights in the US.
