= List of MPs elected to the English parliament in 1621 =

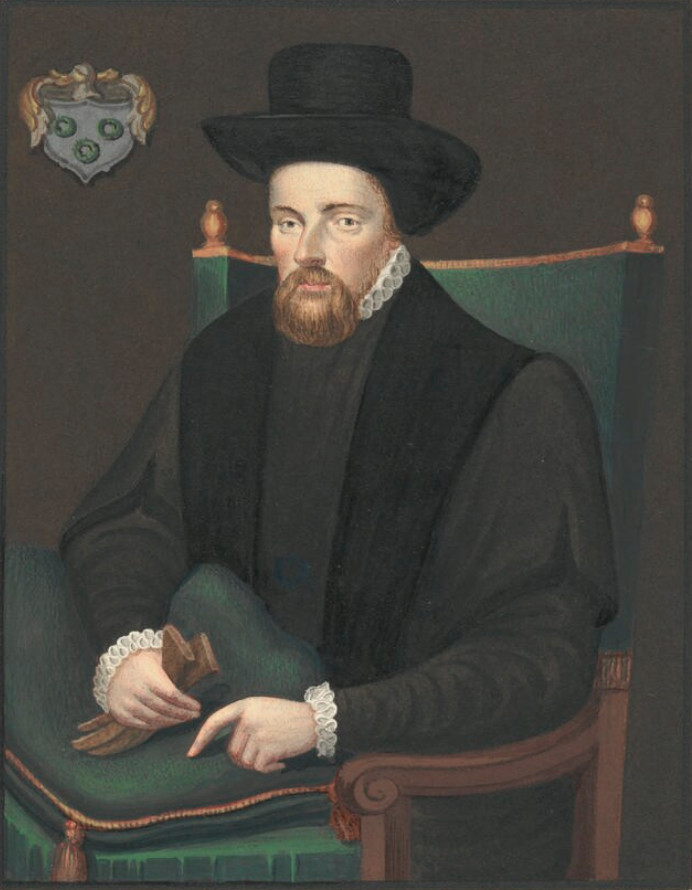
Sir Thomas Richardson – Speaker

This is a list of members of Parliament (MPs) elected to the 3rd parliament in the reign of King James I in 1621.

The parliament began on 30 January 1621 and was held to 27 March 1621. It met again on 17 April 1621 and was held to 4 June 1621. It met again on 14 November 1621 and was dissolved on 8 February 1622.

== List of constituencies and members ==
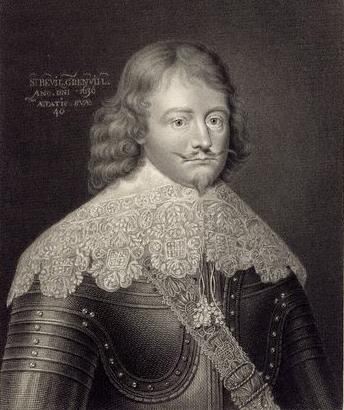
Sir Bevil Grenville, Cornwall

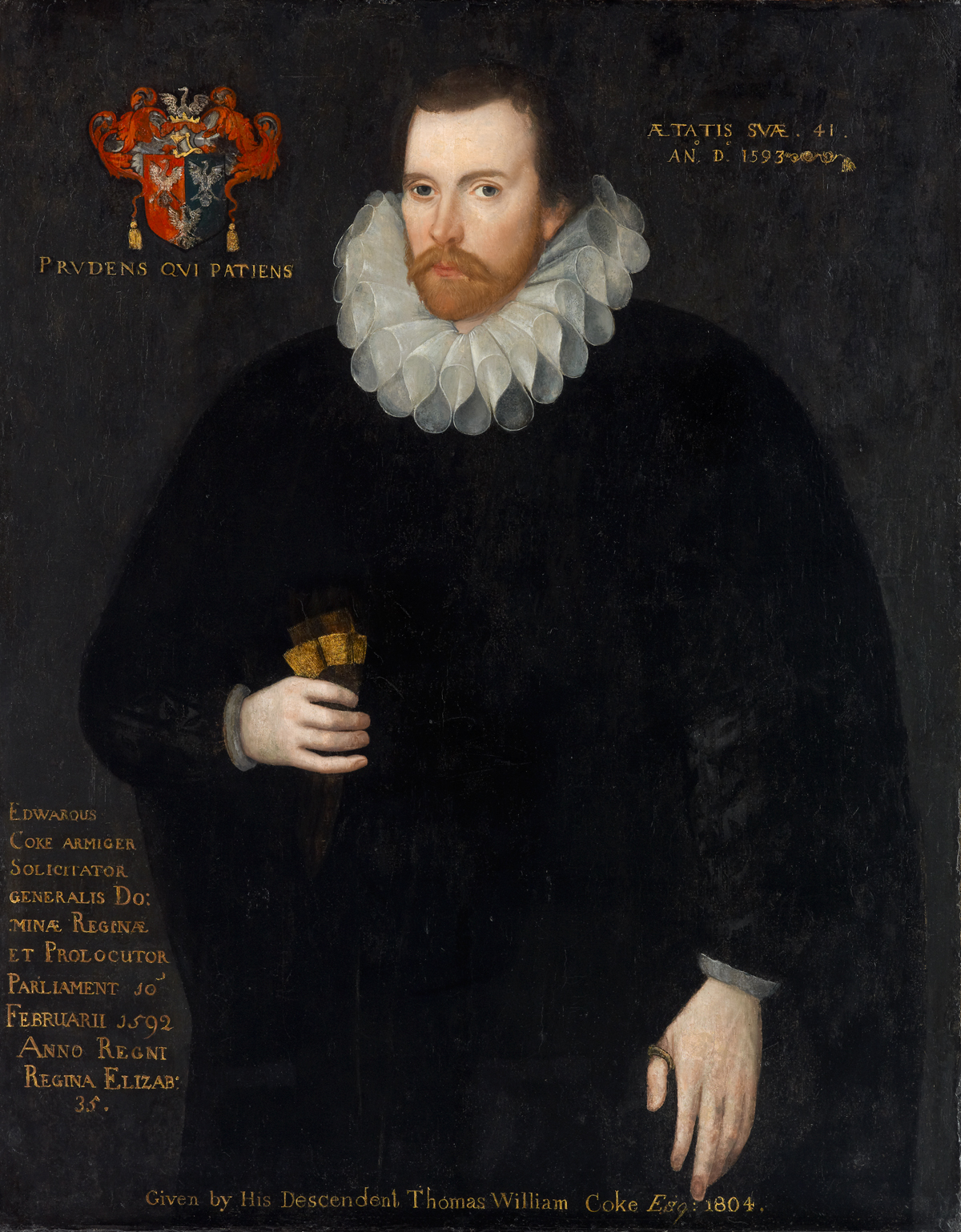
Edward Coke, Liskeard

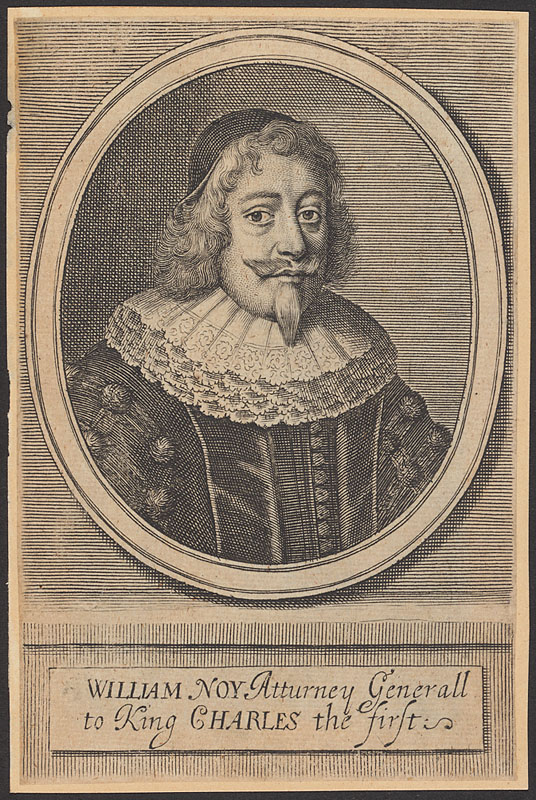
William Noy, Helston

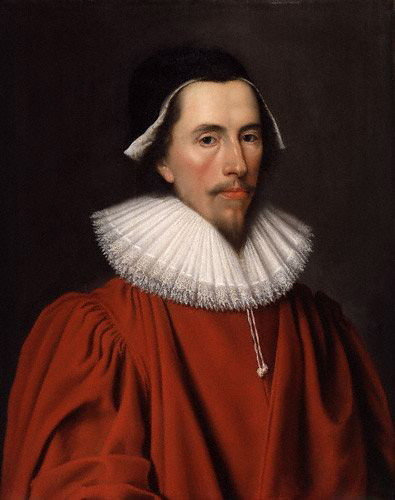
Sir Heneage Finch, West Looe

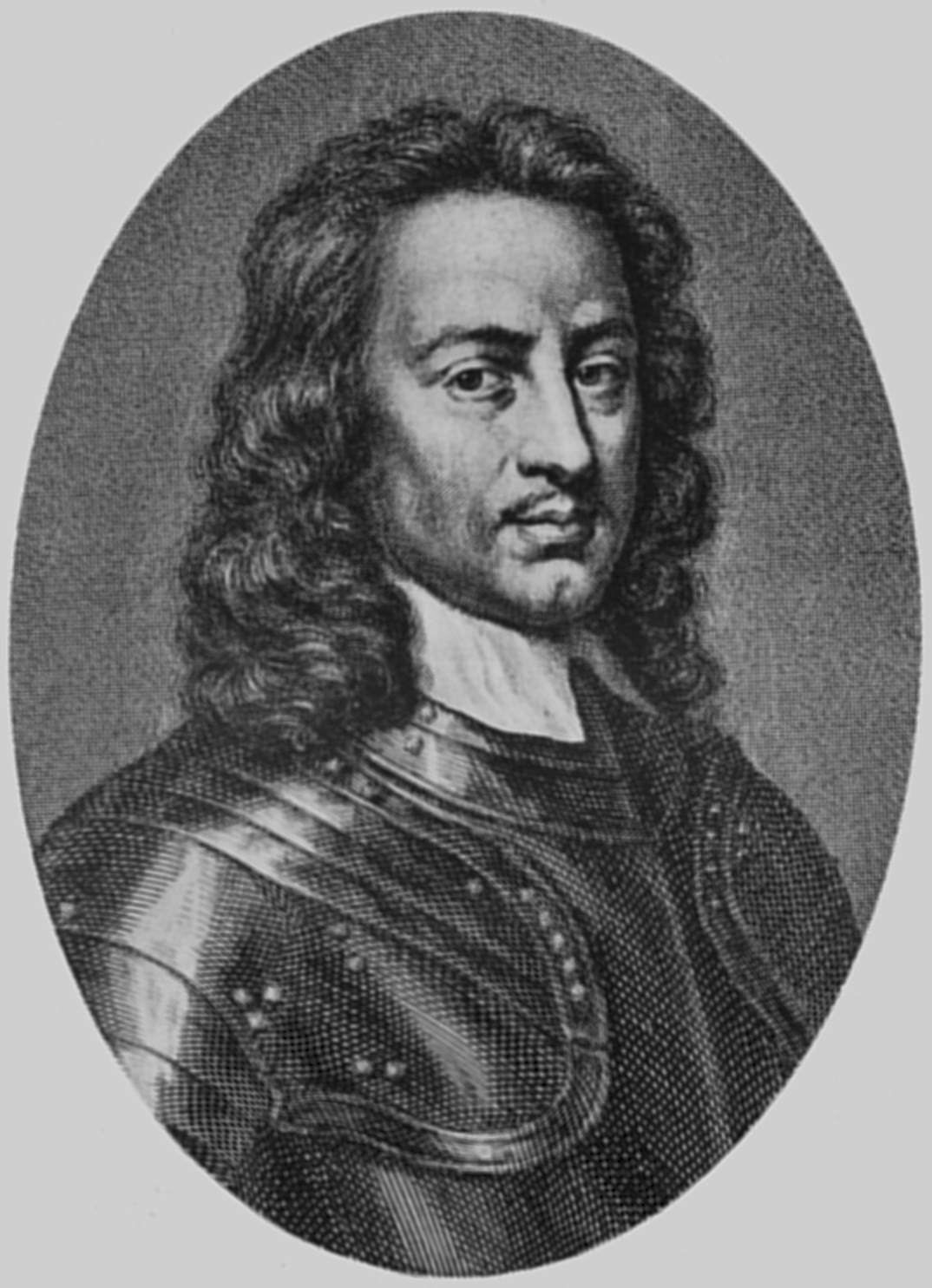
John Hampden, Grampound

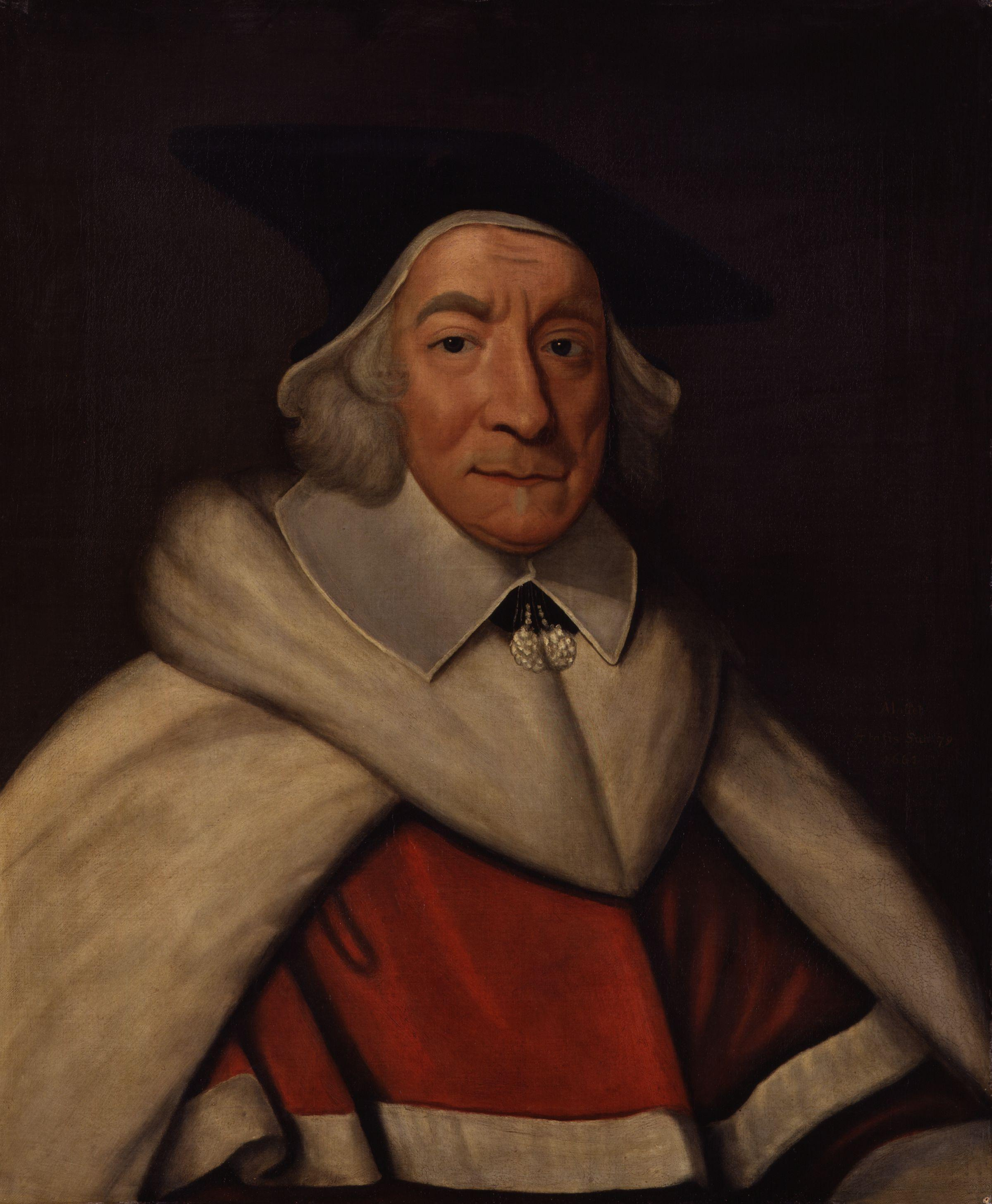
Sir Thomas Malet, Tregoney

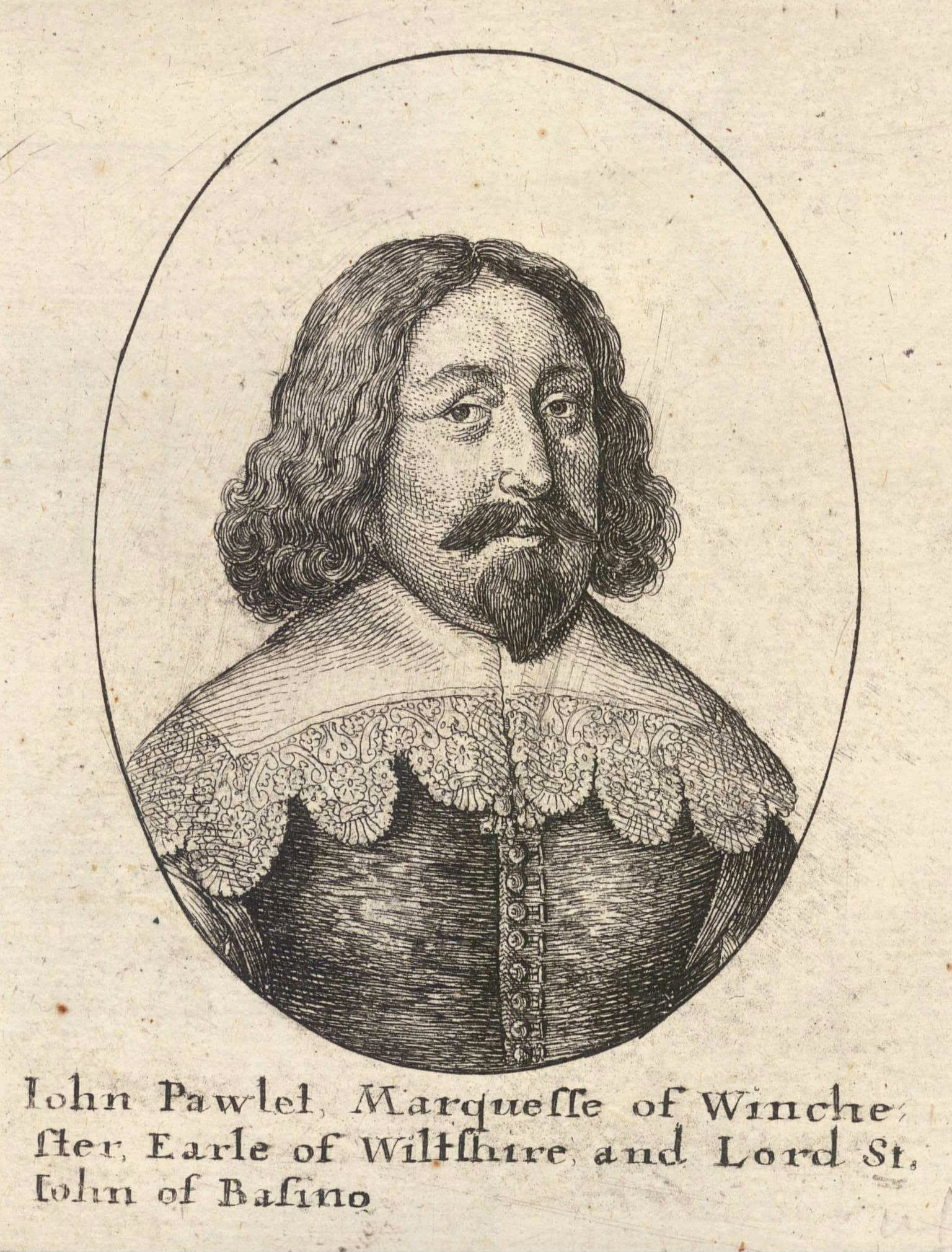
John, Lord Pawlett, St Ives

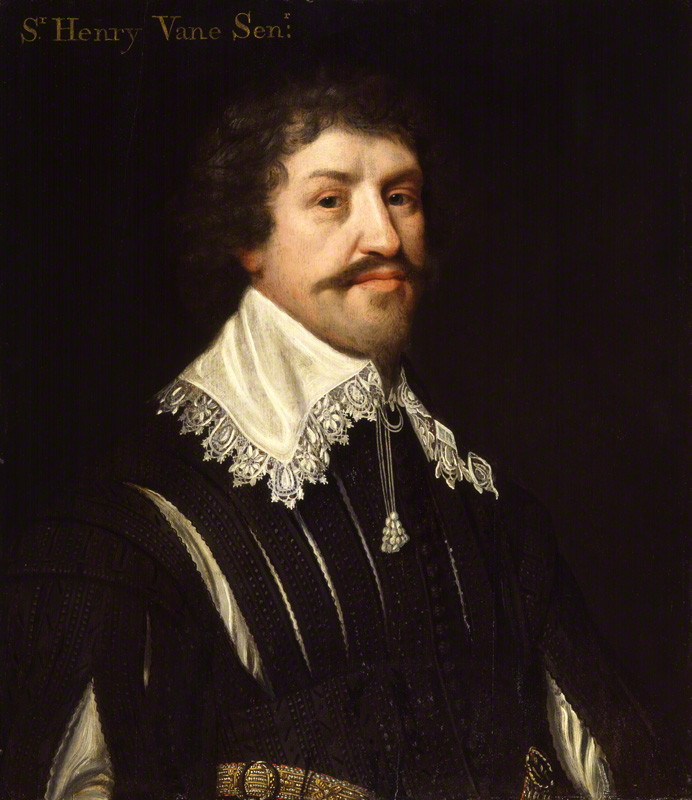
Sir Henry Vane, Carlisle

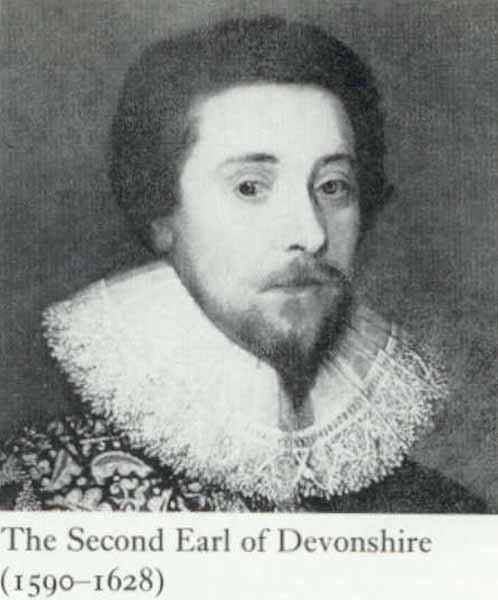
William Cavendish Derbyshire

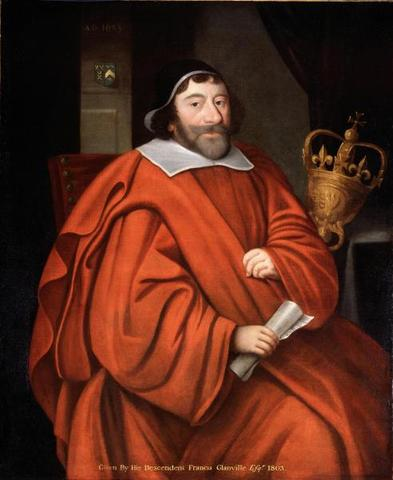
Sir John Glanville, Plymouth

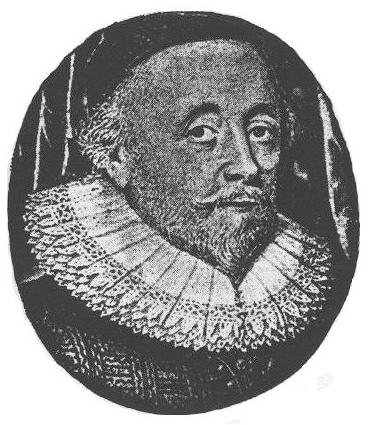
Sir Baptist Hicks, Tavistock

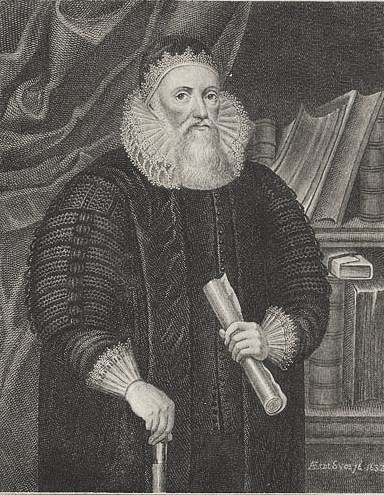
Sir Julius Caesar, Maldon

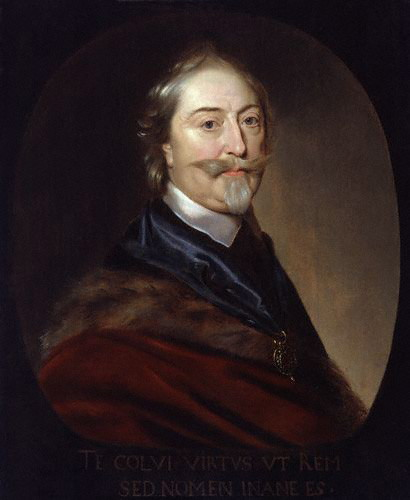
Sir Thomas Roe, Cirencester

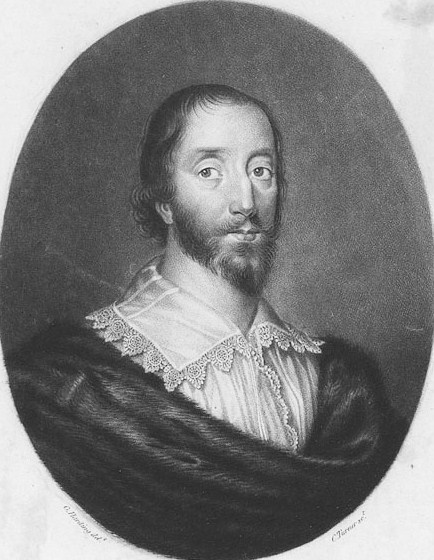
Sir Dudley Digges, Tewkesbury

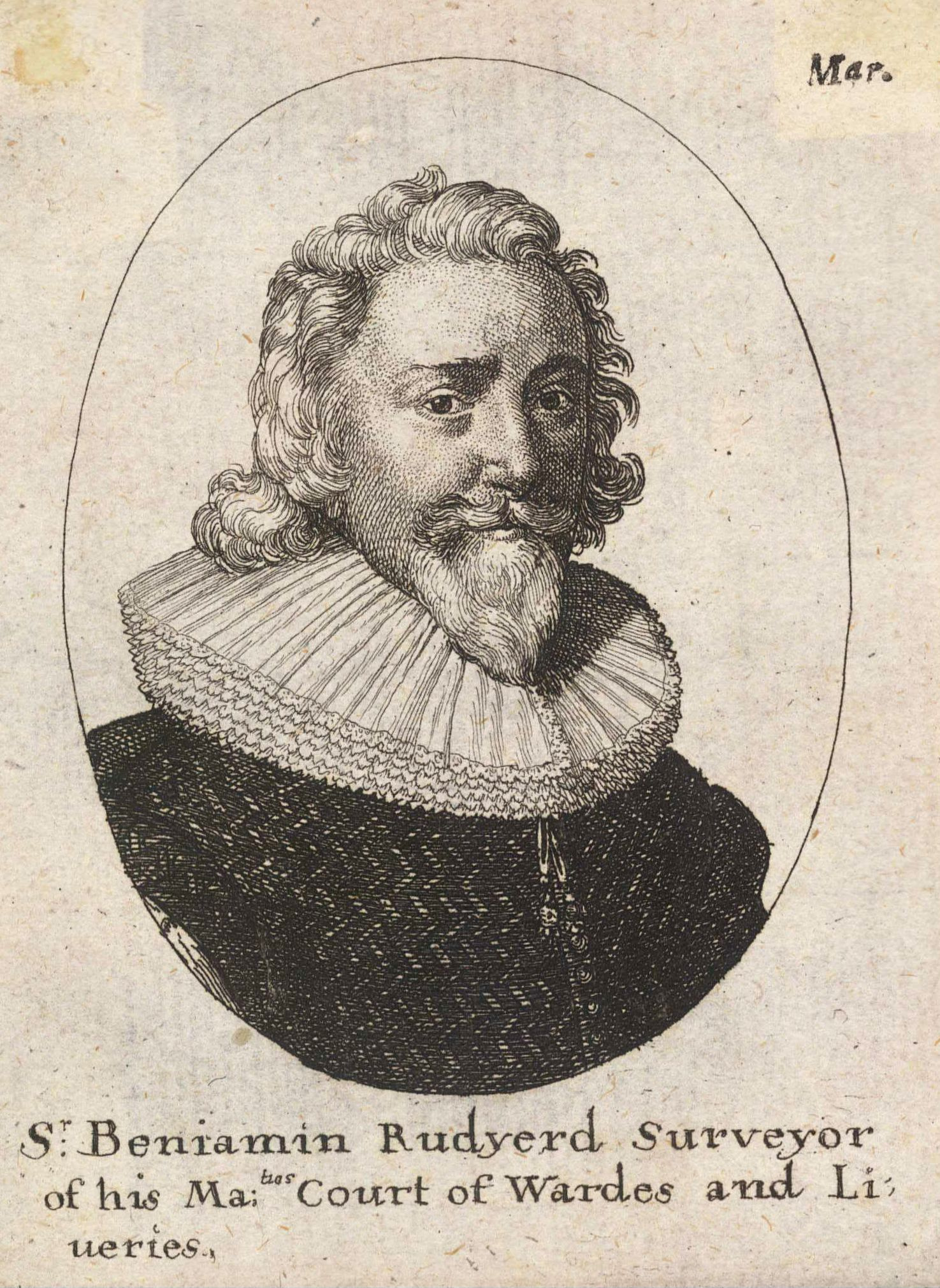
Benjamin Rudyerd, Portsmouth

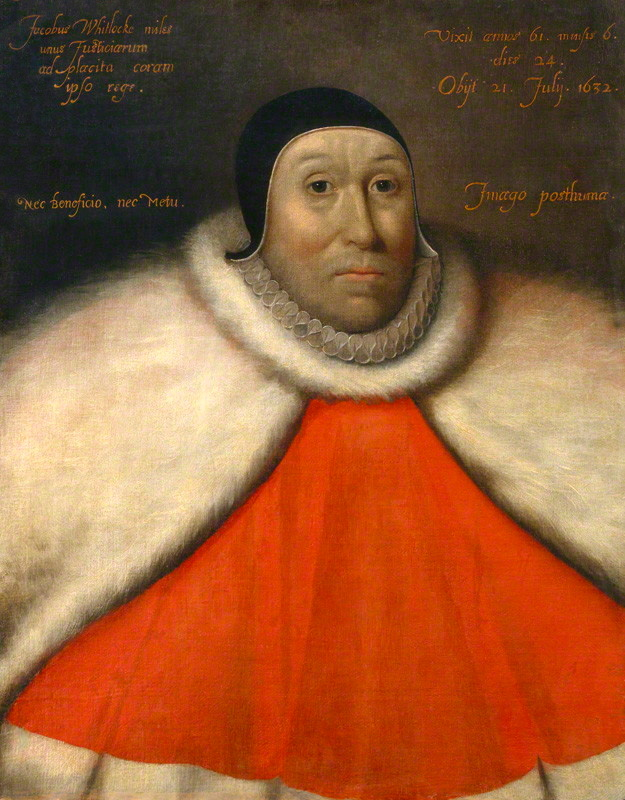
Sir James Whitelocke, Woodstock

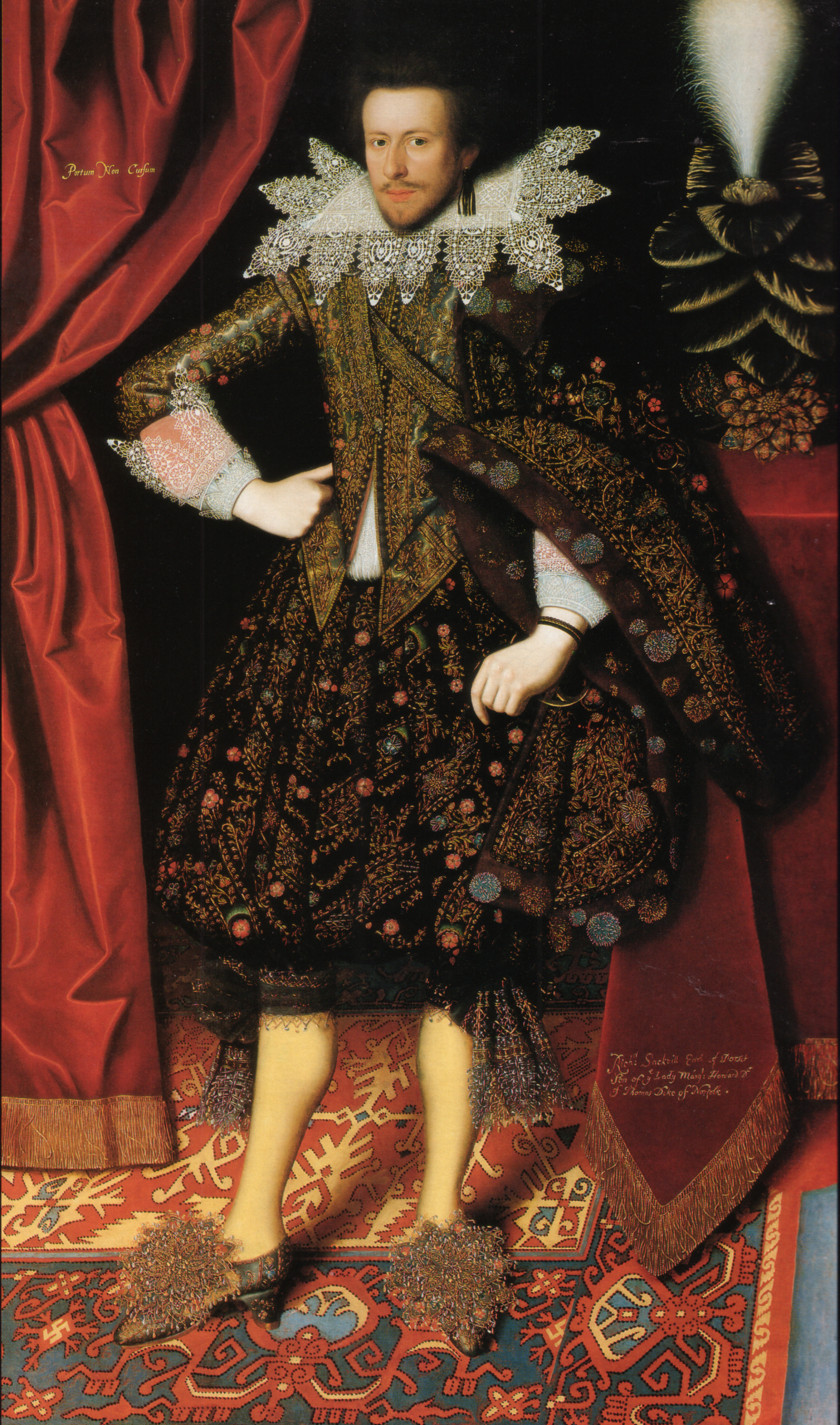
Edward Sackvile, Sussex

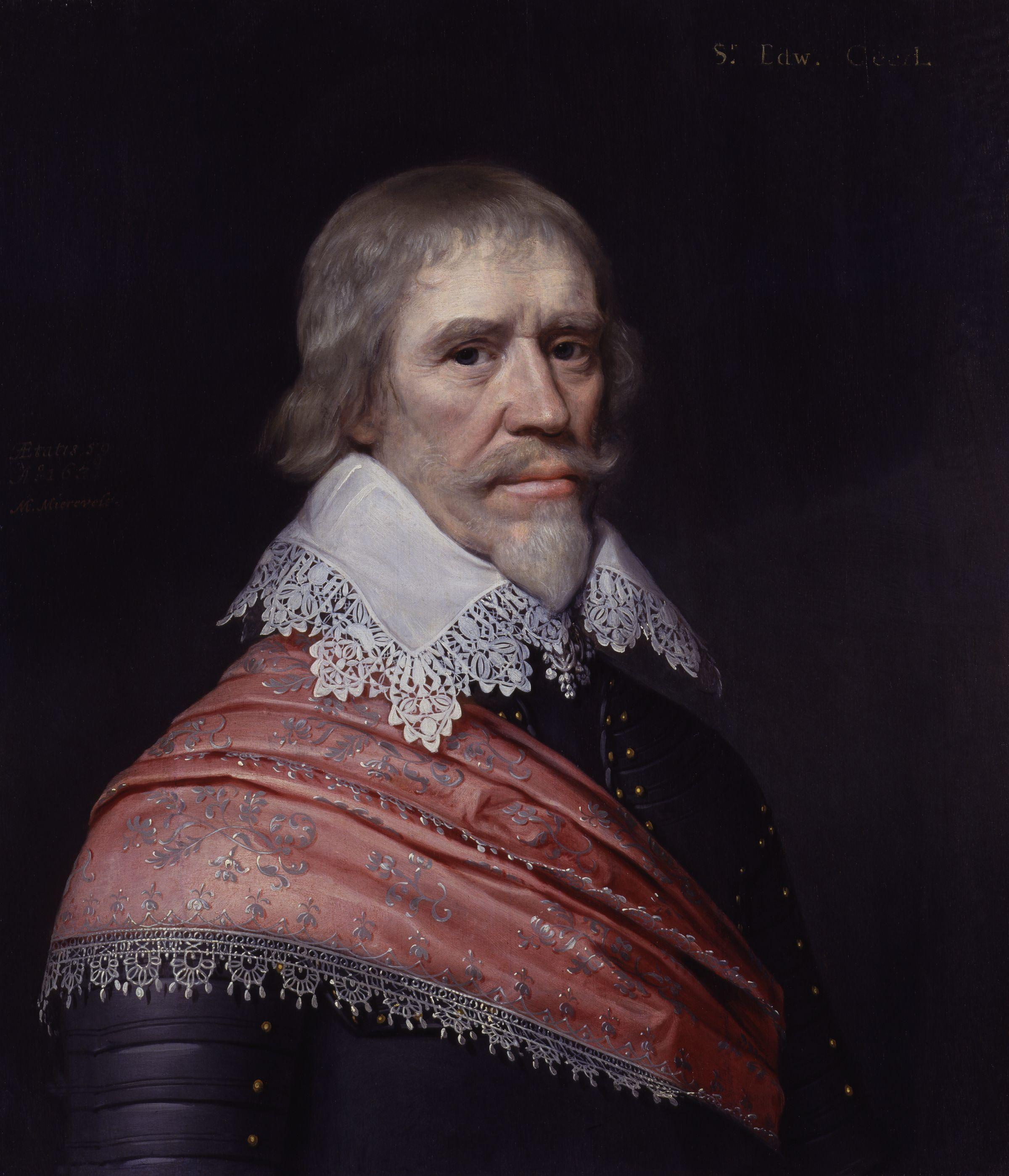
Edward Cecil, Chichester

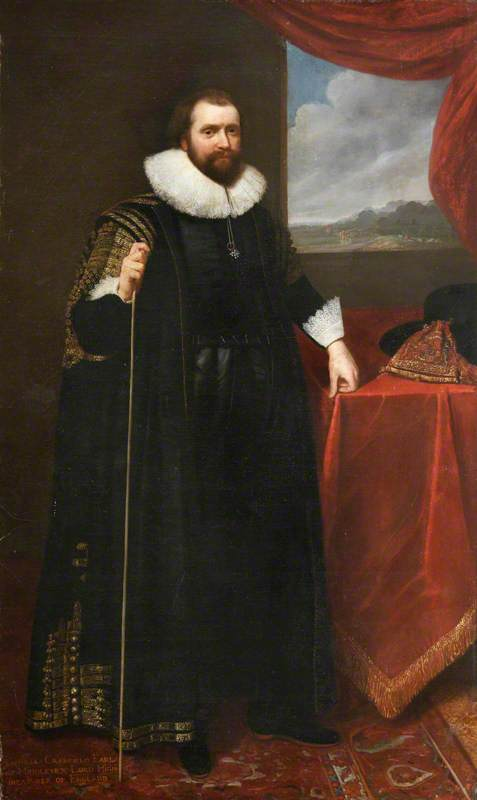
Sir Lionel Cranfield, Arundel

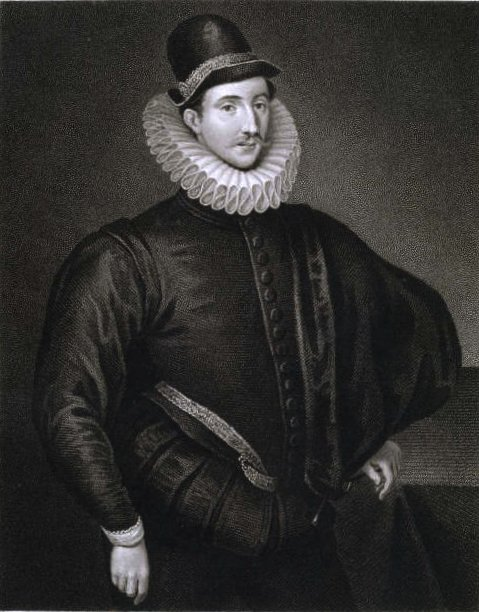
Fulke Greville, Warwickshire

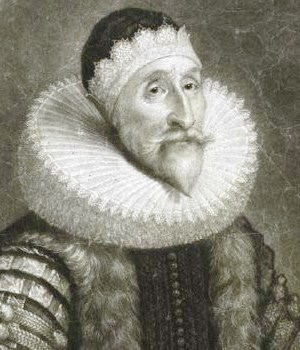
Sir John Coke, Warwick

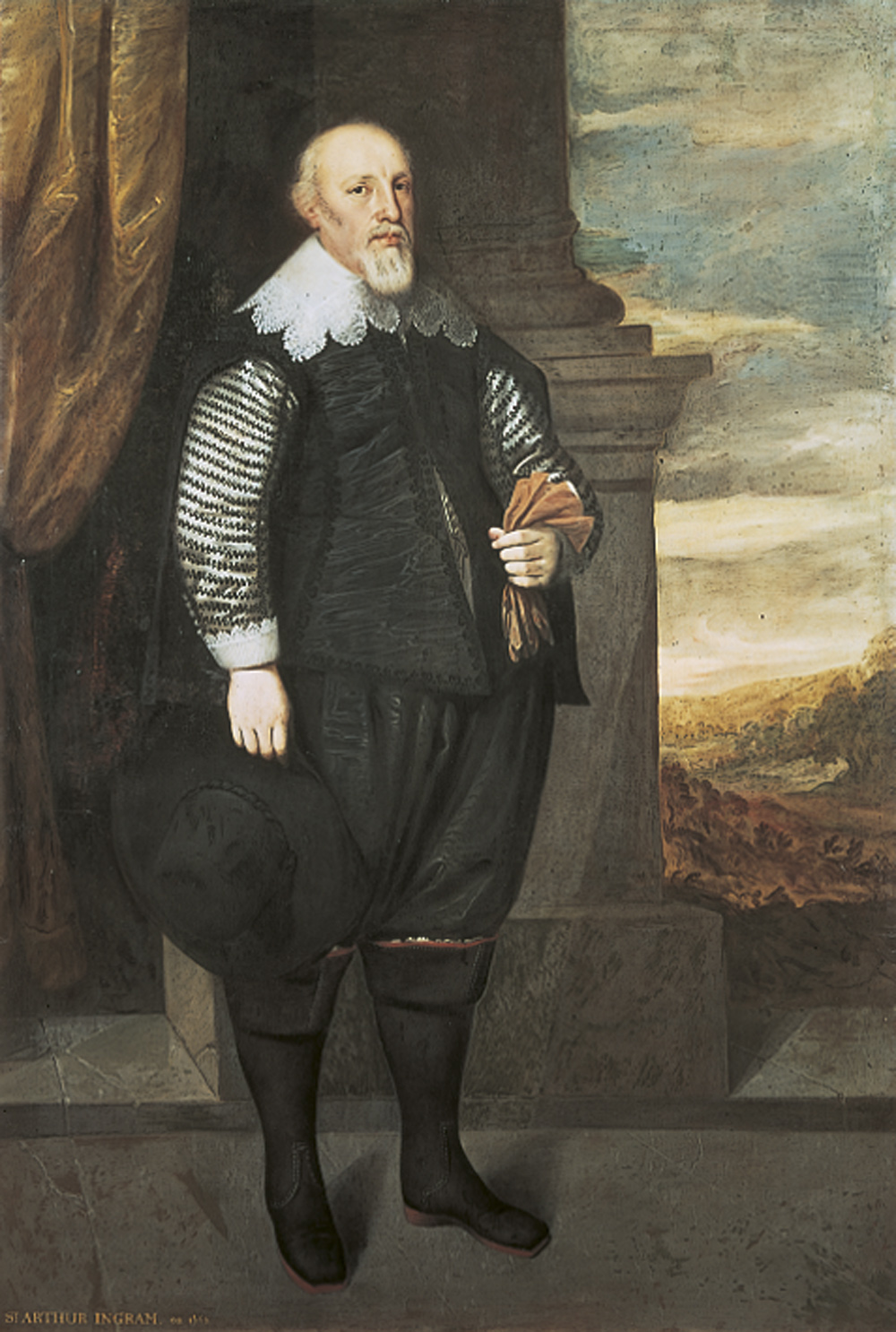
Sir Arthur Ingram, Appleby

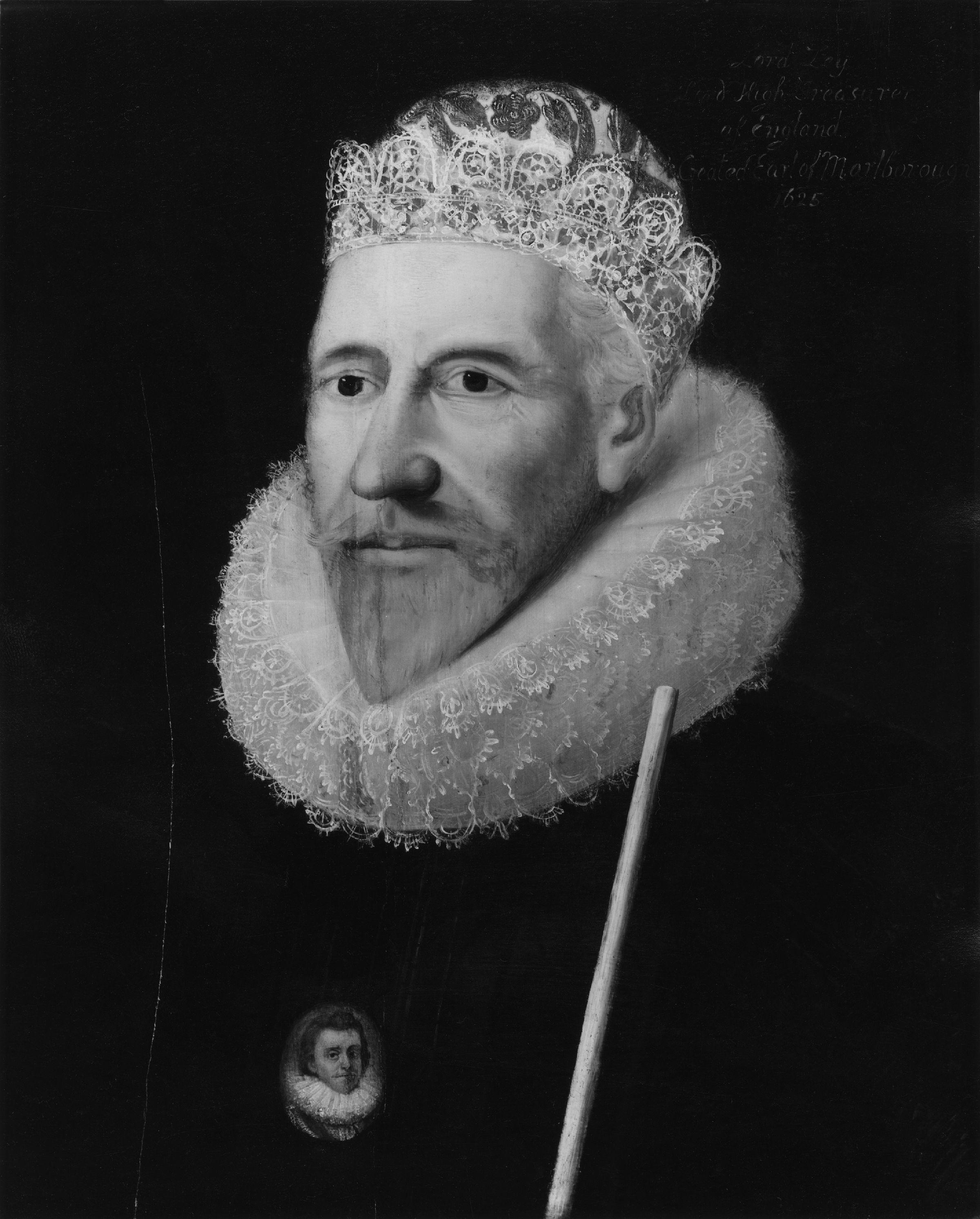
James Ley, Westbury

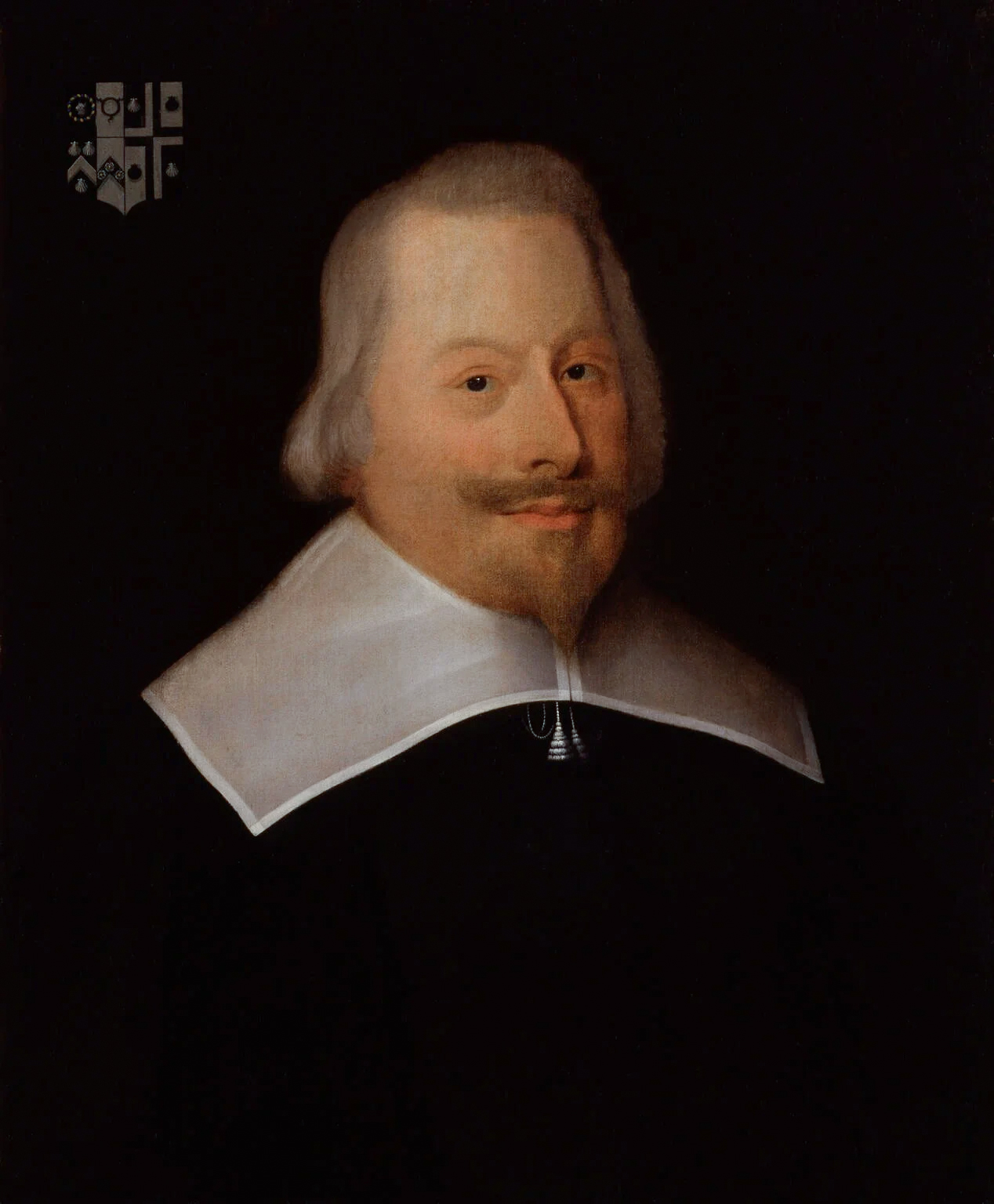
John Pym, Calne

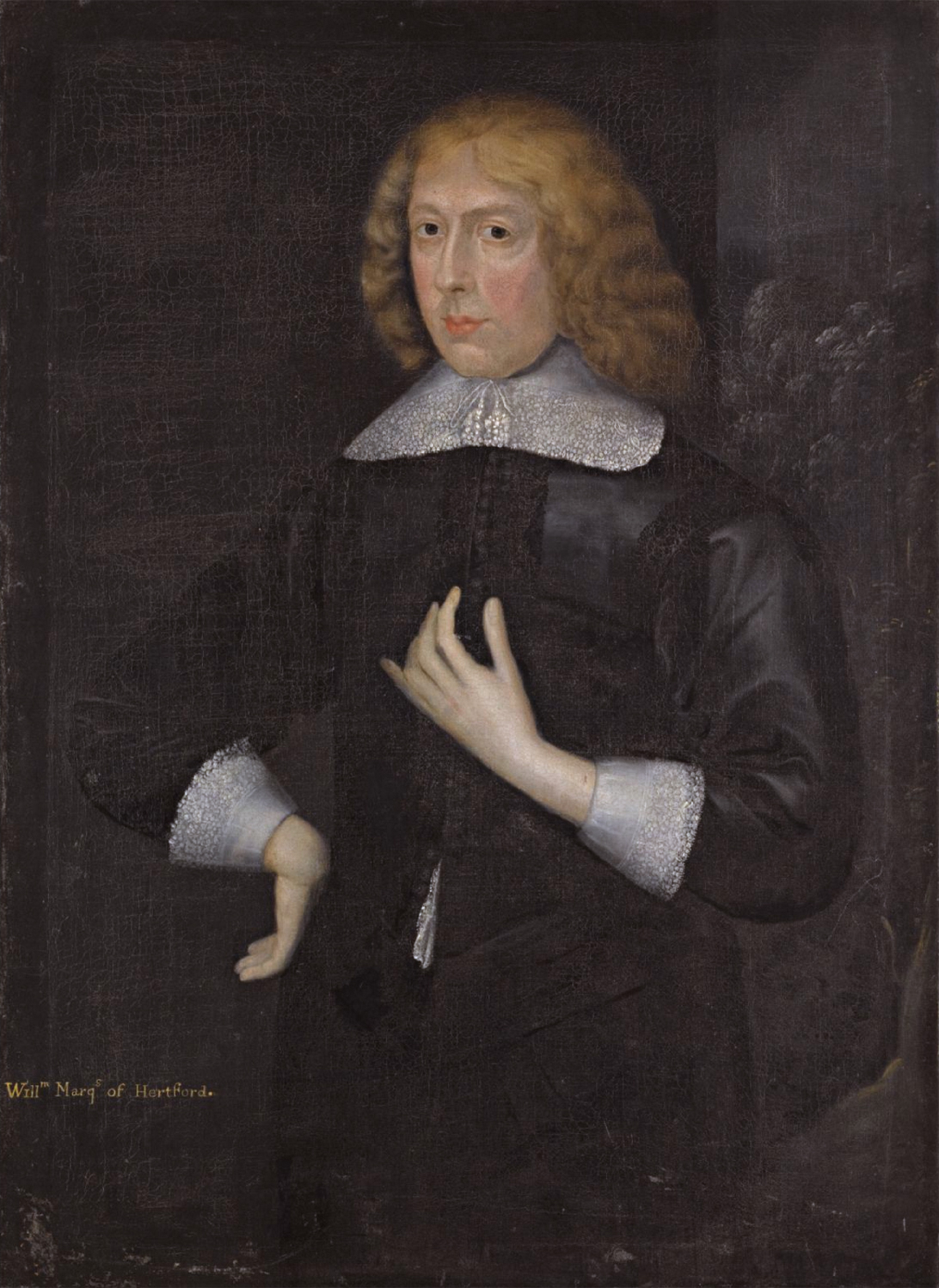
William Seymour, Marlborough

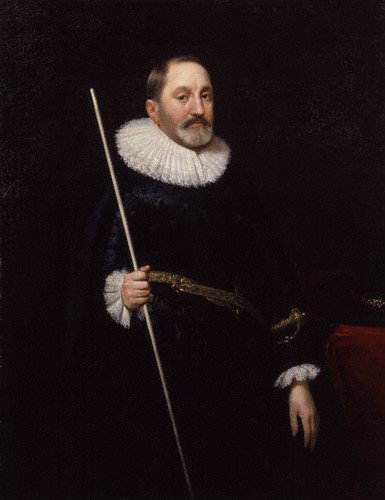
Sir Thomas Edmondes, Bewdley

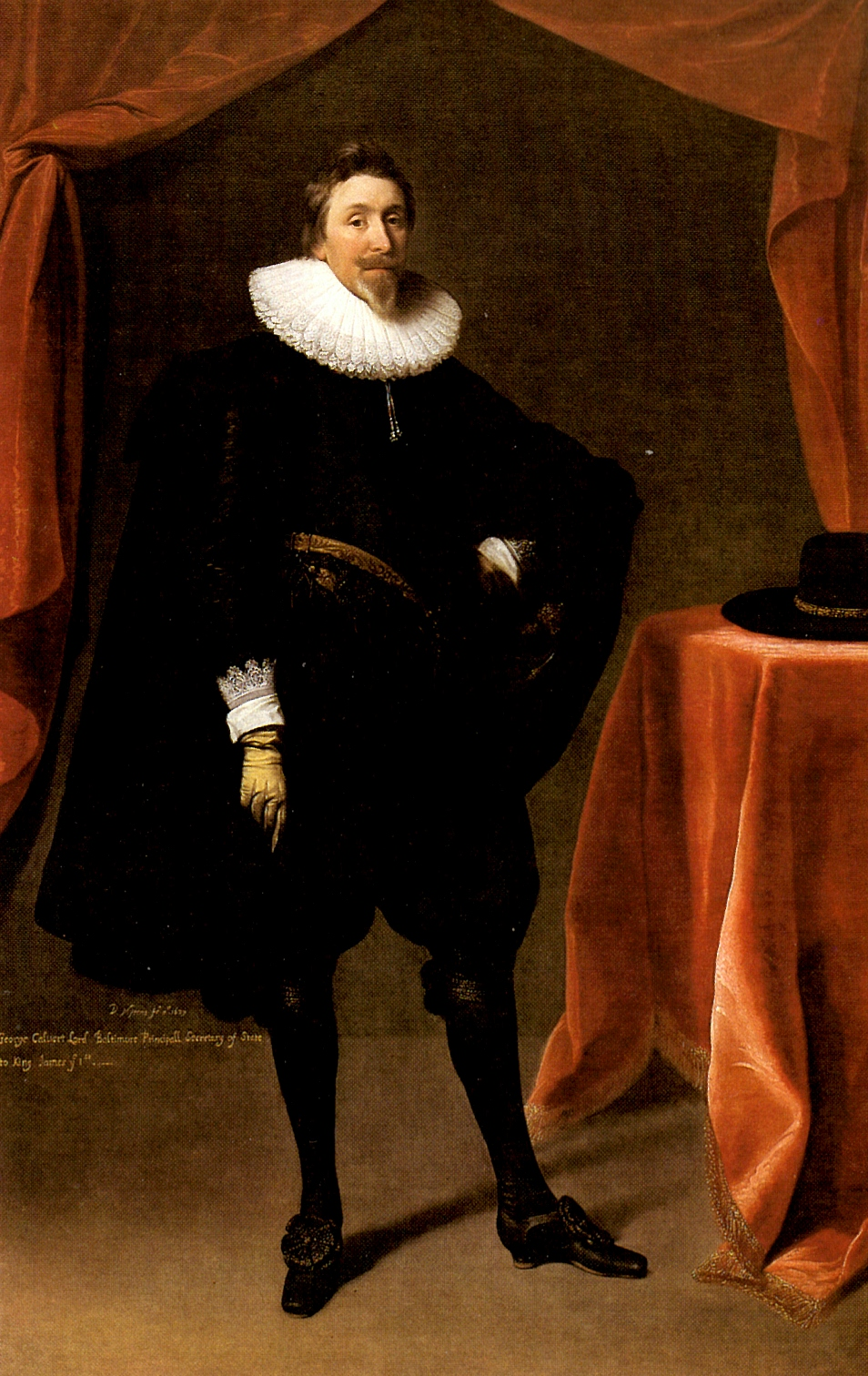
George Calvert, Yorkshire

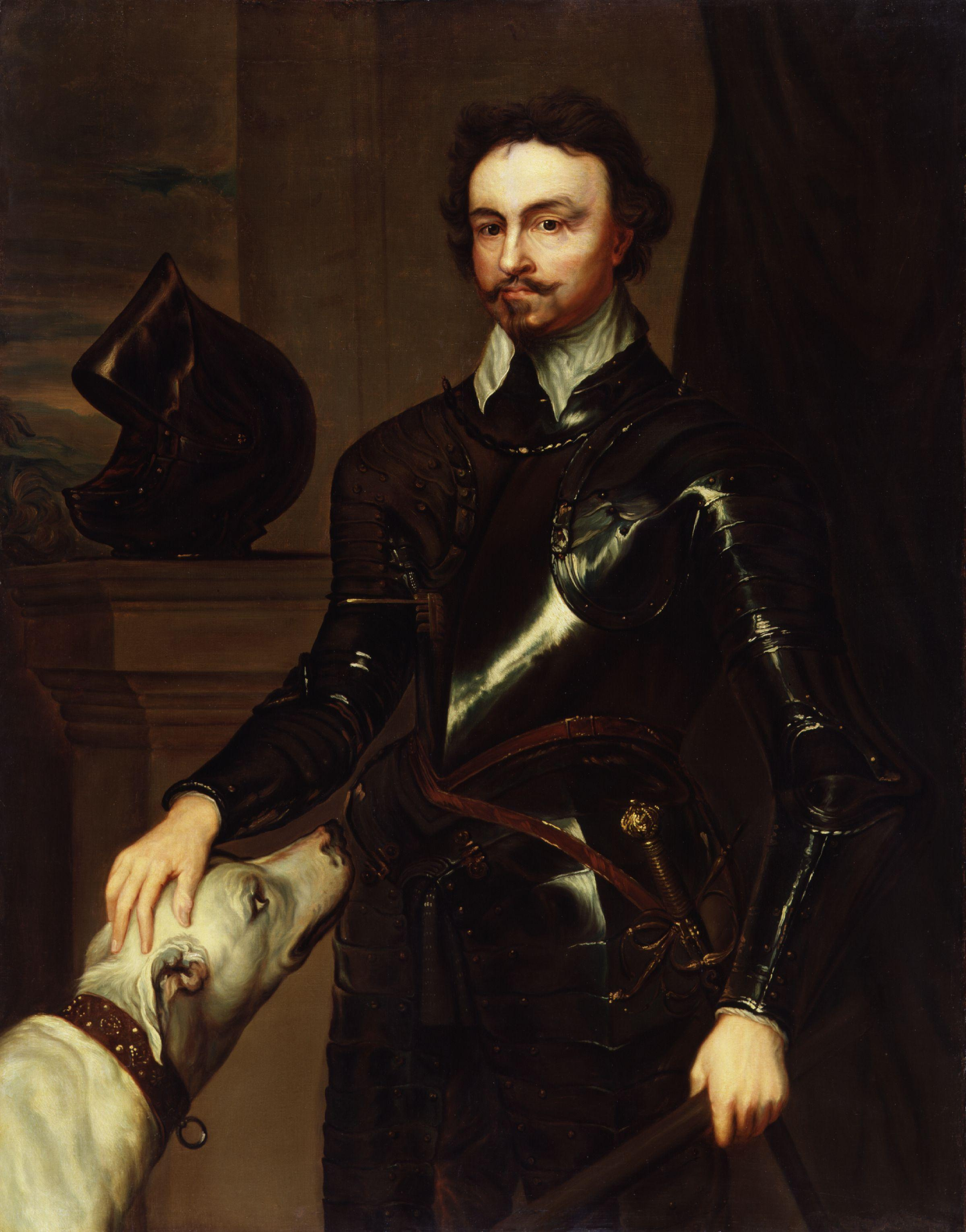
Sir Thomas Wentworth, Yorkshire

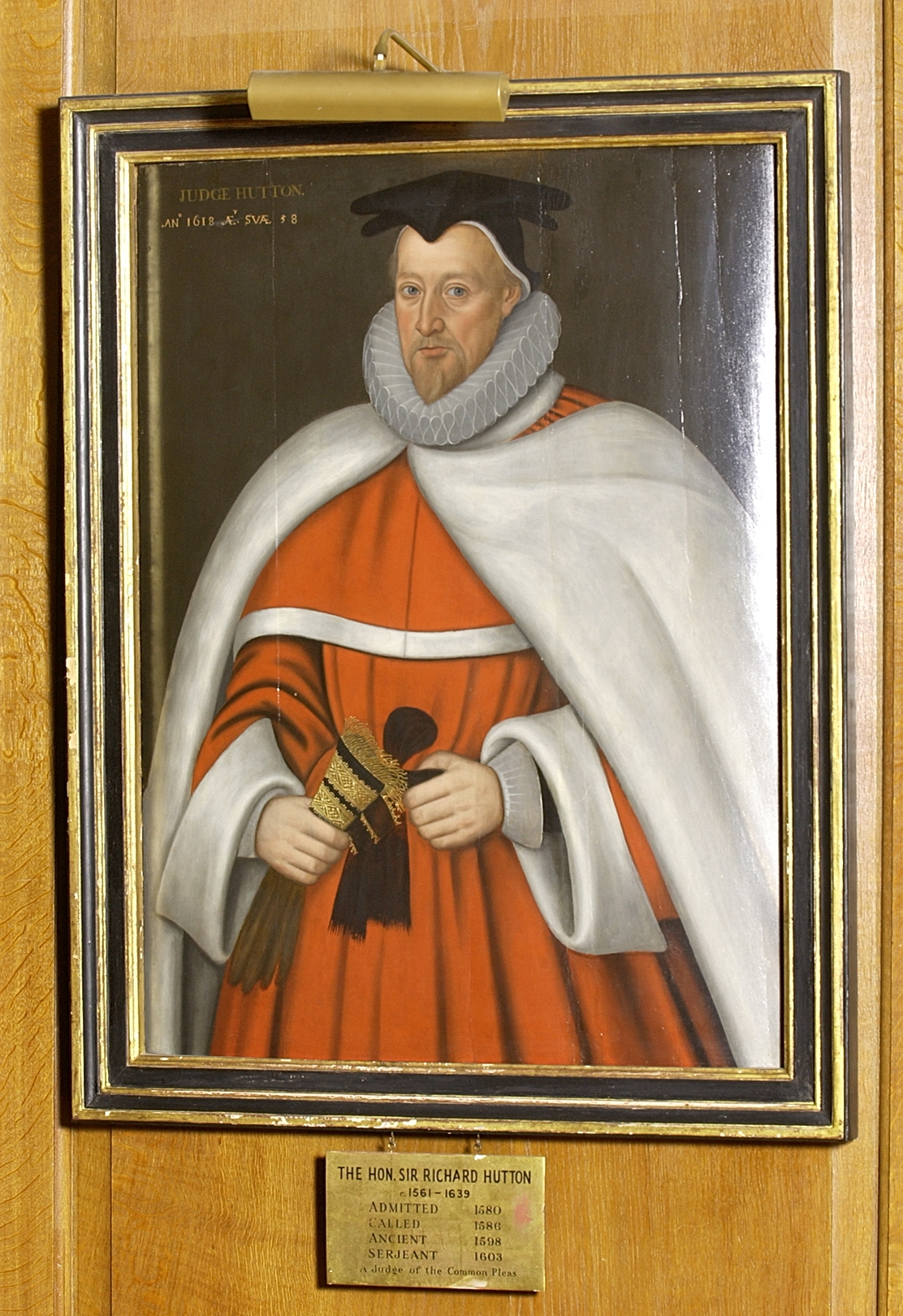
Sir Richard Hutton, Knaresborough

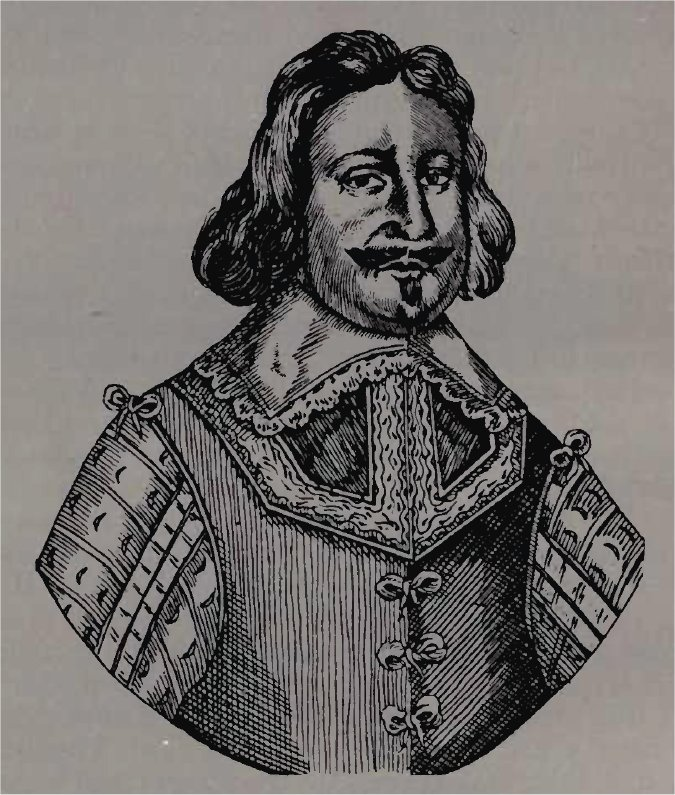
Ferdinando Fairfax, Boroughbridge

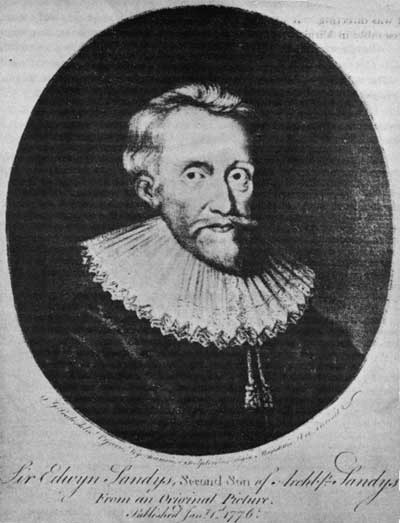
Sir Edwin Sandys, Sandwich

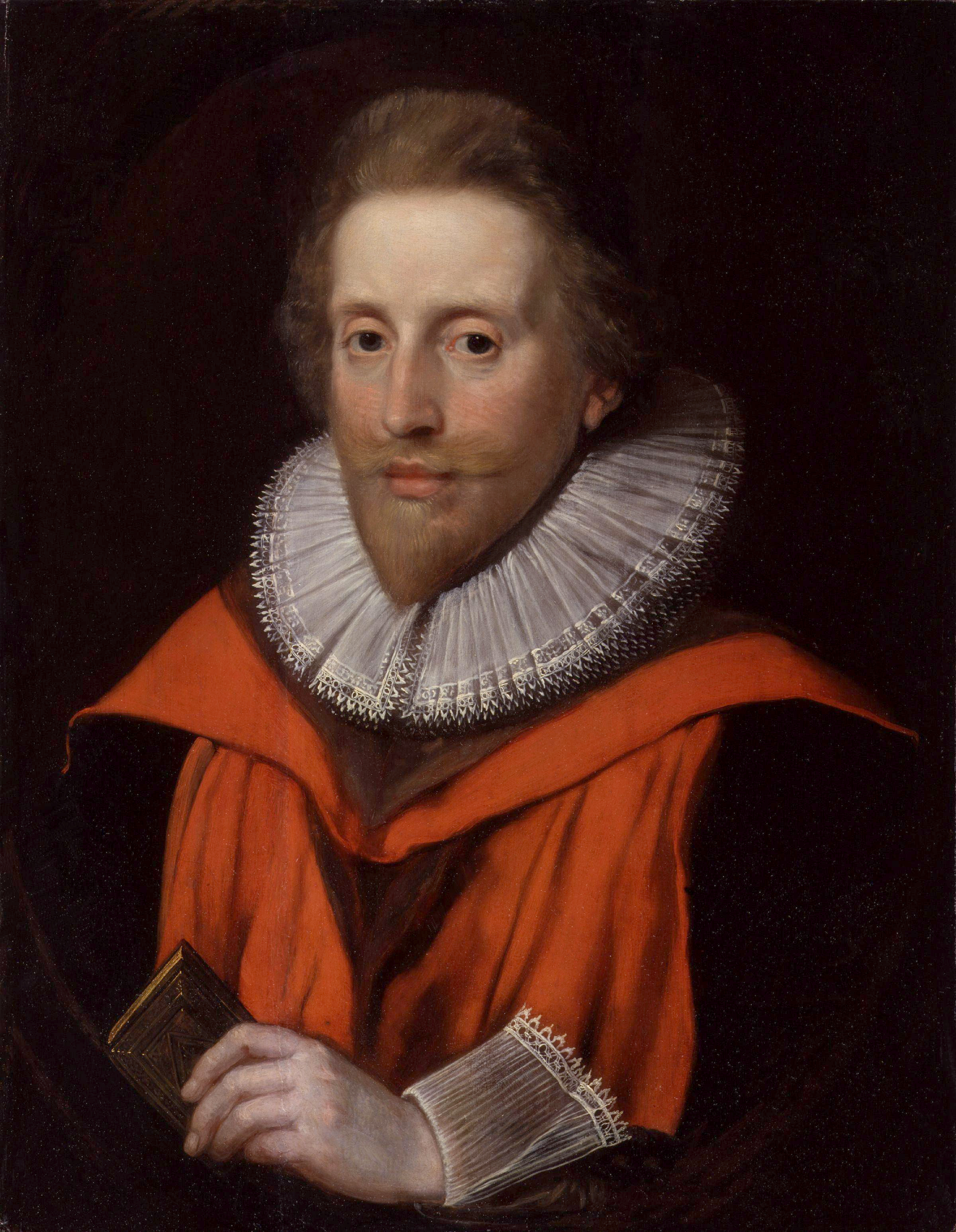
Richard Zouch, Hythe

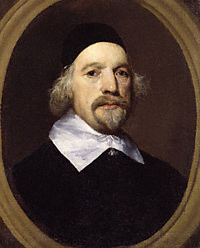
Sir Edward Nicholas, Winchelsea

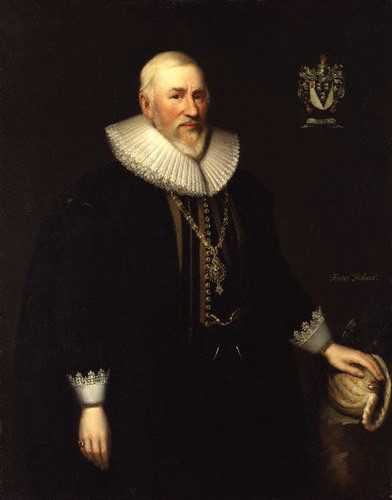
Sir Hugh Myddelton, Denbigh

In 1621 the constituencies of Pontefract and Ilchester were re-enfranchised after the Committee of Privileges investigated abuses where the right of boroughs to return burgesses had fallen into disuse.

=== Bedfordshire ===
Constituency	Members	Notes
Bedfordshire	Sir Beauchamp St John; Sir Oliver Luke	
Bedford	Sir Alexander St John; Richard Taylor	
=== Berkshire ===
Constituency	Members	Notes
Berkshire	Sir Richard Lovelace; Sir Robert Knollys	
Windsor	Sir Charles Howard; Sir Robert Bennet	
Reading	Anthony Barker; John Saunders	
Wallingford	Sir George Simeon; Samuel Dunch	
Abingdon	Robert Hyde	
=== Buckinghamshire ===
Constituency	Members	Notes
Buckinghamshire	Sir Francis Goodwin; Sir William Fleetwood	
Buckingham	Sir Thomas Denton; Richard Oliver	
Wycombe	Richard Lovelace; Arthur Goodwin	
Aylesbury	Sir John Dormer; Henry Borlase	
=== Cambridgeshire ===
Constituency	Members	Notes
Cambridgeshire	Sir Edward Peyton, 2nd Baronet; Sir John Cutts	
Cambridge University	Robert Naunton; Barnaby Gough	
Cambridge	Richard Foxton; Thomas Meautys	
=== Cheshire ===
Constituency	Members	Notes
Cheshire	Sir William Brereton; Sir Richard Grosvenor	
City of Chester	Edward Whitby; John Ratcliffe	
=== Cornwall ===
Constituency	Members	Notes
Cornwall	Bevil Grenville; John Arundell	
Launceston	John Harris; Thomas Bond	
Liskeard	Sir Edward Coke; Nicholas Hele	
Lostwithiel	Edward Salter; George Chudleigh	
Truro	Barnaby Gough; John Trefusis	Gough/Gooch sat for Cambridge replaced by Sir John Catcher; Browne Willis gives Samuel for John Trefusis
Bodmin	Sir John Trevor; James Bagg	
Helston	William Noy; Thomas Stafford	
Saltash	Sir Thomas Trevor; Sir Thomas Smith	
Westlow	Heneage Finch; Christopher Harris	
Grampound	John Hampden; Sir Robert Carey	
Eastlow	Sir John Walter; Jerome Horsey	
Camelford	Sir Henry Carey; Edward Carr	
Penryn	Robert Jermyn; Sir Francis Crane	
Tregoney	William Hakewill; Thomas Malet	
St Ives	John Lord Pawlet; Robert Bacon	
Mitchel	Richard Carew; John St Aubyn	
Bossiney	John Wood; Ambrose Manaton	
Fowey	Jonathan Rashleigh; John Treffry	
St Germans	Richard Tisdale; Sir Richard Buller	
St Mawes	Edward Wrightington; William Hockmere	Brown Wilis gives John for William Hockmere
Newport	Sir Edward Barrett; Sir Robert Killigrew	
Callington	Henry Rolle; James Lord Wriothesley	
=== Cumberland ===
Constituency	Members	Notes
Cumberland	Sir George Dalston; Sir Henry Curwen	
Carlisle	Sir Henry Vane; George Butler	
=== Derbyshire ===
Constituency	Members	Notes
Derbyshire	William Lord Cavendish; Sir Peter Fretchville	
Derby	Edward Leech; Timothy Leeving (Recorder)	
=== Devon ===
Constituency	Members	Notes
Devon	Sir Edward Seymour, 2nd Baronet; John Drake	
Exeter	John Prowse; Ignatius Jordan	
Totnes	Sir Edward Giles; Richard Rood (merchant)	
Barnstaple	John Delbridge; Pentecost Dodderidge	
Plymouth	John Glanville; Thomas Sherville (merchant)	
Plympton Erle	Sir William Strode; Sir Warwick Hele	
Tavistock	Francis Glanville; Sir Baptist Hicks	
Bere Alston	Thomas Wise; Thomas Keighley of London	
Clifton Dartmouth Hardness	William Nyell (merchant); Roger Matthew (Merchant)	
Tiverton	John Bampfield; John Davie	
=== Dorset ===
Constituency	Members	Notes
Dorset	Sir John Strangways; Sir Thomas Trenchard	
Dorchester	Sir Francis Ashley; John Parkins	Ashley resigned his place for Sir Thomas Edmondes and when Edmondes chose another seat he was re-elected for Dorchester
Poole	Sir Walter Erle; Sir George Hussey	
Shaftesbury	Thomas Sheppard; William Beecher	Both expelled – replaced by Percy Herbert and Ralph Hopton
Weymouth and Melcombe Regis	John Freke; Christopher Erle; Matthew Pitt; Giles Green	
Lyme Regis	John Poulett; Robert Hassard	
Wareham	Sir William Pitt; John Trenchard	
Bridport	John Strode; John Browne	
Corfe Castle	Sir Thomas Hatton, 1st Baronet; Sir Thomas Hammond	
=== Essex ===
Constituency	Members	Notes
Essex	Sir Francis Barrington Bt; Sir John Deane	
Colchester	William Towse; Edward Alford	
Maldon	Julius Caesar; Henry Mildmay	BW has the members for Maldon and Harwich transposed, which looks to be an error
Harwich	Sir Thomas Cheek; Edward Grimston	
=== Gloucestershire ===
Constituency	Members	Notes
Gloucestershire	Sir Robert Tracy; Sir Maurice Berkeley	
Gloucester	John Browne; Anthony Robinson	
Cirencester	Sir Thomas Roe; Thomas Nicholas	
Tewkesbury	Sir Dudley Diggs; Giles Brydges	
=== Hampshire ===
Constituency	Members	Notes
Hampshire	Sir Henry Wallop; Sir John Jephson	
Winchester	Richard Tichborne; William Savage	
Southampton	Sir Thomas Fleming; Henry Sherfield	
Portsmouth	Sir Daniel Norton; Sir Benjamin Rudyerd	
Petersfield	Richard Norton; Sir John Hippisley	
Newtown	John Ferrar; Sir Thomas Barrington, 2nd Baronet	Ferrar sat for Tamworth- replaced by Sir William Harington
Newport	Sir Richard Worsley, 1st Baronet; Sir William Uvedale	
Yarmouth	Arthur Bromfield; Thomas Risley	
Christchurch	Sir George Hastings; Nathaniel Tomkins	
Stockbridge	Sir Richard Gifford; Sir William Ayloffe, 1st Baronet	
Whitchurch	Thomas Jervoise; Sir Robert Oxenbridge	
Lymington	Sir William Doddington; Henry Compton	
Andover	John Shuter; Richard Venables	
=== Herefordshire ===
Constituency	Members	Notes
Herefordshire	Sir John Scudamore; Fitzwilliam Coningsby	
Hereford	James Rodd; Richard Weaver	
Leominster	Francis Smallman; William Beecher	
=== Hertfordshire ===
Constituency	Members	Notes
Hertfordshire	Sir Henry Cary; Sir Charles Morrison, 1st Baronet	
St Albans	Thomas Richardson; Robert Shute	Richardson was Speaker
Hertford	William Ashton; Thomas Fanshawe	
=== Huntingdonshire ===
Constituency	Members	Notes
Huntingdonshire	Richard Beavill; Sir Robert Payne	
Huntingdon	Sir Henry St John; Miles Sandys	
=== Kent ===
Constituency	Members	Notes
Kent	Robert Viscount Lisle; Sir George Fane	
Canterbury	John Finch; Sir Robert Newington	
Rochester	Sir Thomas Walsingham (younger); Henry Clerke	
Queenborough	James Palmer; William Frowde	
Maidstone	Sir Francis Fane; Sir Francis Barnham	
=== Lancashire ===
Constituency	Members	Notes
Lancashire	Sir John Ratcliffe; Sir Gilbert Hoghton, 2nd Baronet	
Lancaster	Sir Humphrey May; Sir Thomas Fanshawe	
Preston	Sir Edward Mosley; Sir William Pooley	
Clitheroe	Sir Thomas Walmsley; William Fanshawe	
Liverpool	Thomas May; William Johnson	
Wigan	Sir Thomas Gerard, 1st Baronet; Roger Downes	
Newton	Sir George Wright; Richard Kippax	
=== Leicestershire ===
Constituency	Members	Notes
Leicestershire	Sir George Hastings; Sir Henry Hastings	
Leicester	Sir Richard Moryson; Sir William Herrick	
=== Lincolnshire ===
Constituency	Members	Notes
Lincolnshire	Sir George Manners; Sir Thomas Grantham	
Lincoln	Sir Lewis Watson, 1st Baronet; Sir Edward Ayscough	
Boston	Sir Thomas Cheek; Anthony Irby	
Grimsby	Sir Christopher Wray; Henry Pelham	
Grantham	Sir William Airmine; Clement Cotterell	
Stamford	Richard Cecil; John Wingfield	
=== Middlesex ===
Constituency	Members	Notes
Middlesex	Sir Francis Darcy; Sir Gilbert Gerard, Bt	
Westminster	Sir Edward Villiers; Edmund Doubleday	Doubleday died 3 days after election - replaced by William Mann
City of London	Sir Thomas Lowe; Robert Heath; Robert Bateman; William Towerson	
=== Monmouthshire ===
Constituency	Members	Notes
Monmouthshire	Sir Edmund Morgan; Charles Williams	
Monmouth Boroughs	Thomas Ravenscroft	
=== Norfolk ===
Constituency	Members	Notes
Norfolk	Sir Hamon le Strange; Drue Drury	
Norwich	Sir Robert Rous; William Denny	
King's Lynn	Sir Matthew Clerke; John Wallis	
Yarmouth	Benjamin Cooper; Edward Owner	
Castle Rising	John Wilson; Robert Spiller	
Thetford	Sir Thomas Holland; Framlingham Gawdy	
=== Northamptonshire ===
Constituency	Members	Notes
Northamptonshire	Sir William Spencer; Sir Edward Montagu	Montagu became a peer - replaced by Richard Knightley
Peterborough	Mildmay Fane; Walter Fitzwilliam	
Northampton	Richard Spencer; Thomas Crew	
Brackley	Edward Spencer; Sir Thomas Wenman	
Higham Ferrers	Charles Montagu	
=== Northumberland ===
Constituency	Members	Notes
Northumberland	Sir William Grey; Sir Henry Widdrington	
Newcastle	Sir Henry Anderson; Sir Thomas Ridell	BW gives Sir Francis for Sir Henry Anderson
Morpeth	Robert Brandling; John Robson	Election of Robson, a Clergyman, invalidated - replaced by Ralph Fetherstonhaugh
Berwick upon Tweed	Sir John Selby; Sir Robert Jackson	
=== Nottinghamshire ===
Constituency	Members	Notes
Nottinghamshire	Sir Gervase Clifton; Sir George Chaworth	
Nottingham	Michael Purefoy; George Lassells	
East Retford	Sir Nathaniel Rich; Edward Wortley	
=== Oxfordshire ===
Constituency	Members	Notes
Oxfordshire	Sir Richard Wenman; Sir William Cope	
Oxford University	Sir John Bennet; Sir Clement Edmondes	
Oxford	Sir John Brooke; Thomas Wentworth	
Woodstock	Sir James Whitelocke; Philip Cary	
Banbury	Sir William Cope	
=== Rutland ===
Constituency	Members	Notes
Rutland	Sir Guy Palmes; William Bulstrode	BW corrigenda changes Palmer to Palmes
=== Salop ===
Constituency	Members	Notes
Shropshire	Sir Robert Vernon; Sir Francis Kynaston	
Shrewsbury	Sir Richard Newport; Francis Berkeley	
Bridgnorth	Sir John Hayward; William Whitmore	
Ludlow	Spencer Compton, Lord Compton; Richard Tomlins	
Wenlock	Sir Edward Lawley; Thomas Wolryche	
Bishops Castle	Francis Roberts; Gilbert Cornwall	
=== Somerset ===
Constituency	Members	Notes
Somerset	Charles Berkley; Robert Hopton	
Bristol	John Whitson; John Guy	
Bath	Sir Robert Phelips; Sir Robert Pye	
Wells	Sir Edward Rodney; Thomas Southwood	
Taunton	Thomas Brereton; Lewis Pope	
Bridgwater	Edward Popham; Roger Warre	
Minehead	Francis Pearce; Sir Robert Lloyd	
Ilchester	Richard Wynn	
=== Staffordshire ===
Constituency	Members	Notes
Staffordshire	Sir William Bowyer; Thomas Crompton	
Lichfield	William Wingfield; Richard Weston	
Stafford	Matthew Cradock; Sir Richard Dyott	
Newcastle under Lyme	John Davies; Edward Kyrton	
Tamworth	Sir Thomas Puckering Bt; John Ferrers	BW corrigenda changes Ferrers from Henry to John
=== Suffolk ===
Constituency	Members	Notes
Suffolk	Sir Robert Crane, 1st Baronet; Thomas Clinch	
Ipswich	Robert Snelling; William Cage	
Dunwich	Clement Coke; Thomas Bedingfield	
Aldeburgh	Sir Henry Glemham; Charles Glemham	
Orford	Sir Lionel Tollemache; Sir Roger Townshend	
Eye	Sir Roger North; Sir John Crompton	
Sudbury	Edward Osbourne; Brampton Gurdon	
Bury St Edmunds	Sir Thomas Jermyn; John Woodford	
=== Surrey ===
Constituency	Members	Notes
Surrey	Sir George More; Sir Nicholas Carew	
Southwark	Richard Yarward; Robert Bromfield	
Reigate	Thomas Glemham; Robert Lewis	
Bletchingly	John Hayward; Henry Lovell	
Gatton	Sir Thomas Gresham; Thomas Bludder	
Guildford	Sir Robert More; John Murray	
Haslemere	Sir Thomas Grimes; Sir William Browne	
=== Sussex ===
Constituency	Members	Notes
Sussex	Sir Edward Sackville; Christopher Neville	
Chichester	Sir Edward Cecil; Thomas Whatman	
Horsham	Thomas Cornwallis; John Middleton	
Midhurst	John Smith; Richard Lewknor	
Steyning	Thomas Shirley; Sir Edward Fraunceys	
Lewes	Sir George Goring; Richard Amhurst	
New Shoreham	Sir John Morley; Sir John Leedes	
Bramber	Thomas Bowyer; Robert Morley	
Arundel	Sir Lionel Cranfield; Sir Henry Spiller	Cranfield created a peer, Sep 1622 and replaced Nov 1622 by Sir Richard Weston
East Grinstead	Sir Henry Compton; Thomas Pelham	
=== Warwickshire ===
Constituency	Members	Notes
Warwickshire	Sir Fulke Greville; Sir Thomas Lucy	Greville ennobled - replaced by Sir Francis Leigh
Coventry	Sampson Hopkins; Henry Sewall	
Warwick	Sir Greville Verney; Sir John Coke	
=== Westmorland ===
Constituency	Members	Notes
Westmorland	Sir Henry Clifford; Sir Thomas Wharton	
Appleby	Sir Arthur Ingram; Thomas Hughes	
=== Wiltshire ===
Constituency	Members	Notes
Wiltshire	Sir Francis Seymour; Sir Edward Bayntun	
Salisbury	Roger Gauntlett; Thomas Hussey	
Wilton	Sir Thomas Tracy; Henry Nevill	Nevill ennobled in 1622 - replaced by Thomas Morgan
Downton	Sir Carew Raleigh; Thomas Hinton	
Devizes	Sir Henry Ley; John Kent	
Great Bedwyn	Sir Francis Popham; Sir Giles Mompesson	
Malmesbury	Sir Henry Poole; Sir Edward Wardour	
Ludgershall	Alexander Chocke; William Sotwell	
Chippenham	Edward Hungerford; John Baily	
Westbury	Sir James Ley; Sir Miles Fleetwood	
Cricklade	Thomas Howard; Sir Carew Reynell	
Hindon	Sir Edmund Ludlow; Sir John Davies	
Old Sarum	George Myne; Thomas Brett	
Calne	John Duckett; John Pym	
Heytesbury	Sir Thomas Thynne; Henry Ludlow	
Marlborough	William Seymour, Lord Beauchamp; Richard Digges	Seymour ennobled in 1621 and replaced by Sir Walter Devereux
Wootton Bassett	Richard Harrison; John Wrenham	
=== Worcestershire ===
Constituency	Members	Notes
Worcestershire	Sir Thomas Lyttelton, 1st Baronet; Sir Samuel Sandys	
Worcester	Sir Robert Berkley; John Coucher	
Droitwich	Sir Thomas Coventry; John Wilde	Coventry replaced by Ralph Clare
Evesham	Sir Thomas Biggs, 1st Baronet; Anthony Langston	
Bewdley	Sir Thomas Edmondes	
=== Yorkshire ===
Constituency	Members	Notes
Yorkshire	Sir George Calvert; Sir Thomas Wentworth	
York	Sir Robert Askwith (Alderman); Christopher Brooke	Brown Willis gives Christopher Broderick for Brooke
Kingston upon Hull	John Lister; Maurice Abbot	
Scarborough	Sir Richard Cholmeley; William Conyers	
Knaresborough	Sir Henry Slingsby; Sir Richard Hutton	
Richmond	Sir Talbot Bowes; William Bowes	
Beverley	Sir Christopher Hilliard; Edmund Scott	
Aldborough	Christopher Wandesford; John Carvile	
Thirsk	Thomas Belasyse; John Belasyse	
Hedon	Sir Matthew Boynton, 1st Baronet; Sir Thomas Fairfax of Walton	
Ripon	Sir Thomas Posthumous Hoby; William Mallory	
Pontefract	George Skillet; Edwin Sandys	
Boroughbridge	Sir Ferdinando Fairfax; George Withered	Listed in Browne Willis corrigenda
=== Cinque Ports ===
Constituency	Members	Notes
Hastings	Samuel Moore; James Lasher	
Dover	Sir Henry Mainwaring; Sir Richard Young	
Sandwich	Sir Edwin Sandys; Sir Robert Hatton	Hatton's election declared void - replaced by John Burroughes
Romney	Francis Fetherston; Sir Peter Manwood	
Hythe	Sir Peter Heyman; Richard Zouche	
Rye	Emanuel Gifford; John Angell	
Winchelsea	Sir Thomas Finch; Edward Nicholas	
=== Wales ===
Constituency	Members	Notes
Anglesey	Richard Williams	
Beaumaris	Sampson Eure	
Brecknockshire	Sir Henry Williams	
Brecknock	Walter Pye	
Cardiganshire	Richard Pryse	
Cardigan	Walter Overbury	
Carmarthenshire	Sir John Vaughan	
Carmarthen	Henry Vaughan	
Carnarvonshire	John Griffith	
Carnarvon	Nicholas Griffith	
Denbighshire	Sir John Trevor	
Denbigh Boroughs	Hugh Myddelton	
Flintshire	Sir Roger Mostyn	
Flint	William Ravenscroft	
Glamorgan	William Price	
Cardiff	William Herbert	
Merioneth	William Salisbury	
Montgomeryshire	Sir William Herbert	
Montgomery	Edward Herbert	
Pembrokeshire	John Wogan	
Pembroke	Lewis Powell	
Haverford West	Sir James Perrot	
Radnorshire	James Price	
Radnor	Charles Price	

== See also ==
- List of parliaments of England
