= James Kirton (died 1620) =

English politician

Sir James Kirton (died 1620) of Almsford Park, Somerset was an English estate administrator, landowner and politician who sat in the House of Commons at various times between 1593 and 1614.

== Biography ==
Kirton was the son of Edward Kirton (died 1601) of Almsford and his wife Lettice Gilbanke. After a period of study at the Temple, he entered the service of the Earl of Hertford in about 1582.

In 1593, he was elected Member of Parliament for Great Bedwyn, Wiltshire. He stated that from 1599 to 1608 he was employed in the matters of greatest trust on behalf of the Earl. In 1601 he was elected MP for Ludgershall, also in Wiltshire, and then re-elected in 1604. In 1605 he was employed as the steward of the Earl of Hertford when he was ambassador to Brussels for a short time. He was re-elected a third time for Ludgershall in 1614. In 1618 he was knighted and became J.P. for Somerset until 1619.

Kirton died in 1620 and was buried in St Botolph's, Aldgate. At his death he owned the house and grounds of Almsford Park, land in South Cary, the patronage of Castle Cary, and property there. He had also acquired property in Sopworth and Kingston Deverill, both in Wiltshire.

== Family ==
Kirton married Elizabeth Morley, daughter of John Morley, of Halfnaked, Sussex in about 1607. He was uncle to Edward Kirton (1585–1654), who was also MP for Ludgershall.

== Notes ==
Parliament of England
Preceded by John Seymour; Henry Ughtred	Member of Parliament for Great Bedwyn; 1593; With: Thomas Hungerford	Succeeded by Sir Anthony Hungerford; Francis Castilian
Preceded by Edmund Ludlow; Richard Leake	Member of Parliament for Ludgershall; 1601–1614; With: Robert Penruddocke; Henry Ludlow; Charles Danvers	Succeeded by Alexander Chocke; William Sotwell
