= 3rd Parliament of James I =

Parliament of England (summoned 1620, dissolved 1622)

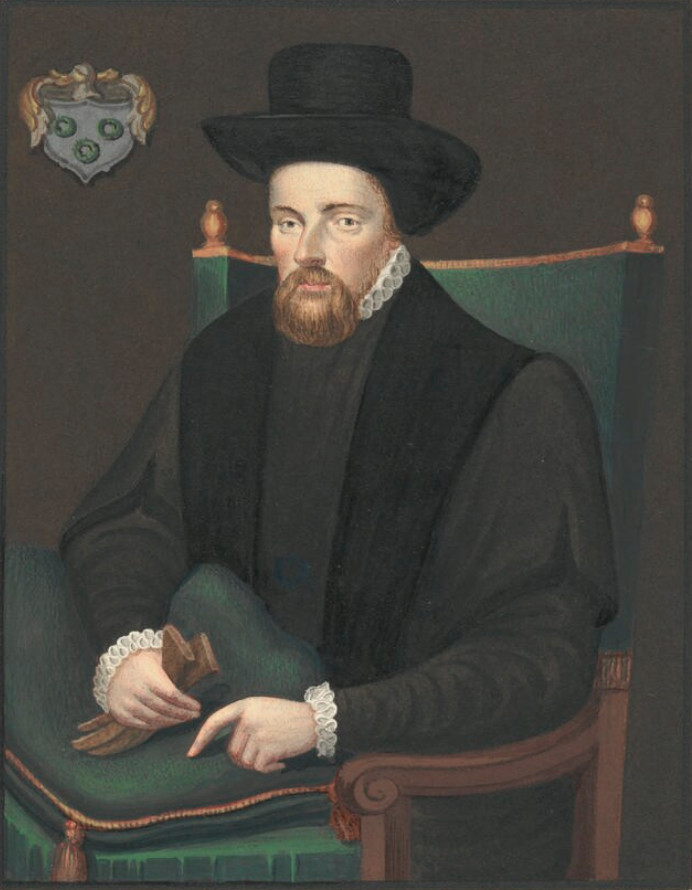
The Speaker, Sir Thomas Richardson

The 3rd Parliament of King James I was summoned by King James I of England on 13 November 1620 and first assembled on 30 January 1621. The elected speaker was Sir Thomas Richardson, the Member of Parliament for St Albans.

== Funds for the military support of Frederick V, Elector Palatine ==
After the disappointment of the 1614 Addled Parliament King James had attempted to rule without Parliament, but was obliged by events in continental Europe to summon a third parliament. His son-in-law Frederick V, Elector Palatine had accepted the throne of Bohemia and triggered an invasion by Spanish forces and James needed additional funds if he were to intervene on his son-in-law's behalf. To his relief Parliament voted him the additional subsidies and then moved on to investigate the abuse of monopolies and reform the Court of Chancery.

== Imprisonment of Francis Bacon and investigation against the Duke of Buckingham ==
During their investigations the Commons discovered that the Lord Chancellor, Sir Francis Bacon, the Viscount St Albans, had been taking bribes, resulting in him being dismissed from his office, fined and imprisoned. Other investigations into monopoly abuse revealed that a royal favourite George Villiers, 1st Duke of Buckingham and his associates were deeply involved, including Sir Giles Mompesson, who was stripped of his parliamentary seat and knighthood, and Buckingham's half-brother Sir Edward Villiers. King James reacted by threatening to dissolve the parliament in June 1621 but relented and allowed it to continue after the summer recess.

== Demand about the marriage of Prince Charles ==
When Parliament reassembled James demanded further subsidies and Parliament reluctantly acceded to his demand on condition that they should be allowed to finish their other business and also suggested that his son Prince Charles should seek a Protestant wife rather than the Spanish match James had in mind. James furiously asserted that royal marriages were nothing to do with Parliament, who in return drew up a protestation affirming their right to free speech, as a result of which James adjourned the sitting and ordered the arrest of the Protestation's principal author Sir Edward Coke. Further arrests followed and James downgraded the parliament to a convention (i.e. a parliament without royal approval) and finally dissolved it by proclamation on 6 January 1622.

== See also ==
- List of MPs elected to the English parliament in 1621
- List of acts of the 3rd Parliament of King James I
- List of parliaments of England
