= List of acts of the Parliament of England from 1620 =

This is a list of acts of the Parliament of England for the year 1620.

For acts passed during the period 1707–1800, see the list of acts of the Parliament of Great Britain. See also the list of acts of the Parliament of Scotland, and the list of acts of the Parliament of Ireland.

For acts passed from 1801 onwards, see the list of acts of the Parliament of the United Kingdom. For acts of the devolved parliaments and assemblies in the United Kingdom, see the list of acts of the Scottish Parliament, the list of acts of the Northern Ireland Assembly, and the list of acts and measures of Senedd Cymru; see also the list of acts of the Parliament of Northern Ireland.

For medieval statutes, etc. that are not considered to be acts of Parliament, see the list of English statutes.

See also the List of ordinances and acts of the Parliament of England, 1642–1660 for ordinances and acts passed by the Long Parliament and other bodies without royal assent, and which were not considered to be valid legislation following the Restoration in 1660.

The number shown after each act's title is its chapter number. Acts are cited using this number, preceded by the years of the reign during which the relevant parliamentary session was held; thus the Union with Ireland Act 1800 is cited as "39 & 40 Geo. 3. c. 67", meaning the 67th act passed during the session that started in the 39th year of the reign of George III and which finished in the 40th year of that reign. The modern convention is to use Arabic numerals in citations (thus "41 Geo. 3" rather than "41 Geo. III"). Acts of the last session of the Parliament of Great Britain and the first session of the Parliament of the United Kingdom are both cited as "41 Geo. 3".

Acts passed by the Parliament of England did not have a short title; however, some of these acts have subsequently been given a short title by acts of the Parliament of the United Kingdom, such as the Short Titles Act 1896 (59 & 60 Vict. c. 14).

Acts passed by the Parliament of England were deemed to have come into effect on the first day of the session in which they were passed. Because of this, the years given in the list below may in fact be the year before a particular act was passed.

== 18 & 19 Jas. 1 ==
The 3rd Parliament of King James I which met from 16 January 1621 until 19 December 1621.

This session was also traditionally cited as 18 & 19 Jac. 1, 18 & 19 Ja. 1 or 18 & 19 J. 1.

This session is not listed in the Chronological Table of the Statutes; the titles of the acts are printed in The Statutes of the Realm, Vol. IV, Part II; the Record Commissioners were unable to find any surviving copy of the text of either act.

No private acts were passed in this session.

=== Public acts ===
Short title	Citation	Royal assent
Long title
Taxation Act 1620	18 & 19 Jas. 1. c. 1	22 March 1621
An Act for the Grant of Two entire Subsidies, granted by the Temporalty.
Taxation (No. 2) Act 1620	18 & 19 Jas. 1. c. 2	22 March 1621
An Act for Confirmation of the Subsidies granted by the Clergy.

=== Sources ===
- Raithby, John, ed. (1963) [1819]. "18° & 19° Jac.". Statutes of the Realm. Vol. 4 Part 2: The Statutes of Queen Elizabeth (An. 28-43) and of King James (1586–1623). London: Dawsons. p. 1208 – via HathiTrust.
- Raithby, John, ed. (1963) [1819]. "18° & 19° Jac.". Statutes of the Realm. Vol. 4 Part 2: The Statutes of Queen Elizabeth (An. 28-43) and of King James (1586–1623). London: Dawsons. p. 1208 – via Google Books.
- Raithby, John, ed. (1963) [1819]. "18° & 19° Jac.". Statutes of the Realm. Vol. 4 Part 2: The Statutes of Queen Elizabeth (An. 28-43) and of King James (1586–1623). London: Dawsons. p. 1208 – via Internet Archive.
- Pickering, Danby, ed. (1763). "Anno decimo octave Jacobi". The Statutes at Large. Vol. 7: From the Thirty-ninth Year of Q. Elizabeth to the Twelfth Year of K. Charles. Inclusive. Cambridge: Joseph Bentham. p. 250 – via Internet Archive.
- Journal of the House of Commons. Vol. 1 – 1547-1629. His Majesty's Stationery Office. 1802 – via British History Online.
- Journal of the House of Lords. Vol. 3: 1620-1628. London: His Majesty's Stationery Office. 1830 – via British History Online.

== See also ==
- List of acts of the Parliament of England
