= Henry Ludlow (died 1639) =

English politician

Henry Ludlow (c. 1577 – 13 October 1639), of Tadley in the county of Hampshire, was an English politician who sat in the House of Commons between 1601 and 1611.

Ludlow was the son of Sir Edmund Ludlow and his first wife Bridget Coker, daughter of Henry Coker of Mappowder, Dorset. He was educated at Hart Hall, Oxford in 1591 and at Middle Temple in 1595.

In 1601, he was elected Member of Parliament for Andover. He was elected MP for Ludgershall in 1604. A piece of libellous verse "The Censure of the Parliament Fart" was composed in response to an audible emission by Ludlow in parliament in 1607.

Downe came grave auntient Sir John Crooke
And redd his message in his booke.
Fearie well, Quoth Sir William Morris, Soe:
But Henry Ludlowes Tayle cry’d Noe.
Up starts one fuller of devotion
Then Eloquence; and said a very ill motion
Not soe neither quoth Sir Henry Jenkin
The Motion was good; but for the stincking
Well quoth Sir Henry Poole it was a bold tricke
To Fart in the nose of the bodie politique

In 1624 Ludlow succeeded to the estates of his father.

Ludlow died at the age of about 63. He had married Lettice West, daughter of Thomas West, 2nd Baron De La Warr of Wherwell, Hanpshire and Offington, Sussex and had four sons and five daughters. His stepbrother also Henry was also an MP.

Parliament of England
Preceded by Edward Reynolds; Edward Phelips	Member of Parliament for Andover; 1601; With: Nicholas Hyde	Succeeded by Sir Thomas Jermyn; Thomas Antrobus
Preceded by Robert Penruddocke; James Kirton	Member of Parliament for Ludgershall; 1604–1611; With: James Kirton	Succeeded by James Kirton; Charles Danvers
