= Edmund Ludlow (died 1624) =

English politician

Sir Edmund Ludlow (before 1548 – 1624) was an English landowner and politician who sat in the House of Commons at various times between 1571 and 1622.

== Biography ==
Ludlow was born before 1548, the eldest son of George Ludlow of Hill Deverill, Wiltshire, and his wife Edith, daughter of Andrew Windsor, 1st Baron Windsor of Stanwell, Middlesex. In 1571, he was elected Member of Parliament for Old Sarum. He succeeded to the estates of his father in June 1580 and was a J.P. for Wiltshire from that time on. He was High Sheriff of Wiltshire from 1586 to 1587. In 1597, he was elected MP for Ludgershall. He was knighted on 14 September 1601. In 1604, he was elected MP for Hindon, and was re-elected in 1614. During his life he was involved in numerous lawsuits, and was conspicuously intractable with regard to matters of money and property. He lived at Maiden Bradley, Wiltshire in his later years.

Ludlow married firstly Bridget Coker, daughter of Henry Coker of Mappowder, Dorset, and had three sons, including Henry (also an MP), and seven daughters. Bridget died in 1587 and he married secondly Lady Margaret Howard, widow of Thomas Howard, 1st Viscount Howard of Bindon, and daughter of Sir Henry Manning, knight marshal of the Household. They had at least four sons and two daughters. His son by his second wife, Sir Henry Ludlow, was another MP, and Sir Henry's son, Edmund Ludlow, was one of the regicides.

Parliament of England
Preceded by Edward Herbert; Henry Compton	Member of Parliament for Old Sarum; 1571; With: John Young	Succeeded by Hugh Powell; John Frenche
Preceded by Edward Thornborough; Chidiock Wardour	Member of Parliament for Ludgershall; 1597; With: Richard Leake	Succeeded by Robert Penruddocke; James Kirton
Preceded by Sir George Paule; Thomas Thynne	Member of Parliament for Hindon; 1604–1614; With: Thomas Thynne 1604–1611; Sir Edwin Sandys 1614 (Sir) Henry Mervyn 1614	Succeeded by John Anketill; John Davies
