= Alexander Chocke of Shalbourne =

English politician

Alexander Chocke (1594–1625) of Shalbourne, Wiltshire and late of Hungerford Park, Berkshire, was an English politician who sat in the House of Commons from 1621 to 1622. (Note: Some sources give Alexander Chocke's date of birth as "1593/4".)

Chocke was of Somerset. He matriculated at Queen's College, Oxford on 19 May 1609 aged 15. In 1621, he was elected Member of Parliament for Ludgershall.

== Notes ==
Parliament of England
Preceded by Charles Danvers; James Kirton	Member of Parliament for Ludgershall; 1621; With: William Sotwell	Succeeded by Edward Kyrton; William Sotwell
