= Thomas Hinton (politician) =

English politician

Sir Thomas Hinton III (c. 1574 – 1 February 1635) was an English politician who sat in the House of Commons twice between 1621 and 1625.

Hinton was of Wiltshire. He matriculated at Queen's College, Oxford on 15 October 1591, aged 17. He was probably knighted on 1 July 1619. In 1621, he was elected Member of Parliament for Downton. He was elected MP for Ludgershall in 1625.

Parliament of England
Preceded by Thomas Morgan; Sir Robert Sidney	Member of Parliament for Downton; 1621–1622; With: Carew Raleigh	Succeeded by Sir Clipsby Crew; Sir William Dodington
Preceded by Edward Kyrton; William Sotwell	Member of Parliament for Ludgershall; 1625; With: Robert Pye	Succeeded by Sir William Walter; Sir Thomas Jaye
