= Edmund Ludlow =

English parliamentarian (c.1617–1692)

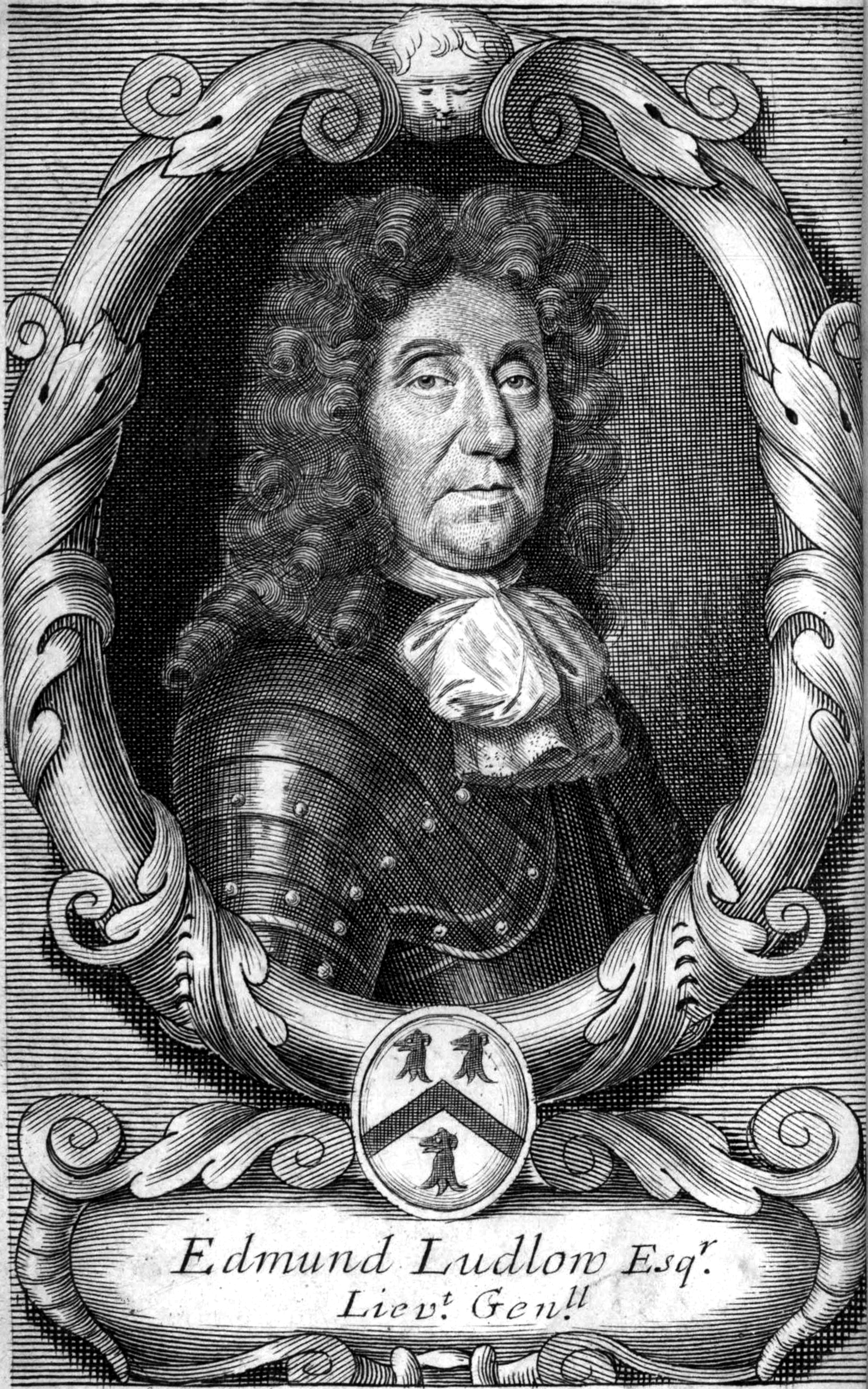

Commander-in-chief of Ireland
- In office 18 July 1659 – 5 January 1660
- Preceded by: Henry Cromwell (as lord deputy)
- Succeeded by: The Duke of Albemarle (as lord lieutenant)

Member of parliament for Hindon
- In office 1659 – (rump parliament abolished)

Member of parliament for Wiltshire
- In office 1646–1653

Personal details
- Born: c. 1617 Maiden Bradley, Wiltshire, England
- Died: 1692 Vevey, Switzerland
- Party: Commonwealthsmen
- Spouse: Elizabeth Thomas
- Profession: politician, soldier

Military service
- Rank: Lieutenant-general of horse (1650-1655...1659-1660); Commander-in chief of the New Model Army in Ireland (1651-1652); Commander-in-chief of all forces in Ireland (1659-1660)
- Battles/wars: Wars of the Three Kingdoms. First English Civil War. Second English Civil War. Irish Confederate Wars

Edmund Ludlow (c. 1617–1692) was an English parliamentarian, best known for his involvement in the execution of Charles I, and for his Memoirs, which were published posthumously in a rewritten form and which have become a major source for historians of the Wars of the Three Kingdoms. Ludlow was elected a Member of the Long Parliament and served in the Parliamentary armies during the English Civil Wars. After the establishment of the Commonwealth in 1649 he was made second-in-command of Parliament's forces in Ireland, before breaking with Oliver Cromwell over the establishment of the Protectorate. After the Restoration Ludlow went into exile in Switzerland, where he spent much of the rest of his life. Ludlow himself spelt his name Ludlowe.

== Early life ==
Ludlow was born in Maiden Bradley, Wiltshire, the son of Sir Henry Ludlow of Maiden Bradley and his wife, Elizabeth, daughter of Richard Phelips of Montacute, Somerset. He matriculated at Trinity College, Oxford in September 1634 and graduated in 1636. He was admitted to the Inner Temple in 1638.

== English Civil Wars ==
At the start of the Civil War in 1642, Ludlow engaged as a volunteer in the lifeguard of Lord Essex. His first battle was at Worcester on 23 September 1642, and his next was at Edgehill on 23 October 1642. In 1643 he returned to Wiltshire and became captain of a troop of horse for Sir Edward Hungerford's regiment. Hungerford made him governor of Wardour Castle in 1643, but he had to surrender to the Royalists after a tenacious three-month defence on 18 March 1644.

After a brief imprisonment in Oxford, he was exchanged soon afterwards, and engaged as major of Arthur Hesilrige's regiment of horse. He was present at the second battle of Newbury in October 1644, at the siege of Basing House in November, and took part in an expedition to relieve Taunton in December. In January 1645 Sir Marmaduke Langdale surprised his regiment, with Ludlow only escaping with difficulty.

After serving as High Sheriff of Wiltshire for 1645 he was elected in 1646 Member of Parliament (MP) for Wiltshire in place of his father, and became involved with the Independent faction within Parliament – especially with Henry Marten and other radical critics of the monarchy. Ludlow was a Baptist and Calvinist predestinarian, and his political views were inextricably interlinked with providentialist and apocalyptic religious views.

Ludlow opposed negotiations with Charles I, and was one of the chief promoters of Pride's Purge in 1648. He was one of the king's judges, and signed the warrant for his execution. In February 1649 he was elected a member of the new Council of State after having himself been involved in drawing up the terms for its existence. Around this time he married Elizabeth Thomas of Glamorgan.

== Campaign in Ireland ==
After Oliver Cromwell returned from Ireland in June 1650, he appointed Ludlow as lieutenant-general of horse and second-in-command to Henry Ireton in Parliament's campaign there. Here he spared neither health nor money in the public service. He landed in Ireland in January 1651 and was involved in the Siege of Limerick (1650–51). After Ireton's death on 26 November 1651, Ludlow held the chief command, and had practically completed the conquest of the island when he resigned his authority to Fleetwood in October 1652. Most of his campaigning in Ireland was against Irish guerrillas or "tories" and much of his operations consisted of hunting small bands and destroying foodstuff and crops. Ludlow is remembered for what he said of the Burren in County Clare during counter-guerilla operations there in 1651–52; "It is a country where there is not enough water to drown a man, wood enough to hang one, nor earth enough to bury him."

== The Protectorate ==
Though disapproving of Cromwell's action in dissolving the Rump Parliament in April 1653, Ludlow maintained his employment. However, when Cromwell was declared Lord Protector after the failure of Barebone's Parliament he declined to acknowledge his authority.

According to his Memoirs he believed that Cromwell "had not appeared that he ever approved on any persons farther than he might make them subservient to his own ambitious designs; ...and that the generality of the people that had engaged with us having acted upon no higher principles than those of civil liberty, and that they might be governed by their own consent, it could not be just to treat them in another manner upon any pretenses whatsoever."

On returning to England in October 1655 he was arrested, and on refusing to submit to the government was allowed to retire to Essex. When examined by Cromwell, he was asked: "Pray then,' said he, 'what is it that you would have? May not every man be as good as he will? What can you desire more than you have?' 'It were easy,' said I, 'to tell what we would have.' 'What is that, I pray?' said he. 'That which we fought for,' said I, 'that the nation might be governed by its own consent."

After Oliver Cromwell's death, Ludlow was returned for Hindon, Wiltshire, in Richard's Parliament of 1659, but opposed the continuance of the Protectorate. He sat in the restored Rump Parliament, and was a member of its Council of State and of the Committee of Safety after its second expulsion, and a commissioner for the nomination of officers in the army.

== Opposition to the Restoration ==
The Wallingford House party, a strong faction in the army, "who had thus possessed themselves of the supreme power, were every day pressed from all parts, and especially from the city of London, to restore the Long Parliament, as the only means to satisfy the people, and to establish an equal and just government amongst us in the way of a Commonwealth...they were compelled at last to admit the debate of the restitution of the Long Parliament amongst other propositions that were under their consideration. They also restored some officers to their commands who had suffered for their affection to the Parliament..." Edmund Ludlow, was still loyal to Henry Vane the Younger and other Long Parliament leaders.

In July 1659, Edmond Ludlow was appointed commander-in-chief by the restored Rump Parliament of all forces in Ireland; and made Lieutenant-General of the Horse. Upon Ludlow's departure from parliament, he pleaded with Sir Arthur Haslerig, Henry Vane the Younger, Mr. Henry Nevil, Mr. Scot, and Major Saloway not to put any unnecessary hardships upon those in the army.

In August 1659, King's party addressed themselves to Col. Lambert through his wife, endeavouring to persuade her to solicit her husband to be the instrument of the King's return, with large land offers of whatsoever terms he would demand. "She acquainted the colonel with their propositions; but he having resolved to play another part, discovered the whole intrigue to Henry Vane the Younger, who having communicated it to Sir. Arthur Haslerig, and knowing there had been some differences between the colonel and Sir. Arthur, he persuaded them to renew their former friendship, with promises on each part to unit their endeavours in the service of Parliament". Ludlow and Lambert were more or less aligned and of the same party. Similar offers were apparently made to Col. Monk by the King's party at about this time.

Returning to England again in October 1659, he endeavoured to support the original republican cause by reconciling the army to the parliament. Ludlow failed in these final reconciliation attempts primarily because of the divisions and corruption within the military, legal, and Presbyterian factions. Each faction feared successful attempt in bringing forth an equally representative republic on anything other than their own terms. For example, it was difficult for the key leaders of a previously suspended Long Parliament to take seriously any overtures from an army which had disbanded them without significant concessions to the army's power and good behaviour, terms to which the Wallingford House and Gen. Lambert's party would not agree. Although Ludlow had the support of Henry Vane the Younger and some other generals, these efforts proved abortive since each side had much to lose in any compromise. While these futile attempts at reconciliation between the Wallingford House party and key members of the Long Parliament were taking place, other matters would soon override all these various factions and encompass all these parties in serious compromise and peril. Consequently, most of the generals of the Wallingford House party and the key members of the Long Parliament who were in favour of the Good Old Cause (of a republican commonwealth) would lose their lives upon the restoration of King Charles II. It was believed by many of this republican faction that George Monck was for the restoration of the Long Parliament. They had no idea that King Charles II would be restored by George Monck to the throne and were entirely deceived by Monck's treachery to the republican cause. The attempts at reconciliation between the Wallingford House part of the army and Parliament failed.

Despite Ludlow's efforts of bringing these parties together, he was accused by some members of the Parliament of treason for having conspired with the Wallingford House party, who to these same members of Parliament seemed to be against the restoration of the original republic and only for their own continuance. Many of the generals and officers of the Wallingford House party also considered Ludlow as disloyal to their own cause and rights given his devotion to the "Old Commonwealth way". In the confusion, the Parliament recalled his commission and in December as Ludlow returned hastily to Ireland to suppress a movement in favour of the adverse party in the Long Parliament he found generals of the corresponding and opposing factions in command of all strategic points and himself almost without supporters. He came back to England in January 1660, and was met with an impeachment presented against him by parliament. His own republican faction allies had also been largely forced out of power and could not assist him.

His influence and authority had now disappeared, and all chance of regaining them vanished with General John Lambert's failure to stop General George Monck's army from reaching London in support of the English Restoration. Monck led each party faction (republican, military, and restoration) to believe that he had declared for Parliament but kept his plans to himself until he had accomplished his purpose on what exactly that meant to him.

== Exile after the Restoration ==
Ludlow took his seat in the Convention Parliament as member for Hindon, Wiltshire, but his election was annulled on 18 May after the parliament ruled that all those that had been judges of Charles I during his trial should be arrested. Ludlow was not protected under the Pardon, Indemnity and Oblivion Act. Accordingly, on the proclamation of the king ordering the regicides to come in, Ludlow emerged from his concealment, and on 20 June surrendered to the Speaker; but finding that his life was not assured, he succeeded in escaping to Dieppe, France, travelled to Geneva and Lausanne, and thence to Vevey, Switzerland. On 16 April 1662, the canton of Bern granted Ludlow and two fellow fugitives, Lisle and Cawley, an act of protection allowing them to live in the canton. His wife joined him in 1663. For security, he adopted the pseudonym of Edmund Phillips, based on a variant of his mother's maiden name.

After the Glorious Revolution of 1688 opened up the prospect of a return, in 1689 Ludlow came back to England. He was however remembered only as a regicide, and an address from the House of Commons was presented to William III by Sir Edward Seymour requesting the king to issue a proclamation for his arrest. Ludlow escaped again, and returned to Vevey, where he died in 1692.

== Reputation and writings ==
A monument raised to Ludlow's memory by his widow is in the church of St Martin in Vevey. Over the door of the house in which he lived was placed the inscription "omne solum forti patria, quia patris". This is a Christianized version of a line by Ovid meaning "to the brave man every land is a fatherland because God his father made it". Ludlow married Elizabeth, daughter of William Thomas, of Wenvoe, Glamorganshire, but left no children.

During his exile, Ludlow wrote an autobiography entitled A voyce from the watch tower. After his death, his manuscript was obtained by Slingsby Bethel, who had visited him in Switzerland. Part of it, covering the years 1660–77, was discovered at Warwick Castle in 1970 and is now in the Bodleian Library. A heavily rewritten and shortened version of A voyce appeared as The Memoirs of Edmund Ludlow in 1698–99 in three volumes. The historian Blair Worden has surmised that the editor was the deist John Toland. The Memoirs were part of a range of late seventeenth-century publications printed by John Darby, including the Discourses of Algernon Sidney and the works of John Milton and James Harrington. In the Memoirs Ludlow's puritanism is virtually written out, and his views changed to make him a Whig-like secular republican. Until the 1970s the Memoirs were generally assumed to be authentic – there were editions in 1720–1722, 1751, and 1771, with a scholarly edition by C.H. Firth in 1895. As a result, the Memoirs have been used until very recently as a major source for historians of the seventeenth century, with only the rediscovery of Ludlow's original manuscript prompting a reassessment.

In 1691–1693 four pamphlets were published in Ludlow's name. Like the Memoirs after them, they were a contribution to the Whig cause. Contemporaries variously attributed them to Slingsby Bethel, John Phillips (Milton's nephew), Thomas Percival, and John Toland.

Parliament of England
Preceded by Sir James Thynne; Sir Henry Ludlow	Member of Parliament for Wiltshire; 1646–1653; With: Hon. James Herbert 1646–1648	Succeeded by Sir Anthony Ashley Cooper; Nicholas Green; Thomas Eyre
Preceded by Not represented in Second Protectorate Parliament	Member of Parliament for Hindon; 1659; With: Edward Tooker	Succeeded by Robert Reynolds
Political offices
Preceded by Henry Cromwell (Lord Deputy)	Commander-in-Chief of Ireland; 1659–1660	Succeeded by The Duke of Albemarle (Lord Lieutenant)
