= John Davies (poet, born 1569) =

English poet, lawyer, and politician (1569–1626)

Sir John Davies
- Born: Wiltshire, England
- Baptised: 16 April 1569
- Died: 8 December 1626 (aged 57); Englefield House, Berkshire, England
- Occupations: Poet; lawyer; politician

Sir John Davies (16 April 1569 (baptised) – 8 December 1626) was an English poet, lawyer, and politician who sat in the House of Commons at various times between 1597 and 1621. He became Attorney General for Ireland and formulated many of the legal principles that underpinned the British Empire.

== Early life ==
Davies was born in Wiltshire, possibly at Chicksgrove Manor at Lower Chicksgrove, to John and Mary Davies. He was educated at Winchester College for four years, a period in which he showed much interest in literature. He studied there until the age of sixteen and went to further his education at the Queen's College, Oxford, where he stayed for just eighteen months, with most historians questioning whether he received a degree.

Davies spent some time at New Inn after his departure from Oxford, and it was at this point that he decided to pursue a career in law. In 1588 he enrolled in the Middle Temple, where he did well academically, although suffering constant reprimands for his behaviour. Following several suspensions, his behaviour cost him his enrolment.

Davies travelled to the Netherlands in 1592 with others of the Middle Temple (William Fleetwood, Richard Martin). There, in Leiden, he met the jurist Paul Merula, to whom the group had a letter of introduction from William Camden.

In 1594, Davies's poetry brought him into contact with Queen Elizabeth. She wished him to continue his study of law at the Middle Temple and had him sworn in as a servant-in-ordinary. In the following year, his poem, Orchestra, was published in July, prior to his call to the bar from the Middle Temple. He was elected Member of Parliament for Shaftesbury in 1597.

In February 1598, Davies was disbarred for the offence of entering the dining hall of the Inns in the company of two swordsmen and striking Richard Martin with a cudgel. The victim Martin was a noted wit who had insulted him in public, and Davies immediately took a boat at the Temple steps and retired to Oxford, where he chose to write poetry. Another of his works, Nosce Teipsum ("Know Thyself"), was published in 1599 and found favour with the queen and with Lord Mountjoy, later Lord Deputy of Ireland.

Davies became a favourite of the queen, to whom he addressed his work Hymns to Astraea in 1599. Later that year, however, his Epigrams was included in a list of published works that the state ordered to be confiscated and burned. In 1601 he was readmitted to the bar, having made a public apology to Martin, and in the same year sat as the member of Parliament for Corfe Castle.

In 1603, he was part of the deputation sent to bring King James VI of Scotland to London as the new monarch. The Scots king was also an admirer of Davies's poetry, and rewarded him with a knighthood and appointments (at Mountjoy's recommendation) as solicitor-general and, later attorney-general, in Ireland.

== Ireland ==
Davies arrived in Dublin in November 1603, where Mountjoy had accepted the submission of the rebel Hugh O'Neill some six months earlier, at the close of the Nine Years War.

Finding pestilence and famine all over Ireland, Davies noted that the courts still commanded respect, but that the sloth of the protestant clergy and the ruin of the churches were detrimental to religion. He condemned the practice of issuing debased coinage and, in pursuit of the establishment of regular quarter-sessions of the courts, went on the Leinster circuit through seven counties in April 1604. In 1605 he travelled to England with the commendation of Sir Arthur Chichester, who succeeded Mountjoy in government, and had returned to Ireland by July.

Davies was very much committed to reform not just in the law but in religious affairs too. He was all for banishing Catholic clergy from Ireland and for enforcing church attendances, and strict measures to this end were taken on his return. He delivered a powerful speech on 23 November 1605 in the Court of Castle Chamber, dealing with the summonsing of recusants to answer their contempt of the king's proclamations.

In May 1606, he submitted his report of his circuit of the province of Munster to Sir Robert Cecil, the king's secretary, and was made serjeant at law after his appointment as Attorney General. In the summer he travelled through counties Monaghan, Fermanagh and Cavan, and a year later through Meath, Westmeath, Longford, King's and Queen's counties, both of which circuits he reported to Cecil. Davies always looked at Ireland as a stepping-stone towards major political office in England but he knew that his chances were hurt by the death of Cecil, his patron, and his own absence from the court.

Davies became heavily involved in government efforts to establish a plantation in the lately rebellious province of Ulster. In September 1607, he delivered to Cecil his report of the Flight of the Earls, a seminal event in Irish history and, before long, had travelled into the absent earls' territories to lay indictments against them there.

In August 1608, he went with Chichester to view the escheated lands, reporting that the people, "wondered as much to see the king's deputy as the ghosts in Vurgil wondered to see AEneas alive in hell[sic]". In October, he was in England, pushing for the plantation of the province.

In May 1609, Davies was made serjeant, with a grant of lands valued at £40 p.a. He revisited England in 1610 on plantation business, which had so advanced that he thought his assistance to the commission charged with bringing the project to fruition would no longer be needed.

In 1610, he defended proceedings brought by the Irish against the plans for the plantation of Cavan, but in the following year, he begged for recall from Ireland. At about this time he wrote the Discoverie of the True Causes why Ireland was never entirely subdued (pub. 1612), a well-written – albeit polemical – account of the constitutional standing of Ireland.

== Speaker of the Irish House of Commons ==
In England, Davies spent much time preparing the way for the Irish Parliament of 1613, to which he was returned for County Fermanagh. In the first sitting, he was proposed as speaker with the Crown's approval, but he met fierce opposition from the Catholic members, who formed a very large minority and nominated a former High Court judge, Sir John Everard, the knight of the shire for County Tipperary. Everard was an open recusant, and despite his behaviour on this occasion, a man of good reputation. A scene of comical disorder ensued when Everard was placed in the chair and refused to vacate in favour of the government candidate. Davies, always a very heavy man, was seized by his own supporters and lifted bodily into his opponent's lap; Everard was then ejected from the chair and withdrew from the chamber with 98 supporters, whereupon the vote was taken in their absence. Davies was approved as speaker by Chichester, and delivered a memorable speech on the history and role of parliament in Ireland. Everard, his rival, was summoned to England and briefly imprisoned, but was quickly pardoned and thereafter loyally supported the Crown.

In 1615, Davies's reports of Irish cases were published; he had appeared as counsel in many of these, including the case of the Bann fishery and the cases of tanistry and gavelkind, which set precedents in Irish constitutional law, with wider implications for British colonial policy.

== Later career ==
In 1617 Davies failed to win the position of Solicitor General for England and Wales and consequently resigned as Attorney-General in Ireland, having ensured that he would be replaced by his nephew William Ryves. In 1619 he returned to England permanently, in the expectation that his chance of gaining office there would be improved by his presence. He practised as king's serjeant, and eventually went on circuit as a judge. He was a founder member of the Society of Antiquaries. In 1621, he was elected MP for Hindon, and Newcastle-under-Lyme, choosing to sit for the latter constituency. He occasionally spoke in parliament on Irish matters. Davies retired to Englefield House in Berkshire, but was then appointed Lord Chief Justice. He had always been corpulent, and on 7 December 1626 he died in his bed of apoplexy brought on after a supper party, and thus never enjoyed the appointment he had been angling for throughout his career.

== Poetry ==
Davies wrote poetry in numerous forms, but is best known for his epigrammes and sonnets. In 1599 he published Nosce Teipsum (Know thyself) and Hymnes of Astraea. Queen Elizabeth became an admirer of Davies's work, and these poems contain acrostics that spell out the phrase Elisabetha Regina. (Note: A list of his works can be found at: Jokinen, Anniina (1 November 2009) [1996]. "The Works of Sir John Davies". Luminarium Encyclopedia.)

His most famous poem, Nosce Teipsum, gained him the favour of James I, by which he won promotion in Ireland. The three-part poem is written in decasyllabic quatrains, and is concerned with one's self-knowledge and the immortality of the soul. A. H. Bullen described it as being "singularly readable for such a subject: highly accomplished verse, no Elizabethan quaintness, both subtle and terse".

Bullen also described Davies's Orchestra, or a Poem of Dancing as "brilliant and graceful". This poem, written in rhyme royal, reveals a typical Elizabethan pleasure: contemplating and trying to understand the relationship between the natural order and human activity.

Davies's works are very well represented in Elizabethan anthologies. The last complete edition of his poems appeared in 1876 and is long out of print.

== Legacy ==
In political terms, Davies was significant in his work on constitutional law and in framing the terms of the Plantation of Ulster, a model that served the English crown as it extended its colonial reach in North America and elsewhere. In literary terms, he was a fine poet who lay quite neglected from the mid-17th century, until his cause was championed by T. S. Eliot. Davies's poem "I know my soul hath power to know all things" was set to music by the composer Hubert Parry in his choral work, Songs of Farewell (1916–18).

== Family and death ==
Davies married Eleanor Touchet, daughter of the first Earl of Castlehaven, in March of 1609. She was one of the most prolific women writing in early seventeenth-century England, author of almost seventy pamphlets and prophecies, and one of the first women in England to see her works through to print.

During the marriage, Eleanor published numerous books of prophecy, particularly anagrammatic prophecies; her prophetic writings were a source of conflict in the marriage and Davies burned a set of the prophecies that Eleanor had been writing. Davies was exasperated by his wife's excesses and once addressed her, "I pray you weep not while I am alive, and I will give you leave to laugh when I am dead". She is said to have accurately foretold the date of his death and wore mourning clothes for the three years leading up to the predicted time: as the date approached – three days before – she "gave him pass to take his long sleep".

Davies had three children by his marriage. His only son to survive infancy, John (Jack), was deaf and dumb; his daughter Lucy married Ferdinando Hastings and became Countess of Huntingdon.

On 28 July 1625, Eleanor was working on a commentary of the Book of Daniel and believed she heard the voice of the prophet; she wrote about the experience and took it to the Archbishop of Canterbury. When Davies found and burned her writing she predicted he would die within three years, and went into mourning. In November 1626, Davies was appointed to high office in England. In early December, following her husband's appointment, Eleanor started weeping during a dinner with friends. When asked why, she explained it was in anticipation of Davies's funeral. Davies was found in his home, dead of apoplexy, on the morning of 8 December.

In 1633, Eleanor was brought before the high commission in England on charges relating to her religious anagram practices. During a fruitless examination of her under oath, one of the commissioners devised an anagram of his own: Dame Eleanor Davys – never so mad a ladye. She was sent to prison, and afterwards remarried, but was deserted by her new husband and buried next to Davies on her death in 1652. She had continued to make prophesies until her death.

== Footnotes ==
=== References ===
- Canny, Nicholas P. (2001). Making Ireland British, 1580–1650. Oxford University Press. ISBN 0-19-820091-9.
- Dictionary of National Biography 22 vols. (London, 1921–1922).
- Shapiro, James (2005). 1599: A Year in the Life of William Shakespeare. London: Faber and Faber. ISBN 0-571-21480-0.
- O'Donoghue, Fergus (January 1990). "Book Reviews: Modern European". Catholic Historical Review. 76 (I).
- Coates, Ben (April 2005). "Sir John Davies (1569–1626)". History Today. 55 (4).
- Rowse, A. L. (September 1976). "Sir John Davies in Literature and History". History Today. 26 (9).
- Johnson, Francis R. (September 1942). "The Poems of Sir John Davies (Book)". Modern Language Quarterly. 3 (3). doi:10.1215/00267929-3-3-479.
- Chisholm, Hugh, ed. (1911). "Davies, Sir John" . Encyclopædia Britannica. Vol. 7 (11th ed.). Cambridge University Press. pp. 864–865.

Parliament of England
Preceded by Michael Hicks; Arthur Atye	Member of Parliament for Shaftesbury; 1597; With: John Budden	Succeeded by Arthur Messenger; John Budden
Preceded by	Member of Parliament for Corfe Castle; 1601; With: John Durning	Succeeded by Edward Dackombe; Sir John Hobart
Preceded by Sir Edmund Ludlow (Sir) Henry Mervyn	Member of Parliament for Hindon; 1621–1622; With: Sir Edmund Ludlow	Succeeded by Lawrence Hyde; Matthew Davies
Legal offices
Preceded by Charles Calthorpe	Attorney-General for Ireland; 1606-1619	Succeeded by William Ryves
Political offices
Preceded by Nicholas Walsh	Speaker of the Irish House of Commons; 1613–1615	Succeeded by Nathaniel Catelyn
