= William Sotwell =

William Sotwell (1571–1639) was an English landowner and politician who sat in the House of Commons between 1621 and 1624.

== Biography ==
Sotwell, born on 23 November 1571, was the eldest son of John Sotwell, clerk, of Penistone, Yorkshire, and Andover, Hants, and Mary, daughter of Christopher Ellis of Rothwell, Yorkshire. He was educated at Magdalen College, Oxford (1590) and Lincoln's Inn (1590) and was called to the bar in 1598.

Sotwell was a landowner of Greenham, Berkshire. He also inherited property at North Tidworth and Andover. In 1621, he was elected Member of Parliament for Ludgershall. He was re-elected for the seat in 1624. He died on 18 June 1639.

== Family ==
Sotwell married Eleanor (died 1607), third daughter of William Knight of Thatcham, Berkshire. They had a son and three daughters. The son and two daughters predeceased their father; the surviving daughter Elizabeth married firstly Francis Trenchard of Cutteridge, Wiltshire and secondly John Bulkeley.

== Notes ==
Parliament of England
Preceded by Charles Danvers; James Kirton	Member of Parliament for Ludgershall; 1621; With: Alexander Chocke; Edward Kyrton	Succeeded by Robert Pye; Sir Thomas Hinton
