= Hungerford Park =

Country house in Berkshire, England

Coordinates: 51°25′59″N 1°31′38″W

Hungerford Park was a country house and surrounding estate in the English county of Berkshire, within the civil parish of Hungerford. It was demolished in 1958 or 1960.

The house lay south of the A4 road and approximately 1.3 miles (2.1 km) south-east of Hungerford. It was an 18th-century building, substantially altered in 1934.
