= Henry Ludlow (died 1643) =

English landowner and politician

Sir Henry Ludlow (c. 1592–1643) was an English landowner and politician who sat in the House of Commons at various times between 1614 and 1643.

Ludlow was born at Maiden Bradley, Wiltshire, the son of Sir Edmund Ludlow and his second wife Lady Margaret Howard, widow of Thomas Howard, 1st Viscount Howard of Bindon, and daughter of Sir Henry Manning, knight marshal of the Household. He matriculated at Brasenose College, Oxford on 16 October 1607 aged 15 and graduated BA on 6 February 1609. In 1614, he was elected Member of Parliament for Heytesbury. He was re-elected MP for Heytesbury in 1621 and 1624. He inherited the estate of Maiden Bradley. In 1633 he was Sheriff of Wiltshire.

Ludlow is perhaps best known for farting in the House of Commons, when Sir John Croke read a message to the chamber on 4 March 1607. The fart gave rise to one of Stuart England's most popular political poems, entitled 'The Censure of the Parliament Fart', or, more simply 'The Parliament Fart'.

In November 1640, Ludlow was elected MP for Wiltshire in the Long Parliament and sat until his death in 1643.

Ludlow died at the age of about 51 and was buried on 1 November 1643 at St Andrews, Holborn, London.

Ludlow married Elizabeth Phelips, daughter of Richard Phelips of Montacute, Somerset and had three daughters and six sons including Edmund, the regicide. Ludlow's half-brother also named Henry was an MP.

Parliament of England
Preceded by Sir William Eyre; Walter Gowen	Member of Parliament for Heytesbury; 1614–1624; With: Walter Gowen 1614; Sir Thomas Thynne 1621–1624	Succeeded by Sir Charles Berkeley; Edward Bysshe
Preceded by Sir Francis Seymour; Philip Lord Herbert	Member of Parliament for Wiltshire; 1640–1643; With: Sir James Thynne	Succeeded by Hon. James Herbert; Edmund Ludlow
