= Edward Kyrton =

Member of the House of Commons of England

Edward Kyrton, or Edward Kirton (1585–1654), was an English politician who sat in the House of Commons variously between 1624 and 1645. He supported the Royalist side in the English Civil War.

== Biography ==
Kyrton, baptised on 15 May 1585 was the son of Daniel Kirton (died 1591) of Almsford Park, Somerset, and Frances. He graduated from Oxford with an MA in 1643 (the Royalist capital during the Civil War).

Kyrton lived at Castle Cary, and was steward to the Marquis of Hertford. In 1621 he was returned as Member of Parliament for Newcastle-Under-Lyme In 1624 he was returned MP for Ludgershall, Wiltshire. He was returned MP for Marlborough in 1625 and 1626. In 1628 he was elected MP for Great Bedwyn and sat until 1629 when King Charles I decided to rule without parliament for eleven years.

In April 1640, Kyrton was elected MP for Milborne Port, Somerset in the Short Parliament. He was re-elected MP for Milborne Port in November 1640 for the Long Parliament. His support for the Royalist cause led to his being disabled from sitting in the Westminster Parliament in August 1642, and his subsequent sitting in King Charles's Oxford Parliament (1644–1645).

After the Battle of Worcester the young King Charles II stopped with Kyrton at Castle Cary during his flight to France. Kyrton died and was buried on 30 January 1654.

== Family ==
In 1618 Kyrton married Margaret Baud, daughter of Ferdinando Baud of Walgrave, Northants who survived him. It is unknown if they had children, but none survived him.

== Notes ==
Parliament of England
Preceded by Alexander Chocke; William Sotwell	Member of Parliament for Ludgershall; 1624; With: William Sotwell	Succeeded by Robert Pye; Sir Robert Hinton
Preceded by Sir Francis Seymour; Richard Digges	Member of Parliament for Marlborough; 1625–1626; With: Richard Digges	Succeeded by Richard Digges; Henry Piercy
Preceded by John Selden; Sir Maurice Berkeley	Member of Parliament for Great Bedwyn; 1628–1629; With: John Trevor	Parliament suspended until 1640
Vacant Parliament suspended since 1629	Member of Parliament for Milborne Port; 1640; With: Thomas Erle 1640; John Digby 1640–1642	Succeeded by William Carent; Thomas Grove
