= Robert Myddelton (died 1616) =

Welsh politician

Robert Myddelton (or Middleton) (c. 1563 – 1616) was a Welsh politician who served as MP for Weymouth and Melcombe Regis and the City of London in the Parliament of England.

== Early life ==
Myddelton was born c. 1563 at Denbigh Castle in Denbigh, Wales, of which his father was governor. He was the seventh son of Jane (née Dryhurst) Myddelton and Richard Myddelton (c. 1509–1577/8) of Galch Hill, Henllan who was also MP for Denbigh Boroughs. Among his siblings were Sir Thomas Myddelton, a Lord Mayor of London, William Myddelton, a poet and seaman who died at Antwerp in 1621, and Sir Hugh Myddelton, 1st Baronet, a wealthy merchant and clothmaker who was appointed Royal Jeweller by King James VI and I.

His paternal grandparents were Fulk Myddelton of Llansannan and Margaret (née Smith) Myddelton. His maternal grandparents were Hugh Dryhurst, alderman of Denbigh, and Lucy (née Grimsditch) Dryhurst.

== Career ==
He apprenticed as a skinner in London under Erasmus Harby, beginning in 1582. After leaving London, he moved to Weymouth where he married the stepdaughter of Thomas Barefoot, an MP for Weymouth and Melcombe Regis. By 1597, he was living in London as neighbour to fellow apprentice, and brother-in-law and business partner, Robert Bateman. He became involved in Merchant Adventurer shipping cloth to Germany and was one of the original investors in the East India Company, jointly investing £500 with Bateman and his brother Sir Thomas in 1599.

Myddleton was returned to Parliament for Weymouth at the general election of 1604, during Barefoot's mayoralty. His brother Hugh also sat in the Commons as Member for Denbigh Boroughs, his father's former seat. In May 1604, Myddleton acquired the receivership of Crown lands in Dorset and Somerset from Alderman Sir Thomas Smythe, but he quickly passed them onto Lionel Cranfield (later 1st Earl of Middlesex), another London merchant.

Following the end of the Anglo-Spanish War in 1604, Myddleton and his partners were major exporters of cloth, and he joined the Levant Company in 1605 and the newly formed Spanish Company in 1606. In 1611, "the East India Company sent Myddelton, by then one of their governing committee, to Amsterdam to consult with their Dutch counterparts."

At the 1614 general election, Myddelton's partner Bateman was elected at Weymouth, and he was returned as junior burgess for the City of London.

== Personal life ==
On 27 July 1591, Myddelton was married to Margaret Mounsell (d. 1610), a daughter of John Mounsell, merchant of Weymouth, and the stepdaughter of Thomas Barefoot. Her sister, Mary Mounsell, was married to William Whiteway, MP for Dorchester, and they were the parents of John Whiteway. Together, they were the parents of ten sons, five of whom predeceased him, and four daughters, including:

- Peter Middleton (1603–1661), who represented Weymouth in the Commons in 1659 and 1660; he married Mary Parry, widow of Fulke Parry.

After the death of his first wife, Myddelton was married to Eleanor (née Saltonstall) Harvie (1554–c. 1601) on 24 February 1612. Eleanor, the widow of Vincent Harvie, was a daughter of Lord Mayor of London Sir Richard Saltonstall and the former Suzanna Poyntz. Her sister, Elizabeth Saltonstall, was married to Richard Wyche, and her brother, Peter Saltonstall, equerry at the court of James VI and I. Another sister, Hester Saltonstall, was married to Robert's elder brother, Sir Thomas Myddelton, the parents of Thomas Myddelton, also an MP.

Myddelton died in 1616 and was buried with his first wife in the family vault at St Dunstan-in-the-East on 13 June 1616. His 1613 will bequeathed 2,000 marks to his wife and one-third of his goods to his nine surviving children. In addition, he bequeathed £200 to the Denbigh corporation and £100 to Weymouth "to establish revolving loans for young merchants."

Parliament of England
Preceded by John Peyton; Walter Cope; Richard Swayne; Edward Reynolds	Member of Parliament for Weymouth and Melcombe Regis; 1604–1611; With: Thomas Barefoot (1604–1610); Viscount Cranborne (1610–1611); Robert White (1604–1610); Barnard Michell (1610–1611); Sir John Hanham (1604–1611)	Succeeded by Sir Charles Caesar; Robert Bateman; Barnard Michell; John Roy
Preceded by Nicholas Fuller; Sir Henry Montague; Sir Henry Billingsley; Richard Gore	Member of Parliament for City of London; 1614–1616; With: Nicholas Fuller; Sir Henry Montague; Sir Thomas Lowe	Succeeded by William Towerson; Robert Heath; Robert Bateman; Sir Thomas Middleton
