= Richard Gore =

English merchant adventurer and politician

Richard Gore (died 1622) was an English merchant adventurer and politician who sat in the House of Commons from 1604–1611.

== Life ==
Gore was the son of Gerard Gore, an alderman of the City of London. He was auditor from 1601–1603. In 1604, Gore was elected Member of Parliament for City of London and sat until 1611. He was Auditor again from 1606–1608.

Gore went to live at Hamburg in connection with the merchant adventurers and lived there many years before his death in 1622.

Gore was the brother of Sir John Gore, Lord Mayor in 1624/25, and of William Gore, alderman and Sheriff in 1615/16.

Parliament of England
Preceded by Stephen Soame; John Croke; Thomas Fettiplace; John Pynder	Member of Parliament for City of London; 1604–1611; With: Nicholas Fuller; Sir Henry Montague; Sir Thomas Lowe	Succeeded by Nicholas Fuller; Sir Henry Montague; Sir Thomas Lowe; Robert Bateman
