= James Bunce =

James Bunce is the name of:

== Baronets ==
- Sir James Bunce, 1st Baronet (c. 1600–1670), Sheriff of the City of London
- Sir James Bunce, 4th Baronet (died c. 1710) of the Bunce baronets
- Sir James Bunce, 6th Baronet (died 1741) of the Bunce baronets

== Others ==
- James Bunce (MP) (1563–1642), MP for City of London
- James E. Bunce (1924–2015), American historian

== See also ==
- Bunce (surname)
- James (disambiguation)
