= Robert Bromfield =

English timber merchant and politician

Robert Bromfield (died 1647) was an English timber merchant and politician who sat in the House of Commons between 1621 and 1624.

Bromfield was described as a "woodmonger", in the diary of Philip Henslowe, of whose will he was one of the overseers in 1616. He leased a wharf in Southwark from 1601.

In 1621, Bromfield was elected Member of Parliament for Southwark. In the same year, he obtained a mortgage of Hammonds Place, Clayton Sussex, which by 1666 was in the hands of Sir Edward Bromfield, 2nd Baronet. He was re-elected MP for Southwark in 1624. In 1625 Bromfield and Thomas Overman bought Montague House and Montague Close, including various wharves and buildings around Southwark Priory, from Anthony-Maria Browne, 2nd Viscount Montagu; Bromfield redeveloped the site to make the buildings "suitable for men of better ability". He purchased Merton Grange, Merton for £2,100 in 1629.

Bromfield probably died in 1647 and was buried in Lambourne Church, Essex. He was related to Edward Bromfield, who was Lord Mayor of London in 1636 and was father of the first baronet.

Parliament of England
Preceded by Richard Yarward; Edward Cox	Member of Parliament for Southwark; 1621; With: Richard Yarward	Succeeded by Richard Yarward; William Cox
