= William Towerson =

English merchant and politician

William Towerson (died c. 1630) was an English merchant and politician who sat in the House of Commons at various times between 1621 and 1629.

Towerson was a member of the Worshipful Company of Skinners. He was the first Deputy-Governor of the Irish Society from 1610 to 1613. He was on the Committee of the East India Company from 1619 to 1622, until retiring after the execution of his brother Gabriel in the Amboyna massacre.

In 1621, he was elected Member of Parliament for City of London. He was elected MP for Portsmouth in 1628 and sat until 1628 when King Charles decided to rule without parliament for eleven years.

Towerson died between 7 May 1630 when he made his will and 16 January 1631 when it was proved.

Parliament of England
Preceded by Nicholas Fuller; Sir Henry Montague; Robert Myddelton; Sir Thomas Lowe	Member of Parliament for City of London; 1621–1622; With: Robert Heath; Robert Bateman; Sir Thomas Lowe	Succeeded by Sir Thomas Middleton; Heneage Finch; Robert Bateman; Martin Bond
Preceded by Sir James Fullerton; Thomas Whatman	Member of Parliament for Portsmouth; 1628–1629; With: Owen Jennens	Parliament suspended until 1640
