= Bunce (surname) =

Bunce is a surname. Notable people with the surname include:

- Alan Bunce (1900–1965), American actor
- Che Bunce, New Zealand (All White) soccer player
- David Bunce, music producer
- Don Bunce (1949–2003), American quarterback
- Elizabeth C. Bunce, American author
- Emma Bunce (born 1975), British astrophysicist
- Francis M. Bunce (1836–1901), United States Navy admiral
- Frank Bunce, New Zealand (All Black Rugby union player
- Fred Bunce, American professional baseball umpire
- H. C. Bunce, American professional baseball umpire
- James Bunce (disambiguation)
- Sir James Bunce, 1st Baronet Bunce (c. 1600–1670)
- Sir James Bunce, 4th Baronet Bunce (died c. 1710)
- Sir James Bunce, 6th Baronet Bunce (died 1741)
- John Patrick Bunce, reality TV star on the show Bering Sea Gold (1985–2012)
- Sir John Bunce, 2nd Baronet Bunce (1630–1683)
- Sir John Bunce, 3rd Baronet Bunce (c. 1659–1687)
- Sir John Bunce, 5th Baronet Bunce (died c. 1720)
- Joseph H. Bunce, Mayor of Louisville, Kentucky, USA
- Josh Bunce (1847–1912), left fielder and umpire
- John Thackray Bunce (1828–1899), English newspaper editor and author, father of Kate Bunce
- Kate Elizabeth Bunce (1856–1927), English poet and painter, daughter of John Thackray Bunce
- Larry Bunce, basketball player
- Leela Bunce, radio personality
- Oliver Bell Bunce (1828–1890), American author, editor, and playwright
- Paddy Bunce, sports radio reporter
- Pips Bunce, British banking executive
- Steve Bunce, British sports journalist specialising in boxing
- Stuart Bunce, English actor
- Vikki Bunce, field hockey player
- William Bunce, English footballer
- William Bunce (cricketer) (1911–1981)
- Zephaniah W. Bunce, American businessman and politician
- Chauncey Bunce Brewster (1848–1941) bishop

Pseudonyms

- Henry Shapcott Bunce, penname of Shapcott Wensley

Fictional Characters

- Nate Bunce, a main antagonist of Fantastic Mr. Fox
- Jack Bunce, alias Altamont, a character in Scott's The Pirate.

== See also ==
- Bunce baronets
- Bunce (disambiguation)
