= Robert Bateman (MP) =

English merchant and politician

Robert Bateman (1560 – 11 December 1644) was an English merchant and politician who sat in the House of Commons between 1614 and 1626.

== Biography ==
Bateman was the son of Richard Bateman of Hartington and his wife Ellen Topleyes, daughter of William Topleyes of Tissington Derbyshire. He was baptised at Hartington on 8 September 1561. He was an eminent merchant in the City of London and a member of the Worshipful Company of Skinners.

In 1614, Bateman was elected Member of Parliament for Weymouth and Melcombe Regis in the Addled Parliament. He was a member of the committee of the East India Company from 1614 to 1619 and a City auditor from 1617 to 1619. In 1619 he became treasurer of the East India Company and retained the post until his death. He was master of the Skinners Company in 1620. In 1621, he was elected MP for City of London. He was one of the court assistants for the Levant Company from 1622 to 1624. In 1624 he was re-elected MP for City of London and was re-elected in 1625 and 1626. He became City Chamberlain in 1626 and held the position until his death. He was sworn and discharged as alderman of Cordwainer ward, for a fine of £400 on 23 June 1629. He founded and endowed a divinity lectureship at Ashbourne.

Bateman died at the age of 84, bequeathing lands in Essex, Dorset and Denbighshire.

Bateman married Elizabeth Westrow daughter of John Westrow. They had four sons who were aldermen of the City of London and who suffered severe losses as a result of the Great Fire of London. Anthony became Lord Mayor of London, and William was created a baronet.

Parliament of England
Preceded by Viscount Cranborne; Robert Myddelton; Bernard Michell; Sir John Hanham	Member of Parliament for Weymouth and Melcombe Regis; 1614; With: Sir Charles Caesar; Bernard Michell; John Roy	Succeeded by Matthew Pitt; Giles Green; John Freke; Christopher Erle
Preceded by Nicholas Fuller; Sir Henry Montague; Sir Thomas Lowe; Robert Myddelton	Member of Parliament for City of London; 1621–1629; With: William Towerson 1621; Sir Thomas Lowe 1621; Robert Heath 1621; Sir Thomas Middleton 1624–1626; Heneage Finch 1624–1626; Martin Bond 1624–1625; Sir Maurice Abbot 1626	Succeeded by Thomas Moulson; Christopher Clitherow; Henry Waller; James Bunce
