= Robert Heath =

English judge and politician

Sir Robert Heath
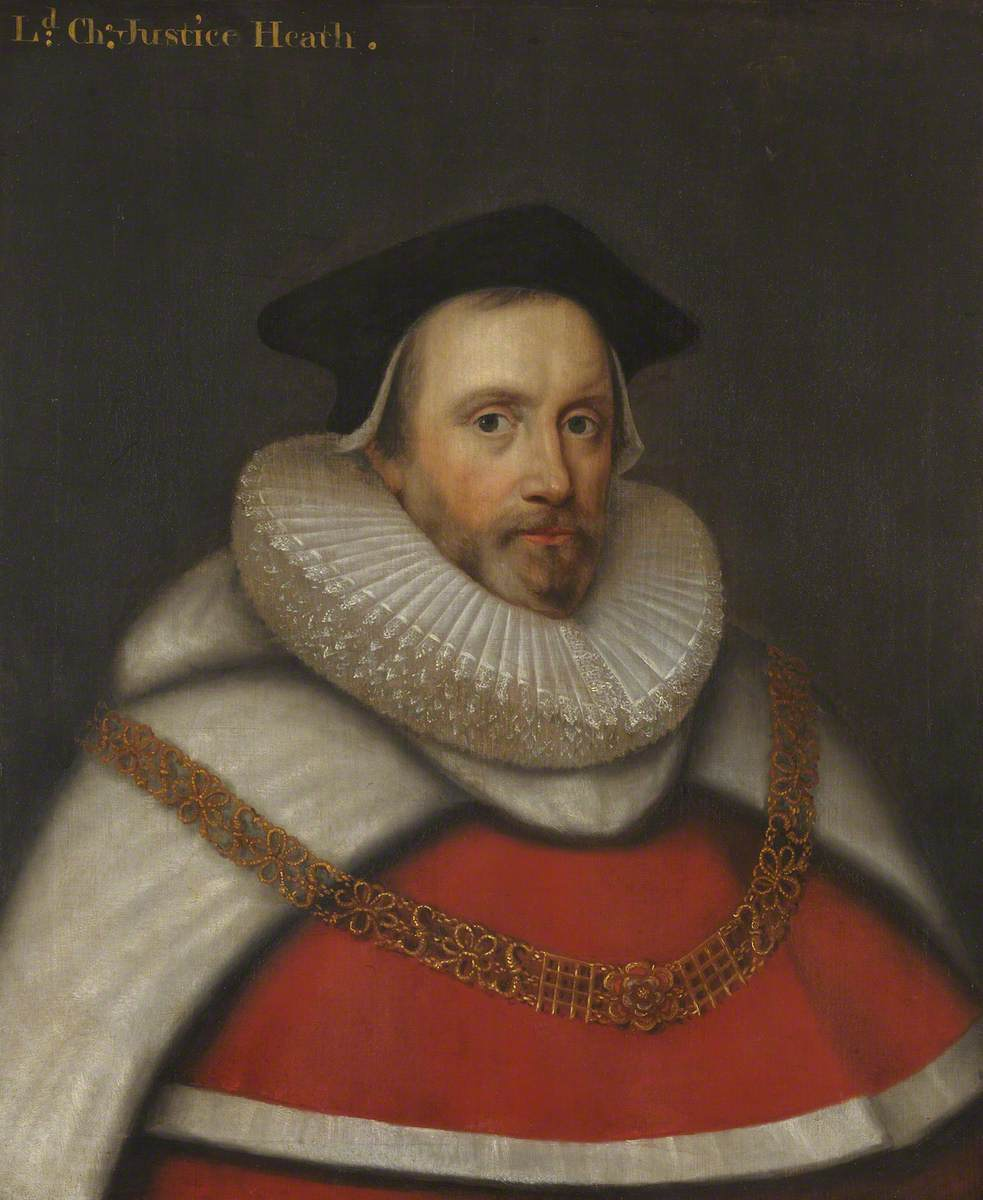
- Born: 20 May 1575; Edenbridge, Kent
- Died: 30 August 1649 (aged 74); Calais, France
- Resting place: St. Martin’s Anglican Church, Brasted, Westerham, Kent

Sir Robert Heath (20 May 1575 – 30 August 1649) was an English judge and politician who sat in the House of Commons from 1621 to 1625.

== Early life ==
Heath was the son of Robert Heath, attorney, and Anne Posyer. He was educated at Tunbridge grammar school (Tonbridge School), St John's College, Cambridge from age 14 and Clifford's Inn from age 17. He became a barrister of the Inner Temple in 1603.

By 1620, he was listed as one of the 40 patent holders for the Council for New England as the "Recorder of our Citie of London." In 1621 he was elected Member of Parliament for the City of London. He became solicitor-general in 1621, when he was knighted. In 1624 he was elected MP for East Grinstead and was re-elected in 1625.

== Family ==
He married Margaret Miller, daughter of John Miller of Kent, and had six children, including Robert, John and Mary, who married the Royalist politician Sir William Morley of Halnaker.

== Attorney General ==
Heath served King Charles I as Attorney General, from 1625. He owed his appointment to the influence of the Duke of Buckingham. Despite a reputation as a shadowy, opaque figure, records show him able to argue shrewdly and independently in order to reduce problems for the Crown.

Heath brought a 1625 case in the Exchequer Court for the High Peak lead miners against Francis Leke who claimed a tithe from them. Through the offices of Heath, the tithe right was eventually transferred, in a possibly corrupt way, to Christian, Countess of Devonshire. From 1629, he was taking an entrepreneurial interest in the lead mines of Derbyshire, engaging Sir Cornelius Vermuyden as a partner in a major drainage operation at Wirksworth, at the ore-rich Dovegang Rake.

Heath argued for the Crown in Darnel's Case (the Five Knights' Case) of 1627. The judges rejected his argument on absolute prerogative; and a scandal blighted his reputation the following year, when it was revealed, or alleged, by John Selden that he had interfered with the King's Bench records (a felony), in order to promote the decision in the case to a binding precedent (an interpretation that has recently been disputed by Mark Kishlansky). The agitation caused by the business was of major importance for the formulation of the Petition of Right.

Heath notionally founded both North Carolina and South Carolina. He was on a commission to consider the tobacco trade with Virginia in 1627–8. In 1629 he was awarded a patent for the Province of Carolina; but in fact he made no settlements there. The grant also mentioned the Bahamas, the beginning of their colonial history.

== Judge ==
Heath became Chief Justice of the Court of Common Pleas in 1631. He lost this position, however, in September 1634. One theory why is that his religious stance had led him to oppose William Laud. In religion he was a Calvinist and anti-Arminian; he had shown some leniency in the Star Chamber case against the iconoclast and extremist Henry Sherfield.

Another theory relates to corruption. On the other hand, this is not accepted by Thomas G. Barnes, who argues that Heath with Sir Richard Shelton had displeased the King, and on an old matter: plantations in Ulster and the obligations of the City of London in an agreement made under James I, as interpreted in a lax fashion by the law officers of the Crown (Heath as Attorney General, Shelton as Solicitor General). The matter surfaced in a Star Chamber case in mid-1634. The King dismissed Heath with conditions making sure he could not join the defence team in this case.

Heath returned to his practice as a barrister. His reputation as pro-Puritan, anti-Laudian did him no harm with the Long Parliament when Charles brought him back as a judge, making him Lord Chief Justice.

One of Heath's cases as Lord Chief Justice during the First English Civil War led to his downfall. In 1642 he tried Captain Turpin, a blockade runner, at Exeter. A year later, Sir John Berkeley, the royalist Governor of Exeter, carried out the death sentence on Turpin, as retaliation for the hanging of a Parliamentary commander who had defected to the King. Heath was impeached by Parliament for high treason in 1644. He fled England, and died on 30 August 1649 in Calais, France.

== Works ==
- Maxims and Rules of Pleading (1694)

Parliament of England
| Preceded by Nicholas Fuller; Sir Henry Montague; Robert Myddelton; Sir Thomas Lowe | Member of Parliament for City of London; 1621–1622; With: William Towerson; Robert Bateman; Sir Thomas Lowe | Succeeded by Sir Thomas Middleton; Heneage Finch; Robert Bateman; Martin Bond |
| Preceded by Sir Henry Compton; Thomas Pelham | Member of Parliament for East Grinstead; 1624–1625; With: Thomas Caldicot 1624; Sir Henry Compton 1625 | Succeeded by Robert Goodwin; Sir Henry Compton |
Legal offices
| Preceded by Sir Thomas Richardson | Chief Justice of the Common Pleas; 1631–1634 | Succeeded by Sir John Finch |
| Preceded by John Brampston | Lord Chief Justice; 1642–1645 | Succeeded by Henry Rolle |
