= Bunce =

Bunce may refer to:

== People ==
- Bunce (surname)
- Bunce baronets

== Places ==
- Bunce Island, Sierra Leone
- Bunce Court School, a German-Jewish school in Kent, England, United Kingdom, (renamed after its move from Nazi Germany)
- Bunceton, Missouri, a city, United States

== Other ==
- The Bunce, 1980 novel by Michael de Larrabeiti

== See also ==
- Titus-Bunce House
- Bunce–Deddens algebra
