= Hungerford Almshouses =

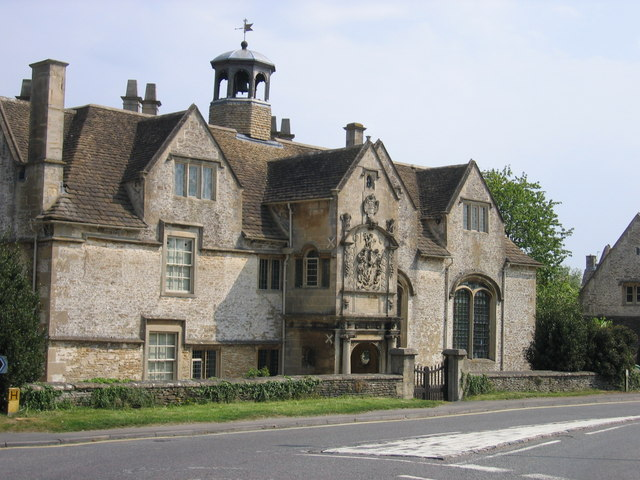

- Location within Wiltshire
- 51°26′06″N 2°10′57″W
- Location: Pound Pill, Corsham, Wiltshire, England

History
- Built: 1668
- Built for: Lady Margaret Hungerford

Listed Building – Grade I
- Designated: 1 August 1986
- Reference no.: 1022101

The Hungerford Almshouses in Corsham, Wiltshire, England, were built in 1668 for Lady Margaret Hungerford of Corsham Court. It has been designated as a Grade I listed building.

The almshouses were founded to provide homes for six (later eight) poor people and education for ten children, on a site on the eastern edge of the town, near the south entrance to Corsham Court. The L-shaped building has six houses for single women along its north-east side, each with a gable and mullioned windows; at the centre is a Baroque carving of the Hungerford arms described as "flamboyant" by Orbach. The west side has the warden's house and a combined schoolroom and chapel, and a full-height porch which is also elaborately embellished.

Margaret Hungerford was the daughter of William Holliday, a wealthy London merchant and alderman, and the widow of Sir Edward Hungerford.

In 1802, Edward Hasted was given the Mastership of The Hungerford Almshouses by his friend William Bouverie, who had become Earl of Radnor in 1765. Hasted remained Master of the Almshouse from 1807 until his death in 1812.

The site, also known as Lady Margaret Hungerford Almshouses & Schoolroom and Corsham Almshouses & 17th Century Schoolroom, is operated as a visitor attraction.
