= Christopher Clitherow =

English merchant and politician

Sir Christopher Clitherow (10 January 1578 – 11 November 1641) was an English merchant and politician who sat in the House of Commons from 1628 to 1629. He was Lord Mayor of London in 1635.

Clitherow was the son of Henry Clitherow and his wife Bridget Hewett. His father was a prosperous citizen of London and a Master of the Worshipful Company of Ironmongers. Clitherow was also a member of the Ironmongers company. He was a prominent member of the East India Company as early as March 1601 and in 1604 was a member of the committee of the company. He was also active in efforts to discover the North West passage, being named in a grant of incorporation to promote expeditions in 1612. In 1618 he was Master of the Ironmongers Company. He was nominated unsuccessfully for the positions of Deputy Governor and Treasurer of the East India Company in 1619. In 1624 he was master of the Ironmongers Company again. He was elected an alderman for Aldersgate ward on 2 January 1625 and was chosen as a Sheriff of London and Middlesex in the same year. Also in 1625 he became Deputy Governor of the East India Company.

Clitherow transferred as alderman to the Billingsgate ward on 7 February 1627 and remained until his death. Around this time he was appointed member of a Commission formed to examine the accounts of moneys raised to repress pirates from Algiers and Tunis. In 1628, Clitherow was elected Member of Parliament for City of London and sat until 1629 when King Charles decided to rule without parliament for eleven years.

In 1635 Clitherow became Lord Mayor of London; a pageant by Thomas Heywood entitled Londini Sinus Salutis, or, Londons Harbour of Health, and Happinesse was performed on 29 October in his honour. He was knighted at Hampton Court on 15 January 1637. From 1636 to 1640 he was President of Christ's Hospital. He created two scholarships at Oxford University which bear his name.

From 1638 to his death he was Governor of the East India Company.

Clitherow died at the age of 63 and was buried in the church of St Andrew Undershaft.

Clitherow married twice. One wife was a daughter of Sir Thomas Cambell, Lord Mayor in 1609–10, and their daughter married Sir Thomas Trollope, 1st Baronet. Another daughter Rachel married Dr William Paule, Bishop of Oxford, and his son James purchased Boston Manor.

Parliament of England
Preceded by Sir Thomas Middleton; Heneage Finch; Sir Robert Bateman; Sir Maurice Abbot	Member of Parliament for City of London; 1628–1629; With: Thomas Moulson; Henry Waller; James Bunce	Parliament suspended until 1640
Civic offices
Preceded by Sir Robert Parkhurst	Lord Mayor of London; 1636–1637	Succeeded by Edward Bromfield
