= Thomas Freke =

Thomas Freke may refer to:

- Thomas Freke (died 1633) (1563–1633), member of parliament for Dorchester and Dorset
- Thomas Freke (died 1701) (1638–1701), member of parliament for Dorset
- Thomas Freke (1660–1721), member of parliament for Cricklade, Weymouth and Melcombe Regis and Lyme Regis
