= Maurice Abbot =

English merchant (1565–1642)

Sir Maurice Abbot
- Born: 1565
- Died: 1642 (aged 76–77)
- Occupations: Knight, Governor of the East India Company

Sir Maurice Abbot (1565–1642) was an English merchant, Governor of the East India Company (1624–1638), and a politician who sat in the House of Commons (1621–1626). He was Lord Mayor of London in 1638.

Abbot's whole career was a notable instance of well-directed energy and enterprise; it was one of the earliest examples of the creation of enormous wealth by the application of personal abilities to commerce through the development English foreign trade at the close of the sixteenth and opening of the seventeenth centuries.

== Biography ==
Abbot was the fifth and youngest son of Maurice Abbot, a cloth-worker of Guildford who died in 1606, and he was the brother of George Abbot (Archbishop of Canterbury) and of Robert Abbot (Bishop of Salisbury). He was baptised at Holy Trinity Church, Guildford on 2 November 1565, was educated at Royal Grammar School, Guildford and was probably apprenticed in London to his father's trade. Subsequently he became a freeman of the Drapers' Company, and rapidly amassed great wealth as a merchant dealing in various commodities such as cloth, indigo, spices and jewellery.

Abbot was one of the original directors of the East India Company, which was incorporated by royal charter in 1600, was among the earliest to invest large sums in its "stock", was a member of its special committee of direction from 1607 onwards, and was throughout his life foremost in defending its interests against its enemies at home and abroad. In 1608 he was appointed a representative of the company for the audit of the accounts of expenses incurred jointly with the Muscovy Company in "setting forth John Kingston for the discovery of the north-west passage".

He became a member of the committee of the Virginia Company in 1610, and its auditor from 1619 to 1620. In 1614, Abbot was one of the original Shareholders of the Somers Isles Company, which was formed by the shareholders of the Virginia Company to separately administer The Somers Isles (or Bermuda) (which the Virginia Company had been in de facto possession of since the 1612 wreck of the Sea Venture, and which its royal charter had been extended to include in 1612). Abbott's Bay in Pembroke, Bermuda, was named after him (but was renamed Clarence Cove in 1822, when the surrounding Admiralty House property, 'til then known as St. John's Hill, was renamed Clarence Hill in commemoration of Admiral of the Fleet, Prince William, the Duke of Clarence (later King William IV)). Abbott's Cliff in Hamilton Parish, Bermuda, may also be named for him.

Early in 1615 Abbot was one of the commissioners despatched to Holland to settle the disputes that were constantly arising between the Dutch East India Company and the East India Company as to their trading rights in the East Indies and their fishing rights in the north seas. But the conferences that followed, produced no satisfactory result. In May 1615 Abbot himself paid a visit to the East Indies, and on his return was chosen deputy-governor of the company, an annual office to which he was eight times in succession re-elected.

During subsequent years the disagreements with the Dutch increased in force, and in 1619 Abbot was one of those appointed to treat in London with commissioners from Holland as to the peaceful establishment of the two companies abroad. A treaty was signed (2 June), which secured two-thirds of the spice produce of the Molucca Islands, where the disputes had grown hottest, to the Dutch company, and the remaining third to the English. But this settlement was not a permanent one. In 1620 the Dutch infringed some regulations of the treaty, and Abbot in company with Sir Dudley Digges went on an embassy to Holland to set matters once again on a surer footing. The commissioners were at first well received (20 November 1620) by the Prince of Orange and the states-general; but the Dutch were unwilling to make any concessions, and pursued the negotiations, according to the English accounts, with too much duplicity to admit of any effectual arrangement.

In February 1621 Abbot returned to London, and in an audience granted him by James I he bitterly complained of the "base usage" to which he had been subjected. It was clearly impossible to diminish the active feelings of jealousy that existed between the English and Dutch residents in the East Indies, and Abbot shared the sentiment too heartily to enable him to improve the position of affairs. In 1624 matters became more critical. News reached England that Amboyna, one of the chief trading depots of the Moluccas, had been the scene of the murder of Gabriel Towerson and several other English traders by the Dutch. At the time Abbot was holding the office of governor of the company, to which he had been elected on 23 March 1624. Intense excitement prevailed throughout the country, and the greatest anxiety was evinced as to the steps that Abbot would take. He recognised at once the necessity of "pressing the matter modestly", in order to avoid open war with Holland; but in repeated audiences with James I and in petitions and speeches to the privy council he insisted that demand should be made of the Dutch authorities to bring the perpetrators of the outrage to justice. He spoke of withdrawing from the trade altogether if this measure was not adopted, and after much delay the Dutch agreed to give the desired reparation. But death of James I saw the promise unfulfilled, and Abbot's efforts to pursue the question further proved unavailing.

Abbot not only took a leading part in the affairs of the East India Company during these years, he was also an influential member of the Levant Company before 1607, and the English merchant service was, from the beginning of the seventeenth century, largely under his control. In 1614 one of his vessels, named the Tiger, was assaulted and taken by "M. Mintaine, a Frenchman of the Mauritius", and Abbot sought redress for the injury in vain. In 1616 he with others received a bounty for building six new ships. In 1612 he was nominated a director of a newly incorporated company "of merchants of London, discoverers of the north-west passage", and his statement that in 1614 he "brought to the mint 60 pounds weight of gold for Indian commodities exported" proves that his own commercial transactions continued for many years on a very large scale. He also expressed himself anxious a few years later to open up trade with Persia, and to wrest from the Portuguese East India Company the commercial predominance they had acquired there.

During the last twenty years of his life Abbot played a still more active part in public affairs. In 1621 he was elected member of parliament for Kingston-upon-Hull; shortly afterwards was nominated one of the commissioners for equipping merchant vessels to take part in a projected expedition against the pirates of Algiers, and he appears to have been consulted by the king's ministers in every stage of the preparations, which were for a long period under discussion.

On 17 November 1621 Abbot became a customs farmer, and in 1623 he was empowered to administer "oaths to such persons as should either desire to pass the seas from this kingdom or to enter it from abroad". A few months later he was engaged in personal negotiations with James I and George Villiers, 1st Duke of Buckingham for the remission of part of £20,000. claimed by them from the East India Company.

In 1624, when he was again returned to parliament for Kingston-upon-Hull, Abbot was appointed a member of the council for establishing the colony of Virginia. It was in the same year that he had been elected governor of the East India Company, an office that he was still holding in 1633, but which he resigned before 1638; and during the time that he sat in parliament he was continually called upon to speak in the company's behalf. On many occasions he complained of the obloquy heaped upon himself and his friends, because it was supposed that their extensive foreign trade deprived this country of the benefit of their wealth, and, with a discrimination far in advance of his age, denounced the "curiousness" of the English in forbidding the exportation of specie, and asserted the economic advantages to the state of the company's commerce.

On the accession of Charles I in 1625 Abbot was the first to receive the honour of knighthood from the new king, and he represented the City of London in the Useless Parliament (the earliest parliament of the reign), although his old constituency had tried hard to secure his services. He apparently supplied some of the jewellery required for Charles's coronation, and received on 5 July of the same year "£8,000 for a diamond cut in facets and set in a collet". On 15 December 1626 Abbot became Alderman of the ward of Bridge Without, and a few months later was chosen Sheriff of London.

In 1627 the customs department was reorganised, and Abbot with others received a lease of the customs on wines and currants for three and a half years, in consideration of a fine of £12,000 and a loan to the King of £20,000. But he was no servile agent of the crown. On 16 September 1628 information was sent to the king's council that Abbot was one of the merchants who refused to pay a newly imposed additional tax on the importation of currants, and that, while the quarrel was pending, he had broken into the government warehouse where currants belonging to him had been stored. But the supreme authorities do not appear to have pressed the charge against him.

In 1637 he was one of those entrusted by the lords of the admiralty with fitting out ships at the expense of the city of London in accordance with the ship-money edict of 1636, and the attorney-general and the recorder of London shortly afterwards exhibited an information against him in the exchequer court on the ground that he had not provided sufficient men and ammunition. By order of the king's council, however, the proceedings against Abbot were stayed, and the charge dropped. In 1642 the recorder of London, who took part in the matter in behalf of the crown, was impeached by the parliament for having advised Abbot and others to levy ship-money.

In 1638 Sir Maurice Abbot, who had on 13 September 1631 exchanged the ward of Bridge Without for that of Coleman Street, became Lord Mayor of London. The usual description of the pageant prepared to celebrate his introduction into office was from the pen of Thomas Heywood, the dramatist. Only one perfect copy of this rare work is now known, and it is in the Guildhall library. In a dedication to the new lord mayor, Heywood emphasises Abbot's popularity among his fellow-citizens, and refers to the extraordinarily successful careers of himself and his two brothers. "Neither can I omit the happinesse of your deceased father, remarkable in three most fortunate sonnes". In "the first show" described by Heywood he makes allusion to "the trading of the right honourable the present lord mayor, who is a merchant free of the Turkey, Italian, French, Muscovy, and was late governour of the East-Indy Company". In another "show" a shepherd was introduced to typify the cloth trade, in which Abbot was still engaged, and subsequently an actor in the pageant, in the character of an Indian, addressed laudatory verses to the new lord mayor as the chief merchant of England, "By whose commerce our nation hath been fam'd".

Abbot's mayoralty, which covered the greater part of the year 1639, was rendered somewhat eventful by the outbreak of war with the Scots (the Bishops War), and by the departure of an English army for the northern border under the king himself. On 7 March Abbot was constituted "the King's lieutenant within the city and suburbs of London" during his absence in the north,. and was given full authority to arm, if necessary, the inhabitants against the King's enemies, and at the discretion of himself and the aldermen to put in force martial law. In the following months he was frequently admonished by the king's council to keep a strict watch over the manufacturers of shot and other warlike implements, and ordered to make arrests of suspected persons. At times his energy in this direction seems to have been excessive. On 28 May he sent to the Poultry Counter a woman suspected to have distributed during the Whitsuntide holidays a pamphlet by John Lilburne, the famous agitator; but the House of Lords in the following year reversed Abbot's decision. He also regularly collected ship-money. On the termination of his year of office Abbot practically retired from public life. He died 10 January 1642, and was buried in St Stephen, Coleman Street, London.

There is no certain record of the situation of Abbot's house in London, but his name occurs among those who in 1630 held "tenements from the great south door (of St. Paul's Cathedral) to the south-west corner of the cloister wall", and he was one of the commissioners nominated in 1631 for the repair of the cathedral.

In 1633 Robert Ashley dedicated his translation of an Italian work on Cochin China to Abbot, and attributes to him the assertion that "the remotest traffique is always the most beneficiall to the publick stocke, and the trade to East Indies doth farre excell all other".

== Family ==
Abbot married, firstly, Joan, daughter of George Austen, of Shalford, near Guildford, by whom he had five children.

- Morris, one of his sons, was called to the bar as a member of the Inner Temple, and was one of the executors of the will of his uncle, the archbishop, who left him several legacies.
- George (1602–1645), became a probationer fellow of Merton College, Oxford, in 1622, and was admitted bachelor of civil law in 1630. He carried the great banner at the funeral of his uncle, the Archbishop of Canterbury, in 1633, and sat in the Long Parliament as M.P. for Guildford until his death in 1645.
- Edward, was, it appears from petitions to the House of Lords in 1641, in continual pecuniary difficulties.

After the death of his first wife in 1597, Abbot married, for the second time, Margaret, daughter of Bartholomew Barnes, an alderman of London, and she died on 5 September 1630.

1635 Abbot erected an elaborate monument in Holy Trinity Church, Guildford, to the memory of his brother, the Archbishop of Canterbury, who had died two years previously, and had appointed Abbot an executor under his will.

== Notes ==
Parliament of England
Preceded by Sir John Bourchier; Richard Burgis	Member of Parliament for Kingston upon Hull; 1621–1622; With: John Lister	Succeeded by John Lister; Sir John Suckling
Preceded by John Lister; Sir John Suckling	Member of Parliament for Kingston upon Hull; 1624–1625; With: John Lister	Succeeded by John Lister; Lancelot Roper
Preceded by Sir Thomas Middleton; Heneage Finch; Robert Bateman; Martin Bond	Member of Parliament for City of London; 1626; With: Sir Thomas Middleton; Heneage Finch; Sir Robert Bateman	Succeeded by Thomas Moulson; Christopher Clitherow; Henry Waller; James Bunce
Civic offices
Preceded by Sir Edward Bromfield	Lord Mayor of London; 1638	Succeeded by Sir Henry Garraway
