= William Pitt (courtier) =

English courtier and politician (1559–1636)

Arms of Pitt: Sable, a fesse chequy argent and azure between three bezants, arms granted to Sir William Pitt's father and re-granted to himself in 1604 by William Camden

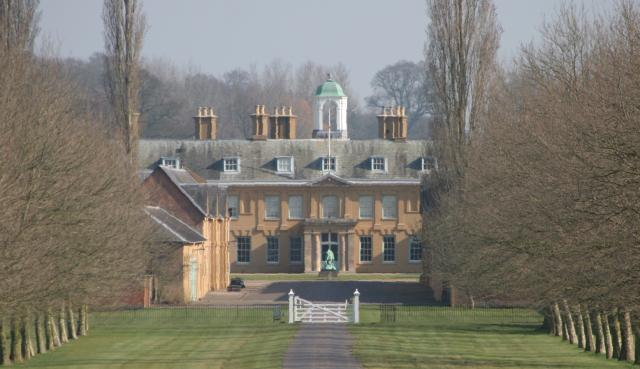
Stratfield Saye House, Hampshire

Sir William Pitt (1559 – 29 May 1636) of Old Palace Yard, Westminster, and of Hartley Wespall and Stratfield Saye, both in Hampshire, and of Iwerne Stepleton in Dorset, was an English courtier and politician who sat in the House of Commons between 1614 and 1625.

== Origins ==
Pitt was the eldest son of John Pitt (died 1602), Clerk of the Exchequer to Queen Elizabeth I and a mercer from Blandford Forum in Dorset, by his wife Joan Swayne, a daughter of John Swayne. John Pitt (died 1602) received a grant of arms and according to the heraldic commentator Mark Antony Lower (1845): "The family of Pitt, Earl of Chatham, bore 'Sable, a fesse chequy argent and azure between three bezants (or pieces of money)', in allusion to the office the original grantee held in the Exchequer. The Fanshawes also bore chequy, &c., for the same reason." In mediaeval times the business of the Exchequer was performed on a table covered by a large chequered cloth on which sums of money received were placed and moved around in a primitive form of financial accounting. William Pitt's younger brother was Thomas Pitt of Blandford, from whom the Pitts of Boconnoc were descended, namely his grandson Thomas Pitt (1653–1726), President of Madras, a wealthy merchant who purchased Boconnoc, and his grandson William Pitt, 1st Earl of Chatham (1708–1778) ("Pitt the Elder"), twice Prime Minister of Great Britain, the father of William Pitt the Younger (1759–1806), also Prime Minister.

== Career ==
He became comptroller of the household and a principal officer of the exchequer in the reign of James I. He acquired the manor of Stratfield Turgis from the Marquis of Winchester in the reign of James I and also acquired property at Stratfield Saye in Hampshire.

In 1614, Pitt was elected a member of parliament for Wareham. He was knighted at Theobalds on 2 February 1619. In 1621, he was re-elected MP for Wareham. In 1624 he intended that his son Edward Pitt should be his fellow member at Wareham but the mayor opposed this and Edward was returned for Poole instead. Pitt was re-elected MP for Wareham in 1625. In about 1630 he enlarged his property at Stratfield Saye House.

== Marriage and children ==
Pitt married Edith Cadbury, a daughter and co-heiress of Nicholas Cadbury, Yeoman, of Arne, near Wareham in Dorset. The surviving silver plate of St Mary's Church, Iwerne Stepleton, includes a cover-paten with hall-mark of 1638, engraved with arms of Pitt impaling Cadbury. By his wife he had children including:

- Edward Pitt (d.1643), MP, eldest son and heir, who inherited Stratfield Saye House.
- William Pitt of Hartley Wespall, younger son.

== Death and burial ==
Pitt died at the age of about 76 at Stratfield Saye and had an imposing monument erected in the parish church by his son Edward.

Parliament of England
| Preceded by Robert Napier; Dr Francis James | Member of Parliament for Wareham; 1614–1625; With: John Freke 1614; John Trenchard 1621–1625 | Succeeded by Sir Nathaniel Napier; Edward Laurence |
