= John Freke (MP) =

English politician

John Freke (c. 1591 – 28 November 1641) was an English politician who sat in the House of Commons between 1614 and 1624.

Freke was the son of Sir Thomas Freke of Iwerne Courtney, Dorset and Elizabeth Taylor. He studied at Hart Hall, Oxford on 31 October 1605, aged 14. He then studied law at the Middle Temple in 1610.

In 1614, he was elected Member of Parliament for Wareham. In 1621 he was elected MP for Weymouth and Melcombe Regis. He was re-elected MP for Weymouth in 1624.

He purchased Cerne Abbey from the Crown in 1625 and was knighted in 1631. He was appointed High Sheriff of Dorset for January to October, 1636.

He married twice: firstly Arundell, the daughter of Sir George Trenchard of Wolveton, Charminster, Dorset, with whom he had a son, who predeceased him and a daughter, and secondly Jane, the daughter and coheiress of Sir John Shurley of Isfield, Sussex and widow of Sir Walter Covert of Slaugham, Sussex with whom he had 2 sons and 2 daughters. His youngest son, Thomas was also an MP. His other surviving son George made a very advantageous marriage to Lady Abigail Digby, daughter of John Digby, 1st Earl of Bristol. His widow remarried the leading statesman Denzil Holles, 1st Baron Holles. She died in 1666.

Parliament of England
Preceded by Robert Napier; Dr Francis James	Member of Parliament for Wareham; 1614; With: William Pitt	Succeeded by William Pitt; John Trenchard
Preceded by Sir Charles Caesar; Robert Bateman; Bernard Michell; John Roy	Member of Parliament for Weymouth and Melcombe Regis; 1621–1625; With: Matthew Pitt 1621–1624; Giles Green 1621–1622; Christopher Erle 1621–1622; Arthur Pyne 1624–1625; Sir Thomas Myddelton 1624–1625; Thomas Giear 1624–1625	Succeeded by Arthur Pyne; Giles Green; Sir John Strangways; Bernard Michell
