= Thomas Myddelton (Lord Mayor of London) =

English merchant, politician and Lord Mayor of London

Sir Thomas Myddelton

Member of Parliament for London
- In office 1624–1628 Serving with Sir Heneage Finch, Robert Bateman, Martin Bond, Sir Maurice Abbot
- Preceded by: Sir Thomas Lowe; Robert Heath; Robert Bateman; William Towerson
- Succeeded by: Thomas Moulson; Christopher Clitherow; Henry Waller; James Bunce

Lord Mayor of London
- In office 1613–1613
- Preceded by: Sir John Swynnerton
- Succeeded by: Thomas Hayes

Personal details
- Born: 1550
- Died: 12 August 1631 (aged 80–81)
- Spouses: Hester Saltonstall (m. 1584; died 1586) Elizabeth Olmstead (m. 1588, died) Elizabeth Brooke Thorpe Hobart (m. 1604; died 1619) Anna Vanaker Wittewronge (after 1619)
- Relations: Sir Hugh Myddelton, 1st Baronet (brother); Robert Myddelton (brother); Sir Thomas Myddelton, 1st Baronet (grandson); Sir Thomas Salusbury, 2nd Baronet (grandson)
- Children: 6, including Thomas Myddelton
- Parent(s): Richard Myddelton; Jane Dryhurst

Sir Thomas Myddelton (1550 – 12 August 1631) was a Welsh merchant who was Lord Mayor of London before becoming a Member of Parliament for London.

== Early life ==
He was the fourth son of Richard Myddelton, Governor of Denbigh Castle, and Jane Dryhurst. Among his siblings were William Myddelton, a poet and seaman, Sir Hugh Myddelton, 1st Baronet, a merchant and clothmaker, and Robert Myddelton, MP for Weymouth and Melcombe Regis and the City of London.

== Career ==
As a youth, he was apprenticed to a grocer in London, and made his fortune in trade. He divided his time between London and Wales, and purchased Chirk Castle in 1595 for £5,000.

He was a member of the Grocers' Company, a Member of Parliament for the City of London and a founding member of the East India Company, Sheriff of London in 1604 and Lord Mayor of London in 1613. His brother, Sir Hugh Myddleton, was instrumental in the creation of the New River which supplied London with fresh water from 1613. He was knighted in July 1603.

Along with Rowland Heylyn, Myddelton financed the publication of a Welsh language Bible suitable for everyday use.

== Personal life ==
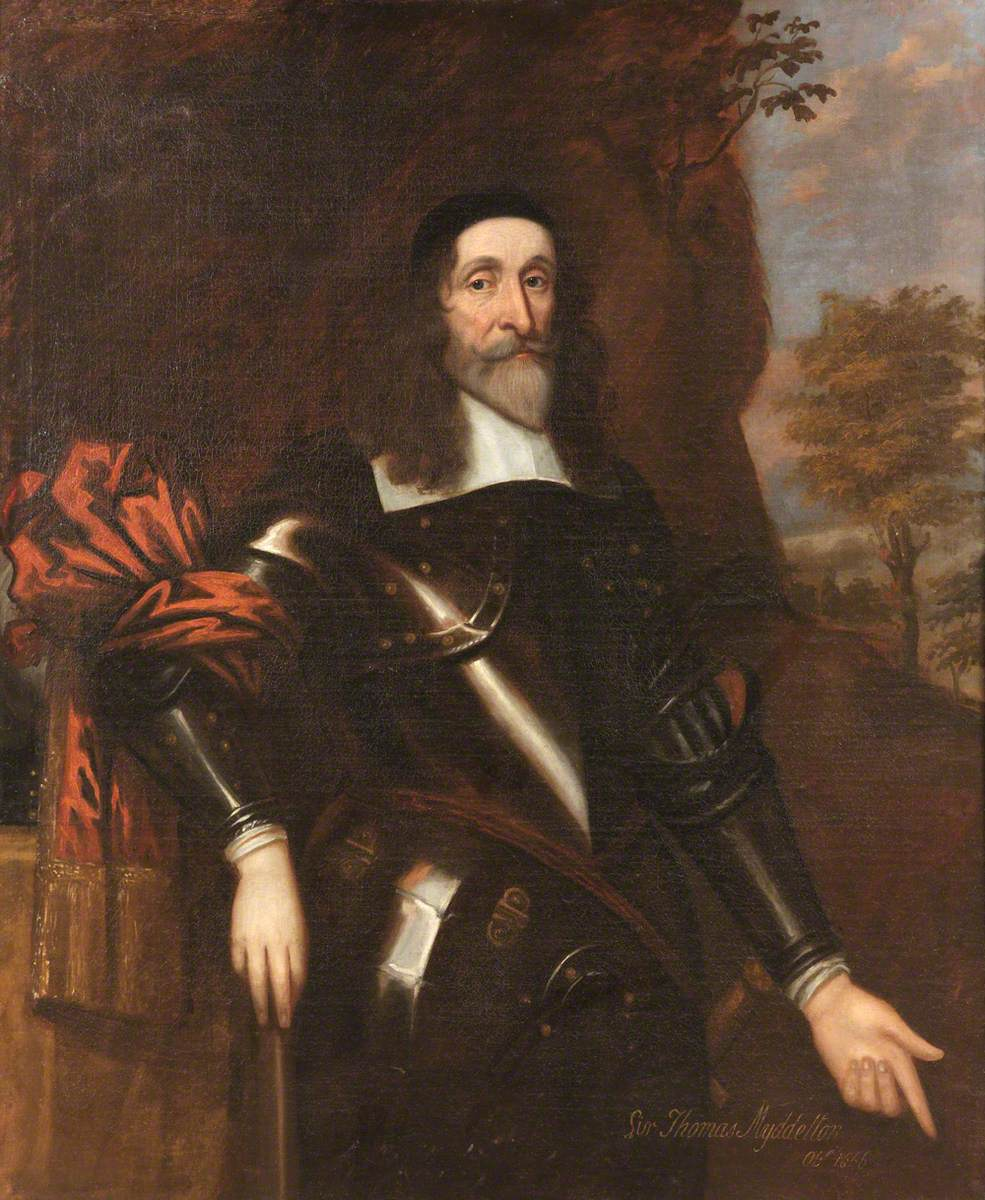
Portrait of his eldest surviving son Sir Thomas Myddelton of Chirk Castle, c. 1650

Myddelton was married four times. His first marriage was on 18 February 1584 to Hester Saltonstall (1555–1587), a daughter of Sir Richard Saltonstall, also a Lord Mayor of London who served as MP for London and as Sheriff of the City of London. Her sister, Eleanor Saltonstall, married Myddelton's brother Robert, in 1612. Before her death in July 1587, they were the parents of two sons:

- Thomas Myddelton of Chirk Castle (c. 1586–1666), who married twice: first to Margaret Savile, daughter of George Savile of Wakefield in Yorkshire, and secondly to Mary Napier, a daughter of Sir Robert Napier, 1st Baronet, of Luton Hoo, Bedfordshire, with whom he had seven sons and six daughters.
- Richard Myddelton (1586–c. 1607), who married Katherine Herne, widow of Henry Herne, in 1604.

After her death, he married Elizabeth Olmstead, widow of John Olmstead of Ingatestone, Essex, by 25 March 1588. They were the parents of two sons and two daughters:

- Henry Myddelton, who died young.
- Timothy Myddelton (c. 1590–1655), who inherited his estates in Essex; he married Martha Johnson, a daughter of Robert Johnson, alderman of London.
- Hester Myddelton (d. 1614), who married Sir Henry Salusbury, 1st Baronet, the grandson of Catherine of Berain and a cousin of Elizabeth I.
- Mary Myddelton (d. c. 1681), who married Sir John Maynard, the second son of Sir Henry Maynard, of Estaines Parva.

His third marriage was in 1604 to Elizabeth (née Brooke) Thorpe Hobart (d. 1619/20), a daughter of Richard Brooke, a goldsmith of London. She was twice a widow, having been married to Richard Thorpe (d. 1591), a vintner of London and Miles Hobart (d. 1604), a clothworker of London. By his third marriage he gained a stepson, Miles Hobart. She died in 1619.

His fourth marriage was to Anna (née Vanaker) Wittewronge, a daughter of Garrard Vanaker of Antwerp, widow of Jacob Wittewronge, a brewer of London. By his fourth marriage, he gained another stepson, John Wittewrong,

Myddelton died on 12 August 1631. His younger son, Timothy, inherited his estates in Essex.

=== Descendants ===
Through his eldest son Thomas, he was a grandfather of Sir Thomas Myddelton, 1st Baronet, who was created a baronet in 1660, and Ann Myddelton, wife of Edward Herbert, 3rd Baron Herbert of Chirbury.

Through his daughter Hester, he was a grandfather of Sir Thomas Salusbury, 2nd Baronet, MP for Denbighshire in the Short Parliament and served on Charles I’s council of war at the Battle of Edgehill.

Parliament of England
Preceded by Sir Thomas Lowe; Robert Heath; Robert Bateman; William Towerson	Member of Parliament for London; 1624–1628; With: Sir Heneage Finch 1624–28; Robert Bateman 1624–28; Martin Bond 1624–26; Sir Maurice Abbot 1626–28	Succeeded by Thomas Moulson; Christopher Clitherow; Henry Waller; James Bunce
Civic offices
Preceded by Sir John Swynnerton	Lord Mayor of the City of London; 1613	Succeeded by Thomas Hayes
