= Charles Caesar (disambiguation) =

Charles Caesar may refer to:

- Sir Charles Caesar (1590–1642), English judge, Master of the Rolls
- Sir Charles Caesar (1653–1694), English Member of Parliament (MP) for Hertford and Hertfordshire (UK Parliament constituency)
- Charles Caesar (Treasurer of the Navy) (1673–1741), English Tory MP, Treasurer of the Navy 1711–1714
