= Thomas Lowe (Lord Mayor) =

English politician

Sir Thomas Lowe (died 11 April 1623) was an English politician who sat in the House of Commons at various times between 1606 and 1622. He was an alderman of the City of London and became Lord Mayor of London in 1604.

== History and career ==
Lowe was the son of Simon Lowe of Bromley Kent and his wife Margaret Lacey, daughter of Christopher Lacey of London. He was a member of the Worshipful Company of Haberdashers. In 1594 he was Master of the Haberdashers Company and became an alderman of Billingsgate in 1594. He was Sheriff of the City of London in 1595. In 1602 he was Master of the Haberdashers again and was knighted at Whitehall on 26 July 1603. He became Lord Mayor of London in 1604. He was Master of the Haberdashers again in 1604 and became a governor of the Levant Company in 1605 until his death in 1623.

In 1606, Lowe was elected Member of Parliament for City of London until 1611 He was Master of the Haberdashers again in 1608 and in 1609 became alderman of Broad Street Ward instead of Billingsgate. He became President of St Bartholomew's Hospital in 1610 and held the position until his death. He was Master of the Haberdashers again in 1612 and was re-elected MP for the City of London in 1614 for the Addled Parliament. In 1615 he was Master of the Haberdashers again and in 1616 became Colonel of the East Regiment Trained Bands until his death. He was for the last time Master of the Haberdashers from 1618 to 1619, and in 1621 was re-elected MP for the City of London.

== Personal life ==
Lowe married Ann Coulston, daughter of Gabriel Coulston of London.

Parliament of England
Preceded by Nicholas Fuller; Sir Henry Montague; Sir Henry Billingsley; Richard Gore	Member of Parliament for City of London; 1606–1622; With: Richard Gore 1606–1611; Nicholas Fuller 1606–1614; Sir Henry Montague 1606–1614; Robert Myddelton 1614–1616; William Towerson 1621–1622; Robert Heath 1621–1622; Robert Bateman from 1621	Succeeded by Sir Thomas Middleton; Heneage Finch; Robert Bateman; Martin Bond
Civic offices
Preceded by Sir Thomas Bennett	Lord Mayor of the City of London; 1604	Succeeded by Sir Leonard Holliday
