= Edward Hungerford (died 1648) =

English politician (1596–1648)

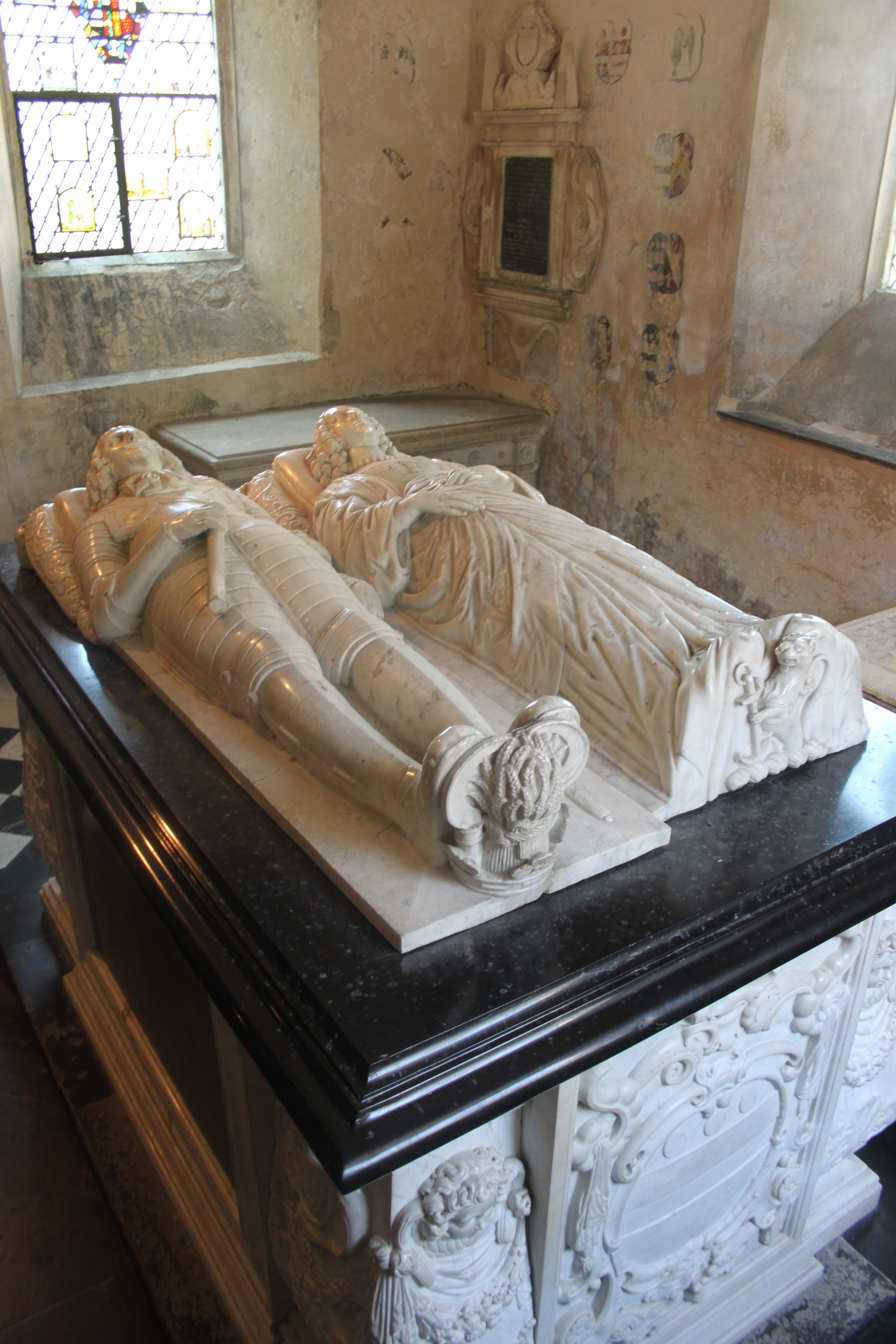
Monument to Sir Edward Hungerford (1596–1648) and his wife, St Leonard's Chapel, Farleigh Hungerford Castle. At his feet are shown the heraldic badges of Hungerford sickles and Peverell garb.

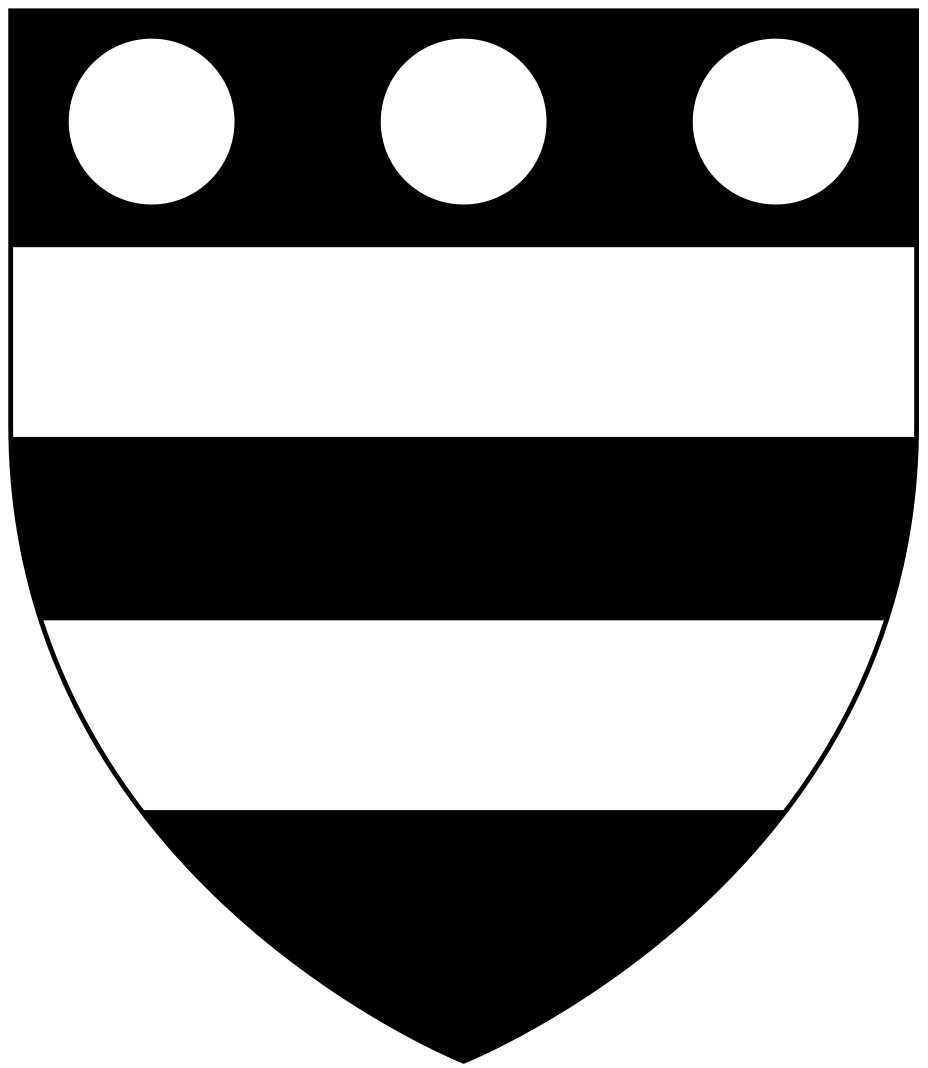
Arms of Hungerford: Sable, two bars argent in chief three plates

Sir Edward Hungerford (1596–1648) of Corsham, Wiltshire and of Farleigh Castle in Wiltshire (now Somerset), Member of Parliament, was a landowner and a Parliamentarian commander during the English Civil War. He occupied and plundered Salisbury in 1643, and took Wardour and Farleigh castles.

== Origins and education ==
Hungerford was the eldest son of Sir Anthony Hungerford (1564–1627) of Stock, Wiltshire and Black Bourton, Oxfordshire by his first wife Lucy Hungerford, a daughter of Sir Walter Hungerford (died c. 1596) of Farleigh Castle.

He was educated at Queen's College, Oxford from the age of 12, and admitted to the Middle Temple in 1613.

== Career ==
In 1614 he was elected Member of Parliament for Wootton Bassett in the Addled Parliament. He was elected as M.P. for Chippenham in 1621 and for Wiltshire in 1624. He was a Deputy Lieutenant for Wiltshire from 1624 to 1643. In 1625 he was created a Knight of the Bath. He was elected MP for Cricklade in 1628 and sat until 1629 when King Charles I decided to rule without parliament for eleven years. He was Sheriff of Wiltshire in 1631.

In April 1640, Hungerford was elected MP for Chippenham in the Short Parliament. He was re-elected MP for Chippenham for the Long Parliament in November 1640. At the outbreak of the English Civil War he took the side of Parliament, and on 11 July 1642 was sent to execute the militia ordinance in Wiltshire. He was excluded from pardon in the king's declaration of grace to the inhabitants of Wiltshire of 2 November 1642, and having been put in command of the Wiltshire forces, made Devizes his headquarters.

In December 1642 he attacked Lord Cottington at Fonthill, threatening to bring his troops into Fonthill House, where Lord Cottington lay sick, unless he paid £1,000 to Parliament. Against such treatment Lord Cottington appealed to Parliament, and the Speaker desired Sir Edward to desist.

In January 1643 Hungerford had a violent quarrel with Sir Edward Baynton, the parliamentarian governor of Malmesbury, each accusing the other of intended treachery. In February 1643 he occupied and plundered the city of Salisbury, but finding himself unsupported by the county, evacuated Devizes and retired to the city of Bath. When Waller recaptured Malmesbury for Parliament (22 March 1643) he appointed Hungerford governor, but while Hungerford was still at Bath seeking supplies, Malmesbury was abandoned by the officer whom he had nominated to represent him. Hungerford published a 'Vindication' of his conduct, dated at Bath 28 April 1643 (published at London, 6 May 1643).

After taking part with Sir William Waller in the Battle of Lansdowne and Battle of Roundway Down, Hungerford besieged Lady Arundel in Wardour Castle, Wiltshire (2–8 May 1643). He treated the lady with little grace, carrying her with scant ceremony to Hatch and thence to Shaftesbury, and keeping her all the while "without a bed to lie on".

Subsequently, Hungerford attacked Farleigh Castle, which was garrisoned for the king and under the command of Colonel John Hungerford, said to have been Sir Edward's half-brother. The castle surrendered to Sir Edward in September 1645. He had a reversionary right to the property under the will of Sir Edward Hungerford (died 1607), his maternal uncle, but the testator's widow had a life-interest, and remained there until 1653.

== Marriage ==
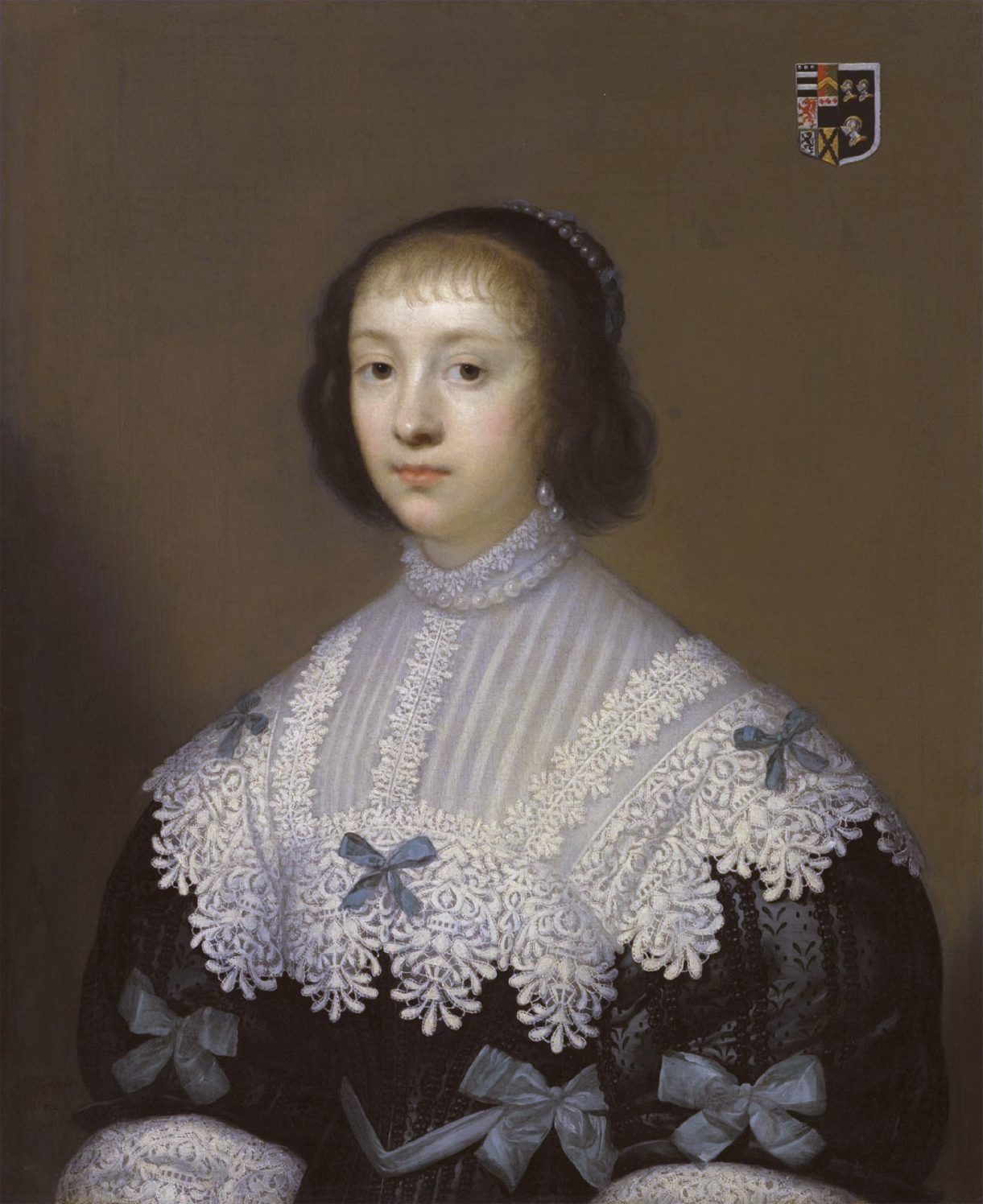
Margaret Holliday, 1633 portrait by Cornelis Jonson van Ceulen

In 1620 he married Margaret Holliday, a daughter and coheiress of William Holliday, an Alderman of the City of London. She was the sister of Anne Holliday, wife of Sir Henry Mildmay of Wanstead, Essex, Master of the Jewel Office from 1620 to 1649.

The marriage was childless. She survived him until July 1672, when she was also buried at Farleigh. After her husband's death, she financed the building of the Hungerford Almshouses (with chapel and schoolroom) at Corsham, Wiltshire.

== Death and burial ==
Hungerford died in 1648 and was buried in St Anne's Chapel, the north transept chapel of St Leonard's Chapel within the walls of Farleigh Castle. His magnificent tomb chest, with effigies of himself and his wife, survives.

== Succession ==
His will was proved on 26 October 1648. In 1653 his widow Margaret petitioned the Council of State to pay her £500, a small part of the sum borrowed from her husband by Parliament. Parliament had ordered repayment in 1649. Oliver Cromwell appears to have interested himself in her case. Sir Edward's reversionary interest in the Farleigh estates passed to his royalist brother Col. Anthony Hungerford (d. 1657).

== Notes ==
Parliament of England
Preceded by Henry Martin; Alexander Tutt	Member of Parliament for Wootton Bassett; 1614; With: Sir William Willoughby	Succeeded by Richard Harrison; John Wrenham
Preceded by William Maynard; Thomas Colepeper	Member of Parliament for Chippenham; 1621–1622; With: John Baily	Succeeded by Sir John Maynard; Charles Maynard
Preceded by Sir Francis Seymour; Sir Edward Bayntun	Member of Parliament for Wiltshire; 1624; With: Sir John St John	Succeeded by Sir Francis Seymour; Sir Henry Ley
Preceded by Sir George Hungerford; George Ernle	Member of Parliament for Cricklade; 1628–1629; With: Robert Jenner	Parliament suspended until 1640
Vacant Parliament suspended since 1629	Member of Parliament for Chippenham; 1640–1648; With: Sir Edward Bayntun	Succeeded by Sir Edward Bayntun; William Eyre
