= Christopher Erle =

English lawyer and politician

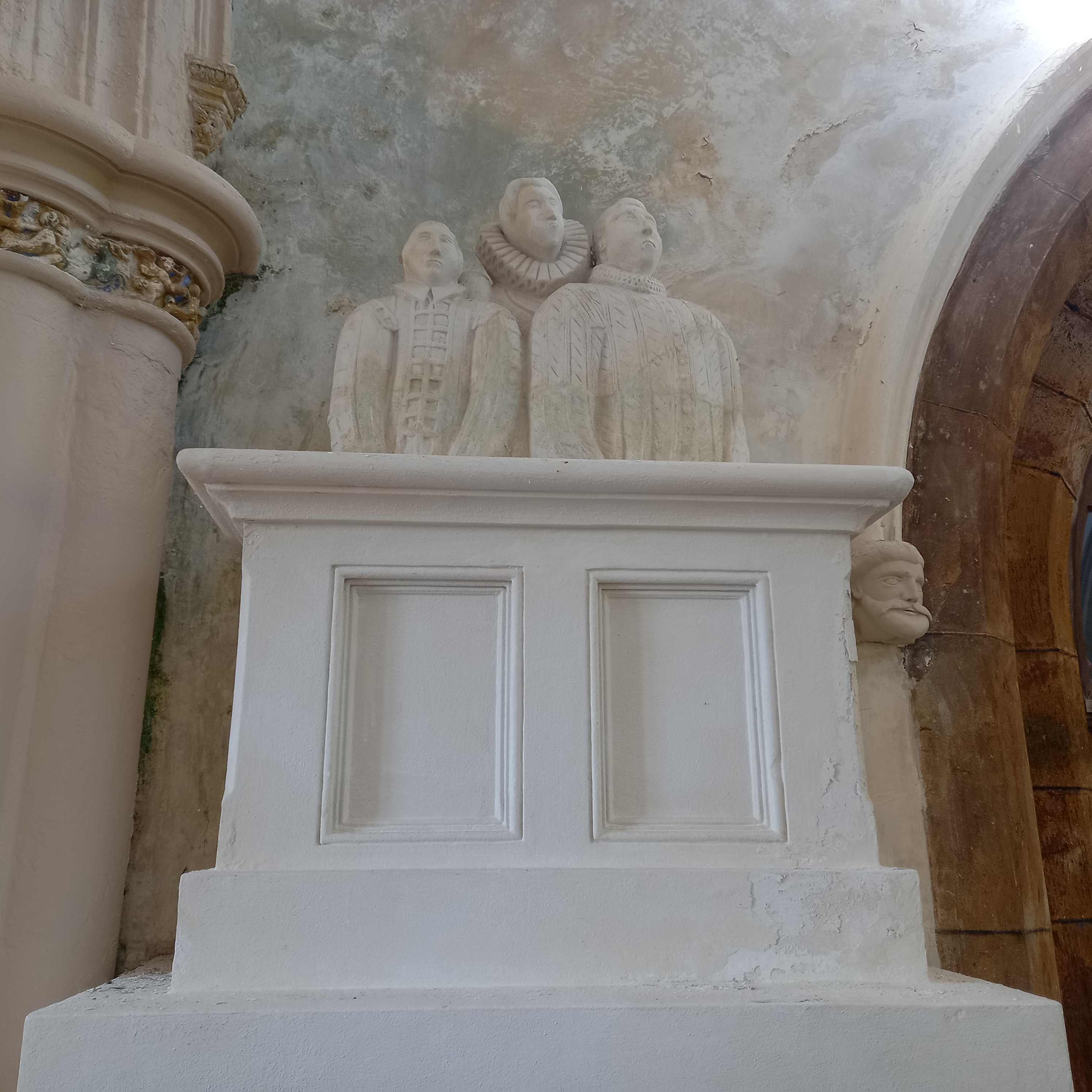
The three surviving children of Thomas Erle in 1597, Walter, Christopher (left) and Elizabeth, depicted at St Mary's Church, Morden, Dorset.

Christopher Erle (c. 1590 – 1634) was an English lawyer and politician who sat in the House of Commons at various times between 1621 and 1629.

Erle was born at Sturminster Marshall, the son of Thomas Erle (c.1550-1597) of Charborough House in Dorset and his wife Dorothy Pole, daughter of William Pole of Cullompton, Devon. He matriculated at Christ Church, Oxford on 10 June 1608, aged 18. He was called to the bar at Middle Temple in 1617. Erle and his brother Sir Walter Erle were issued shares in the Virginia Company in 1620.

In 1621, Erle was elected Member of Parliament for Weymouth and Melcombe Regis. He shared puritan ideals with Rev. John White in Dorchester and with his brother Walter invested in the Dorchester Company. He was elected MP for Poole in 1626. In 1628 he was elected MP for Lyme Regis and sat until 1629 when King Charles decided to rule without parliament for eleven years.

Erle died at the age of about 44 and was buried in the middle aisle of the Temple Church on 4 April 1634.

Erle married Elizabeth Denny, daughter of Edward Denny of Stortford on 26 April 1623 at Birchanger in Essex. Their son Christopher born in 1624 was MP for Essex in 1653.

Parliament of England
Preceded by Sir Charles Caesar; Robert Bateman; Bernard Michell; John Roy	Member of Parliament for Weymouth and Melcombe Regis; 1621–1622; With: John Freke; Giles Green; Matthew Pitt	Succeeded by Arthur Pyne; Matthew Pitt; Thomas Giear; John Freke
Preceded by John Pyne; Sir John Cooper	Member of Parliament for Poole; 1626; With: John Pyne	Succeeded by John Pyne; Sir John Cooper
Preceded by Sir Walter Erle; Thomas Paramour	Member of Parliament for Lyme Regis; 1628–1629; With: Thomas Paramour	Parliament suspended until 1640
