= Richard Venn =

English merchant and Lord Mayor of London

Sir Richard Venn or Fenn (died 18 August 1639) was an English merchant who was Lord Mayor of London in 1637.

== Life ==
Venn was a City of London merchant and a member of the Worshipful Company of Haberdashers. He was a member of the committee of the East India Company from 1619 to 1626 and Master of the Haberdashers Company from 1625 to 1626. On 4 May 1626, he was elected an alderman of the City of London for Castle Baynard ward and was Sheriff of London from 1626 to 1627. He was a member of the committee of the East India Company from 1627 to 1629 and from 1631 to 1637. In 1631 he became Colonel of the Trained Bands until his death, and was president of the Honourable Artillery Company from 1633 to 1634. He was elected alderman for Tower ward in 1634. In 1637, he was elected Lord Mayor of London and was again Master of the Haberdashers Company. He was knighted on 27 May 1638. He was a member of the committee of the East India Company again in 1639 until his death that year.

Venn married a daughter of James Collymore who was an alderman in 1610.

Civic offices
Preceded by Sir Edward Bromfield	Lord Mayor of the City of London; 1637	Succeeded by Sir Maurice Abbot
