= Matthew Pitt =

English merchant and politician (1576–1624)

Matthew Pitt (bap. 1 September 1576 – 18 April 1624) was an English merchant and politician who sat in the House of Commons from 1621 to 1622, and again in 1624.

Pitt was the son of Richard Pitt of Cricket Malherbie, Somerset. He became a merchant of Weymouth. He was chief magistrate of the town in 1610 and in 1619. In 1621, he was elected Member of Parliament for Weymouth and Melcombe Regis. He was an alderman of Melcombe Regis in 1623. He was again elected to represent Weymouth and Melcombe Regis in 1624, but died on 18 April 1624.

Pitt married firstly Christian Barnard, daughter of John Barnard of Shepton Mallet. He married secondly Philippa, daughter and coheir of John Daniel of Beaminster, Dorset. His sister Amy married James Strode of Shepton Mallet. His eldest daughter Elizabeth married Francis Crossing before her father's death.

Parliament of England
Preceded by Sir Charles Caesar; Robert Bateman; Barnard Michell; John Roy	Member of Parliament for Weymouth and Melcombe Regis; 1621–1624; With: John Freke; Giles Green; Christopher Erle	Succeeded by Arthur Pyne; Sir Thomas Myddelton; Thomas Giear; John Freke
