= William Holliday (merchant) =

Note : dates are given using the New Style calendar.

Arms of William Holliday, granted in 1624: Sable, three helmets argent a bordure of the last

William Holliday (aliter "Hollidaie", "Halliday", etc) (c. 1565 – February 14, 1624) was a wealthy London merchant and chairman of the East India Company.

== Origins ==
He was apparently born in Gloucestershire. It is not clear who his parents were: Burke's Commoners makes him out to be the son of Lawrence and Jane Pury of Gloucester, but the children listed in Lawrence's will (1587) and the brother and sister named in William's will (1623) do not have the same names, so they appear to be different families. Nevertheless, according to William's will, he was a cousin of Sir Leonard Holliday, who was later Lord Mayor of London.

== Career ==
William was later sent to London, probably in the 1580s, where he served an apprenticeship in the Worshipful Company of Mercers, which controlled the city's textile industry. In 1594 he took part in the Duke of Cumberland's expedition to the Azores which involved the sinking of the great Portuguese carrack the Cinco Chagas. William evidently had a successful career as a mercer. He was also involved in the East India Company, of which his cousin Sir Leonard had been a founder, and was elected as a 'committee', i.e. director, in 1616. In 1617 he served as Master of the Mercers Company and was elected a sheriff for the year . In February 1618, he was elected an alderman of the City. William's stature and success were reflected in the arranged marriages of his two daughters. In April 1619, after "long and earnest solicitation" by the Marquess (later Duke) of Buckingham, who was acting on instructions from King James, he married off Anne to Sir Henry Mildmay. In 1621, William was elected governor of the East India Company, a position he held for the remaining three years of his life.

== Marriage and children ==
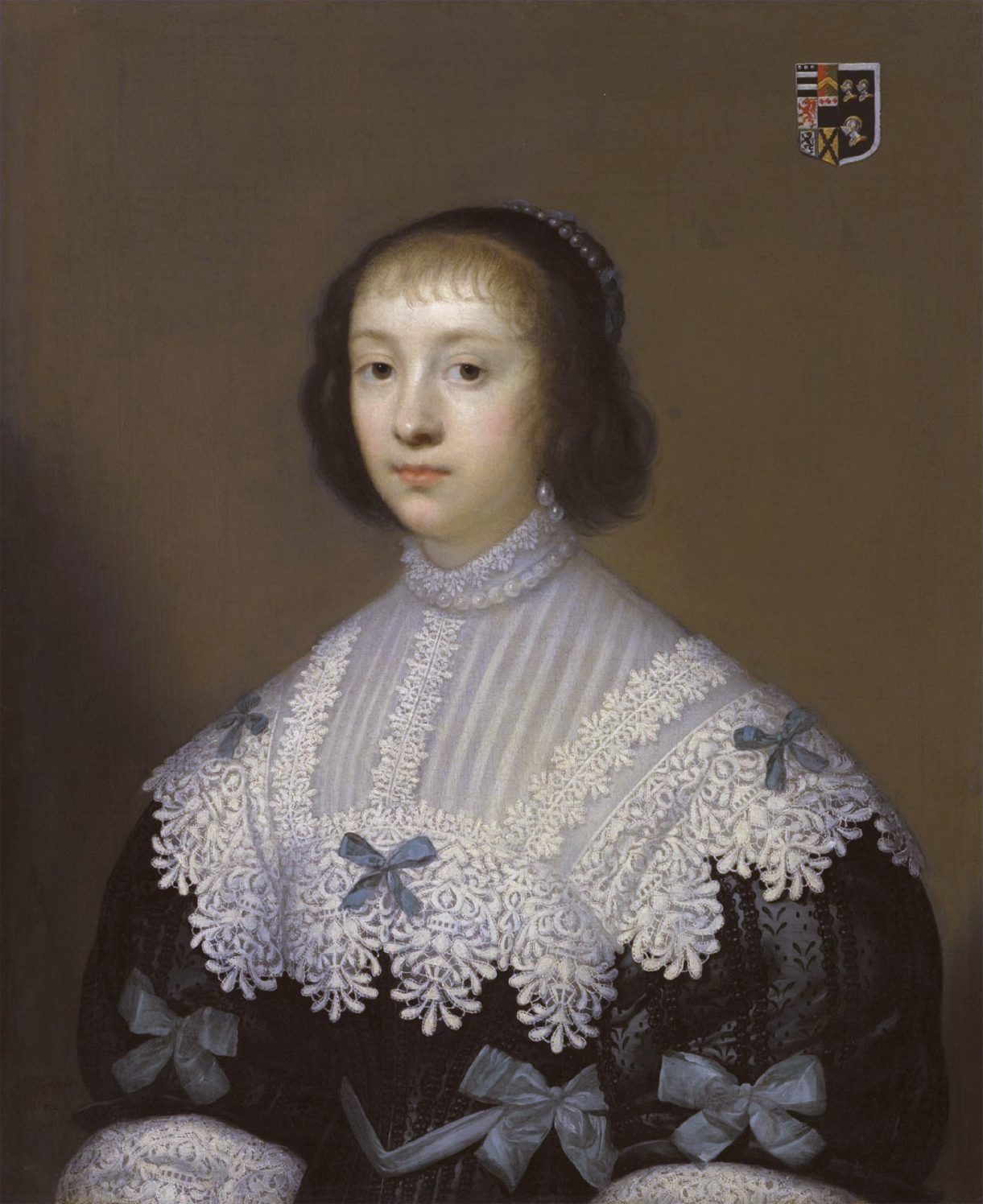
Margaret Holliday, daughter of William Holliday and wife of Sir Edward Hungerford (1596–1648) of Farleigh Hungerford Castle. 1633 portrait by Cornelis Jonson van Ceulen. The arms of Holliday are visible on the sinister side of the impaled escutcheon

In about 1600 he married Susan Rowe (d.1646), a daughter of Henry Rowe, a prominent member of the Worshipful Company of Ironmongers and later Lord Mayor of London, whose father Sir Thomas Rowe had also been Lord Mayor. She survived William and remarried (as his second wife) Robert Rich, 2nd Earl of Warwick (1587-1658). By Susan Rowe he had two daughters:

- Anne Holliday (born in 1602), wife of Sir Henry Mildmay of Wanstead, Essex, Master of the Jewel Office from 1620 to 1649.
- Margaret Holliday (born circa 1603), younger daughter, who in February 1620 married Sir Edward Hungerford (1596–1648) of Farleigh Hungerford Castle, Wiltshire, in the chapel of which survives the couple's magnificent chest tomb with effigies.

== Death and burial ==
William died on 14 February 1624 and was buried in or near St Lawrence Jewry church. He left a substantial estate: around £40 000 in cash, and properties in London, Middlesex, and Gloucestershire. Many years later, their daughter Margaret Hungerford erected a monument to William, Susanna, and her sister Anne, in St Lawrence Jewry church. It was irreparably damaged during an air raid in 1940.

== Coat of arms ==
Shortly before his death in 1624, William obtained a grant of arms from the College of Arms. The arms were: Sable, three helmets argent a bordure of the last, i.e. a black shield displaying three silver helmets all within a silver border. The crest was a demi-lion guardant holding an anchor. This crest serves as the footrest of the effigy of Margaret Hungerford at Farleigh Castle. These arms bear close resemblance to those granted in 1605 to his cousin Sir Leonard Holliday, Lord Mayor of London in 1605: Sable, three close helmets argent garnished or within a bordure engrailed of the second (Guillim, Display of Heraldry), the differences being in the garnishing of the helmets, the form and tincture of the bordure and (for the crest) the direction in which the lion faces. The pedigree in the 1663 Heraldic Visitation of Middlesex, of "Holliday of Bromley", starting with Sir Leonard Holliday, makes no mention of William Holliday.
