= Giles Green =

English politician

Giles Green was an English politician who sat in the House of Commons at various times between 1621 and 1648.

Green was the son of John Greene a merchant of Dorchester and a friend of Rev John White. He was a prominent citizen of Weymouth, and the town records show payments to him "towards a key and slipp which he hath built upon the town ground on the East side of his house in Hell Lane".

In 1621 Green was elected Member of Parliament (MP) for Weymouth. The "Visitation of Dorset" in 1623 disclaimed him and he is listed at Dorchester as having "usurped the name of Gentleman without authoritie". In 1624, he was one of the founders of the Dorchester Company, an early venture at colonising New England. He became MP for Weymouth again in 1625 after the elected representative found another seat. He was re-elected MP for Weymouth again in 1626. In 1628 he was elected MP for Corfe Castle and sat until 1629 when King Charles decided to rule without parliament for eleven years. Green was of Allington, Dorset, but moved to Dorchester on 24 September 1634 because of his own and his wife's sickness.

In November 1640, Green was elected MP for Corfe Castle in the Long Parliament. He became Receiver of Yorkshire, and from 1645 was a Commissioner of the Navy. He was secluded in 1648 under Pride's Purge.

Green married Elizabeth Hill of Poundsford Park in Somerset. His son later became clerk of the New River Company. His daughter, Katherine married Roger Hill, another Dorset MP, in 1635. Another daughter Sarah married John Bland of London as she named her son Giles Bland after her father. This grandson would later become a participant in Bacon's Rebellion (1676–1677), for which he was executed.

Parliament of England
Preceded by Sir Charles Caesar; Robert Bateman; Barnard Michell; John Roy	Member of Parliament for Weymouth and Melcombe Regis; 1621–1622; With: John Freke; Matthew Pitt; Christopher Erle	Succeeded by Arthur Pyne; Matthew Pitt; Thomas Giear; John Freke
Preceded by Arthur Pyne; Thomas Myddelton; John Freke; Thomas Giear	Member of Parliament for Weymouth and Melcombe Regis; 1625–1626; With: Arthur Pyne; Sir John Strangways; Barnard Michell	Succeeded by Hugh Pyne; Sir Robert Napier; Lewis Dyve; Henry Waltham
Preceded by Edward Daccombe; Sir Robert Napier, 2nd Baronet	Member of Parliament for Corfe Castle; 1628–1629; With: Sir Francis Nethersale	Parliament suspended until 1640
Preceded by Thomas Jermyn; Henry Jermyn	Member of Parliament for Corfe Castle; 1640–1648; With: Sir Francis Windebank; John Borlase; Francis Chettel	Not represented in Rump Parliament
