= Edward Hasted =

British antiquarian (1732–1812)

- Born: 31 December 1732; Lombard Street, London, England
- Died: 14 January 1812 (aged 79); Corsham, Wiltshire, England
- Education: The King's School, Rochester; Eton College
- Alma mater: Lincoln's Inn (did not qualify)
- Occupations: Antiquarian, historian
- Spouse: Anne Dorman (m. 1755; sep. 1790)
- Children: 7 (5 sons, 2 daughters)
- Writing career
- Period: Late 18th century
- Genres: Historiography, local history, county history
- Subject: History of Kent
- Notable works: The History and Topographical Survey of the County of Kent (1778–1799); History of the Antient and Metropolitical City of Canterbury Civil and Ecclesiastical (1799)
- Notable awards: Fellow of the Royal Society (1766)

Edward Hasted (20 December 1732 OS (31 December 1732 NS) – 14 January 1812) was an English antiquarian and pioneering historian of his ancestral home county of Kent. As such, he was the author of a major county history, The History and Topographical Survey of the County of Kent (1778–99).

== Life ==
Hasted was born in Lombard Street, London, the son of Edward Hasted (1702–1740) of Sutton-at-Hone, near Dartford, Kent by his wife, Ann Tyler. His grandfather, Joseph Hasted (1662–1732), had been employed as chief painter at the Royal Navy's Chatham dockyard, but he was also a skilled financier, and amassed a considerable private estate and income. Hasted's father, Edward, became a wealthy barrister, and the young Edward Hasted was educated at Darent (1737–40), The King's School, Rochester (1740–44). From there, he went to Eton College (1744–48), and a school in Esher (1748–50). After completing his education, he was a student for a short time at Lincolns Inn, although he was not called to the bar.

Hasted returned to his parents' home in Sutton-at-Hone, and, in July 1755, married Anne, Dorman, the daughter of a neighbour. In May 1766, he was elected a Fellow of the Royal Society. Hasted acquired The Knights Hospitaller's manor house of St. John's Jerusalem; and it was here that he wrote his magnum opus. He attended the local church regularly, and also sat on the West Kent Quarter Sessions bench at Maidstone. The couple had two daughters and five sons, one of whom was also named Edward. In 1770, they moved to Canterbury, where they lived until 1789, by which time his finances were in total confusion. Although he sold off some of his estates, he sank deeper into debt. In 1790, he left his wife Anne, and fled to France with another woman. There he remained until the war with Napoleon drove him back home and into debtors' prison for almost seven years.

Released in 1802, Hasted lived in poverty for five years until he was given the Mastership of Lady Hungerford's Almshouse in Corsham, Wiltshire, by his friend William Bouverie, 1st Earl of Radnor. Hasted remained Master of the Almshouse from 1807 until his death in 1812, aged 79.

== Works ==
The History and Topographical Survey of the County of Kent was first published in four folio volumes between 1778 and 1799.

A second edition appeared in 12 octavo volumes between 1797 and 1801. It incorporated much new material, but also omitted many details from the first edition: it had been greatly revised by either one or two unidentified editors, and the extent to which it drew on materials collected by Hasted, or to which he was able to influence the work, remains unclear. A modern reprint of the second edition was published in 1972.

Hasted also published a separate History of the Antient and Metropolitical City of Canterbury Civil and Ecclesiastical (1799).

== Bibliography ==
- Black, Shirley Burgoyne (2001). A Scholar and a Gentleman: Edward Hasted, The Historian of Kent. Otford: Darenth Valley Publications. ISBN 0-9507334-8-2.
- Boyle, John (1984). In Quest of Hasted. Chichester: Phillimore. ISBN 0-85033-557-4.
- Everitt, Alan (1978). "Edward Hasted". In Simmons, Jack (ed.). English County Historians: first series. Wakefield: EP Publishing. pp. 189–221. ISBN 0-7158-1309-9.
- Hasted, Edward (1972) [1797]. The History and Topographical Survey of the County of Kent (2nd ed.). Maidstone, UK: EP Publishing and Kent County Library. ISBN 0-85409-789-9.
- Hasted, Edward (1904). Cooke, Richard (ed.). "Anecdotes of the Hasted Family". Archaeologia Cantiana. 26: 267–94.
- Hasted, Edward (1905). Cooke, Richard (ed.). "Letters of Edward Hasted to Thomas Astle". Archaeologia Cantiana. 27: 136–66.
- Ogley, Bob (2003). Kent 1800–1899: A Chronicle of the Nineteenth Century. Froglets Publications. ISBN 1-872337-51-1.
- Yates, Nigel (1994). "Kent". In Currie, C. R. J.; Lewis, C. P. (eds.). English County Histories: a Guide. Stroud: Alan Sutton. pp. 208–15. ISBN 0-7509-0289-2.
