= Richard Yarward =

English grocer and politician

Richard Yarward or Yearwood (1580–1632) was an English grocer and politician who sat in the House of Commons at various times between 1614 and 1629.

Yarward was a grocer of Southwark. He was elected Member of Parliament for Southwark in 1614, and was re-elected in 1621, 1624, 1625, 1626 and 1628, sitting until 1629 when King Charles decided to rule without parliament for eleven years.

Yarwood is identified in the Dictionary of National Biography, under the name Yarwood or Yearwood as the stepfather of John Harvard who gave his name to Harvard College. He married Katherine (née Rogers), who was the widow of Robert Harvard and then John Elletson, at Wandsworth on 28 May 1627. She had come into possession of the "Queen's Head" in Borough High Street from her second husband.

Parliament of England
Preceded by Sir George Rivers; William Counden	Member of Parliament for Southwark; 1614–1629; With: Edward Coxe 1614; Robert Bromfield 1621–1624; William Coxe 1625–1629	Parliament suspended until 1640
