= Martin Bond =

Martin Bond (c. 1558 – May 1643) was an English soldier, merchant adventurer and politician who sat in the House of Commons from 1624 to 1625.

Bond was the son of William Bond, sheriff and alderman of London. In 1588 he was Captain at the camp at Tilbury which was prepared to repel the Spanish Armada, and remained chief captain of the London Trained Bands until his death. He was a Merchant Adventurer and a freeman of the Worshipful Company of Haberdashers.

Bond was Auditor from 1609 to 1611 and became president of the Honourable Artillery Company in 1616. He was treasurer of St. Bartholomew's Hospital from 1620 to his death and auditor again from 1623 to 1625.

In 1624, Bond was elected Member of Parliament for City of London. He was re-elected MP for the City of London in 1625.

Bond died at the age of 85 and was commemorated by a memorial in the church of St Helen Bishopsgate.

Parliament of England
Preceded by William Towerson; Robert Heath; Robert Bateman; Sir Thomas Lowe	Member of Parliament for City of London; 1624–1625; With: Sir Thomas Middleton; Heneage Finch; Robert Bateman	Succeeded by Sir Thomas Middleton; Heneage Finch; Sir Robert Bateman; Sir Maurice Abbot
