= Thomas Freke (died 1701) =

English politician

Thomas Freke (c. 1638–1701), of Shroton and Melcombe Horsey, Dorset, was an English politician.

He was born the third son of John Freke of Cerne Abbas, Dorset, and his second wife Jane Shurley, and studied at the Middle Temple.

He was a Member (MP) of the Parliament of England for Dorset in the periods March 1679 – March 1681, 1685–1687 and 1689 – November 1701 and was picked Sheriff of Dorset for 1663–34.

He married Cicely, the daughter of Robert Hussey of Stourpaine, Dorset, but had no children.

== See also ==
- Thomas Freke (1660–1721)
