= Bromfield baronets =

Extinct baronetcy in the Baronetage of England

The Bromfield Baronetcy, of Southwark in the County of Surrey, was a title in the Baronetage of England. It was created on 20 March 1661 for John Bromfield. The second Baronet was High Sheriff of Surrey in 1689. The title became either extinct or dormant on the death of the third Baronet in 1733.

Sir Edward Bromfield, father of the first Baronet, was Lord Mayor of London from 1636 to 1637.

== Bromfield baronets, of Southwark (1661) ==
- Sir John Bromfield, 1st Baronet (c. 1610–c. 1666)
- Sir Edward Bromfield, 2nd Baronet (c. 1631–1704)
- Sir Charles Bromfield, 3rd Baronet (c. 1672–1733)
