= Leonard Holliday =

Lord Mayor of London, 1605 to 1606

Sir Leonard Halliday
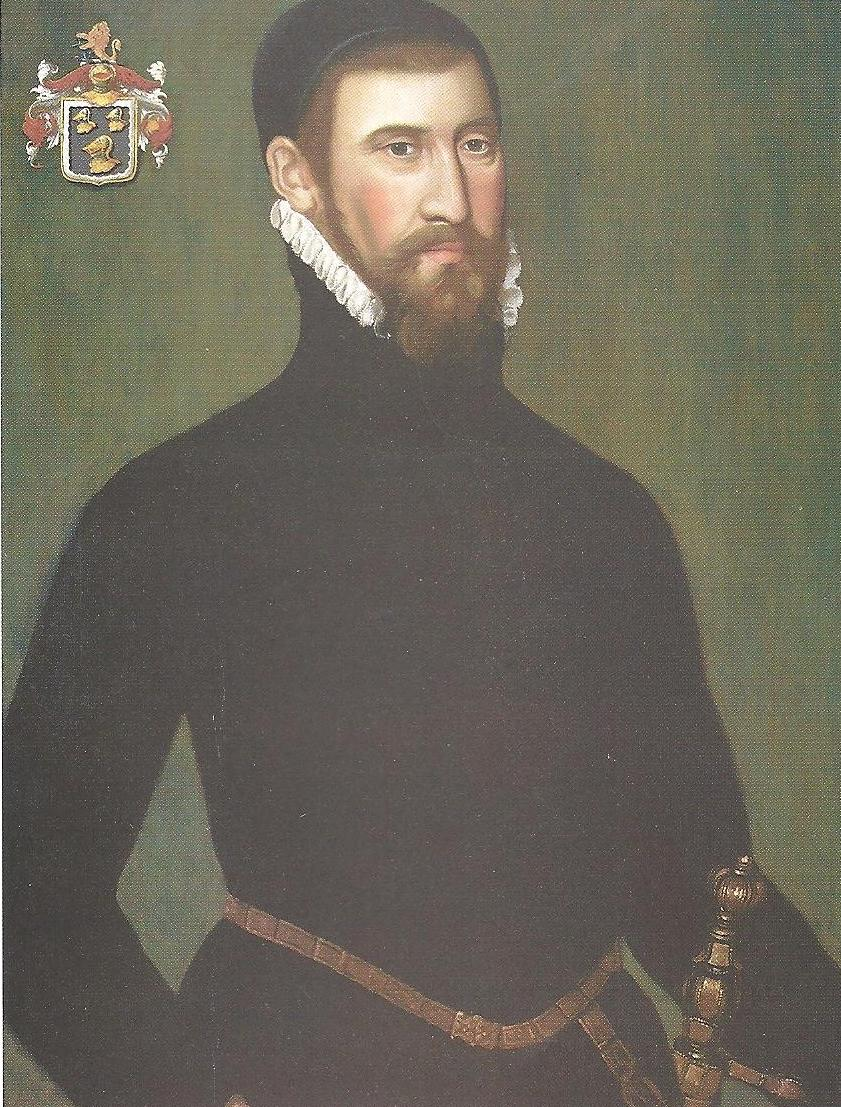
- Born: c. 1550; Rodborough, Gloucestershire
- Died: 9 January 1612
- Occupation: Lord Mayor of London

Note: dates are given using the New Style calendar.

Sir Leonard Holliday (also spelled Hollyday and Halliday; c. 1550 – 9 January 1612) was a founder of the East India Company, and a Lord Mayor of London.

== Life ==
He was born, perhaps circa 1550, in Rodborough in Gloucestershire, the son of clothmaker William Halliday and his wife Sarah Brydges, who was the aunt of John, Lord Chandos. At some point, perhaps in the late 1560s, he was sent to London, where he served an apprenticeship in the Worshipful Company of Merchant Taylors, which controlled the men's garment industry in the city.

In May 1578, he married an heiress: Anne, daughter of William Wincoll (or Wincott or Winhold) of Suffolk. They had three children: Rowland (born in 1579 and died in 1580), John (born in 1582 and died in 1610), and Walter (died in 1598).

== Business and civic affairs ==
In 1592, Leonard expanded his business interests by becoming a member of the Levant Company. In 1594, he was one of fourteen members of the Merchant Taylors Company who each pledged money to support an indigent widow through one of the company's charitable schemes.

He entered local government, as an alderman, in 1594, and was also one of the city's sheriffs for 1595–96.

In September 1599, he and 124 other merchants formed 'The Governor and Merchants of the City of London Trading to the East Indies', otherwise known as the East India Company. It was chartered on 31 December 1600. While membership was open to the public (known as 'the generality'), executive control was restricted to the merchant élite, and Leonard was not only one of the original 'committees' (i.e. directors) but also joint treasurer from 1600 until 1602.

The EIC's first two trading expeditions to India were profitable and earned investors a healthy return, as well as supplying the merchants with imported merchandise to re-sell at profit. Leonard invested £1000 – the largest individual stake – in the first voyage.

Leonard was knighted by King James I on 26 July 1603. He was one of 906 men knighted by the new king during the first four months of his reign.

== Lord Mayor ==
Sir Leonard served as Lord Mayor of London from 29 October 1605 to October 1606. His installation was celebrated with a pageant, 'The Triumphs of Reunited Britannia'. A week later, on 5 November 1605, a plot to assassinate the king by blowing up the Houses of Parliament was foiled. As Lord Mayor, Sir Leonard was responsible for maintaining public order during the trial and execution of the conspirators in January 1606. On 2 August 1606, Sir Leonard hosted the king and his brother-in-law, King Christian IV of Denmark during the latter's state visit to England.

The lasting legacy of Sir Leonard's lord mayoralty was the redevelopment of the Moorfields, a swamp just north of the city wall. In the face of great public criticism, he had the area drained and surfaced, and laid out gardens and walks. The workers found it such an unpleasant project that they coined the slang term 'Holidaye worke' to refer to hard labour.

== Final years ==
Sir Leonard was Master of the Merchant Taylors Company for 1605–06, continued as a 'committee' of the East India Company, invested £400 in the company's third voyage and stood unsuccessfully for the EIC governorship (i.e. chairmanship) in 1609.

He died on 9 January 1612, leaving a sizeable estate. In November 1613, his widow married Sir Henry Montagu (later 1st Earl of Manchester). She died in 1619.

== Coat of arms ==
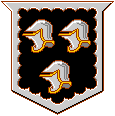

In 1605, Sir Leonard obtained a confirmation of arms and the grant of a crest from the College of Arms. "Confirm" indicates that Sir Leonard was already using the arms, "grant" that the crest was new. The arms were: Sable, three helmets Argent garnished Or, within a bordure engrailed of the second, i.e. a black shield displaying three silver helmets with gold trimming, all within an engrailed silver border. The crest was the upper half of a gold lion, facing the viewer, holding an anchor.

Civic offices
| Preceded by Sir Thomas Lowe | Lord Mayor of the City of London; 1605 | Succeeded by Sir John Watts |
