= Edward Bromfield =

English merchant

Sir Edward Bromfield was an English merchant who was Lord Mayor of London in 1636.

Bromfield was a city of London merchant and a member of the Worshipful Company of Leathersellers. He was Master of the Leathersellers Company from 1625 to 1626. On 14 March 1626, he was elected an alderman of the City of London for Dowgate ward. He was Sheriff of London from 1626 to 1627, He translated to Worshipful Company of Fishmongers on 22 March 1636. In 1636, he was elected Lord Mayor of London and was also Prime Warden of the Fishmongers Company. He became alderman for Walbrook ward in 1637 and was knighted on 4 June 1637. He was Governor of the Irish Society from 1637 to 1638 and Colonel of the Trained Bands from 1638 to 1642.

Bromfield married Margaret Payne, daughter of John Payne of Southwark. His eldest son John was created baronet. His daughter married Sir Henry Hudson, 1st Baronet.

Civic offices
Preceded by Christopher Clitherow	Lord Mayor of the City of London; 1636	Succeeded by Richard Venn
