= William Bunce =

English footballer

William Bunce (April 1877 – unknown) was an English footballer who played as a full-back. Born in Swallowfield, Berkshire, he played for Rochdale Athletic, Stockport County and Manchester United.
