= Charles Caesar =

English judge

Sir Charles Caesar
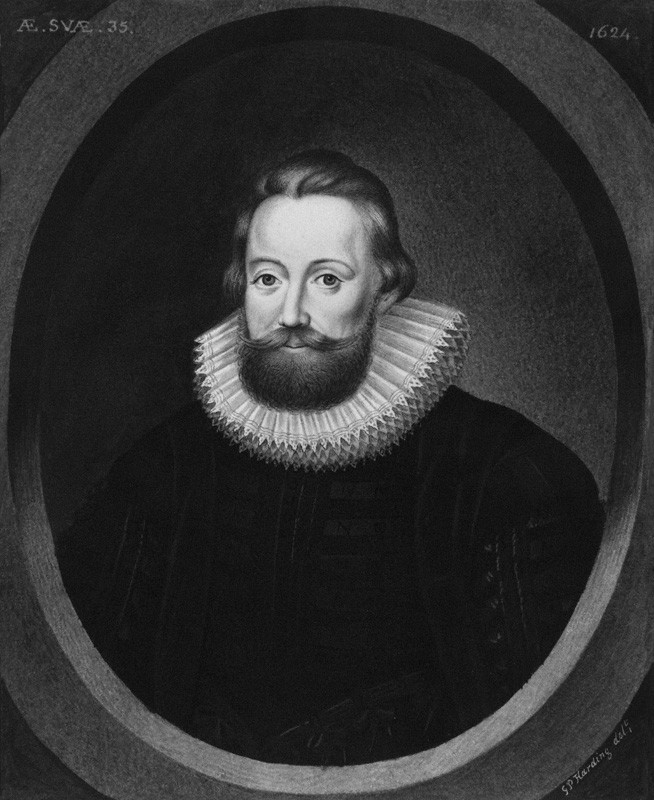

Master of the Rolls
- Nominated by: Lord Hardwicke
- Preceded by: Sir Dudley Digges
- Succeeded by: Sir John Colepeper
- In office 30 March 1639 – 28 January 1643

Personal details
- Born: 27 February 1590
- Died: 6 December 1642 (aged 52)
- Spouse(s): Anne Vanlore, Jane Barkham
- Children: Julius Caesar, Henry Caesar, Charles Caesar
- Education: Magdalen College, Oxford
- Profession: Barrister, judge, politician

Sir Charles Caesar (27 January 1590 – 6 December 1642), of Benington in Hertfordshire, was an English judge who served as Master of the Rolls in the period leading up to the outbreak of the English Civil War; his father, Sir Julius Caesar, had held the same office for many years.

Caesar entered Magdalen College, Oxford, aged 12 in 1602, and was a fellow of All Souls from 1605 to 1611. He was incorporated at Cambridge with a LL.B. in 1609, but continued at Oxford, where he was made Doctor of Civil and Canon Law in 1612. In 1611 he joined the Middle Temple and began to practice in the ecclesiastical courts; he was knighted in 1613, and served as MP for Weymouth in the Addled Parliament of 1614.

In 1615, he was appointed a master in chancery, no doubt through the influence of his father, and continued in this post until 1639; he was also from before 1626 a judge of the Court of Audience and Master of the Faculties, both appointments which held until his death. In 1639 the Mastership of the Rolls became vacant on the death of Sir Dudley Digges, and Caesar consulted Archbishop Laud on whether he might obtain it, but was warned "that as things then stood, the place was not like to go without more money than he thought any wise man would give for it". Caesar apparently paid the King £15,000 in a lump sum with a further £2,000 loan, and was duly appointed.

Foss in his Lives of the Judges comments that "It is difficult to regret that he did not live long enough to profit by this iniquitous traffic of the judicial seat, as disgraceful to one party as the other". He had made little mark through his tenure of the post when his family was struck down by smallpox in November 1642: one of his daughters died on 2 November, he himself did so on 6 December 1642 (even though, as he declared in the will he made on his death-bed, he had already had the disease as a younger man), and his eldest son, Julius, followed five days later. He was succeeded by his second son, Henry, still a minor at the time of his father's death.

== Sources ==
- Edward Foss, The Judges of England, Volume 6 (London: Longman, Brown, Green, Longmans & Roberts, 1857)
- Edward Wedlake Brayley, The Beauties of England and Wales (London: Longman, Hurst, Rees & Orme, etc., 1808)
- Evan Haynes, The Selection and Tenure of Judges (Newark: The National Conference of Judicial Councils, 1944, reprinted January 2005 by the Lawbook Exchange, Ltd)
- Maija Jansson (ed.), Proceedings in Parliament, 1614 (House of Commons) (Philadelphia: American Philosophical Society, 1988)

Parliament of England
Preceded by Viscount Cranborne; Robert Myddelton; Bernard Michell; Sir John Hanham	Member of Parliament for Weymouth and Melcombe Regis; 1614; With: Robert Bateman (MP); Bernard Michell; John Roy	Succeeded by Matthew Pitt; Giles Green; John Freke; Christopher Erle
Legal offices
Preceded by Sir Dudley Digges	Master of the Rolls; 30 March 1639 — 28 January 1643	Succeeded by Sir John Colepeper
