= Titus-Bunce House =

Historic house in New York, United States

- U.S. National Register of Historic Places
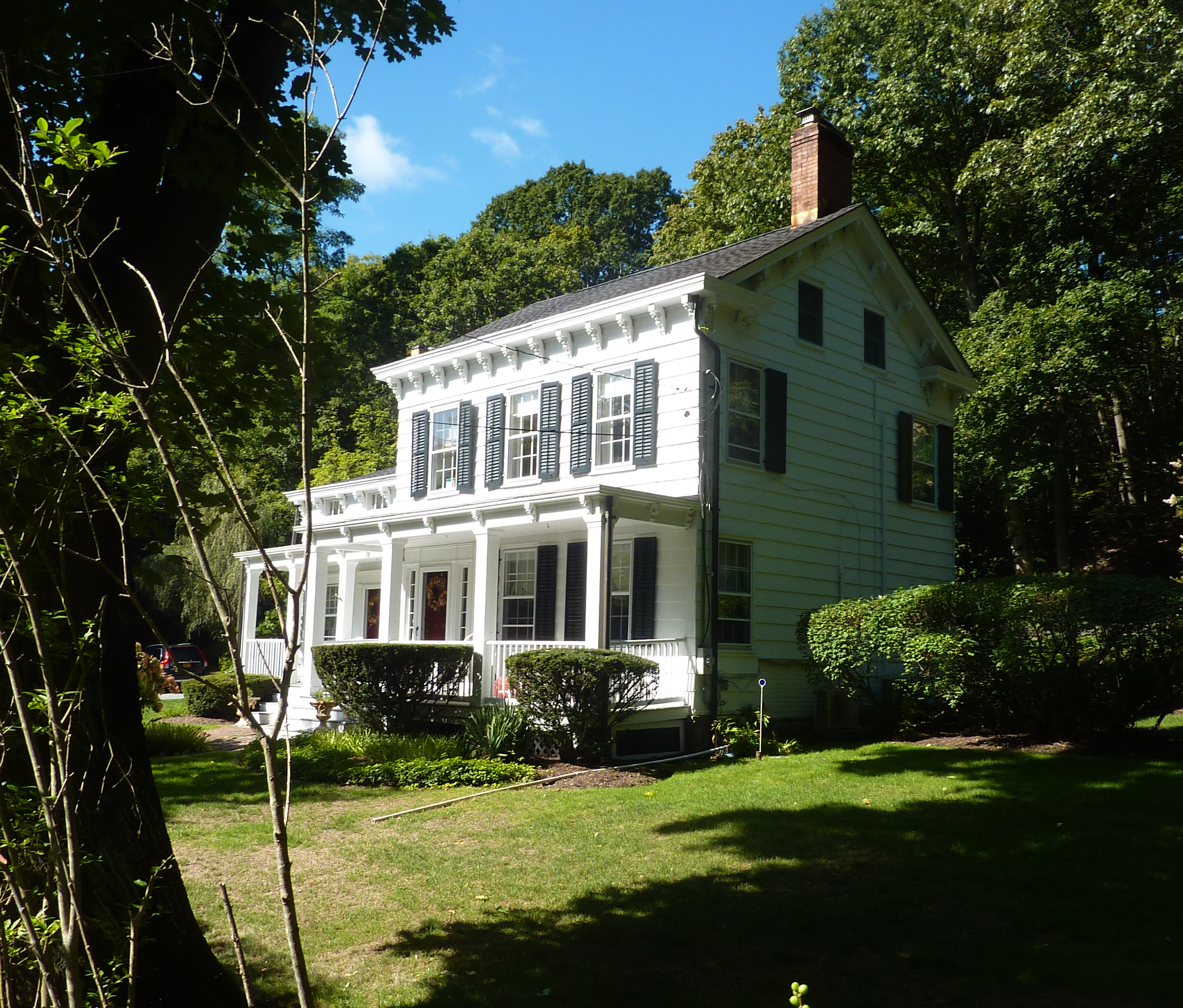

- Location within New York Location within the United States
- Location: 7 Goose Hill Rd., Cold Spring Harbor, New York
- Coordinates: 40°52′27″N 73°27′6″W
- Area: 1 acre (0.40 ha)
- Built: 1820
- Architectural style: Greek Revival, Italianate
- MPS: Huntington Town MRA
- NRHP reference No.: 85002542
- Added to NRHP: September 26, 1985

Titus-Bunce House is a historic home located at Cold Spring Harbor in Suffolk County, New York. It is a 2-story, three-bay structure with a 1 1/2-story, three-bay side wing. It was built about 1820, with decorative additional made in the 1850s in the Italianate style.

It was added to the National Register of Historic Places in 1985.
