= Francis James (MP) =

English politician

Francis James (1559–1616), of Wells and Bristol, was an English politician.

He was a Member (MP) of the Parliament of England for Dorchester in 1593, for Corfe Castle in 1597, for Minehead in 1601 and for Wareham in 1604. His brother, William James, was bishop of Durham.
