= James Bunce (MP) =

English politician

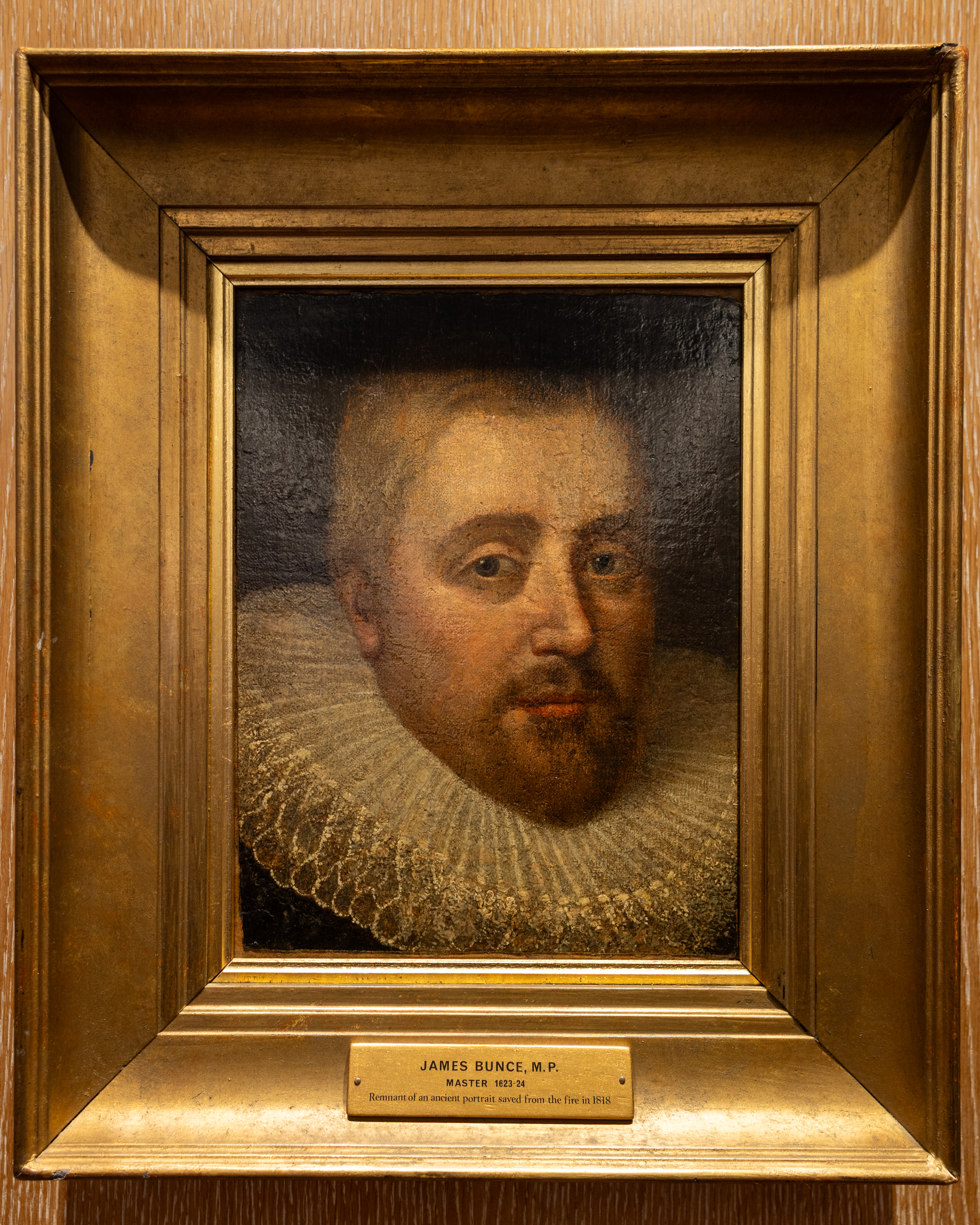
Portrait of Bunce in Leathersellers' Hall, London

James Bunce (c. 1563–1632), of St. Benet Gracechurch, London, was an English politician.

He was a member (MP) of the Parliament of England for City of London in 1628, and was Master of the Leathersellers' Company 1623–24.
