= Bunce baronets =

Extinct baronetcy in the Baronetage of England

The Bunce Baronetcy, of Otterden in the County of Kent, was a title in the Baronetage of England. It was created in May 1660 for Sir James Bunce, Sheriff of the City of London from 1643 to 1644. The title became either extinct or dormant on the death of the sixth Baronet in 1741.

== Bunce baronets, of Otterden (1660) ==
- Sir James Bunce, 1st Baronet (c. 1600–1670)
- Sir John Bunce, 2nd Baronet (1630–1683)
- Sir John Bunce, 3rd Baronet (c. 1659–1687)
- Sir James Bunce, 4th Baronet (died c. 1710)
- Sir John Bunce, 5th Baronet (died c. 1720)
- Sir James Bunce, 6th Baronet (died 1741)
