= Nicholas Fuller (lawyer) =

16th and 17th-century English barrister and Member of Parliament

Sir Nicholas Fuller

Member of Parliament for City of London
- In office 1604–1611
- Preceded by: Stephen Soame

Member of Parliament for St Mawes
- In office 1593–1597
- Succeeded by: Michael Vyvyan; Richard Orver

Personal details
- Born: 1543
- Died: 23 February 1620 (aged 76–77) Chamberhouse, Thatcham
- Spouse: Sarah Backhouse
- Children: Elizabeth; Nicholas
- Education: Christ's College, Cambridge
- Profession: barrister, politician

Sir Nicholas Fuller (1543 – 23 February 1620) was an English barrister and Member of Parliament. After studying at Christ's College, Cambridge, Fuller became a barrister of Gray's Inn. His legal career there began prosperously—he was employed by the Privy Council to examine witnesses—but was hampered later by his representation of the Puritans, a religious tendency which did not conform with the established Church of England. Fuller was repeatedly in contention with the ecclesiastical courts, including the Star Chamber and Court of High Commission, and was once expelled for the zeal with which he defended his client. In 1593 he was returned as the Member of Parliament for St Mawes, where he campaigned against the extension of recusancy laws. Outside of Parliament, he successfully brought a patents case which not only undermined the right of the Crown to issue patents but accurately predicted the attitude taken by the Statute of Monopolies two decades later.

Returned to Parliament in 1604 for the City of London, Fuller became considered the "leader of the opposition" due to his conflict with the government over policy, fighting the impositions on currants, the patent on blue starch, and opposing the proposed union with Scotland on legal and economic grounds. In 1607, in what became known as Fuller's Case, he again began challenging the Court of High Commission, and eventually got the Court of Common Pleas under Sir Edward Coke to agree that the common law courts had the power to free imprisoned ecclesiastical prisoners. These encounters with the ecclesiastical courts were described as "bruising", but by 1610 he was considered an "elder statesman", introducing bills on ecclesiastical reform and the statutory management of customs duties. He continued to sit in Parliament until his death on 23 February 1620.

== Early life and career ==
Fuller was born in 1543 to Nicholas Fuller of Neat's Hall on the Isle of Sheppey, a merchant from London. In December 1560 he was admitted to Christ's College, Cambridge, and graduated in 1563, joining Gray's Inn during the same year. After an initial upset (on 26 May 1579, it was noted that "Mr Fuller, Reader of Staple Inn, is discharged for negligence, and fined £1"), Fuller was highly successful at Gray's; he became Reader on 26 May 1587, Dean of the chapel on 8 February 1588 and Treasurer in 1591. Fuller was a Puritan, and much engaged in their legal and other activities, for example, he arranged a lecturer for St Christopher le Stocks, a church in London, in April 1577.

From December 1588 he was employed repeatedly by the Privy Council to examine witnesses, and in 1590 was charged with interrogating Sir Thomas Fitzherbert. Although his career had begun promisingly, Fuller soon found himself at odds with the authorities due to his religion, and the religion of those he chose to represent. A favoured barrister of Puritans prosecuted based on their faith, Fuller represented John Udall at Croydon assizes, when Udall was charged with having written A Discovery of the Discipline, an allegedly seditious book. The judge instructed the jury to find Udall guilty, and "leave the felony to us"; Fuller protested so vociferously at this that he was forced out of the court. In 1591, following the collapse of their case in front of the Court of High Commission, Thomas Cartwright and other Puritan ministers were tried by the Star Chamber; Fuller provided legal representation. The case was made more complicated when several of the ministers, on 16 July 1591, "proclaimed Elizabeth deposed, and William Hacket the new messiah and king of Europe"; this certainly was sedition, and saw the ministers confined to Fleet Prison, along with Fuller for offering to represent them. Cartwright and several other ministers were never convicted, however, which is attributed to "the highly professional resistance of the puritan lawyers [which] perhaps owed much to Nicholas Fuller". Fuller was confined until 15 August.

== Parliament ==
=== Puritanism and patents ===
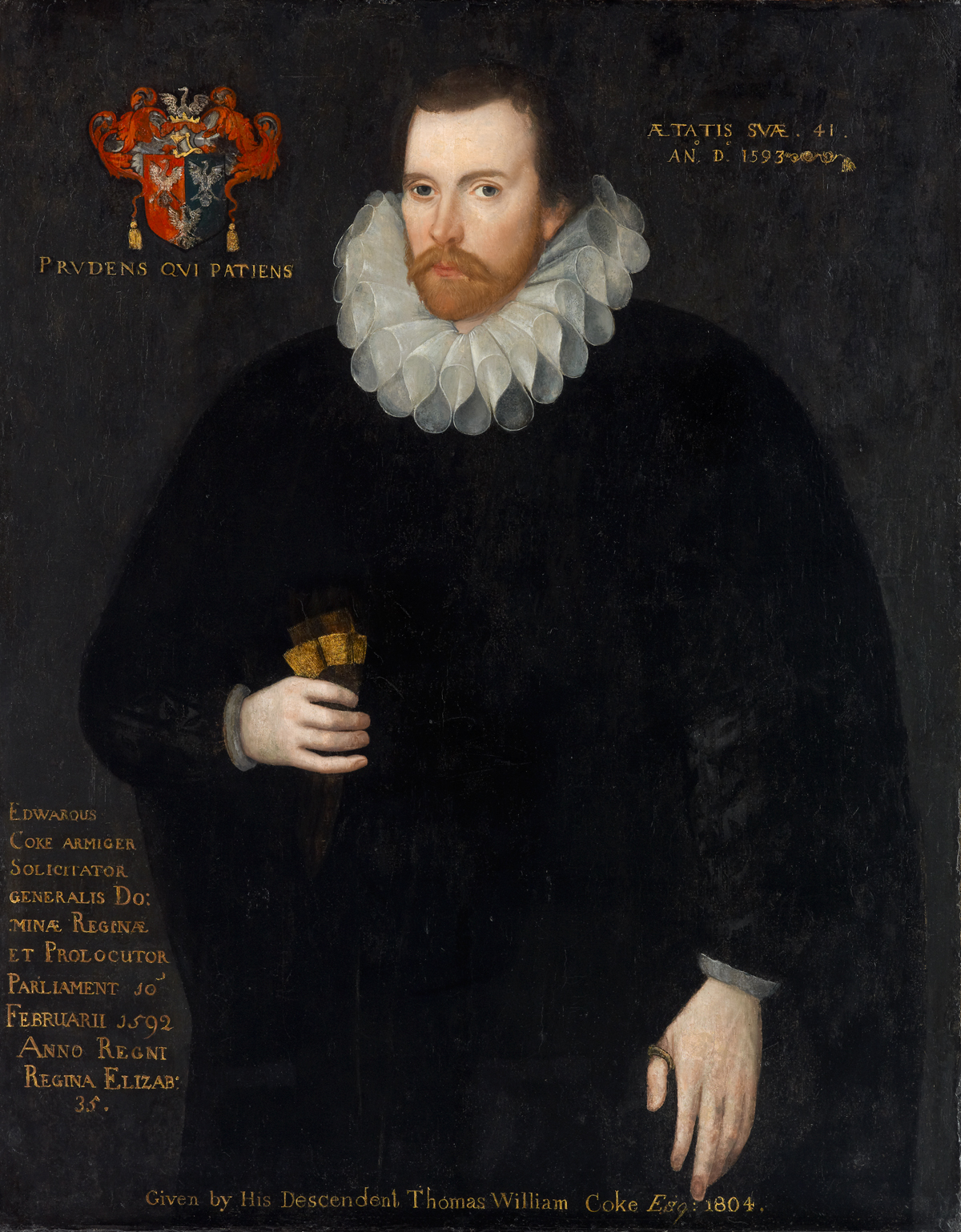
Sir Edward Coke, Fuller's opponent during the dispute over playing card patents.

Fuller was returned for St Mawes in 1593, apparently thanks to the influence of William Cecil, and immediately began campaigning against government attempts to extend recusancy laws to Protestant splitters from the Church of England. The government introduced two such bills; the second, sent down from the House of Lords on 5 April 1593, was protested down by Fuller as "dangerous to good subjects", because it made "schisms to be equal with seditions and treasons, which is against the equity of the former law". According to records, "upon a motion of Mr Fuller's, the whole committee assented to the striking out of the title and the whole preamble. No man spake for it". While an MP, Fuller became involved in patents cases, which continued after he left Parliament in 1597.

Patents were initially intended to provide protection to merchants of new industries, making England an attractive country to conduct business in. The granting of these patents was highly popular with the monarch, both before and after the statute of Monopolies, because of the potential for raising revenue. A patentee was expected to pay heavily for the patent, and unlike a tax raise (another method of raising Crown money) any public unrest as a result of the patent was normally directed at the patentee, not the monarch. Over time, this became more and more problematic: instead of temporary monopolies on specific, imported industries, long-term monopolies came about over common commodities, including salt and starch. These "odious monopolies" led to a showdown between the Crown and Parliament, in which it was agreed, on 28 November 1601, to turn the power to administer patents over to the common law courts; at the same time, Elizabeth revoked a number of the more restrictive and damaging monopolies. One of the monopolies capable of being addressed at the common law was that over playing cards, which was granted to Edward Darcy on 13 June 1600. Darcy, in 1602, began proceedings against a Mr Allen for infringing on this patent.

The Crown was represented by Sir Edward Coke, then Attorney General for England and Wales, while George Croke and Fuller appeared for Allen. Coke argued that the Crown had the right to restrict "games of common good", while Croke said that the free trade principles of the City of London rendered the patent invalid. Fuller, however, "stole the show". He stated that only a new trade, or "a new engine tending to the furtherance of a trade that never was used before; and that for the good of the realm, the King may grant him a monopoly patent for some reasonable time until the subjects may learn the same, in consideration of the good that he doth bring by his invention, otherwise not". In this, he accurately predicted the attitude taken by the Statute of Monopolies two decades later.

=== Leader of the opposition ===
Fuller did not stand for election to the Commons in 1597; after its dissolution, he was returned for the City of London in the 1604 Parliament of James I. He was highly active in opposing the government, to the point where academics consider him the "leader of the opposition", although this was not a formal title at the time. During his first year, Fuller opposed the impositions on currants, the patent on blue starch, presented a petition on economic grievances (which delayed the passage of the subsidy bill), supported the restoration of removed ministers and further attacked the powers of the Court of High Commission.

In 1606, the government announced plans for a formal union between England and Scotland. This project was treated with great suspicion in the House of Commons, and Fuller took the lead in opposing it. Although he used racist language, saying in December 1606 that "the Scots in other countries are more like pedlars than merchants", this was aimed at drumming up support from xenophobic elements, and Wright concludes he was not himself a xenophobe. His main concern, rather, was over economic issues. Fuller argued that the Scottish merchants would undercut and impoverish English ones, and that the markets could not handle such an influx, saying that it was "fit that we seek room to place them in before we admit them". There was also a legal and constitutional element. The proposal was to allow all Scottish citizens, born before or after the union, to become English citizens, exercisable through the Royal Prerogative. Fuller argued that this right was only exercisable by Parliament, and believed that the extension of the Royal Prerogative would lead to future encroachment on the civil liberties of English citizens.

== Fuller's Case and the Case of Prohibitions ==
In 1607, Fuller began challenging the Court of High Commission yet again, an ecclesiastical court established by the monarch with nearly unlimited power. The High Commission was vastly unpopular amongst both common lawyers and members of parliament, as the idea of "prerogative law" challenged both authorities. The appointment of Richard Bancroft as Archbishop of Canterbury in 1604 caused the issue to grow in importance; Bancroft's zeal and strictness "could hardly fail to produce an atmosphere in which principles and issues would crystallize, in which logic would supplant reasonableness". The judges, particularly Sir Edward Coke, began to unite with Parliament in challenging the High Commission. The High Commission tried people for heresy, based on their internal thoughts and private beliefs, in "a trap to catch unwary or ingenuous men – 'an unlawful process of poking about in the speculation of finding something chargeable'".

In what became known as Fuller's Case, Fuller had several clients fined by the High Commission for non-conformity, and stated that the High Commission's procedure was "popish, under jurisdiction not of Christ but of anti-Christ". For this, Fuller was held in custody for contempt of court. The Court of King's Bench argued that this was a lay matter, while the High Commission claimed it fell under their jurisdiction. In the end, Fuller was convicted by the High Commission, although of heresy rather than contempt, and sent to Fleet prison. On 6 November 1608, the common law judges and members of the High Commission were summoned before the King and told that they would argue and allow him to decide. Unable to even argue properly, instead "[standing] sullen, merely denying each other's statements", the group were dismissed and reconvened a week later. Sir Edward Coke, speaking for the judges, argued that ecclesiastical courts only had jurisdiction as long as no temporal matters were involved; once this happened, it became a matter for the common law courts.

At this point, the King's own position in relation to the law, and his authority to decide this matter, was brought up, in what became known as the Case of Prohibitions. James stated that "In cases where there is not express authority in law, the King may himself decide in his royal person; the Judges are but delegates of the King". Coke challenged this, saying "the King in his own person cannot adjudge any case, either criminal – as treason, felony etc, or betwixt party and party; but this ought to be determined and adjudged in some court of justice, according to the Law and Custom of England". Coke further stated that "The common law protecteth the King", to which James replied "The King protecteth the law, and not the law the King! The King maketh judges and bishops. If the judges interpret the laws themselves and suffer none else to interpret, they may easily make, of the laws, shipmen's hose!". Coke rejected this, stating that while the monarch was not subject to any individual, he was subject to the law. Until he had gained sufficient knowledge of the law, he had no right to interpret it; he pointed out that such knowledge "demanded mastery of an artificial reason ... which requires long study and experience, before that a man can attain to the cognizance of it". Victorious, Coke freely left, and continued to issue writs of prohibition against the High Commission.

== Later career and death ==
By 1610, Fuller was considered an "elder statesman" within Parliament, "although his influence may have been somewhat weakened by the bruising encounters with high commission and star chamber". He introduced two bills to reform or remove ecclesiastical committees and courts, which passed in the House of Commons of England on 21 May and 20 June, though both were later rejected by the Lords. On 3 November he began campaigning to have customs duties put into a statutory framework, again against the Court of High Commission, which, he claimed, as an unelected and autonomous body could not be trusted, but rather Parliament should be given jurisdiction. In a speech on 23 June 1610, he said that "the laws of England are the most high inheritance of the land, whereby both king and subjects are directed and guided". Customs were "not at the king's pleasure to be increased without the consent of the subjects", and "impositions and customs laid on subjects' goods and merchandise...was always done by several acts of parliament". Wright notes that this was apparently greeted with complete silence, possibly because, while the MPs agreed that civil liberties had been eroded, they felt it was too dangerous to reclaim them. On 23 February 1620, Fuller died at his home, Chamberhouse, at Crookham in Thatcham, Berkshire, and was buried at the village's parish church on 2 March. Most of his estate was passed to his wife, Sarah (sister of Samuel Backhouse MP), and his eldest son, Nicholas, who died only four months later, leaving a three-year-old son.

== Bibliography ==
- Bowen, Catherine Drinker (1957). The Lion and the Throne. Hamish Hamilton. OCLC 398917.
- Cover, Robert M.; Minow, Martha; Ryan, Michael (1992). Narrative, violence, and the law: the essays of Robert Cover. University of Michigan Press. ISBN 0-472-06495-9.
- Hostettler, John (2009). A history of criminal justice in England and Wales. Waterside Press. ISBN 978-1-904380-51-1.
- Loveland, Ian (2009). Constitutional Law, Administrative Law, and Human Rights: A Critical Introduction (5th ed.). Oxford University Press. ISBN 978-0-19-921974-2.
- Pila, Justine (2001). "The common law invention in its original form". Intellectual Property Quarterly. 3 (1). Sweet & Maxwell. ISSN 1364-906X.
- Ramsey, George (1936). "The Historical Background of Patents". Journal of the Patent Office Society. 18 (1). Patent and Trademark Office Society. ISSN 0096-3577.
- Usher, Roland G. (1907). "Nicholas Fuller: A Forgotten Exponent of English Liberty". American Historical Review. 12 (4). American Historical Association: 743–760. doi:10.2307/1839185. ISSN 0002-8762. JSTOR 1839185.
- Waite, P.B. (1959). "The Struggle of Prerogative and Common Law in the Reign of James I". Canadian Journal of Economics and Political Science. 25 (2). Canadian Economics Association: 144–152. doi:10.2307/139057. ISSN 0315-4890. JSTOR 139057.
- Wright, Stephen (2006). "Nicholas Fuller and the Liberties of the Subject". Parliamentary History. 25 (2). Edinburgh University Press: 176–213. doi:10.1353/pah.2006.0036. ISSN 0264-2824. S2CID 201769001.

Parliament of England
Preceded by Stephen Soame	Member of Parliament for City of London; 1604–1614	Unknown
Preceded by John Potts; Walter Cope	Member of Parliament for St Mawes; 1593–1597; With: Henry Vincent	Succeeded by Michael Vyvyan; Richard Orver
