= Henry Montagu, 1st Earl of Manchester =

Engĺish peer (c. 1563 – 1642)

The Right Honourable The Earl of Manchester
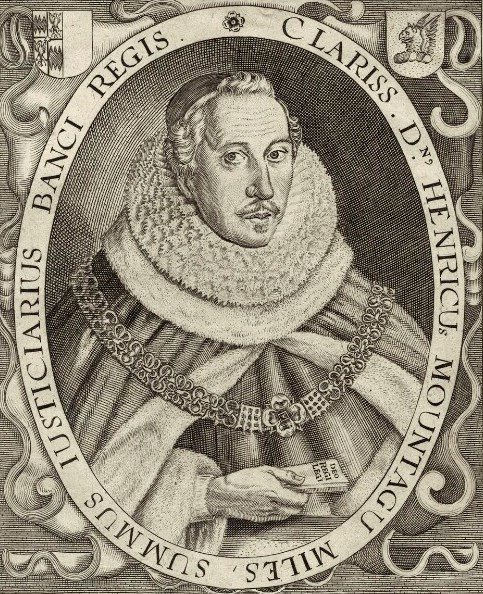

Lord High Treasurer
- In office 1620–1621
- Preceded by: In Commission; George Abbot as first lord
- Succeeded by: Lionel Cranfield, 1st Earl of Middlesex

Lord Chief Justice of England
- In office 1616–1621
- Preceded by: Edward Coke
- Succeeded by: James Ley

Personal details
- Born: 1563
- Died: 7 November 1642 (aged 78/79)
- Spouse(s): Catherine Spencer; Anne Holliday; Margaret Crouch
- Children: Edward Montagu, 2nd Earl of Manchester; Walter Montagu; George Montagu
- Parent(s): Edward Montagu of Boughton; Elizabeth Harington
- Education: Christ's College, Cambridge

Henry Montagu, 1st Earl of Manchester (c. 1563 – 7 November 1642) was an English judge, politician and peer. He is mainly remembered today as the judge who sentenced Sir Walter Raleigh to death.

== Life ==
Henry was the 3rd son of Edward Montagu of Boughton and Elizabeth Harington. His grandfather, Sir Edward Montagu, Lord Chief Justice of the King's Bench from 1539 to 1545, was named by King Henry VIII one of the executors of his will, and governor to his son, Edward VI.

Henry was born at Boughton, Northamptonshire, about 1563. He was educated at Christ's College, Cambridge, was admitted to Middle Temple on 6 November 1585 and was Called to the Bar on 9 June 1592. He was elected recorder of London in 1603, and in 1616 was made Chief Justice of the King's Bench, in which office it fell to him to pass sentence on Sir Walter Raleigh in October 1618.

Henry had a windfall inheritance in March 1618 from Roger Montagu, a London rich mercer who had been silkman to King James.

In 1620, Henry was appointed Lord High Treasurer, being raised to the peerage as Viscount Mandeville and Baron Montagu of Kimbolton, Huntingdonshire. He became President of the Council in 1621, in which office he was continued by Charles I, who created him Earl of Manchester in 1626. In 1628, he became Lord Privy Seal, and in 1635 a commissioner of the treasury.

Although from the beginning of his public life in 1601, when he first entered Parliament, Henry had inclined to the popular side in politics, he managed to retain to the end the favour of the King. He was a judge of the Star Chamber, and one of the most trusted councillors of Charles I. His loyalty, ability, and honesty were warmly praised by Clarendon. In conjunction with Coventry, the Lord Keeper, he pronounced an opinion in favour of the legality of ship money in 1634.

== Family ==
Henry was married three times: first, Catherine Spencer, daughter of Sir William Spencer of Yarnton, Oxfordshire; second, Anne Holliday (née Wincot), in 1613, daughter of William Wincot of Langham, Suffolk, and widow of Sir Leonard Holliday, third, Margaret Crouch, on 26 April 1620, daughter of John Crouch of Cornbury, Hertfordshire, who died in 1653.

Henry was succeeded by his eldest son, Edward Montagu, Viscount Mandeville, from his first marriage. The second son of Henry and Catherine was Walter Montagu, the courtier and abbot. Another son he had with Catherine Spencer was James Montagu who served as MP for Huntingdon in the English House of Commons alongside Oliver Cromwell in 1628.

One of his sons by his third wife, Margaret Crouch, was George Montagu, father of Charles Montagu, created Earl of Halifax in 1699, and James Montagu, Attorney General from 1708 to 1710.

== Notes ==
Political offices
Preceded by The Lord St John of Bletso; The Duke of Lennox	Lord Lieutenant of Huntingdonshire jointly with The Lord St John of Bletso 1624–1627, 1629–1636; 1624–1642	English Interregnum
Legal offices
Preceded by Edward Coke	Lord Chief Justice; 1616–1621	Succeeded by James Ley
Preceded by The Archbishop of Canterbury as First Lord of the Treasury	Lord High Treasurer; 1620–1621	Succeeded by The Earl of Middlesex
Peerage of England
New title	Earl of Manchester; 1626–1642	Succeeded by Edward Montagu
New title	Viscount Mandeville; 1620–1642	Succeeded by Edward Montagu
New title	Baron Montagu of Kimbolton; 1620–1626	Succeeded by Edward Montagu
