= Ceiriog Rural District =

Abolished Welsh rural district

Coordinates: 52.930°N 3.050°W

Ceiriog
- Area
  - 1951: 63,269 acres (256.04 km^{2})
  - 1961: 63,269 acres (256.04 km^{2})
- Population
  - 1951: 7,632
  - 1971: 6,818
- History
  - Created: 1935
  - Abolished: 1974
  - Succeeded by: Glyndwr
- Status: Rural District
  - HQ: Chirk

Ceiriog was a rural district in the administrative county of Denbighshire from 1935 to 1974.

The rural district was formed by a County Review Order in 1935 from the merger of Chirk and Llansillin Rural districts. The district was named after the Ceiriog Valley.

The district contained nine civil parishes:

- Chirk
- Glyntraian
- Llanarmon Dyffryn Ceiriog
- Llanarmon Mynydd Mawr
- Llangadwaladr
- Llangedwyn
- Llanrhaeadr ym Mochnant
- Llansantffraid Glynceiriog
- Llansilin

The rural district was abolished in 1974 by the Local Government Act 1972, with its area becoming part of the district of Glyndŵr, one of six districts of Clwyd.
