= Ceiriog Ucha =

Community in Wrexham County Borough, Wales

Coordinates: 52.897°N 3.255°W

Ceiriog Ucha: Ceiriog Uchaf
- Community
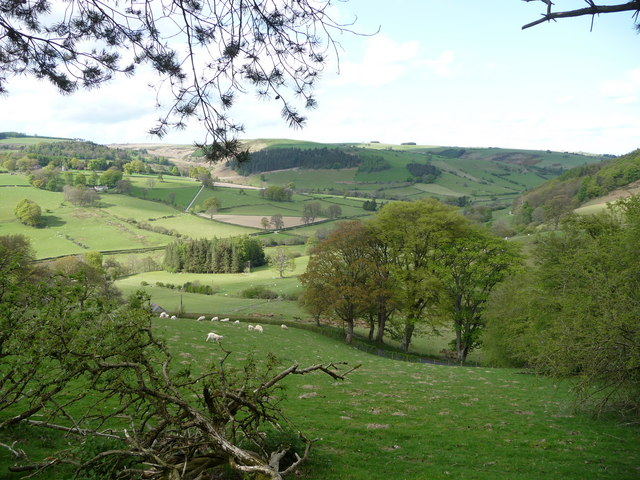
- View over the upper Ceiriog Valley in the community of Ceiriog Ucha
- Principal area: Wrexham
- Country: Wales
- Sovereign state: United Kingdom
- Ambulance: Welsh
- List of places UK Wales Map of the community

Ceiriog Ucha, also spelled as Ceiriog Uchaf (Welsh for 'upper Ceiriog'), is a community in Wrexham County Borough, Wales. The community lies in the Ceiriog Valley and comprises the villages of Llanarmon Dyffryn Ceiriog and Tregeiriog as well as surrounding farmland and grouse and pheasant moors. It is a rural district set in low hills. The area is governed by Ceiriog Uchaf Community Council, and had a total population of 346, in 129 households, at the 2001 census. reducing to 317 in 2011.

== Civil administration ==
The area was originally part of the Llansillin Rural District of Denbighshire and was made up of the civil parishes of Llanarmon Dyffryn Ceiriog and Llangadwaladr. In 1935, these parishes were transferred to the new Ceiriog Rural District. The Local Government Act 1972 abolished all of these administrative structures, replacing them with the new Community of Ceiriog Ucha, part of the Glyndŵr district of Clwyd.

A further reorganisation in 1996 saw Clwyd itself abolished, Ceiriog Ucha becoming part of Wrexham County Borough.

== Warrington Corporation Bill, 1923 ==
In 1923 a proposal was put before the British Parliament to flood 13,600 acres (55 km^{2}) of the area, to form a reservoir to provide water to the Corporation of Warrington, evicting the local farming and working population and completely obliterating the village of Tregeiriog. The water would, in part, have been used for Warrington's brewing industry. Opposers of the proposal, who were backed by a fund organised by the Western Mail newspaper, used the slogan "They want to take the "W" out of WALES and turn it into ALES".

The proposal was opposed by many Welsh MPs, including David Lloyd George, and was ultimately defeated.
