= Pandy, Ceiriog Valley =

Hamlet in Wrexham County Borough, Wales

Coordinates: 52.914716°N 3.198072°W

Pandy
- Hamlet
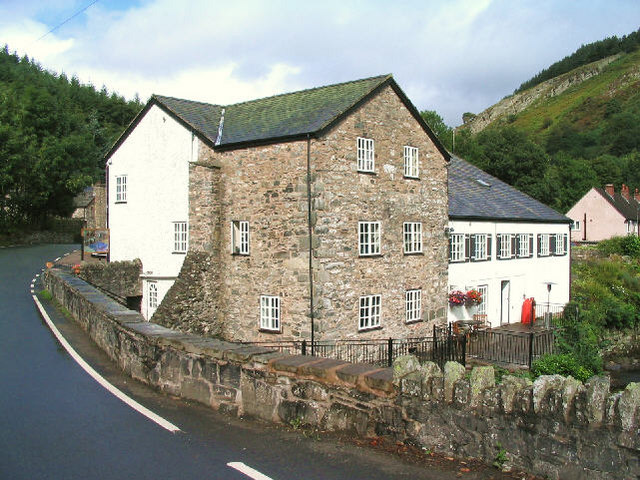
- A former fulling mill in the hamlet

- Location within Wrexham
- OS grid reference: SJ 1953 3592
- Community: Llansantffraid Glyn Ceiriog
- Principal area: Wrexham
- Preserved county: Clwyd
- Country: Wales
- Sovereign state: United Kingdom
- Post town: LLANGOLLEN
- Postcode district: LL20
- Dialling code: 01691
- Police: North Wales
- Fire: North Wales
- Ambulance: Welsh
- UK Parliament: Clwyd South
- Senedd Cymru – Welsh Parliament: Clwyd South

Pandy (Welsh pronunciation) is a hamlet in the Ceiriog Valley, Wrexham County Borough, Wales. It is located on the confluence of the River Ceiriog to the east, and the smaller River Teirw flowing from Nantyr moors to the north-west. The river level at Pandy of the River Ceiriog is ~665 feet (203 m), downstream from Llanarmon Dyffryn Ceiriog, and upstream from Glyn Ceiriog.

Pandy means "fulling mill" in Welsh. The hamlet is home to a fulling mill thought to be the oldest fulling mill in Wales. Dating to 1365, the mill was later converted into a pub known as the Woolpack Inn, also providing visitor accommodation, and until 2016, was home to the Pandy Mill Gallery, dedicated to glass art. Minerals were also extracted from the local Pandy area, including silica, dolerite, and China stone. Craig y Pandy (the Pandy crags) composed of Volcanic tuff overlooks the hamlet. The Glyn Valley Tramway used to pass the hamlet and was the main transport link of the hamlet, since superseded by the B4500 road which passes through the hamlet.

In November 2020, during a 17-day lockdown concerning the COVID-19 pandemic in Wales, the hamlet experienced very low broadband speeds with costs the expand fibre broadband considered expensive at the time.
