= Tregeiriog =

Village in Wrexham County Borough, Wales

Coordinates: 52.895°N 3.223°W

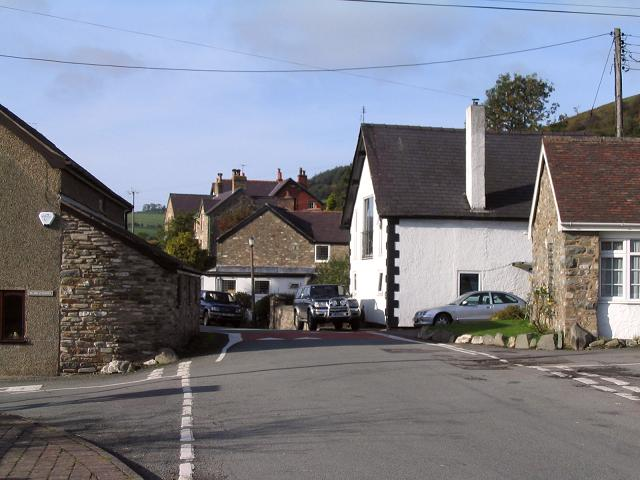
- Tregeiriog, in the community of Ceiriog Ucha

- Location within Wrexham
- OS grid reference: SJ177337
- Community: Ceiriog Ucha
- Principal area: Wrexham
- Country: Wales
- Sovereign state: United Kingdom
- Post town: LLANGOLLEN
- Postcode district: LL20
- Dialling code: 01691
- Police: North Wales
- Fire: North Wales
- Ambulance: Welsh
- UK Parliament: Clwyd South
- Senedd Cymru – Welsh Parliament: Clwyd South

Tregeiriog (a Welsh name translating roughly as "settlement [on the] River Ceiriog") is a village in Wrexham County Borough, Wales. It is in the community of Ceiriog Ucha on the B4500 road between Glyn Ceiriog and Llanarmon Dyffryn Ceiriog.

The Battle of Crogen, between Welsh forces under Owain Gwynedd and English forces under Henry II of England, took place near Tregeirog in 1165.

Richard Jones Berwyn (1838–1917), one of the founders of the Welsh settlement in Patagonia, was a native of the village.

Tregeiriog was formerly in the old ecclesiastical parish of Llangadwaladr, of which it was a detached township, surrounded by other parishes. The village of Tregeiriog and the surrounding area were transferred to the parish of Llanarmon Dyffryn Ceiriog in the late 1980s. Although the village had no church, there was formerly a small Calvinistic Methodist chapel in Tregeiriog.

Tregeiriog was also in the corresponding civil parish of Llangadwaladr; subsequent to the Local Government Act 1972 it was placed in the community of Ceiriog Ucha.

The cartographer Samuel Lewis, in his 1849 edition of A Topographical Dictionary of Wales, recorded that "the inhabitants have a tradition, that there were formerly a church and a considerable town at Tregeiriog; and in ploughing the land, quantities of large paving stones have been thrown up at different times, which seemed to have been placed in regular order: the name of a farm, Pen-yr-hôwl, the "head of the street," is also adduced in corroboration".
