= Brynkinalt =

Country house and estate near Chirk, Wales

Brynkinalt Hall
- Neuadd Bryncunallt (Welsh)
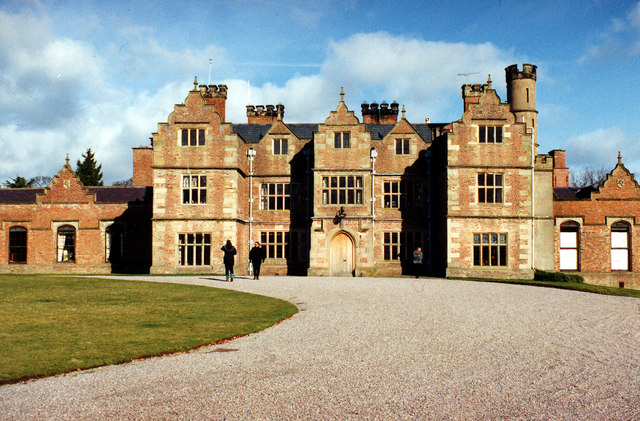
- Front of Brynkinalt Hall

- Location within Wrexham
- Alternative names: Brynkinallt Hall

General information
- Status: Private hall
- Type: Country house
- Architectural style: Classical architecture with Gothic modifications
- Location: Chirk, Wrexham County Borough, Wales (historically Denbighshire), Chirk, Wales
- Coordinates: 52.93475°N 3.03835°W
- Current tenants: Iain and Kate Hill-Trevor
- Completed: 1612
- Renovated: 1808
- Owner: Trevor family

Design and construction
- Architect: Inigo Jones (claimed)
- Designations: Grade II* listed building

Renovating team
- Architects: Charlotte, Viscountess Dungannon

Website
- brynkinalt.co.uk

Listed Building – Grade II*
- Official name: Brynkinallt Hall
- Designated: 20 October 1952; Amended 29 July 1998
- Reference no.: 599

Brynkinalt Hall (Welsh: Neuadd Bryncunallt; or simply Brynkinalt (Welsh: Bryncunallt) (Note: also spelled as Brynkinallt or Bryn-kinallt)) is a Grade-II* listed private property, built in 1612, near Chirk, Wrexham County Borough, Wales. The hall is surrounded by an estate including 1,000 acres (4.0 km^{2}) of agricultural land and 400 acres (1.6 km^{2}) of woodland. Part of the estate extends into Shropshire, England. Brynkinalt Park is a park located to the hall's north-west.

== History ==
The hall has been the home for the Trevor family, a major family of the County of Denbigh, with the area being their ancestral home since 942. The family are direct descendants of Tudur Trevor, King of Gloucester, and Angharad, daughter of Hywel Dda, King of Wales, but their roots claim to be traced further, to a marriage between Severa, daughter of Roman emperor, Maximus, and Gwrtheyrn Gwrtheneu, 82nd King of Britain, as well as a claimed link to Llywelyn the Great (Prince of Wales) and also the Kings of Ireland.

The three-storey Brynkinalt Great Hall, now forming the central section of the present-day hall, was completed in 1612, by Edward Trevor, the son of Robert Trevor and Katherine ap Llewellyn. The hall is said to be designed by Inigo Jones and was constructed using brick cut on site. The hall was part of an open courtyard, with coaches entering the site through the archway where the stairs now stand. The Jacobean Oak panelled Hall still remains, providing a look at what the original hall would have looked like.

In 1808, extensive remodelling was carried out on the hall, designed by Charlotte, Viscountess Dungannon. Two new extensive wings were added to the house, containing a large dining and drawing room, with their own antechamber, a small waiting room. Two small morning rooms ("boudoirs") and a conservatory (since removed) overlooking the Ceiriog Valley were also constructed. The hall was also modified with gothic architecture, with castellations and turrets added. Around the estate, numerous gate lodges, follies and a double-walled garden were also built.

From 1928, and delayed till the 1950s due to World War II, various additions added by Viscountess Dungannon in 1808 were reduced or removed, this includes the stucco (except in the east wing's end), and the larger service wing housing a kitchen at the rear were also removed.

The hall is linked to the Duke of Wellington, whose grandmother stayed in the hall. There are a pair of Musket balls, one British, one French, in the hall's dining room, brought in from the Battle of Waterloo.

The hall offers as a venue for weddings and other events. Brynkinalt is a Grade II* listed building.

The estate is, as of 2022, managed by Iain and Kate Hill-Trevor.

== Estate ==
The Brynkinalt Estate, first landscaped in the 17th century and extensively remodelled in 1808, spans 1,000 acres (4.0 km^{2}) of agricultural land, used mostly for rearing cattle, 400 acres (1.6 km^{2}) of forest, 21 miles (34 km) of hedgerows, and 8.7 miles (14 km) of public footpaths, as well as gardens. The estate is situated near the former Brynkinalt Colliery and the town of Chirk, on the other side of the A5.

The Brynkinalt Business Centre provides office space on the estate. There are also some residences on the estate. There is a historic church, Chirk's St Mary's parish church, present behind the hall.

A small commercial pheasant shooting club operates on the estate, with parties held in the hall. The estate describes the club to be operating based on "traditional values with countryside conservation at its core". The estate also partners with the Corwen and District Angling Club in management and conservation projects on the River Ceiriog. The estate also has a horse riding and carriage club. Accommodation on site is currently composed of seven en-suite bedrooms and one bedroom containing a private bathroom. The hall can accommodate sixteen guests for an overnight hall event.

In June 2021, the Hill-Trevors, donated 13.5 acres (55,000 m^{2}) of land to St Martin's Parish Council in Shropshire. The land, adjacent to St Martins School would be leased to the parish council on a 999-year lease with zero rent. The land would be used for education and community recreation, with plans including a multi-use sports pitch. The donation is part of a scheme involving the Morlas Meadows development of 80 homes of distinction on the estate.

The parks and gardens are listed as Grade II* in the Cadw/ICOMOS Register of Parks and Gardens of Special Historic Interest in Wales.

=== Farmland ===
The estate operates nearly 800 acres (3.2 km^{2}) of farmland, straddling the Wales-England border. This farmland is operated under an organic farming system under both English and Welsh Government rules, mainly for organic beef and dairy milk production. Cows on the estate are reared, cross bred, and milked. Cows graze throughout most of the year as possible, being fed on organic silage made on the estate during the winter months.

=== Woodlands ===
There are 400 acres (1.6 km^{2}) of woodlands on the estate, situated along the rivers Ceiriog and Dee, and within a Site of Special Scientific Interest. The majority of the woodland are a mixed hardwood forest, including trees such as oak and yew, which are harvested for timber to be used primarily as firewood or biomass.

As of 2022, the estate processes and sells 500 bags of logs annually. In the last five years, the estate has planted more than 10,000 trees.

==== Biomass ====
Brynkinalt Hall and the Brynkinalt Business Centre have been heated using biomass since 2008. Woodchips from the woodlands on the estate have been used as biomass. Therefore, the hall and centre have since been sustainably heated, with any trees felled replanted.

=== Gardens ===
The gardens on the estate consist of a formal west garden with formal beds and herbaceous borders, ornamental shrubbery (since 1905), and a walled garden. The small formal west garden contains fountains, statues, and sundials. These gardens fell into decline after World War II but have since been restored.

The gardens are part of the National Garden Scheme.

== Parkland ==
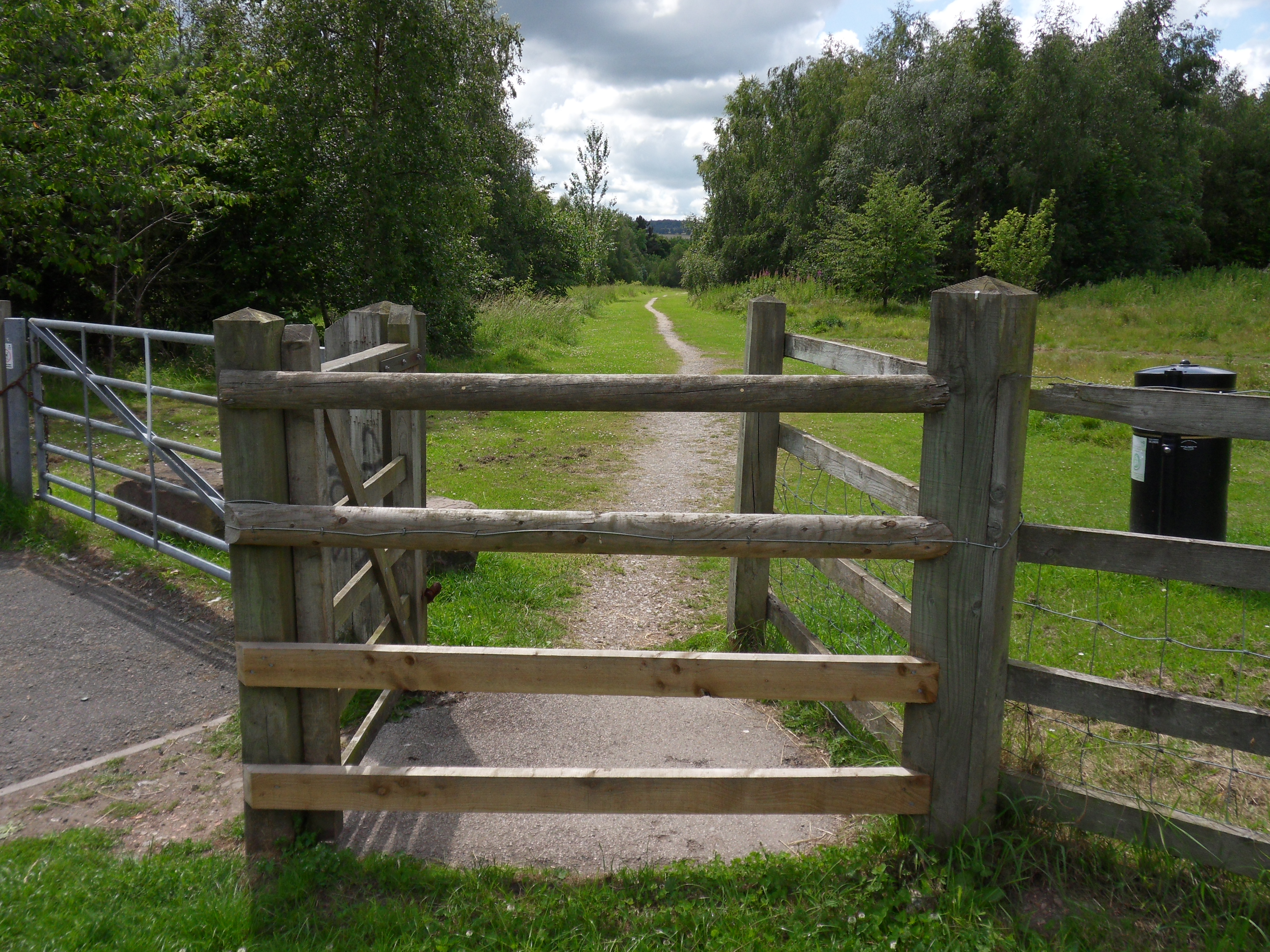
Brynkinalt Park, in Chirk

To the west of the estate is parkland, styled as "Brynkinalt Park" and operated by Wrexham council. It contains a large area of community woodland and informal open space. The woodlands contain wooded slopes, with planted native woodland and wildflower meadows. Situated on and around the former Brynkinalt Colliery, it is to the north-west of the hall on the other side of the A5 road. The area has some mining artefacts, such as a coal wagon and cutting disc. Prior to mining, the area was the Brynkinalt Home Farm. The park is not associated with the private estate.

== Events ==
The estate hosts the Brynkinalt Running Festival, which is organised into a 5 km (3.1 mi), 10 km (6.2 mi), and 20 km (12 mi) route around the estate.

Early in 2022 the mansion, outbuildings and grounds provided location for most of the scenes in the Netflix film, Lady Chatterley's Lover, released in November 2022.

== See also ==
- List of country houses in the United Kingdom
- Parks and open spaces in Wrexham
