= Llangadwaladr, Powys =

Coordinates: 52°51′52″N 3°13′01″W

Location of Llangadwaladr

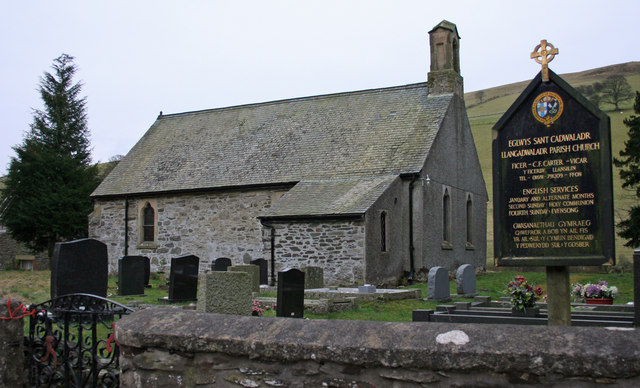
The remote parish church of Llangadwaladr on the slopes of Gyrn Moelfre.

Llangadwaladr (Welsh pronunciation), formerly spelt Llancadwaladr in some sources, is an isolated mountain parish in Powys, Wales. It was formerly in the historic county of Denbighshire, and from 1974 to 1996 was in Clwyd. Some 7 miles west of the nearest town, Oswestry, it covers an area of sparsely settled hill farming country around the valley of the Afon Ysgwennant beneath Gyrn Moelfre.

== History ==
The parish was originally a chapelry of Llanrhaeadr-ym-Mochnant, but was later formed into a separate parish, consisting of the township of Tre'r Llan, where the parish church was located, and those of Tregeiriog (the only village, in the neighbouring valley) and Nantyr, both of which were entirely detached from Tre'r Llan and surrounded by other parishes. Samuel Lewis's 1849 Topographical Dictionary of Wales described the parish as having 234 inhabitants and covering 2900 acres in total. In the late 1980s, Tregeiriog and its surrounding areas were transferred to the parish of Llanarmon Dyffryn Ceiriog.

There was a corresponding civil parish of Llangadwaladr, but following 1974 boundary and administrative changes, some of the area is now part of the civil community of Llansilin; the remaining parts of the civil parish are now in Ceiriog Ucha in Wrexham county borough.

Before the rural depopulation of the late 19th century, the area was almost exclusively Welsh-speaking. The 1891 census recorded that 99.5% of the inhabitants of Llangadwaladr parish spoke Welsh, and that 88% knew no English whatsoever. A correspondent in By-gones, relating to Wales and the Border Counties, stated that an elderly local had told him about a form of "mob" or "folk" football formerly played between the parishes of Llangadwaladr and Llanarmon Dyffryn Ceiriog, where the opposing teams would "contend from morning even until night, and sometimes [...] fresh help would be fetched up in the evening".

== St Cadwaladr's church ==
The Church in Wales parish church is dedicated to Cadwaladr Fendigaid and was mentioned as "Bettws Kadwaladr" as early as 1291. It is sheltered by yew trees, some of which are 1000 years old. Some of its current fabric dates from the 15th century, with major alterations made in 1883 by W. H. Spaull of Oswestry: a re-set mediaeval window survives in the vestry.

Lewis noted that St Cadwaladr's church possessed a "very elegant set of communion plate" presented by Sir John Trevor of Brynkinallt.

=== Robert Williams ===
The Rev. Robert Williams (1810–1881), author of the Lexicon Cornu-Britannicum, the first Cornish-English dictionary, was the vicar of Llangadwaladr from 1837 to 1879 and perpetual curate of Rhydycroesau from 1838 to 1879. A native of Conwy, where his father was Vicar, he was educated at Christ Church, Oxford, graduating MA, and was appointed a Cursal Canon of St Asaph Cathedral in 1872. In 1879 he became Rector of Culmington, near Ludlow, in Herefordshire, where he died and was buried in the churchyard in 1881. His gravestone is the only one there made of slate; it has a Welsh and Cornish inscription and was provided by public subscription in 1899.
