= Glyn Ceiriog =

Village and community in Wrexham County Borough, Wales

(Llansantffraid) Glyn Ceiriog: Welsh: (Llansanffraid) Glynceiriog
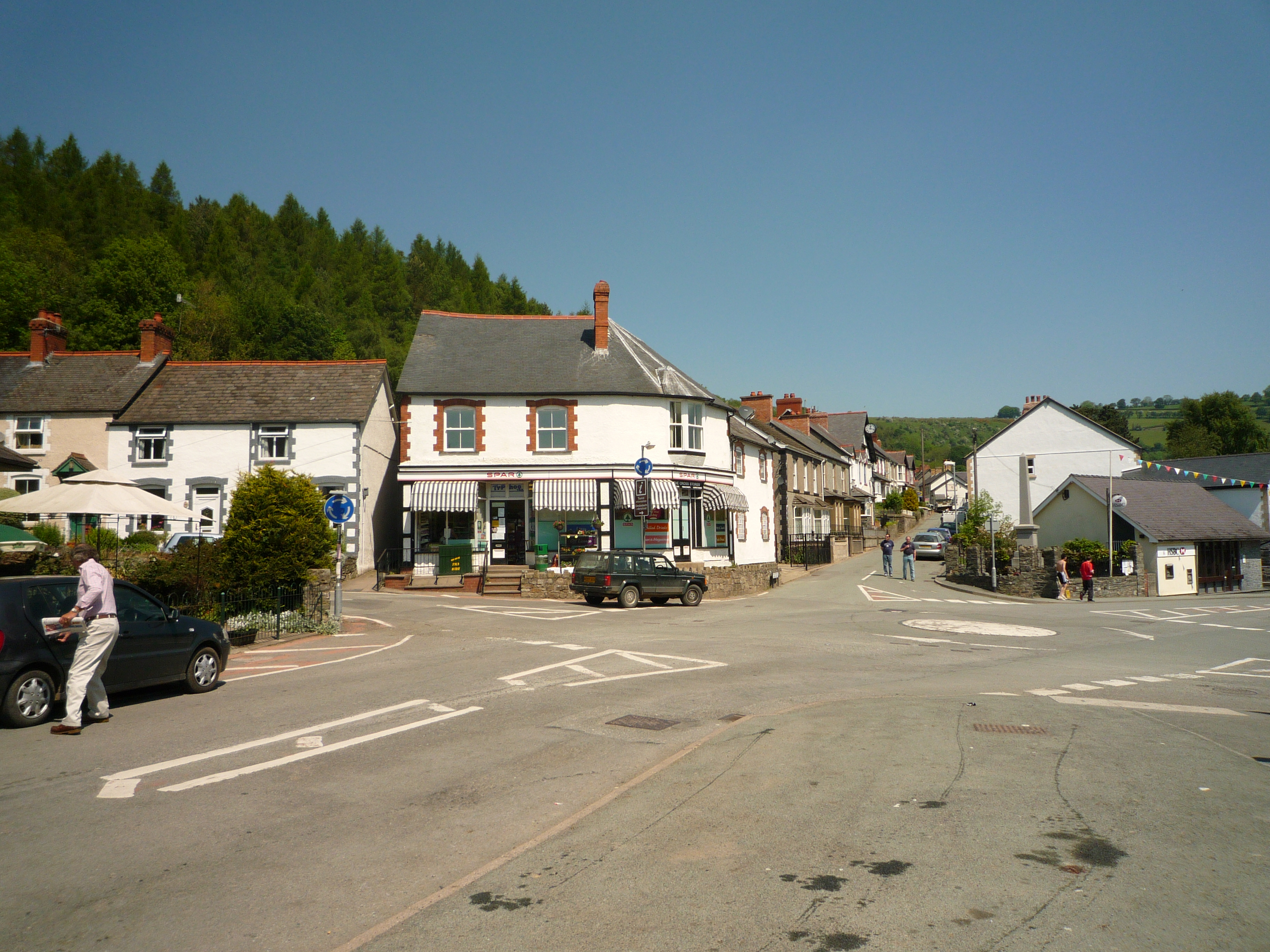
- Centre of Glyn Ceiriog, view from the Glyn Valley Hotel

- Location within Wrexham
- Population: 1,040 (2011)
- Language: English; Welsh (48.3% of population)
- OS grid reference: SJ205384
- Community: Llansanffraid Glyn Ceiriog
- Principal area: Wrexham
- Preserved county: Clwyd
- Country: Wales
- Sovereign state: United Kingdom
- Post town: LLANGOLLEN
- Postcode district: LL20
- Dialling code: 01691
- Police: North Wales
- Fire: North Wales
- Ambulance: Welsh
- UK Parliament: Montgomeryshire and Glyndŵr
- Senedd Cymru – Welsh Parliament: Clwyd South
- Website: glynceiriog.org.uk
- List of places UK Wales Wrexham 52.937°N 3.183°W Map of the community

Glyn Ceiriog (Welsh: Glynceiriog) is the principal settlement of the Ceiriog Valley and a community in Wrexham County Borough, north-east Wales. Glyn Ceiriog translates simply as Ceiriog Valley, though there are other villages in the valley. The village and community is technically known, in traditional Welsh naming style, as Llansantffraid Glyn Ceiriog or sometimes Llansanffraid Glyn Ceiriog, which means church of St Ffraid (the Welsh name of Saint Brigid of Kildare) in the Ceiriog Valley, but it has come to be known simply as Glyn Ceiriog, or even Glyn for short. The name Llansanffraid is now more associated with other villages of the same name.

It is in the Clwyd South Senedd constituency and the Montgomeryshire and Glyndŵr UK parliamentary constituency.

A former slate mining village, it lies on the River Ceiriog and on the B4500 road, about 6 miles (10 km) west of Chirk. It is south of Llangollen.

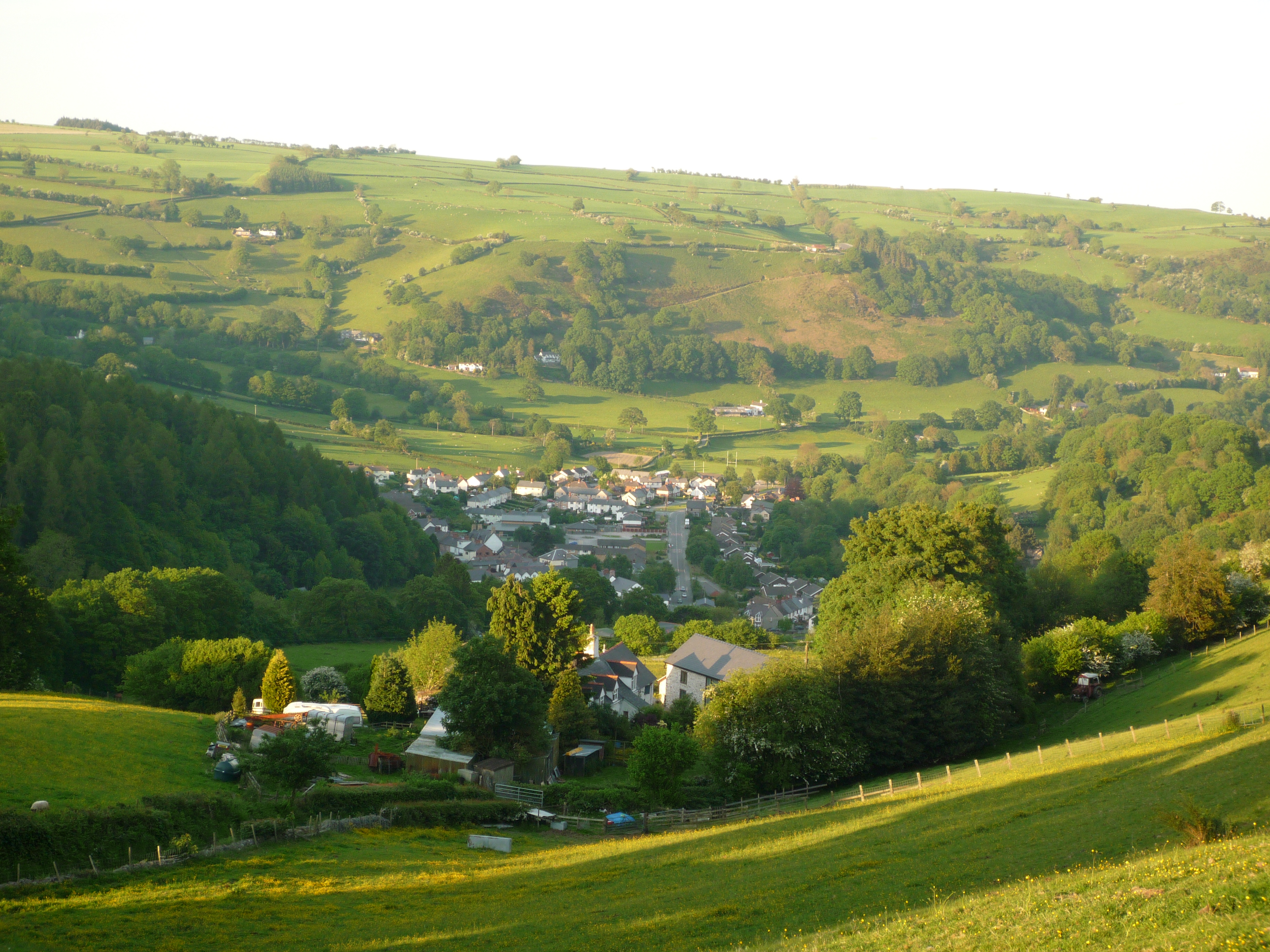
Glyn Ceiriog Village

== Geography and administration ==
=== Civic history ===
Glyn Ceiriog was historically administered as the civil parish of Llansantffraid Glyn Ceiriog, ("St Ffraid's in the Ceiriog Valley"). From 1889 until 1974, Glyn Ceiriog was part of the administrative county of Denbighshire, which was divided into various rural districts. From 1895 to 1935, Glyn Ceiriog was in the Chirk Rural District, which merged in 1935 with Llansilin Rural District to form the Ceiriog Rural District. Glyn Ceiriog was in the Ceiriog Rural District from 1935 to 1974.

In 1974, Denbighshire was abolished as an administrative county, and Glyn Ceiriog was incorporated into the Glyndŵr district of the new county of Clwyd. Both of those were dissolved in 1996, and Glyn Ceiriog became a part of the new unitary authority of Wrexham County Borough, in which it currently remains.

=== Political representation ===
Today, Glyn Ceiriog is administered by Wrexham County Borough Council, is in the Ceiriog Valley electoral ward, and has an independent councillor.

The Llansantffraid Glyn Ceiriog Community Council meets every fourth Thursday in the month. Ten councillors represent the villages of Glyn Ceiriog, Garth, Pandy and Nantyr.

Since 2011, Glyn Ceiriog has been represented in the Senedd by Ken Skates, the Welsh Labour Member of the Senedd for Clwyd South.

From 2010 to 2019, Glyn Ceiriog was represented in the Parliament of the United Kingdom by Susan Jones, the Labour Party member of parliament for Clwyd South. From 2019 to 2024 it was represented by Simon Baynes of the Conservative Party.

Following the 2023 review of Westminster constituencies the village became part of the Montgomeryshire and Glyndŵr constituency. Since the July 2024 it has been represented by Steve Witherden of the Labour Party.

=== Physical geography/Geology ===
Glyn Ceiriog is located in the Ceiriog Valley, a valley created by the River Ceiriog. Geologically, the area has Ordovician and Silurian strata. The soil is thin and peaty.

== Village resources ==
Glyn Ceiriog, being the principal village for the Ceiriog Valley, is home to many of the Valley’s resources:

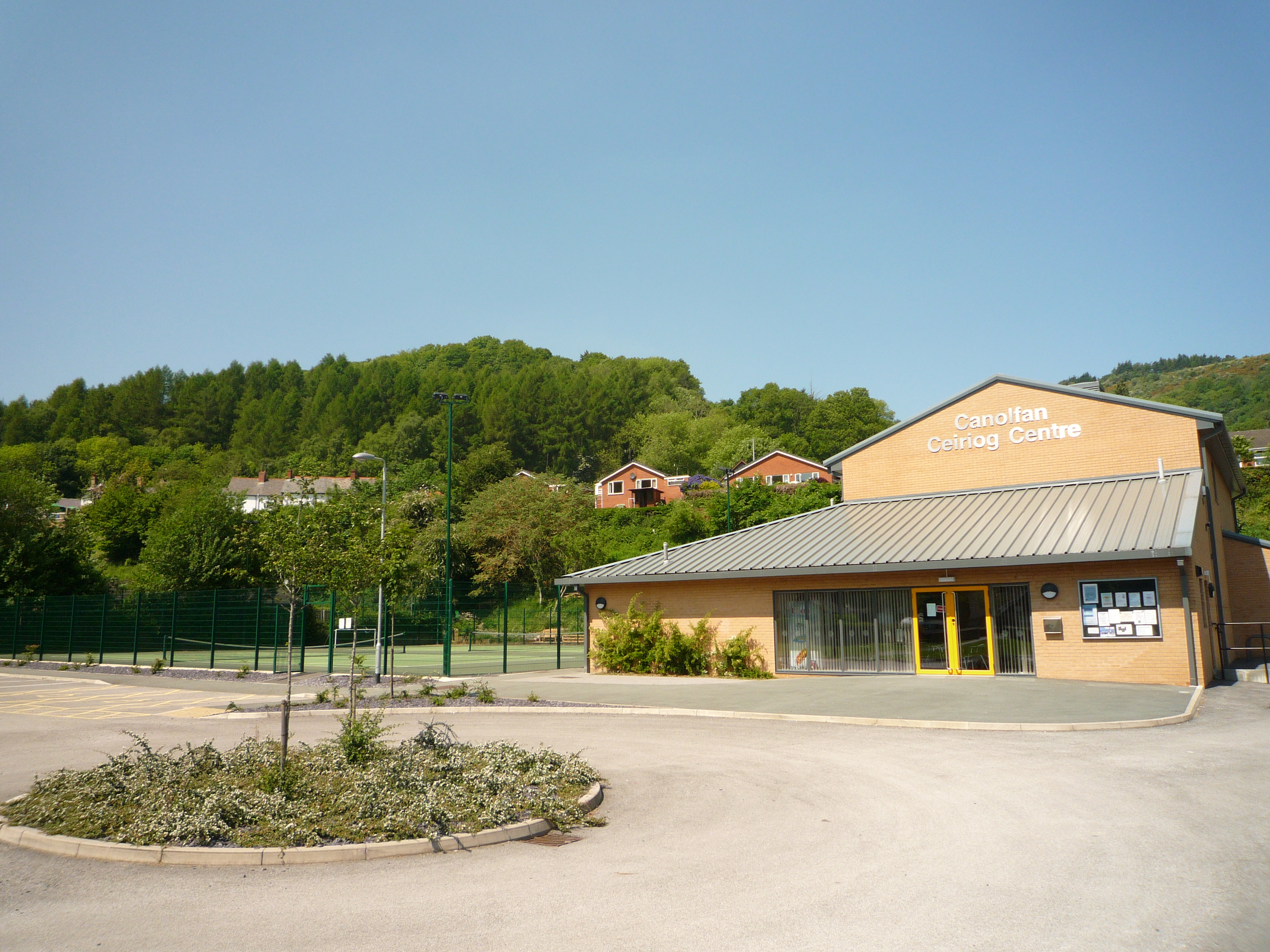
Canolfan Ceiriog Centre

• Village Post Office
• Cross Stores Village Shop
• Glyn Valley Hotel
• The Oak / Y Dderwen
• Valley Doctors Surgery
• Valley Pharmacy
• Christian Centre
• Ceiriog Memorial Hall
• Llansanffraid Church

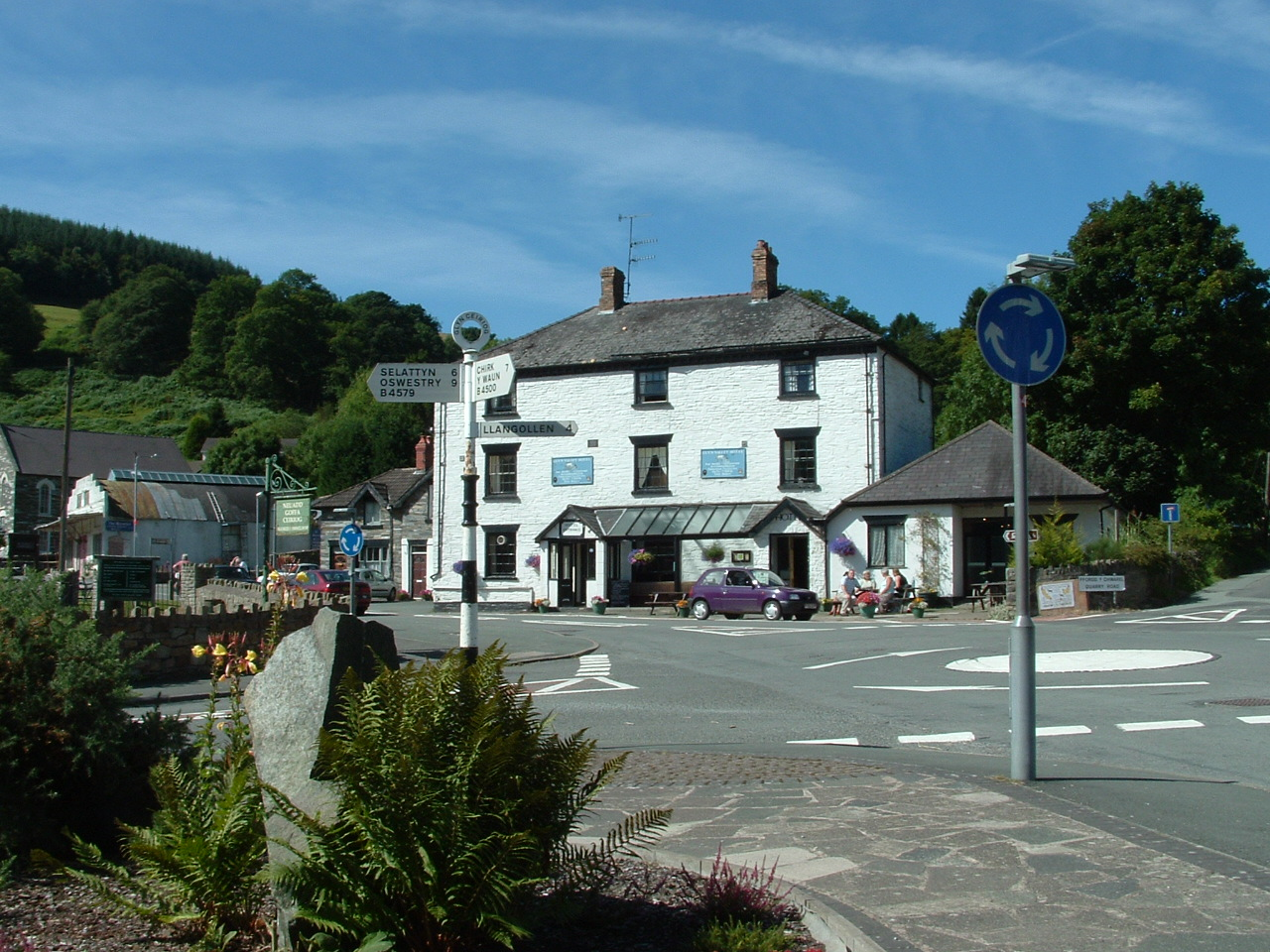
Glyn Valley Hotel

=== Industry ===
Glyn Ceiriog was once the home of extensive slate quarries. The Glyn Valley Tramway was built to take the slate to a wharf on the Shropshire Union Canal and later to sidings on the Great Western Railway line from Chester to Shrewsbury.

Although the valley does not have a primary industry any longer, there are a few recent and long standing manufacturing businesses supplying the valley and beyond.

=== Transport ===
Bus services are provided by Bryn Melyn, a subsidiary of GHA Coaches. Services operate to Llangollen via Chirk and to Llanarmon Dyffryn Ceiriog on service 64. Infrequent services on route 65 connect the village to Wrexham via Ruabon.

Rail services are available from Chirk, 5 mi (8.0 km) away.

== Notable residents ==
A number of Welsh literary figures have lived in or near Glyn Ceiriog.

- The 15th century Welsh poet Guto'r Glyn (1435–1493) is associated with Glyn Ceiriog
- The 17th century Welsh poet Huw Morus (1622–1709) was born near Glyn Ceiriog and lived at Pont Y Meibion.
- The Eisteddfod prize-winning poet and lexicographer, Robert Ellis (Cynddelw) (1812–1875) was a Baptist minister at Glyn Ceiriog Independent Welsh Baptist Chapel, Seion, from 1838 to 1840
- The Welsh novelist Islwyn Ffowc Elis spent most of his childhood on a farm near Glyn Ceiriog, although he was born in Wrexham.
- The actress Sarah Edwards was born in Glyn Ceirog in 1882.
- Lancelot Hogben, an experimental zoologist and medical statistician, moved to the Ceiriog Valley in the late 1950s, and lived in Glyn Ceiriog at the time of his death in 1975.

== Bibliography ==
- Dewi Parry Jones & Robert Owen Jones, "100 Years in the Valley – Y Glyn a Fu" (1998)
- Dewi Parry Jones & Robert Owen Jones, "100 Years in the Valley Volume II – Y Glyn a Fu" (1999)
