= Grade II listed buildings in Ceiriog Ucha =

Map of the community in Wrexham County Borough.

In the United Kingdom, the term listed building refers to a building or other structure officially designated as being of special architectural, historical, or cultural significance; Grade II structures are those considered to be "buildings of special interest which justify every effort being made to preserve them". Listing was begun by a provision in the Town and Country Planning Act 1947. Once listed, strict limitations are imposed on the modifications allowed to a building's structure or fittings. In Wales, the authority for listing under the Planning (Listed Buildings and Conservation Areas) Act 1990 rests with Cadw.

This is a list of the 29 Grade II listed buildings in the community of Ceiriog Ucha, in Wrexham County Borough.

Name	Location Grid Ref. (Note: Sometimes known as OSGB36, the grid reference is based on the British national grid reference system used by the Ordnance Survey.) Geo-coordinates	Date Listed	Type/Function	Notes	Reference Number	Image
Blaen-Cwm-Llawenog	Ceiriog Ucha; SJ1037634639; 52.901689°N 3.3338854°W	23 May 2003	Recreational		81160	–
Building at former Powder Works, Hendre Quarry	Ceiriog Ucha; SJ1941035026; 52.9066°N 3.199707°W	23 May 2003			81166	–
Cart-shed and granary to W of Ty-du Farmhouse	Ceiriog Ucha; SJ1844534011; 52.897332°N 3.2137966°W	23 May 2003	Domestic		81163	–
Church of St Garmon	Ceiriog Ucha; SJ1583732803; 52.886073°N 3.2522428°W	23 May 2003	Industrial		81150	–
Cow-house with adjoining cart-shed S of Fodwen	Ceiriog Ucha; SJ1616134524; 52.901591°N 3.2478731°W	23 May 2003	Religious, Ritual and Funerary		81157	–
Farm Building to SE of Hendre Farmhouse	Ceiriog Ucha; SJ1891334320; 52.90018°N 3.2069185°W	04 January 1966	Domestic		649	–
Farm Building to the S of Pont y Meibion Farmhouse	Ceiriog Ucha; SJ1946835224; 52.908388°N 3.1988939°W	04 January 1966	Domestic		647	–
Fodwen	Ceiriog Ucha; SJ1616334565; 52.901959°N 3.247854°W	23 May 2003	Domestic		81156	–
Hafod Adams	Ceiriog Ucha; SJ1645233968; 52.896639°N 3.2434049°W	20 October 1952	Domestic		603	–
Hendre	Ceiriog Ucha; SJ1888834342; 52.900374°N 3.2072956°W	04 January 1966	Commercial		648	–
Llan-gau	Ceiriog Ucha; SJ1459331260; 52.872009°N 3.2703202°W	23 May 2003	Domestic		81153	–
Milestone to NE of Llanarmon Dyffryn Ceiriog	Ceiriog Ucha; SJ1583632973; 52.887601°N 3.2523017°W	23 May 2003			81152	–
Milestone to W of Tregeiriog	Ceiriog Ucha; SJ1722733661; 52.894°N 3.231809°W	23 May 2003	Domestic		81167	–
Monument to Huw Morys, including boundary walls and gate	Ceiriog Ucha; SJ1948935235; 52.90849°N 3.1985845°W	23 May 2003	Domestic		81165	–
Old Mill Welsh Shop	Ceiriog Ucha; SJ1565732818; 52.88618°N 3.254921°W	23 May 2003	Commercial		81151	–
Pen y bryn	Ceiriog Ucha; SJ1587433245; 52.890051°N 3.2518075°W	23 May 2003	Domestic		81158	–
Pentre Bach	Ceiriog Ucha; SJ1356034780; 52.903479°N 3.2865997°W	23 May 2003	Commercial		81159	–
Pont Ricket	Ceiriog Ucha; SJ1877334267; 52.899682°N 3.208986°W	04 January 1966	Industrial		650	–
Pont y Felin	Ceiriog Ucha; SJ1773933546; 52.893045°N 3.2241712°W	04 January 1966	Domestic		651	–
Pont y Meibion	Ceiriog Ucha; SJ1957335114; 52.907415°N 3.1973058°W	20 October 1952	Domestic		614	–
Pontricket Farmhouse	Ceiriog Ucha; SJ1857734188; 52.898943°N 3.2118793°W	23 May 2003	Domestic		81161	–
Secondary Dwelling at Hafod Adams	Ceiriog Ucha; SJ1644333959; 52.896557°N 3.2435363°W	23 May 2003	Agriculture and Subsistence		81154	–
Service Building to E of Ty-du Farmhouse	Ceiriog Ucha; SJ1846234044; 52.897631°N 3.2135523°W	23 May 2003	Domestic		81164	–
Small Barn at Hendre	Ceiriog Ucha; SJ1891534334; 52.900306°N 3.2068923°W	04 November 2003	Transport		81857	–
Stone Seat of Huw Morys at Erw Gerrig Farmhouse	Ceiriog Ucha; SJ1947535453; 52.910447°N 3.1988467°W	30 August 1985	Industrial		1312	–
Telephone Call-box adjacent to W gable end of Hand Inn	Ceiriog Ucha; SJ1569232815; 52.886158°N 3.2544002°W	11 May 1990			1332	–
The West Arms Hotel	Ceiriog Ucha; SJ1571032859; 52.886556°N 3.2541442°W	22 October 1980	Agriculture and Subsistence		1305	–
Ty-du	Ceiriog Ucha; SJ1845434031; 52.897513°N 3.2136679°W	23 May 2003	Domestic		81162	–
Ty'n y rhos	Ceiriog Ucha; SJ1567034375; 52.900175°N 3.2551322°W	23 May 2003	Domestic		81155	–

== See also ==
- Grade II listed buildings in Wrexham County Borough
- Grade II listed buildings in Llansantffraid Glyn Ceiriog
