= Battle of Crogen =

Engagement said to have taken place in Wales during Henry II of England

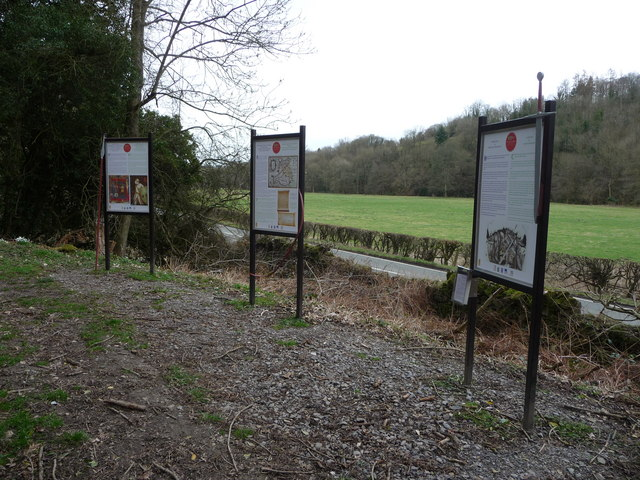
- Interpretation boards close to a possible site of the battlefield
Date	August 1165
Location	Ceiriog Valley, north-east Wales 52.939°N 3.104°W
Result	Stalemate; English Retreat

Belligerents
Deheubarth; Gwynedd; Powys Wenwynwyn; Mochnant	England

Commanders and leaders
Owain Gwynedd; Rhys ap Gruffydd	Henry II

Strength
Unknown	Unknown, but said to be a large army

Casualties and losses
Unknown	Unknown

The Battle of Crogen is an engagement said to have taken place in Wales during Henry II of England's summer 1165 campaign against an alliance of Welsh princedoms led by Owain Gwynedd. Later Welsh chronicles recorded that a detachment of Welsh troops inflicted a number of casualties on the Anglo-Norman army in the Ceiriog Valley; Henry subsequently abandoned the campaign after an attempt to cross the Berwyn Mountains was thwarted by severe weather.

It is unclear whether events in the Ceiriog Valley represented a pitched battle, a series of smaller engagements or a minor skirmish: all three have been argued, as well as the possibility no fighting took place during the 1165 campaign. It has been suggested that the idea of a "battle" should be considered as folklore rather than as a genuine historical event. There are few contemporary accounts: 19th century and later accounts of the "battle" rely heavily on David Powel's 1584 Historie of Cambria, an unreliable historical source.

== Background ==
Anglo-Norman involvement in Wales was centred on a number of Marcher Lordships set up by William the Conqueror. These had considerable legal independence: Marcher barons could hold their own courts and had a licence to crenellate. The Crown sought to strengthen the position of the Marcher Lords against the native Welsh princes, and in July 1163 several of the princes were compelled to do homage to Henry II at Woodstock, giving guarantees for their peaceful conduct.

Henry II began planning a punitive campaign into Wales in 1164, ostensibly to take action against several Welsh princes, particularly Rhys ap Gruffudd of Deheubarth, who had been responsible for disturbances along the border in breach of the 1163 settlement. Welsh chronicles of the time argued that Henry's Marcher Lords, particularly Roger de Clare, 2nd Earl of Hertford, had themselves failed to keep to the terms of the agreement. Rhys had used Roger's actions as a pretext to continue his conflict with the Normans, attacking the castles of Mabwynion and Aberrheidol and overrunning much of Ceredigion. Owain ap Gruffydd of Gwynedd was in open rebellion by autumn 1164 and sent several letters to Henry's main rival, Louis VII of France, asking to be considered amongst Louis' "faithful and devoted friends". The Welsh annals spoke of a concerted effort by the Welsh princedoms, which were more usually in competition with each other, to "throw off the rule of the French [i.e. the Angevins]".

In early 1165 Owain Gwynedd's son Dafydd ravaged the cantref of Tegeingl, threatening the Norman castles at Rhuddlan, Basingwerk and Prestatyn. Henry returned from Normandy in May. During the summer of 1165 he assembled a substantial force at Shrewsbury, including troops from England and mercenaries from the Continent: several contemporary chronicles emphasised the large size of the Angevin army. Henry's overall objectives in the campaign are uncertain; Welsh annals alleged that he planned a complete conquest of the Welsh princedoms, but a more likely interpretation is that he sought the submission of Rhys and Owain and a settlement with more effective guarantees than in 1163.

The reason for Henry's choice of route into Wales is similarly unclear, as it led initially into the minor princedoms of northern Powys, which had not been in conflict with him. Shrewsbury was not the most convenient base for a campaign against either Rhys or Owain: it may have been selected in order to be able to advance northward or southward as the campaign required. Henry's subsequent advance towards Oswestry and the Ceiriog Valley may indicate that a decision had been made to attack Owain Gwynedd first. In response Owain raised an army at Corwen in the cantref of Penllyn, comprising forces from several princedoms. Including his own forces, led by himself and his brother Cadwaladr, the alliance was made up of men from Deheubarth under the leadership of Rhys ap Gruffydd, troops from Mochnant in northern Powys under Iorwerth Goch ap Maredudd and from southern Powys under Owain Cyfeiliog, although the latter had been on good terms with Henry until that point. Powysian involvement in the alliance may have been less than enthusiastic, particularly as Gwynedd had recently overrun Powysian lands in Penllyn, and it is possible that Henry hoped a show of Angevin strength would encourage the lords of Powys back under his protection.

== The battle ==
Contemporary sources are patchy and conflicting, and there has been a great deal of disagreement over events during the campaign. Some scholars, such as Austin Lane Poole, have concluded that no fighting actually took place at all in 1165.

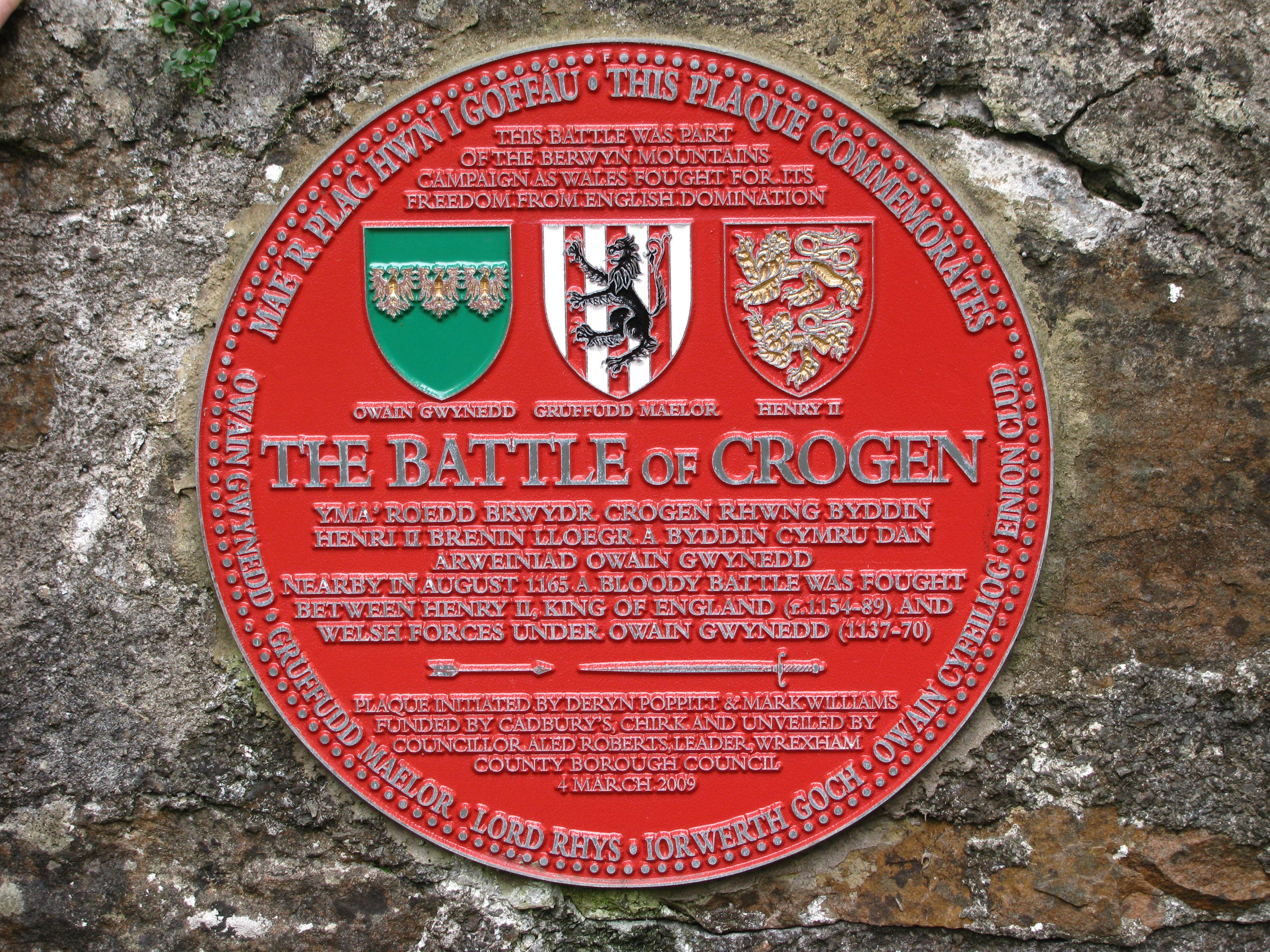
Red plaque of the Battle of Crogen, unveiled in 2009; it has been suggested that the engagement might be better regarded as a "series of minor harassments" than a single battle.

The main reasonably contemporary source for events in the Ceiriog Valley is the Brut y Tywysogion, which was based on now-lost materials contemporary with the battle. After describing Henry's arrival at Oswestry and Owain's at Corwen, it states:

after staying long in their tents there without the one daring to attack the other, [the king] moved his host into the wood of Dyffryn Ceiriog, and had the wood cut down and felled to the ground. And there a few picked Welshmen, who knew not how to suffer defeat, manfully encountered him in the absence of their leaders. And many of the doughtiest fell on both sides. And then the king, and the advanced forces along with him, encamped on the Berwyn Mountains.

Henry II had ordered woodsmen to clear trees from the area, allowing his forces to move more freely through the pass, or perhaps in an attempt to force the Welsh into open battle. The Welsh chronicles suggest Henry's army was ambushed, possibly close to a gap in Offa's Dyke, by Welsh skirmishers, who inflicted a number of casualties. The more detailed account given by Powel in 1584 claimed that the skirmish happened while Henry and his main army "laie at Oswestry" and involved only a group "sent to trie the passages". It is unknown what sources Powel used for his information; he may have had access to oral traditions or manuscripts now lost.

The Gwynedd chronicle O Oes Gwrtheyrn Gwrtheneu located this engagement at a place called "Coed Ceiriog"; Powel, writing several centuries later, was the first to identify it taking place at a narrow gap in "Offa's ditch, at the castle of Crogen". The name "Battle of Crogen" first appeared in 1778 in an account by Thomas Pennant: "This conflict is sometimes called the battle of Corwen; but with more propriety that of Crogen: for it happened beneath Castell Crogen, the present Chirk Castle". More recent scholarship has confirmed that the medieval "Castell Crogen" was in fact near Llandderfel: Pennant may have confused the name with the townships of Crogen Iddon and Crogen Wladys in the Ceiriog Valley.

Some modern sources repeat a story that Hubert de St Clare, the Constable of Colchester Castle, sacrificed his own life when he threw himself in front of an arrow meant for Henry. This event in fact happened at the siege of Bridgnorth in 1155, the source of the confusion again being Powel, who inserted a passage from Holinshed's Chronicles into his account.

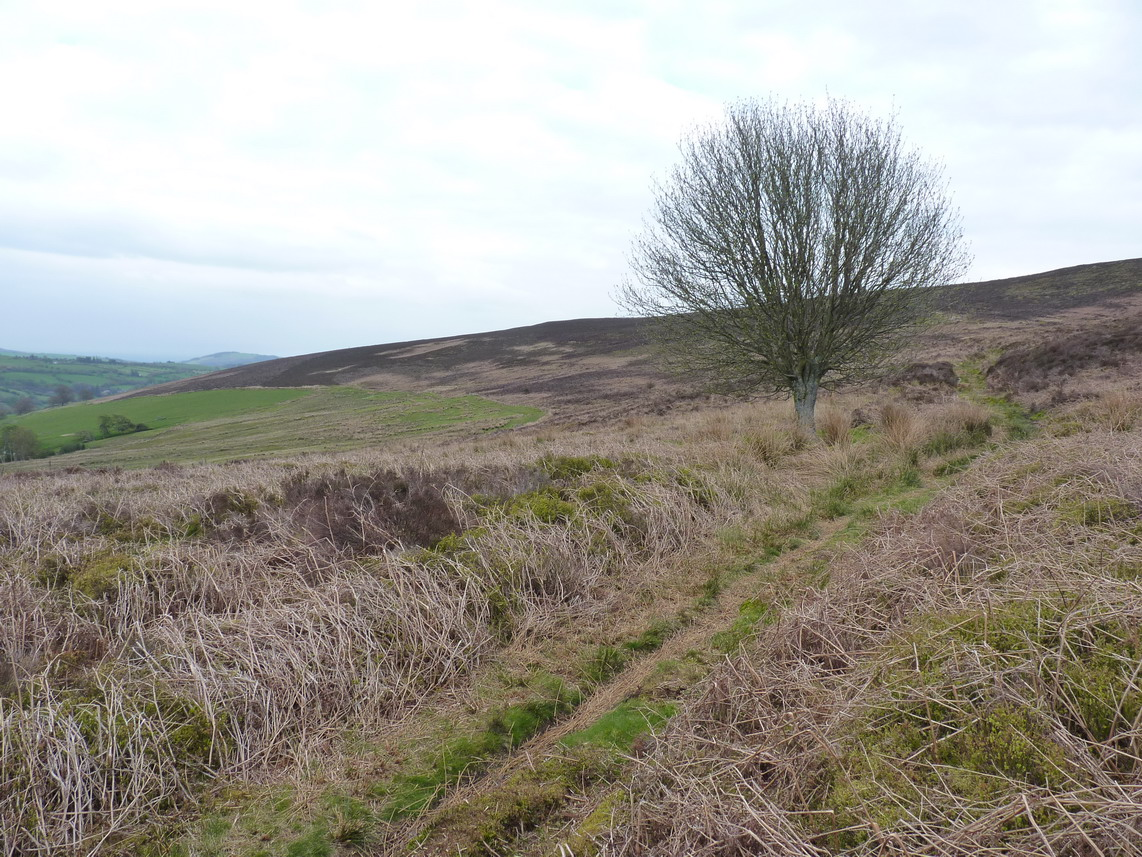
Ffordd y Saeson, the ancient trackway above Tregeiriog along which Henry II's army was said to have attempted to reach Corwen in August 1165.

Undeterred by their losses in the Ceiriog Valley, Henry's army continued into the Berwyns, possibly making for Corwen via a pass still known as the "English Road" (Ffordd y Saeson). While the mountains appeared easily passable in summer a spell of high winds and torrential rain, which made resupply impossible and caused men to start dying of exposure, forced Henry to retreat within a matter of days without bringing the main Welsh force to battle. The Brut y Tywysogion said that the army retreated after being "oppressed by a mighty tempest of wind and exceeding great torrents of rain": Henry's supporter Gerald of Wales, in his Itinerarium Cambriae, gave the same story but added that Henry had also made the mistake of failing to listen to his local advisors.

== Aftermath ==
Estimates of the losses suffered at Crogen vary; most modern historians consider them to have been relatively light. The place where the skirmishes occurred is called Adwy'r Beddau, "the Gap of the Graves": the dead were said to have been buried in the fosse of Offa's Dyke, at a spot where an account of 1697 claimed that graves were still visible.

His attempt to deal with Owain and Rhys a failure, Henry returned to Shrewsbury and there ordered the blinding of twenty-two hostages held since the 1163 treaty, two of whom were Owain's sons. He then moved his army to Chester: the Welsh annals claimed that this was in order to wait for a fleet from Dublin, with whose rulers Henry had recently entered into a treaty, but rather than continuing his campaign he abandoned the plan completely and returned to his court at Anjou. The collapse of such a well-financed and planned campaign was a considerable humiliation to Henry and an encouragement to his political opponents. Despite this, he was back on good terms with the princes of Powys within a year; both Owain Cyfeiliog and Iorwerth Goch were in friendly contact with Henry's court within months.

By the following year, both Rhys ap Gruffydd and Owain Gwynedd had resumed attacks on the lands of the Norman marcher barons; Henry withdrew much of his support from the latter by the end of the decade, turning to diplomacy to deal with Gwynedd and Deheubarth. Rhys later met personally with Henry, and was within a few years confirmed in his possession of lands previously occupied by the Normans: he even later sent troops to aid Henry in Normandy, in effect becoming "one of the great feudatories of the Angevin empire". It has been suggested that Henry's lack of support for the marcher barons after 1165 ultimately encouraged them to seek lands and opportunities elsewhere, contributing substantially to the subsequent Norman invasion of Ireland.
