= Denbighshire (historic) =

Historic county in Wales

Denbighshire Sir Ddinbych (Welsh)
- Historic county
- 1536–1974
- Area
  - 1831: 386,052 acres (1,562.30 km^{2})
  - 1911: 426,084 acres (1,724.30 km^{2})
  - 1961: 427,978 acres (1,731.97 km^{2})
- Population
  - 1831: 83,629
  - 1911: 144,783
  - 1961: 174,151
- Density
  - 1831: 0.2/acre
  - 1911: 0.3/acre
  - 1961: 0.4/acre
- Status: Non-administrative county (1536–1889); Administrative county (1889–1974); Historic county (non-administrative)
- Chapman code: DEN
- Government: Denbighshire County Council (1889–1974)
  - HQ: Denbigh and Ruthin
- History
  - Established: 1536
  - Council established: 1889
  - Disestablished: 1974
Succeeded by
Clwyd; Gwynedd

Denbighshire (Welsh: Sir Ddinbych), or the County of Denbigh, was one of the thirteen counties of Wales that existed from 1536 until their abolition in 1974. Located in the north of Wales, it was created by the Laws in Wales Acts 1535, enacted in 1536, by combining several marcher lordships. Denbighshire was a maritime county, with a coast to the north onto the Irish Sea. It was named after its original county town of Denbigh. Other towns included Abergele, Colwyn Bay, Llangollen, Llanrwst, Ruthin and Wrexham. The central part of the county included much of the Vale of Clwyd. The neighbouring counties (clockwise from east) were Flintshire, Cheshire, Shropshire, Montgomeryshire, Merionethshire, and Caernarfonshire.

Under the Local Government Act 1972, the use of Denbighshire for local government and ceremonial purposes ended on 1 April 1974, with the creation of the new county of Clwyd. A different county of the same name was created on 1 April 1996, for modern local government purposes, covering a substantially different area from the historic county.

== History ==
=== Origins ===
The area which became Denbighshire had historically been divided into multiple cantrefi under the control of various Welsh rulers. The area was fought over by English and Welsh rulers between the 11th and 13th centuries. Following the Conquest of Wales by Edward I, the area was divided into marcher lordships in 1284 under the Statute of Rhuddlan. The lordships were then controlled by English lords and subordinate to the English monarchs, but were not formally part of England nor subject to English law. Under the Laws in Wales Act 1535, the marcher lordships and the pre-existing Welsh counties were formally incorporated into the Kingdom of England, and the marcher lordships were grouped into counties with effect from 1 November 1536. Denbighshire was one of the new counties, and was defined in the act as "the lordships, townships, parishes, commotes and cantreds" of:

- Denbighland (the Lordship of Denbigh)
- Ruthin (also known as Dyffryn Clwyd)
- 'St Tasse' (i.e. St Asaph)
- Kinllethowen (or Cynllaith)
- Bromfield (or Welsh Maelor)
- Yale (Iâl)
- Chirk and Chirkland
- Molesdale (or Moldsdale, being the lordship around Mold)
- Hopesdale (the lordship around Hope)

The borders of the new county were challenged by certain landowners, notably Edward Stanley, 3rd Earl of Derby, whose lands were split between Denbighshire and Flintshire. Following petitions to Henry VIII, the county boundaries were revised in 1542 to transfer St Asaph, Moldsdale and Hopesdale to Flintshire, along with the manors of Marford and Hoseley, which formed part of Bromfield but were also owned by the Earl of Derby.

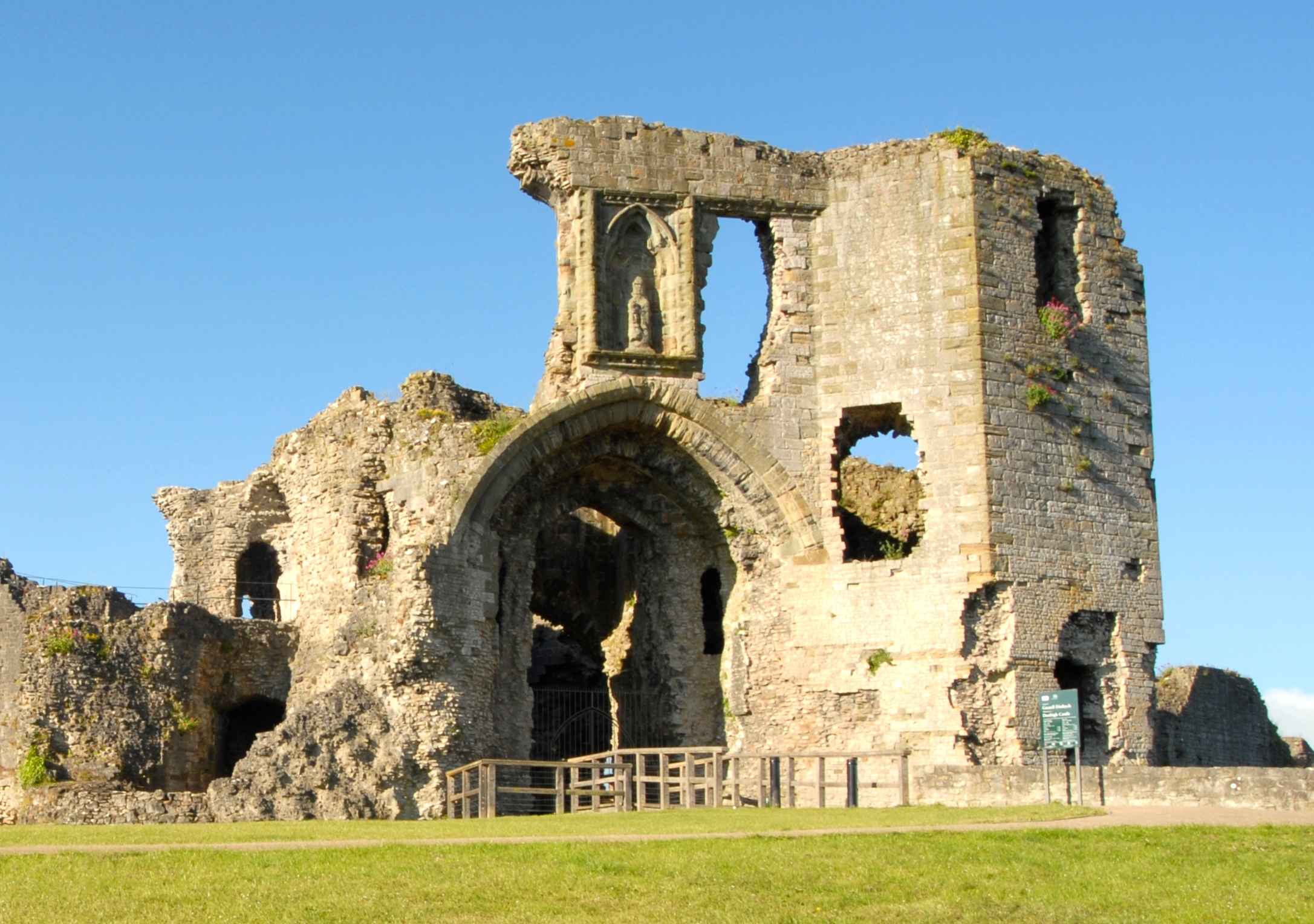
Gatehouse at Denbigh Castle

The 1535 Act creating the county declared Denbigh to be the "head and shire-town of the county or shire". The primary function of counties at that time was the administration of justice. The county's courts were directed to be held alternately at Denbigh and Wrexham. When sitting in Denbigh, the courts were initially held in the gatehouse of Denbigh Castle, which also served as a prison. The courts were overseen by the High Sheriff of Denbighshire.

From 1542, the county was represented in the Parliament of England by two constituencies: Denbigh Boroughs, comprising the four boroughs of Denbigh, Ruthin, Holt and Chirk, and a Denbighshire constituency covering the rest of the county outside those boroughs. Knights of the shire (MPs for the Denbighshire constituency) were elected at Denbigh.

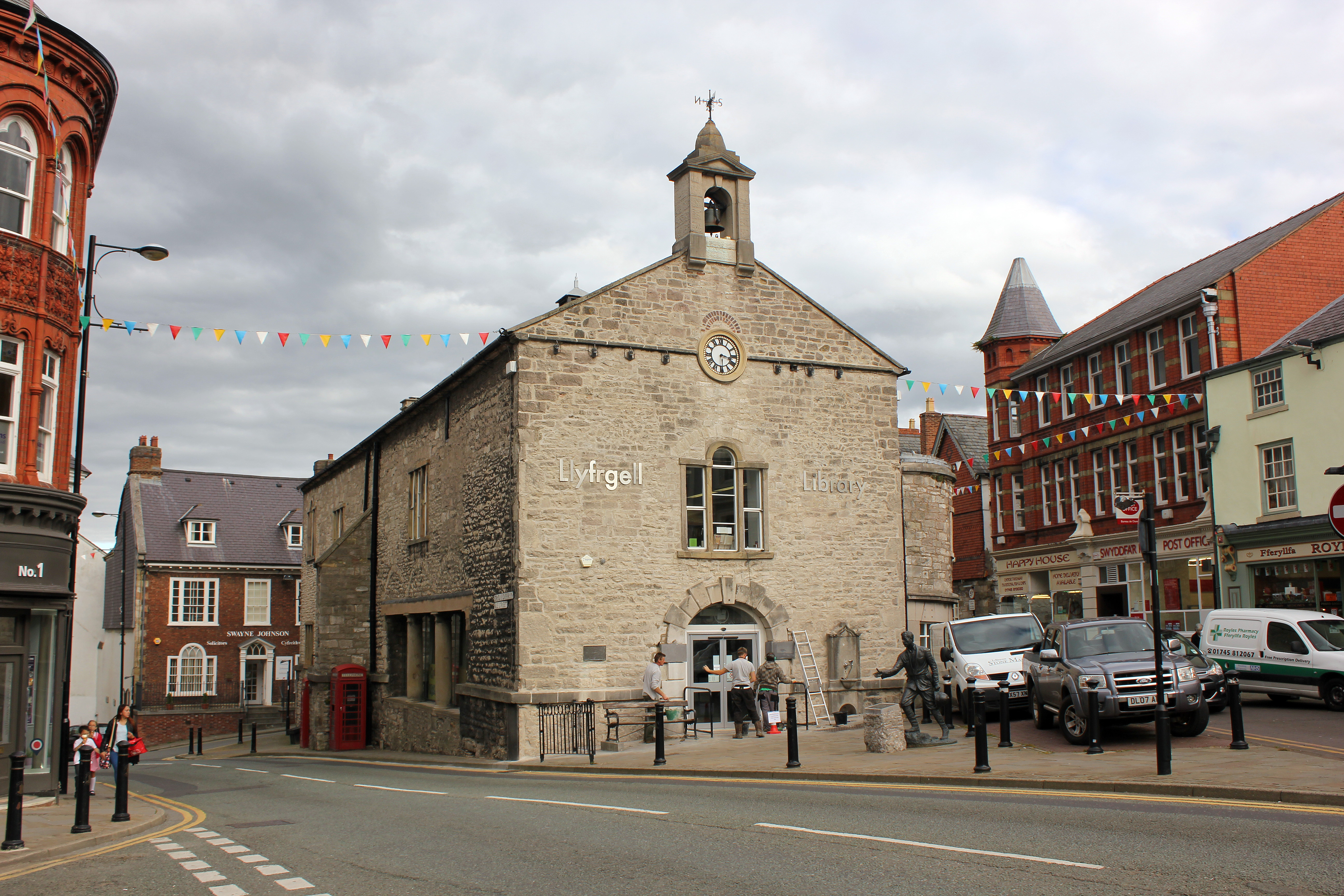
Denbigh Library, built 1572 as County Hall

A new County Hall was built in Denbigh in 1572, commissioned by Robert Dudley, 1st Earl of Leicester, who was lord of the manor of Denbigh. The building functioned as a market hall, town hall and courthouse for when the county's courts sat in the town.

Counties were also used as areas for organising the militia, overseen by a lieutenant. The counties of North Wales shared a lieutenant until 1761, after which a separate Lord Lieutenant of Denbighshire was appointed.

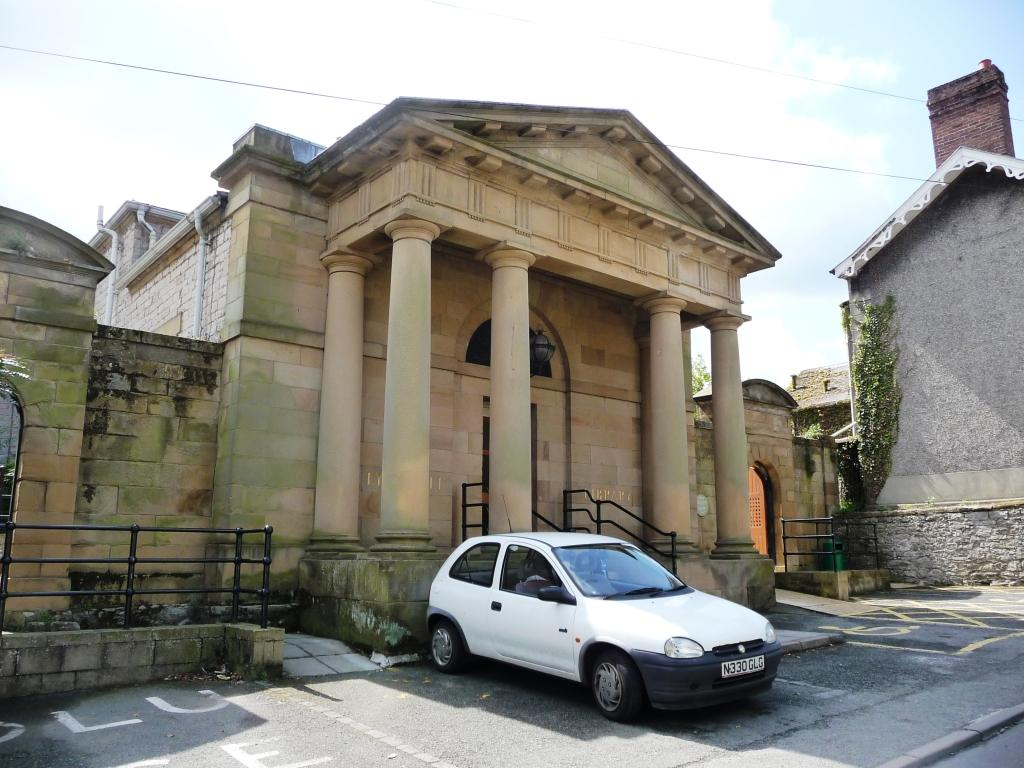
Old County Hall, Ruthin, built 1780s

By the 18th century, the county's senior courts, the great sessions, were being held solely in Wrexham. A new courthouse and record office, also called County Hall, was built at Ruthin in the 1780s, after which the great sessions transferred there. In 1832, the great sessions were replaced by the assizes, which also sat at the County Hall in Ruthin. The county's quarter sessions continued to be held alternately at Denbigh and Wrexham. The magistrates at the quarter sessions gradually took on various administrative functions.

The Denbigh Boroughs constituency was reformed in 1832 to add Wrexham to the list of boroughs represented, but exclude Chirk. The Denbighshire constituency was abolished in 1885, with the county outside the boroughs being split into two constituencies: East Denbighshire and West Denbighshire. The group of constituencies within the county was termed the 'parliamentary county'.

=== Administrative county ===
Elected county councils were established in 1889 under the Local Government Act 1888, taking over the administrative functions of the quarter sessions. County boundaries were adjusted at the same time such that each urban sanitary district which straddled county boundaries was placed entirely in the county which had the majority of the district's population. There were two such districts on Denbighshire's borders; Denbighshire gained the part of Colwyn Bay which had been in Caernarfonshire, but ceded a small part of Rhyl to Flintshire. The county as thus adjusted was termed the 'administrative county'; its boundaries were used for all county functions with the exception that constituencies were not changed. After 1889, the administrative county therefore diverged from the parliamentary county, which continued to be defined by reference to the county boundaries as they had been when the constituencies were last reviewed in 1885. The divergence ended when the constituencies were next reviewed in 1918, being redrawn to nest within the administrative county.

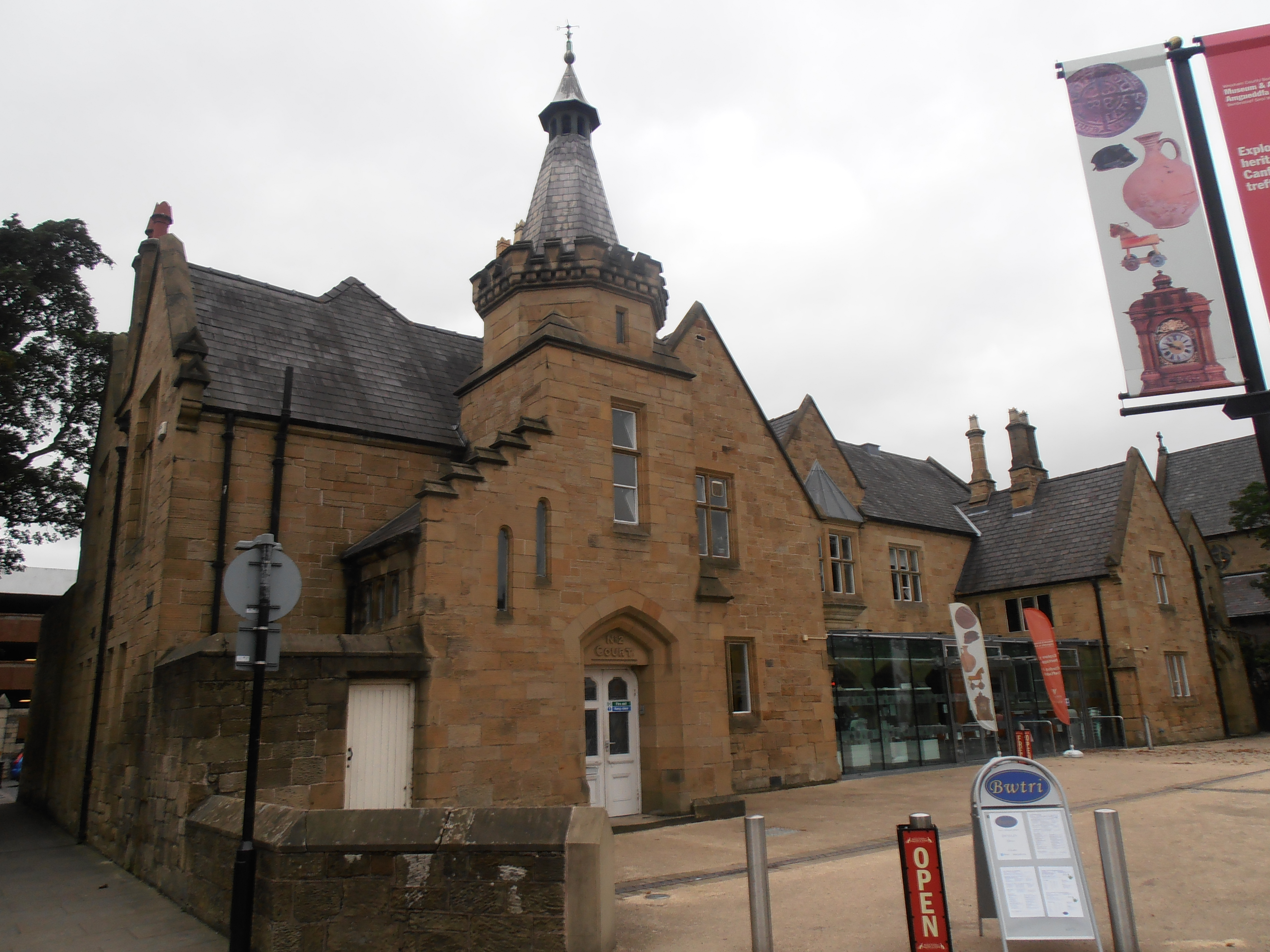
County Buildings, Wrexham: County Council's meeting place when sitting in Wrexham

The county council initially decided to meet alternately at the County Hall in Denbigh and County Buildings, Wrexham, as the quarter sessions had done. In 1891, the council decided to additionally meet in Ruthin, and in 1900 the council added Colwyn Bay to list of places where it met. It then held its regular meetings in rotation at Denbigh, Colwyn Bay, Ruthin and Wrexham until the abolition of the first incarnation of the county council in 1974.

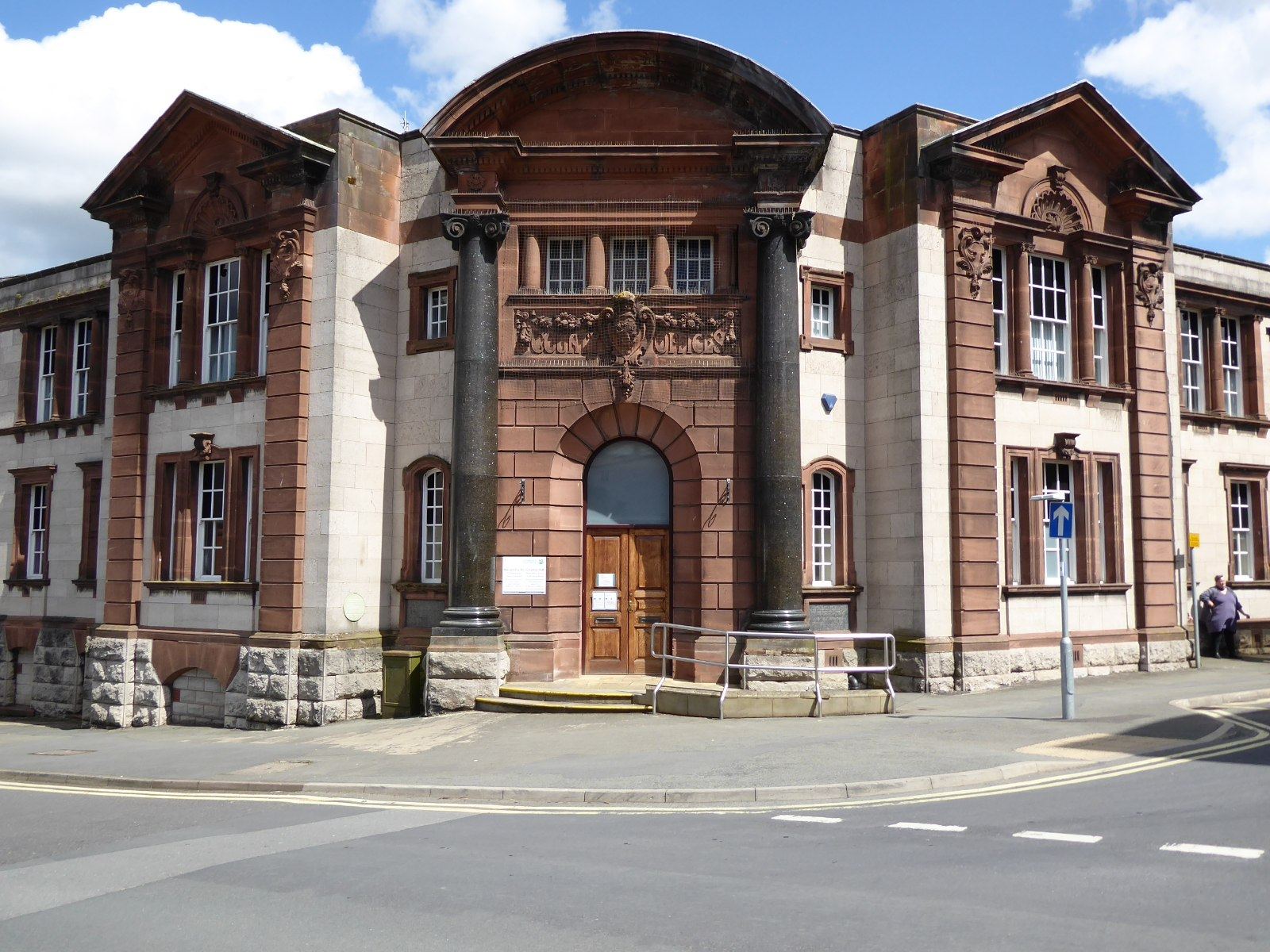
County Offices, Ruthin, completed 1909

Although the county council held its meetings in multiple towns, it recognised that there was a need for a main office building for the council's administrative staff. The county council was split on where such offices should be built. Ruthin Town Council was keen for Ruthin to host such offices rather than any other town. The town council therefore offered to donate to the county council a site it owned in the town. At a meeting in December 1905, the county council then narrowly decided (on the chairman's casting vote) to accept the offer and build its offices in Ruthin, despite protests from Wrexham Town Council. The new building, called County Offices, was completed in March 1909.

Counties gradually lost their non-local government functions. The militia was abolished in 1908, although a ceremonial lord lieutenant continued to be appointed, to act as the monarch's representative in the county. Counties lost their judicial functions in 1972, when the assizes and quarter sessions were abolished under the Courts Act 1971, but a ceremonial sheriff continued to be appointed. The administrative county of Denbighshire and its county council were abolished in 1974 under the Local Government Act 1972, with most of its area becoming part of the new county of Clwyd, save for an area on the western edge of the old county in the Conwy valley, which went to Gwynedd. The ceremonial sheriff and lieutenant of Denbighshire were also abolished at the same time, with sheriffs and lieutenants being appointed to the new counties instead.

Local government was reformed again in 1996, when a new Denbighshire was created, within notably different boundaries. Both pre-1974 and post-1996 Denbighshire include the Vale of Clwyd and the towns of Denbigh, Ruthin and Llangollen. The post-1996 county does not include the south-eastern part of the pre-1974 county around Wrexham, nor its western part around Abergele, Colwyn Bay and Llanrwst. Conversely, the post-1996 Denbighshire includes areas that had not been in the pre-1974 Denbigshire, notably the area around Rhyl, Prestatyn, Rhuddlan and St Asaph, which had been in Flintshire prior to 1974, and the area around Corwen, which had been in Merioneth prior to 1974.

== Geography ==
In the east of what was Denbighshire, the mountains of the Clwydian Range rose from 1000 to 2,500 ft (760 m) high. The south was hilly. There was some level ground along the coastal strip, and the Vale of Clwyd formed the central part of the county. The highest points were Moel Sych and Cader Berwyn at 2,728 feet (831 m). Pistyll-y-Rhaeader, a 240 feet (73 m) waterfall, was located in the county. The chief rivers were the Clwyd and the Dee. The River Conwy formed much of the county's western boundary.

The main towns in the county were Abergele, Colwyn Bay, Denbigh, Llangollen, Llanrwst, Ruthin, and Wrexham. Villages such as Glan Conwy, Eglwysbach, Holt and Llansannan were also in Denbighshire. The most important industries were agriculture and tourism, but around Wrexham the county had major resources in coal (see Denbighshire Coalfield) and ironstone, leading to ironworks of significance during the industrial revolution, notably at Bersham Ironworks and Brymbo Steelworks.

== Subdivisions ==
=== Parishes ===
From the medieval period until 1974, Denbighshire was divided into civil parishes for the purpose of local government; these in large part equated to ecclesiastical parishes (see the table below), most of which still exist as part of the Church in Wales. Chapelries are in italics.

Hundred	Parishes
Bromfield	Erbistock/Erbistog^{W} • Gresford/Gresffordd^{W} (Holt/Yr Holt) • Marchwiail/Marchwiel^{W} • Rhiwfabon/Ruabon^{W} • Wrexham/Wrecsam^{W}
Chirk	Llanarmon Dyffryn Ceiriog^{W} • Llangollen (Llansantffraid Glyn Ceiriog^{W}) • Llanrhaeadr-ym-Mochnant^{P} (Llanarmon Mynydd Mawr • Llangadwaladr • Llangedwyn) • Llansilin^{P} • Y Waun/Chirk^{W}
Isaled	Cerrigydrudion^{C} • Gwytherin^{C} • Henllan • Llanfair Talhaiarn^{C} • Llanfarchell (Dinbych/Denbigh) • Llanfihangel Glyn Myfyr^{C} • Llangernyw^{C} • Llangwm^{C} • Llannefydd^{C} • Llanrhaeadr-yng-Nghinmeirch • Llansannan^{C} • Nantglyn • Ysbyty Ifan/Yspytty Ifan^{C}
Isdulas	Abergele^{C} • Betws-yn-Rhos^{C} • Eglwysbach^{C} • Llanddoged/Llanddoget^{C} • Llanddulas^{C} • Llandrillo yn Rhos^{C} (Rhos Trillo) • Llanelian^{C} • Llanrwst^{C} (Capel Garmon) • Llansantffraid Glan Conwy^{C} • Llansansior/St George^{C}
Ruthin	Clocaenog • Derwen • Efenechtyd • Llanbedr Dyffryn Clwyd • Llandyrnog • Llanelidan • Llanfair Dyffryn Clwyd • Llanfwrog • Llangwyfan • Llangynhafal • Llanrhydd • Llanychan • Llanynys (Cyffylliog) • Rhuthun/Ruthin
Yale/Iâl	Bryneglwys • Llanarmon-yn-Iâl • Llandegla • Llandysilio-yn-Iâl/Llantysilio • Llanferres

Many of these parishes ended up in modern Denbighshire, but those marked C are in Conwy, those marked P are in Powys, and those marked W are in Wrexham.

=== Districts and boroughs ===
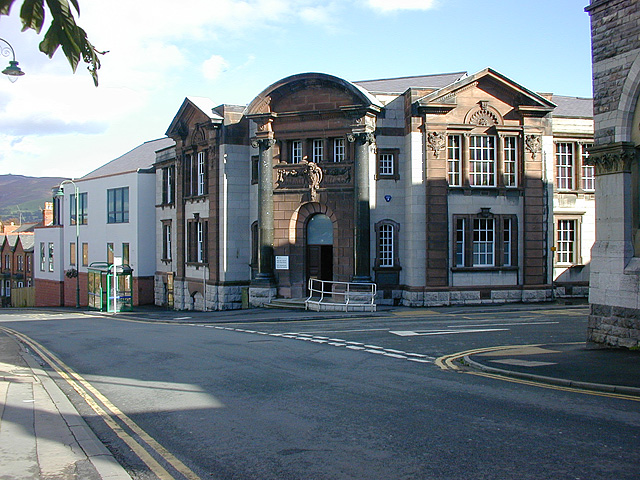
County Hall

After 1894, the administrative county was subdivided into municipal boroughs, urban districts and rural districts.

- The boroughs of Denbigh and Ruthin were reformed in 1836 by the Municipal Corporations Act 1835. The county's third borough, Wrexham, was incorporated in 1857. Colwyn Bay urban district was incorporated in 1934.
- Three urban districts were formed by the Local Government Act 1894: Abergele and Pensarn (renamed Abergele in 1935), Colwyn Bay and Colwyn (renamed Colwyn Bay in 1926, and incorporated as a borough in 1934) and Llangollen, as successors to urban sanitary districts. in 1897 Llanrwst urban district was formed.
- Eight rural districts were formed (also by the 1894 Act), based on existing rural sanitary districts: Chirk, Llangollen, Llanrwst, Llansillin, Ruthin, St Asaph (Denbigh), Uwchaled and Wrexham.

Two civil parishes: Llaneilian yn Rhos and Llansanffraid Glan Conway were administered as part of Conwy Rural District in the neighbouring county of Caernarfonshire. This area was sometimes called Glan Conway Rural District.

In 1935 the rural districts were reorganised by a County Review Order, and reduced to five in number: Aled, Ceiriog, Hiraethog, Ruthin and Wrexham.

== Places of special interest ==
- Bodnant Garden, Tal-y-Cafn (grid reference SH7972);
- Chirk Castle (grid reference SJ2638); (now in Wrexham County Borough)
- Denbigh Castle (grid reference SJ0565);
- Pillar of Eliseg (grid reference SJ2044);
- Plas Newydd, Llangollen (grid reference SJ2241);
- Valle Crucis Abbey, Llangollen (grid reference SJ2044).

== See also ==
- List of Custodes Rotulorum of Denbighshire
