= Llansillin Rural District =

Abolished Welsh rural district

Llansillin
- Area
  - 1901: 44,715 acres (180.96 km^{2})
  - 1931: 44,717 acres (180.96 km^{2})
- Population
  - 1901: 3,197
  - 1931: 2,718
- History
  - Created: 1894
  - Abolished: 1935
  - Succeeded by: Ceiriog Rural District
- Status: Rural District

Llansillin (anglicisation of the original Welsh Llansilin) was a rural district in the administrative county of Denbighshire from 1894 to 1935.

The rural district was formed from parts of Corwen, Llanfyllin and Oswestry Rural Sanitary Districts in Denbighshire.

The district contained six civil parishes:

- Llanarmon Dyffryn Ceiriog
- Llanarmon Mynydd Mawr
- Llangadwaladr
- Llangedwyn
- Llanrhaeadr ym Mochnant
- Llansilin

Llansillin Rural District was abolished by a County Review Order in 1935, becoming part of the new Ceiriog Rural District.

== Sources ==
Denbighshire Administrative County (Vision of Britain)
