= Gyrn Moelfre =

Coordinates: 52.85576°N 3.21268°W

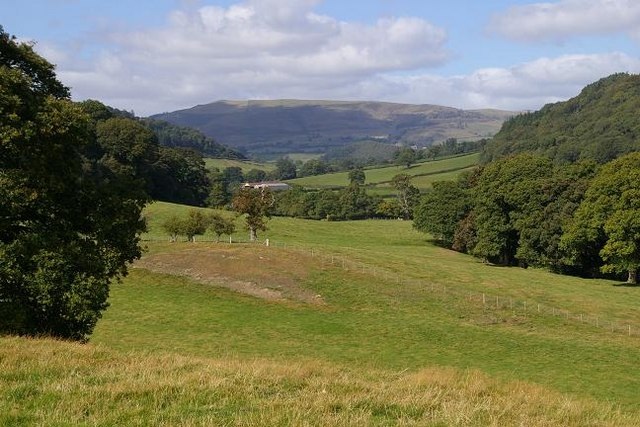

Highest point
- Elevation: 523 m (1,716 ft)
- Prominence: 237 m (778 ft)
- Parent peak: Cadair Berwyn
- Listing: Marilyn

Geography
- Location: Powys, Wales
- OS grid: SJ184293
- Topo map: OS Landranger 125

Gyrn Moelfre is a mountain in Powys, mid-Wales, near the border with Shropshire. It stands to the south-east of the Berwyns, from which it is separated by Afon Ysgwennant. The village of Llansilin lies on its south-west slopes. It was historically in Denbighshire and then became a part of Clywd following a local government reform in 1974. The area was transferred to Powys in 1996.

This mountain served as the filming location for the film ‘The Englishman who went up a hill but came down a mountain’, posing as ‘Ffynnon Garw’ from Gwynedd.

In the modern era, the "Gyrn" has played host to the British Downhill Series and some other smaller events on the downhill calendar.
