= Llanarmon Mynydd Mawr =

Coordinates: 52.841963°N 3.285388°W

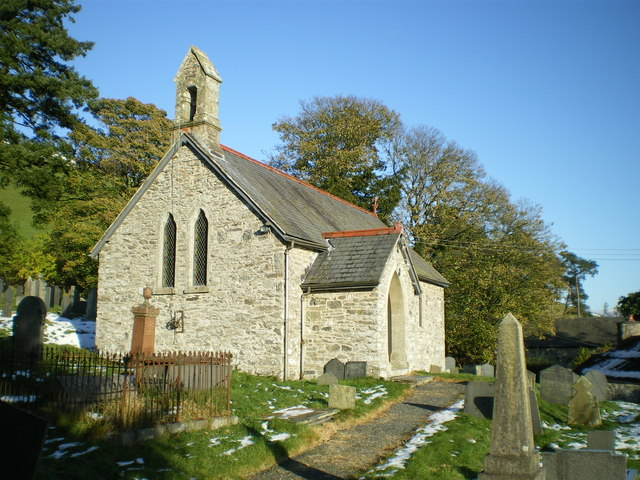
- St Garmon's church in Llanarmon Mynydd Mawr.

- Location within Powys
- Principal area: Powys
- Preserved county: Powys
- Country: Wales
- Sovereign state: United Kingdom
- Police: Dyfed-Powys
- Fire: Mid and West Wales
- Ambulance: Welsh

Llanarmon Mynydd Mawr, occasionally referred to as Llanarmon Fach, is an isolated rural parish in Powys, Wales. It was formerly in Denbighshire, and from 1974 to 1996 was in the county of Clwyd. It measures 2 square miles (5 km^{2}) and has a population of 40.

The scattered settlement lies on the south-facing slopes of the Berwyn Mountains in the high upper part of the Tanat Valley, at around 950 feet above sea level. Its name translates roughly as "St Garmon's church [on the] Great Mountain", distinguishing it from the village of Llanarmon Dyffryn Ceiriog, 5 miles (8 km) away in the Ceiriog Valley.

== History ==
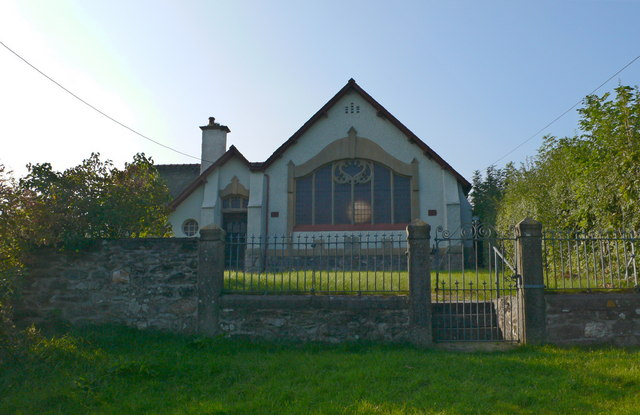
Hermon chapel, Tai-bach, built in 1827 and rebuilt in 1906

The church of St. Garmon is thought to be of early-mediaeval origin; it was 'restored' in 1886 to designs by W. H. Spaull of Oswestry. The area was historically part of the parish of Llanrhaeadr-ym-Mochnant but eventually became a separate township. It is now part of the community of Llanrhaeadr-ym-Mochnant for civil administration purposes.

The area of the parish is today largely mountain pasture. As with many such communities, its population has fallen over the years: in 1833 it had 164 inhabitants. There are a number of rare late-medieval cruck-framed buildings. There is also a Calvinistic Methodist chapel, Hermon, rebuilt in 1906 in a "curious" Art Nouveau-influenced style.

The academic Griffith Hartwell Jones was the son of a rector of Llanarmon Mynydd Mawr, the Rev. Edward Jones. A previous incumbent (1578–95) was William Morgan, Bible translator and later Bishop of Llandaff.
