= Llanarmon Dyffryn Ceiriog =

Village in Wrexham County Borough, Wales

Coordinates: 52.886°N 3.249°W

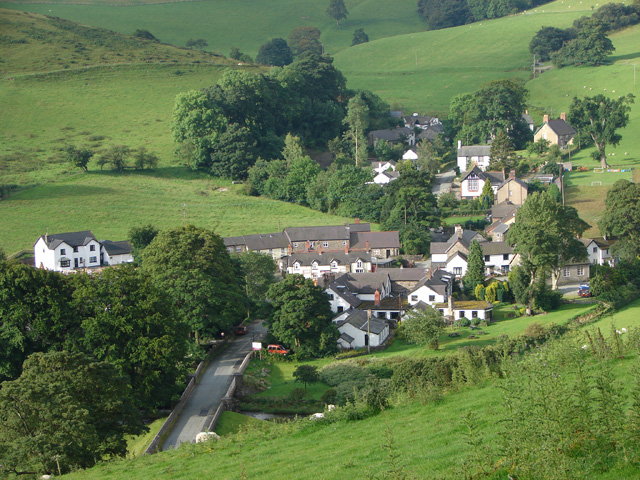
- View of Llanarmon Dyffryn Ceiriog

- Location within Wrexham
- Language: Welsh; British English
- OS grid reference: SJ159328
- Community: Ceiriog Ucha
- Principal area: Wrexham
- Preserved county: Clwyd
- Country: Wales
- Sovereign state: United Kingdom
- Post town: LLANGOLLEN
- Postcode district: LL20
- Dialling code: 01691
- Police: North Wales
- Fire: North Wales
- Ambulance: Welsh
- UK Parliament: Montgomeryshire and Glyndŵr
- Senedd Cymru – Welsh Parliament: Clwyd South

Llanarmon Dyffryn Ceiriog (Welsh pronunciation; often referred to as Llanarmon DC or locally simply as Llanarmon) is a village in Wrexham County Borough, Wales. It lies on the River Ceiriog and is at the end of the B4500 road, five miles (8.0 km) south-west of Glyn Ceiriog and ten miles (16 km) north-west of Oswestry. It is within the Ceiriog Valley ward, Clwyd South Senedd constituency and Montgomeryshire and Glyndŵr UK parliamentary constituency. It is in the community of Ceiriog Ucha ("Upper Ceiriog").

== Name ==
The name Llanarmon Dyffryn Ceiriog roughly translates into English as "the church of St Garmon in the valley of the river Ceiriog".

Although known locally simply as 'Llanarmon', the addition of 'Dyffryn Ceiriog' or 'DC' is necessary to distinguish it from other villages named Llanarmon, such as Llanarmon-yn-Iâl, which was also in Denbighshire, and the remote rural parish of Llanarmon Mynydd Mawr, around 5 miles to the south on the high slopes of the Tanat Valley.

== History and landscape ==
The village grew up at the intersection of several drovers' roads which forded the River Ceiriog. It still has two inns, the Hand and the West Arms, which originally served drovers taking their flocks to market: the inns' names are a reference to the armorial bearings of two prominent landowning families, the Myddletons of Chirk Castle and the Wests of Ruthin Castle. It also has an ancient tithe barn, now converted into a dwelling house.

The village church of St Garmon was possibly named after Germanus of Auxerre, though there have been suggestions of an alternative St Garmon. The original church was reputedly founded in the 5th century, and rebuilt in the medieval period. It was, however, largely demolished and rebuilt in 1846, and nothing remains of its earlier fabric. A hoard of coins of the reign of Edward IV was found during the demolition.

The churchyard contains a mound, the Tomen Garmon, which may be of Bronze Age origin, accompanied by ancient yew trees.

Llanarmon Dyffryn Ceiriog is situated in the upper Ceiriog Valley, which is known both for its high landscape value, being extremely scenic and dominated by traditional agricultural use, and as a strong centre of Welsh culture. In the 2001 census of neighbourhood Wrexham 019B, containing the village, 55.1% of residents were found to have knowledge of the Welsh language, against 28.4% in Wales as a whole.

== Administration ==
=== Civic history ===
From the mid-16th century until 1974, Llanarmon Dyffryn Ceiriog was governed by the then administrative county of Denbighshire, which was divided into various rural districts. From 1895 to 1935, Llanarmon Dyffryn Ceiriog was in the Llansillin Rural District, which merged in 1935 with Chirk Rural District to form the Ceiriog Rural District. Llanarmon Dyffryn Ceiriog was in the Ceiriog Rural District from 1935 to 1974.

In 1974, Denbighshire was abolished as an administrative county, and Llanarmon Dyffryn Ceiriog was incorporated into the Glyndŵr District of the new county of Clwyd. Clwyd and Glyndŵr District were dissolved in 1996, and Llanarmon Dyffryn Ceiriog became a part of the new unitary authority of Wrexham County Borough, in which it remains to the present day.

=== Political representation ===
Llanarmon Dyffryn Ceiriog is in the Ceiriog Valley ward of Wrexham County Borough Council, and has an Independent councillor.

Since 2011, Llanarmon Dyffryn Ceiriog has been represented at the Senedd by Ken Skates, the Labour Party Member of the Senedd for Clwyd South. Since 2024, it has been represented at the UK Parliament by Steve Witherden, the Labour Party MP for Montgomeryshire and Glyndŵr.

== Notable residents ==
The Welsh poet John Ceiriog Hughes was born at Pen-y-Bryn Farm at Llanarmon Dyffryn Ceiriog in 1832, and spent his childhood there.

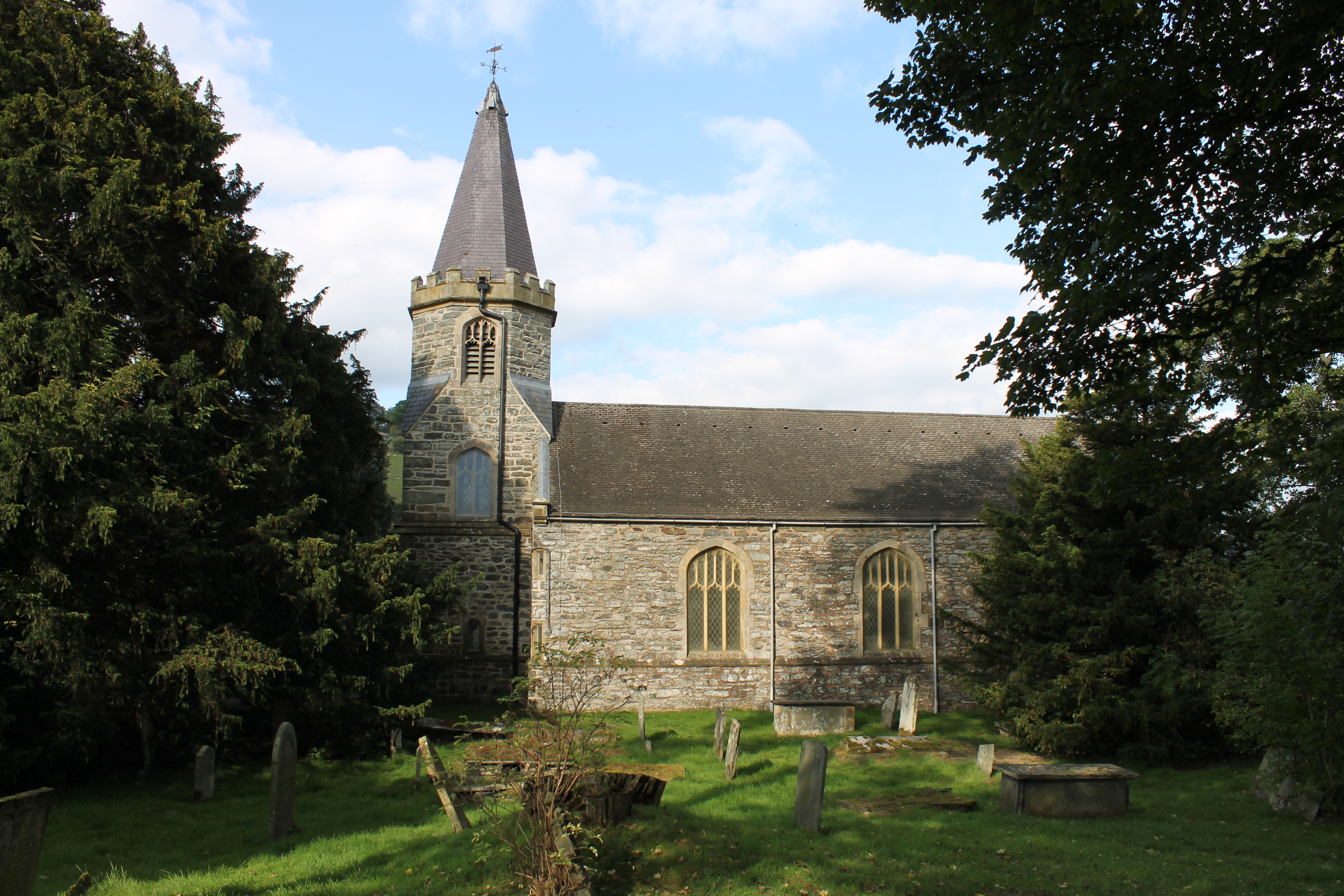

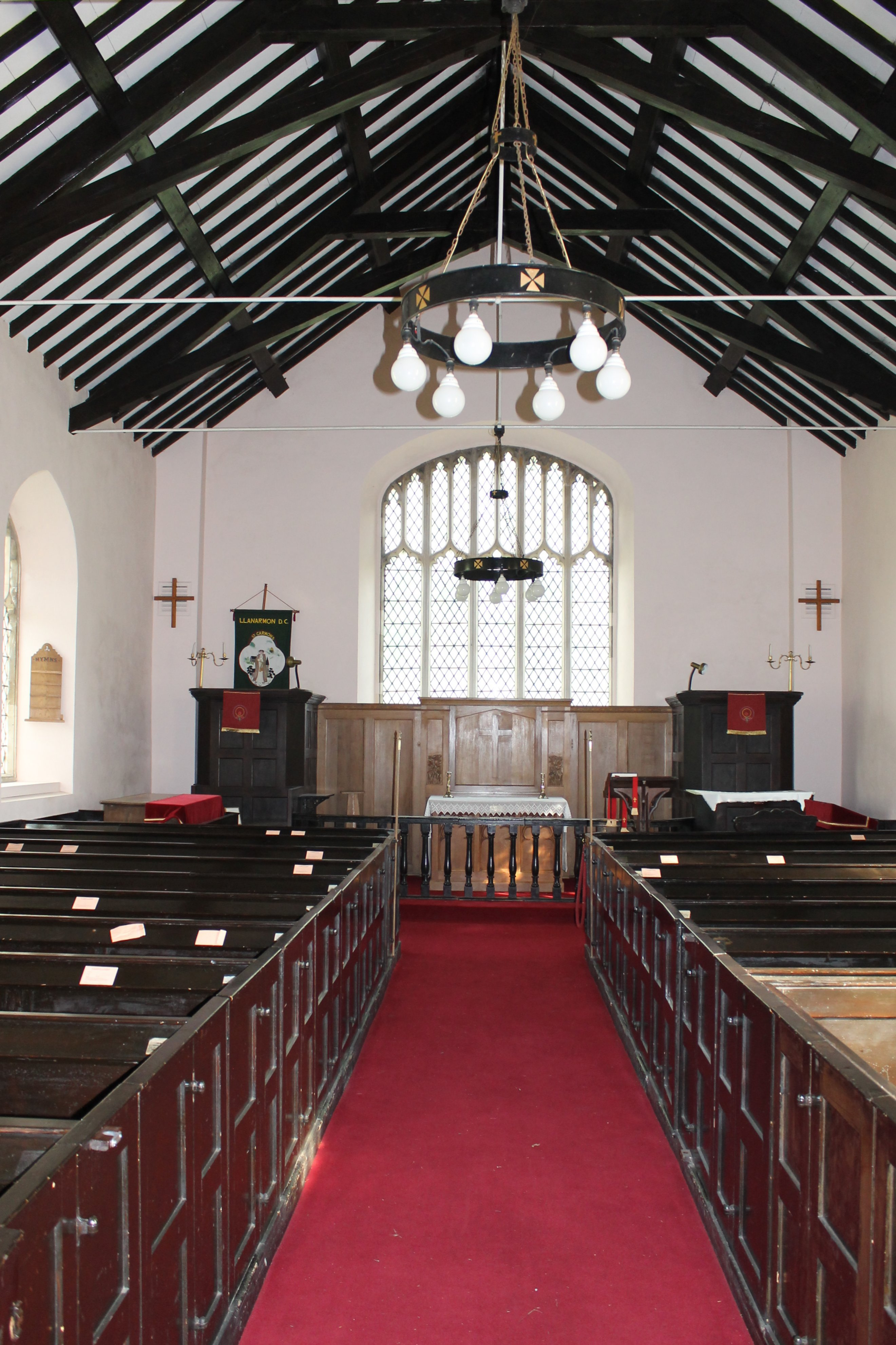

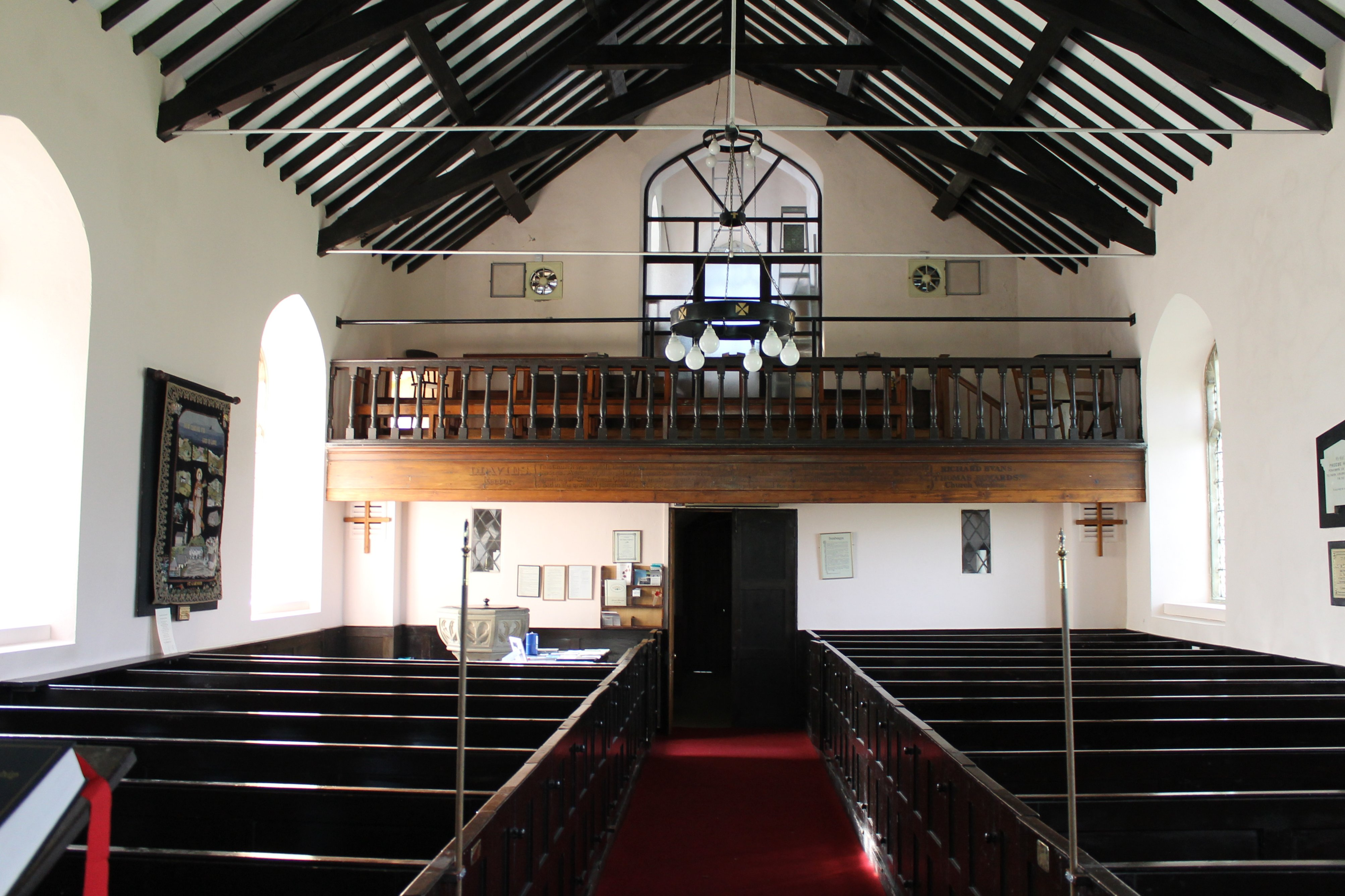

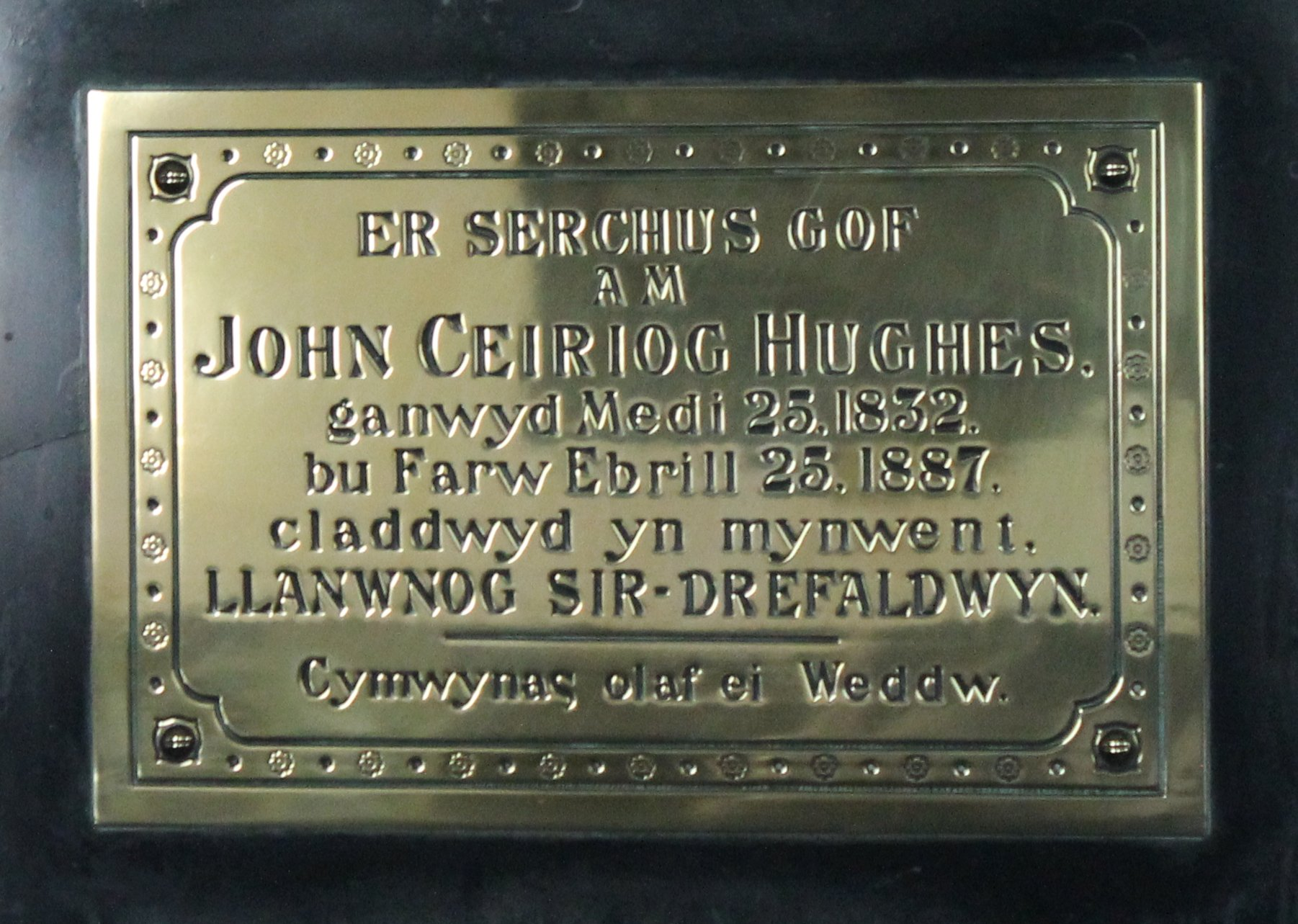

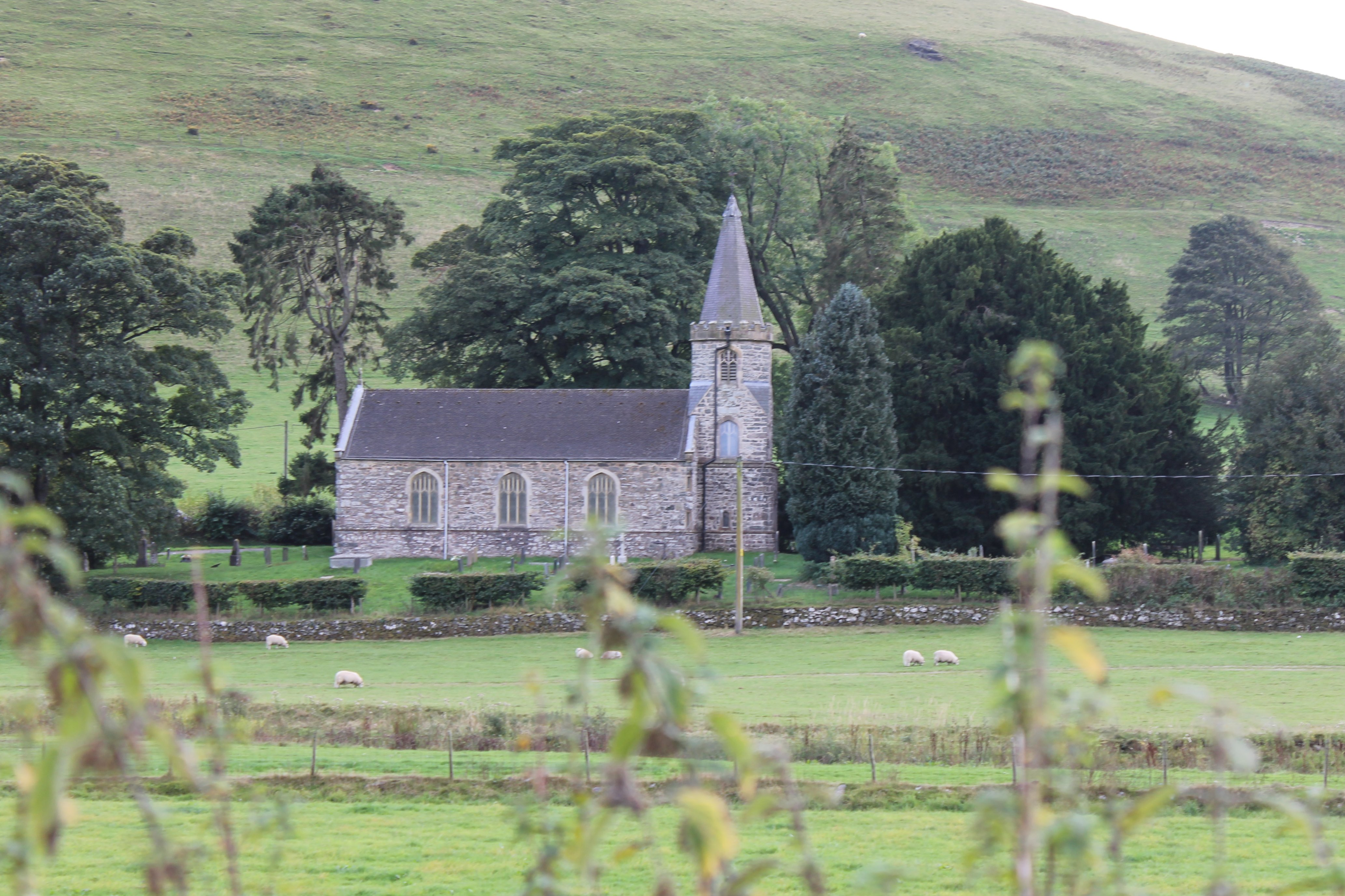

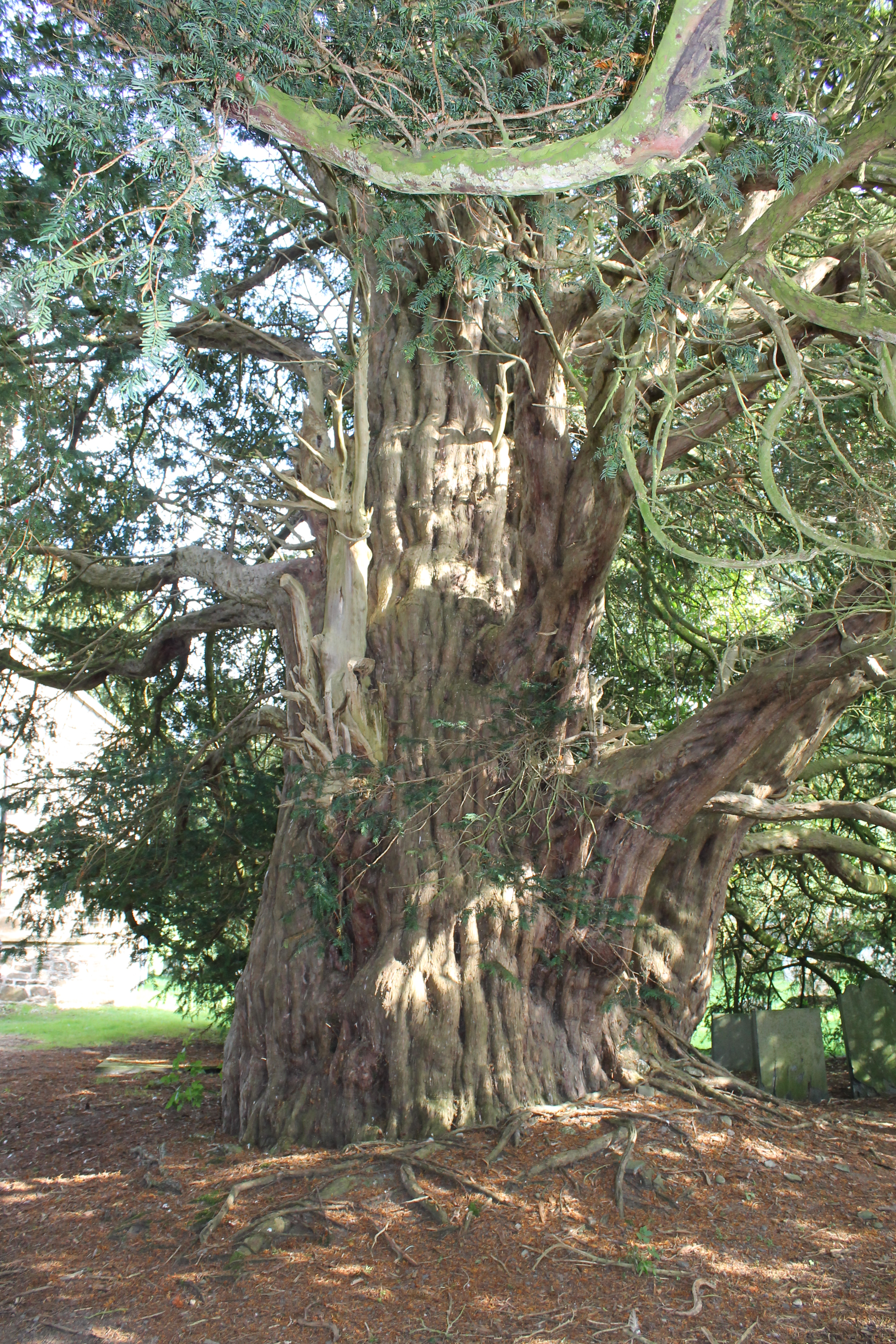

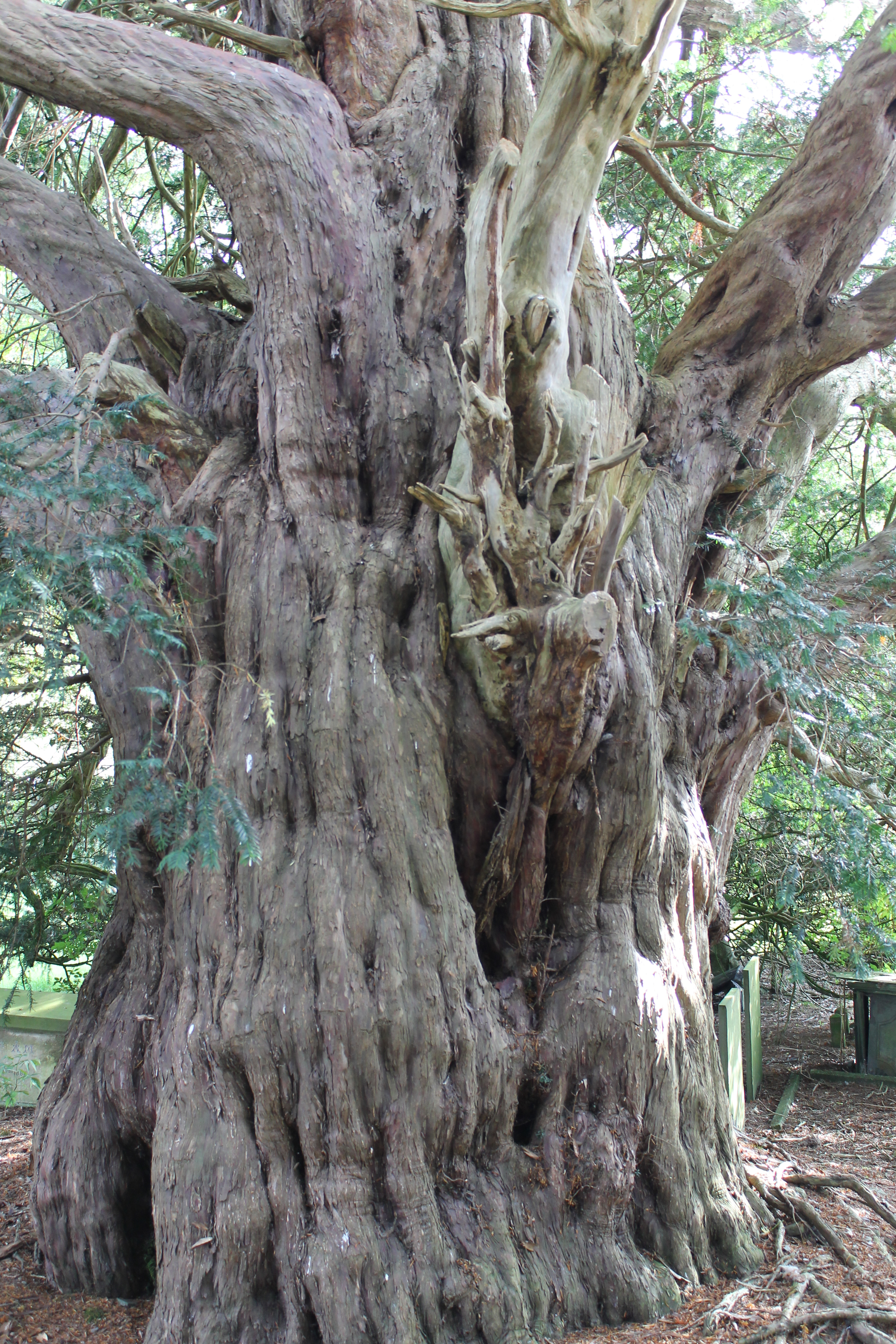
