= Ceiriog Valley =

Valley in north-east Wales

Coordinates: 52.915°N 3.197°W

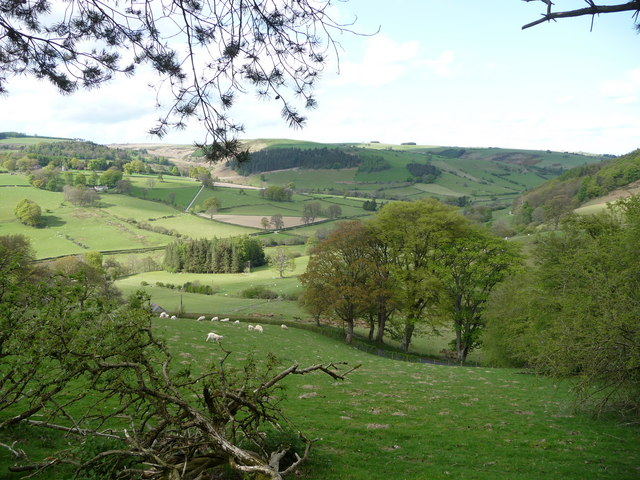
View over part of the Ceiriog Valley

Location of the "Dyffryn Ceiriog" (transl. Ceiriog Valley) electoral ward in Wrexham County Borough, Wales

The Ceiriog Valley (Welsh: Dyffryn Ceiriog) is the valley of the River Ceiriog in north-east Wales. It is also (under its Welsh name) an electoral ward of Wrexham County Borough. The ward is the largest ward of the county borough by area and forms a strikingly-shaped salient of the county borough between Powys and Denbighshire.

== Geography ==
The valley forms part of the traditional county of Denbighshire, and between 1974 and 1996 was part of the short-lived county of Clwyd. Part of the lower end of the valley extends into Shropshire, England. The Ceiriog Valley is 20 kilometres (12 mi) long and runs generally west to east, south of the Vale of Llangollen. It is something of a dead end, with the B4500 road terminating at Llanarmon Dyffryn Ceiriog, a village near the head of the valley.

The 8.25 miles (13.28 km)-long, 2 ft 4 1/2 in (724 mm)-gauge Glyn Valley Tramway used to run through some of the valley; it served various quarries and provided a passenger service between Chirk and Glyn Ceiriog.

The valley receives relatively few visitors, despite being only a few miles from the A5 road. It was described by British Prime Minister David Lloyd George as "a little bit of heaven on earth".

== Communities ==
The Ceiriog Valley is divided into three communities: from west to east, Ceiriog Ucha ("Upper Ceiriog"), Llansantffraid Glyn Ceiriog, and Glyntraian. The largest village in the Ceiriog Valley is Glyn Ceiriog (also known as Llansantffraid Glyn Ceiriog). Villages and hamlets in the Ceiriog Valley include:

=== Ceiriog Ucha ===
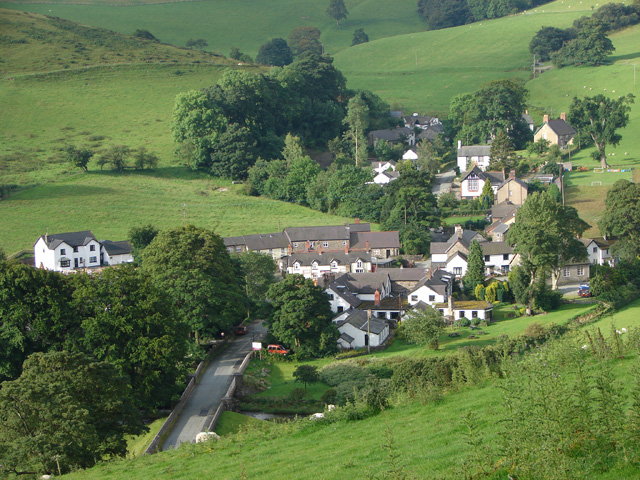
Llanarmon Dyffryn Ceiriog

- Llanarmon Dyffryn Ceiriog
- Tregeiriog

=== Llansantffraid Glyn Ceiriog ===
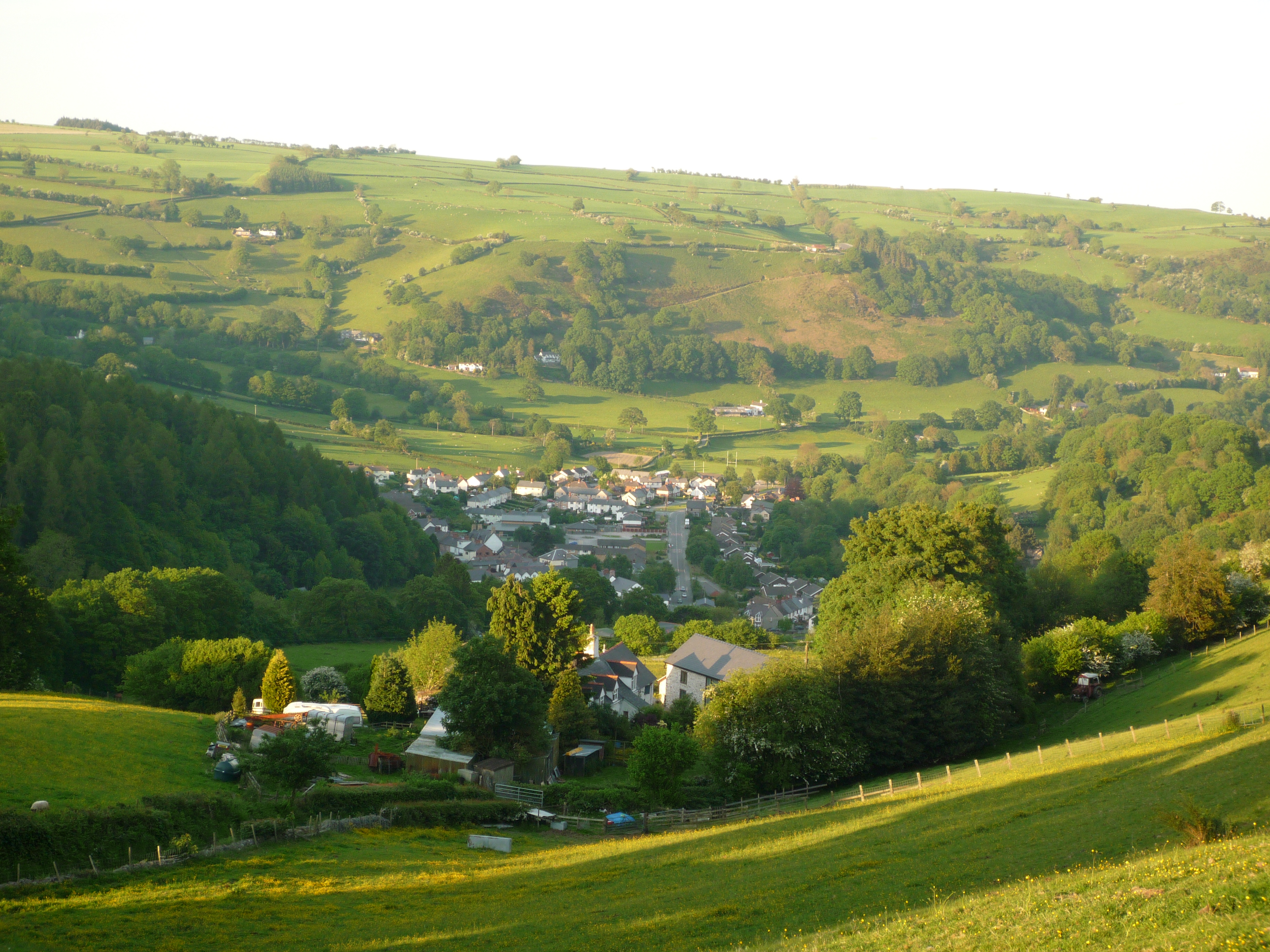
Glyn Ceiriog

- Glyn Ceiriog
- Nantyr
- Pandy

=== Glyntraian ===
- Dolywern
- Llechrydau
- Llwynmawr
- Pontfadog

== Literary figures ==
Three notable Welsh poets have connections with the Ceiriog Valley:

- John Hughes (1832–1887) was born on a housing estate near Llanarmon Dyffryn Ceiriog, and took the middle name Ceiriog and also used it as his bardic name;
- Huw Morus (1622–1709) was born and lived in Pont Y Meibion (14c) Farm near Pandy in the Ceiriog Valley; his bardic name was Eos Ceiriog (the Nightingale of Ceiriog); and
- Robert Ellis (Cynddelw) (1812–1875) was a Baptist minister in Glyn Ceiriog from 1838 until 1840.

The Ceiriog Memorial Institute in the village of Glyn Ceiriog was built as a memorial to them all, and contains stained glass windows dedicated to each of their memories.

The Welsh-language novelist Islwyn Ffowc Elis was born in Wrexham, but spent most of his formative childhood years on a hill farm in the Ceiriog Valley.

== See also ==
- Chirk
- Llangollen

== Bibliography ==
- Dewi Parry Jones and Robert Owen Jones, "100 Years in the Valley – Y Glyn a Fu" (1998)
- Dewi Parry Jones and Robert Owen Jones, "100 Years in the Valley Volume II – Y Glyn a Fu" (1999)
