= River Ceiriog =

River in north east Wales

Coordinates: 52°57′N 3°00′W

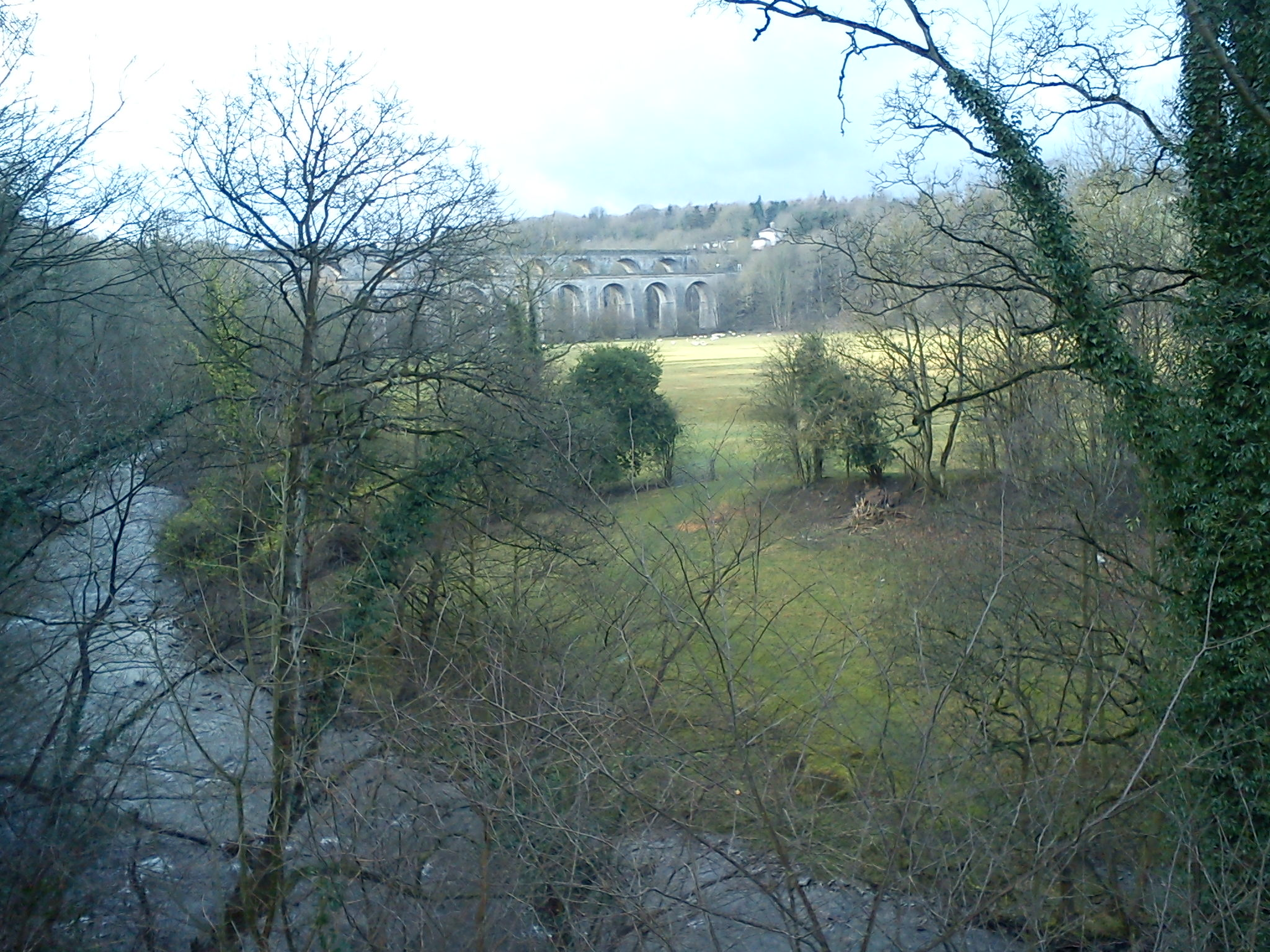
River with Chirk Aqueduct and Viaduct

The River Ceiriog (Welsh: Afon Ceiriog) is an 18 miles (29 km) long river in north east Wales, whose name may derive from a term meaning "favoured one". It is a tributary of the River Dee. It rises at an altitude of around 1,800 ft (549 m) on the south east slopes of Moel Fferna in the Berwyn Mountains, and flows through the Ceiriog Valley in Wrexham County Borough. It flows below Chirk Castle and the town of Chirk, where the Chirk Aqueduct carries the Llangollen Canal, and the Chirk Viaduct carries the Shrewsbury–Chester line over the river. The Ceiriog joins the Dee east of the town. In its lower reaches, the river forms the border between Wales and Shropshire in England. Home to a trout fishing club, the river and its valley were described by British prime minister David Lloyd George as "a little bit of heaven on earth". As well as being a home to trout, the first grayling to be artificially reared in Wales were released into the river in 2009.

Due to its steep gradient and juvenile nature the river can be wild at times and has been named as the fastest flowing in Wales. On 16 July 2013, a 21-year-old man was found drowned on a stretch of the river near where it meets the Dee.

Natural Resources Wales (Cyfoeth Naturiol Cymru)) monitors the river levels at the estate of Brynkinalt. The mean level of the river here is between 0.17 m (1 ft) and 0.73 m (2 ft) and depths of up to 1.66 m (5 ft) have been recorded. As it nears its end the river can get significantly deeper.
