= List of UK Parliament constituencies in Clwyd =

Seven constituencies cover Clwyd. They are county constituencies (for type of returning officer and election expenses) of the House of Commons of the UK Parliament, and are used also for elections to the Senedd. The current boundaries have been effective since the 2007 National Assembly for Wales election and the 2010 United Kingdom general election.

Clwyd is one of the eight preserved counties of Wales. As currently defined, the preserved county consists of the principal areas of Conwy, Denbighshire, Flintshire and Wrexham.

For Senedd elections, constituencies are grouped into additional member electoral regions, and changes to constituency boundaries mean, also, changes to regional boundaries.

== Westminster boundaries ==
=== From 2010 to 2024 ===
Constituency	Boundaries
1. Aberconwy CC	Parliamentary constituencies in Clwyd 2010
2. Alyn and Deeside CC	Parliamentary constituencies in Clwyd 2010
3. Clwyd South CC	Parliamentary constituencies in Clwyd 2010
4. Clwyd West CC	Parliamentary constituencies in Clwyd 2010
5. Delyn CC	Parliamentary constituencies in Clwyd 2010
6. Vale of Clwyd CC	Parliamentary constituencies in Clwyd 2010
7. Wrexham CC	Parliamentary constituencies in Clwyd 2010

Conservative † Labour ‡

Constituency	Electorate	Majority	Member of Parliament	Nearest opposition	Map reference above
Aberconwy	44,699	2,034	Robin Millar †	Emily Owen ‡	1
Alyn and Deeside	62,783	213	Mark Tami ‡	Sanjoy Sen †	2
Clwyd South	53,919	1,239	Simon Baynes †	Susan Elan Jones ‡	3
Clwyd West	57,714	6,747	David Jones †	Jo Thomas ‡	4
Delyn	54,552	865	Rob Roberts †	David Hanson ‡	5
Vale of Clwyd	56,649	1,827	James Davies †	Chris Ruane ‡	6
Wrexham	49,734	2,131	Sarah Atherton †	Mary Wimbury ‡	7

=== 1997 to 2010 ===
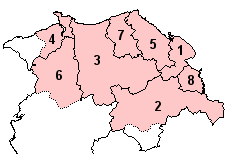
Constituency	Boundaries
1. Alyn and Deeside CC (Westminster)	Parliamentary constituencies in Clwyd pre-2010
2. Clwyd South CC (Westminster) (part)	Parliamentary constituencies in Clwyd pre-2010
3. Clwyd West CC (Westminster)	Parliamentary constituencies in Clwyd pre-2010
4. Conwy CC (Westminster) (part)	Parliamentary constituencies in Clwyd pre-2010
5. Delyn CC (Westminster)	Parliamentary constituencies in Clwyd pre-2010
6. Meirionnydd Nant Conwy CC (Westminster) (part)	Parliamentary constituencies in Clwyd pre-2010
7. Vale of Clwyd CC (Westminster)	Parliamentary constituencies in Clwyd pre-2010
8. Wrexham CC (Westminster)	Parliamentary constituencies in Clwyd pre-2010

The Clwyd South constituency was also partly a Powys constituency, and the Conwy and Meirionnydd Nant Conwy constituencies were also partly Gwynedd constituencies.

== Proposed boundary changes ==
The Boundary Commission for Wales submitted their final proposals in respect of the Sixth Periodic Review of Westminster constituencies (the 2018 review) in September 2018. Although the proposals were immediately laid before Parliament they were not brought forward by the Government for approval. Accordingly, they did not come into effect for the 2019 election which took place on 12 December 2019, and which was contested using the constituency boundaries in place since 2010.

Under the terms of the Parliamentary Voting System and Constituencies Act 2011, the Sixth Review was based on reducing the total number of MPs from 650 to 600 and a strict electoral parity requirement that the electorate of all constituencies should be within a range of 5% either side of the electoral quota.

On 24 March 2020, the Minister of State for the Cabinet Office, Chloe Smith, issued a written statement to Parliament setting out the Government's thinking with regard to parliamentary boundaries. They propose to bring forward primary legislation to remove the statutory obligation to implement the 2018 Boundary Review recommendations, as well as set the framework for future boundary reviews in time for the next review which is due to begin in early 2021 and report no later than October 2023. It is proposed that the number of constituencies now remains at the current level of 650, rather than being reduced to 600, while retaining the requirement that the electorate should be no more than +/- 5% from the electoral quota.

== Senedd boundaries ==
=== From 2007 ===
Constituency	Senedd region	Constituency boundaries
1. Aberconwy CC (Senedd)	North Wales	Senedd constituencies in Clwyd 2007
2. Alyn and Deeside CC (Senedd)	North Wales	Senedd constituencies in Clwyd 2007
3. Clwyd South CC (Senedd)	North Wales	Senedd constituencies in Clwyd 2007
4. Clwyd West CC (Senedd)	North Wales	Senedd constituencies in Clwyd 2007
5. Delyn CC (Senedd)	North Wales	Senedd constituencies in Clwyd 2007
6. Vale of Clwyd CC (Senedd)	North Wales	Senedd constituencies in Clwyd 2007
7. Wrexham CC (Senedd)	North Wales	Senedd constituencies in Clwyd 2007

The seven constituencies are all in the North Wales electoral region, which also includes two Gwynedd constituencies.

=== 1999 to 2007 ===
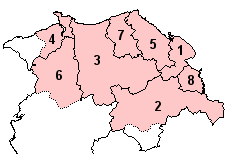
Constituency	Assembly region	Constituency boundaries
1. Alyn and Deeside CC (Assembly)	North Wales	Assembly constituencies in Clwyd pre-2007
2. Clwyd South CC (Assembly) (part)	North Wales	Assembly constituencies in Clwyd pre-2007
3. Clwyd West CC (Assembly)	North Wales	Assembly constituencies in Clwyd pre-2007
4. Conwy CC (Assembly) (part)	North Wales	Assembly constituencies in Clwyd pre-2007
5. Delyn CC (Assembly)	North Wales	Assembly constituencies in Clwyd pre-2007
6. Meirionnydd Nant Conwy CC (Assembly) (part)	Mid and West Wales	Assembly constituencies in Clwyd pre-2007
7. Vale of Clwyd CC (Assembly)	North Wales	Assembly constituencies in Clwyd pre-2007
8. Wrexham CC (Assembly)	North Wales	Assembly constituencies in Clwyd pre-2007

== Results ==
=== 2019 ===
The number of votes cast for each political party who fielded candidates in constituencies comprising Clwyd in the 2019 general election were as follows:

Party	Votes	%	Change from 2017	Seats	Change from 2017
Conservative	118,595	45.5%	▲	6	▲4
Labour	103,965	39.9%	▼	1	▼4
Plaid Cymru	15,310	5.9%			
Liberal Democrats	13,366	5.1%	▲		
Brexit	8,816	3.4%	new		
Greens	445	0.2%			
Total	260,497	100.0		7	

=== Westminster elections ===
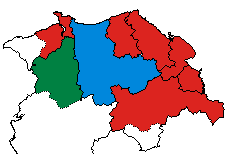
2005

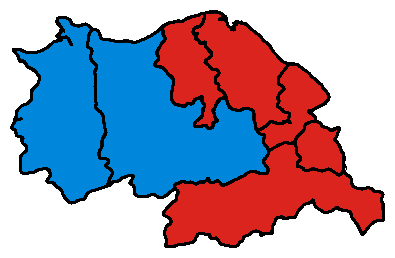
2010

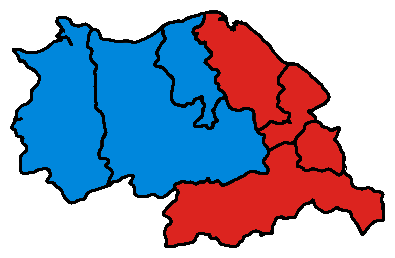
2015

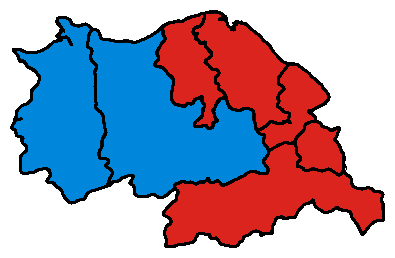
2017

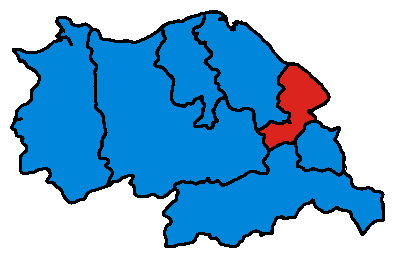
2019

=== Assembly/Senedd elections ===
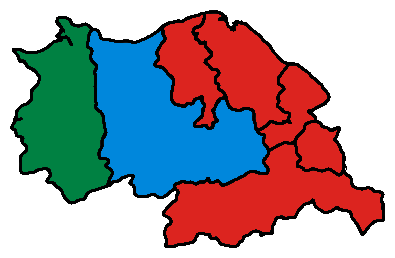
2007

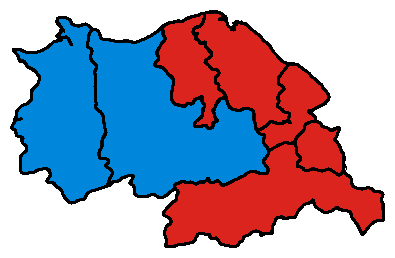
2011

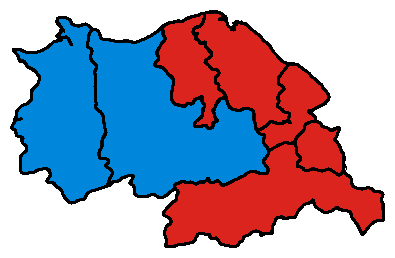
2016

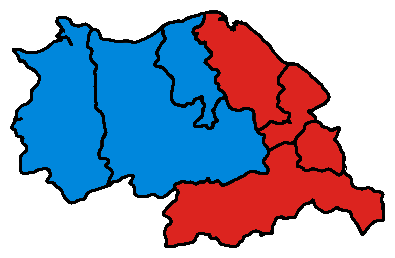
2021

== Historical representation by party ==
A cell marked → (with a different colour background to the preceding cell) indicates that the previous MP continued to sit under a new party name.

=== 1832 to 1859 ===
Conservative Peelite Whig

Constituency	1832	1835	1837	40	1841	42	1847	1852	54	1857
Denbigh Boroughs	Madock	Jones			Mainwaring		West			Mainwaring
Denbighshire	Myddleton-Biddulph	Bagot						Myddleton-Biddulph		
Denbighshire	W. Williams-Wynn			Cholmondeley	W. Williams-Wynn jnr					
Flint Boroughs	Glynne	→	Dundas		Williams-Bulkeley		Hanmer			
Flintshire	E. Lloyd-Mostyn		Glynne		E. Lloyd-Mostyn	Glynne	E. Lloyd-Mostyn		T. Lloyd-Mostyn	

=== 1859 to 1885 ===
Conservative Liberal

Constituency	1859	61	1865	1868	72	1874	78	1880	85
Denbigh Boroughs	Mainwaring			Williams				Cunliffe	
Denbighshire	Myddleton-Biddulph			Morgan					
Denbighshire	W. Williams-Wynn jnr								H. Williams-Wynn
Flint Boroughs	Hanmer				Cunliffe	Eyton	Roberts		
Flintshire	T. Lloyd-Mostyn	Grosvenor							

=== 1885 to 1918 ===
Conservative Liberal Liberal Unionist

Constituency	1885	86	1886	1892	1895	97	1900	1906	06	Jan 1910	Dec 1910	13
Denbigh Boroughs	Kenyon				Howell		Kenyon	Edwards		Ormsby-Gore		
Denbighshire East	Morgan					Moss			Hemmerde		John	
Denbighshire West	West		→	Roberts								
Flint Boroughs	Roberts			Lewis				Idris		Summers		Parry
Flintshire	Grosvenor	Smith						Lewis				

=== 1918 to 1950 ===
Coalition Liberal (1918–22) / National Liberal (1922–23) Conservative Independent Labour Liberal National Liberal (1931–68)

Constituency	1918	1922	1923	1924	1929	31	1931	32	1935	42	43	1945
Denbigh	D. Davies	J. Davies	E. Davies		Morris-Jones	→				→	→	
Wrexham	Thomas	Richards		Williams	Richards		Roberts		Richards			
Flintshire	Parry		→	Roberts	Llewellyn-Jones	→		→	Rowlands			Birch

=== 1950 to 1983 ===
Conservative Labour National Liberal (1931–68) Social Democratic

Constituency	1950	1951	55	1955	1959	1964	1966	1970	Feb 1974	Oct 1974	1979	81
Denbigh	Evans				Morgan							
Wrexham	Richards		Jones					Ellis				→
Flintshire West	Birch							Meyer				
Flintshire East	White							Jones				

=== 1983 to 2010 ===
Conservative Labour

Constituency	1983	1987	1992	1997	2001	2005
Alyn and Deeside	B. Jones				Tami	
Clwyd South West / Clwyd South (1997)	Harvey	M. Jones				
Clwyd North West / Clwyd West (1997)	Meyer		Richards	Thomas		D. Jones
Delyn	Raffan		Hanson			
Wrexham	Marek				Lucas	
Vale of Clwyd				Ruane		

=== 2010 to present ===
Conservative Independent Labour

Constituency	2010	2015	2017	19	2019	21	2024
Aberconwy^{1} / Bangor Aberconwy (2024)^{2}	Bebb			→	Millar		Hughes
Alyn and Deeside	Tami						
Clwyd South^{3}	S. Jones				Baynes		N/A
Clwyd West	D. Jones						N/A
Delyn / Clwyd East (2024)	Hanson				Roberts	→	Gittins
Wrexham	Lucas				Atherton		Ranger
Vale of Clwyd / Clwyd North (2024)	Ruane	Davies	Ruane		Davies		German
Montgomeryshire and Glyndŵr	Not in Clwyd						Witherden

^{1}In 2003 this area was moved from the preserved county of Gwynedd to the preserved county of Clwyd. The predecessor to the Aberconwy seat, Conway (Conwy from 1983) therefore is tabulated with the Gwynedd constituencies until 2010.

^{2}contains some areas (formerly in the Arfon constituency) which are part of Gwynedd.

^{3}abolished 2024; some areas transferred to constituencies which lie primarily in Gwynedd and Powys

== See also ==
- List of parliamentary constituencies in Wales
- List of parliamentary constituencies in Dyfed
- List of parliamentary constituencies in Gwynedd
- List of parliamentary constituencies in Powys
- Senedd constituencies and electoral regions
