= Glyn Tegai Hughes =

Welsh scholar and politician

Glyn Tegai Hughes (18 January 1923 – 10 March 2017) was a Welsh scholar, writer and literary critic. He was a Liberal Party politician and Welsh nationalist.

== Background ==
Hughes is the son of a Welsh Methodist minister, Rev. John Hughes, and Keturah Hughes. He was educated at Newtown and Towyn County School, the Liverpool Institute and Manchester Grammar School. In 1942 he became a Methodist local preacher.

From 1942 to 1946 he served with the Royal Welch Fusiliers and became deputy assistant adjutant-general at the headquarters of the land forces in South-East Asia. After the war, he attended university at Corpus Christi College, Cambridge, where he gained a Schol., MA, PhD.

In 1957 he married Margaret Vera Herbert of Brisbane, Queensland; they had two sons. She died in 1996.

== Political career ==
While at university he became involved in politics as a supporter of the Liberal Party. In 1948 he served as president of Cambridge University Liberal Club. He was also chairman of the Union of University Liberal Societies. In 1950 at the age of 26, he was Liberal candidate for the Denbigh Division at the 1950 general election. This was one of the Liberal Party's most promising seats. His main opponent, Garner Evans, had been his predecessor as Liberal candidate in 1945. Despite achieving a swing of 4.7%, it was not enough for him to win.

General election 1950 Electorate 54,614
| Party | Candidate | Votes | % | ±% |
|---|---|---|---|---|
| National Liberal | Emlyn Hugh Garner Evans | 17,473 | 38.9 | −2.8 |
| Liberal | Dr Glyn Tegai Hughes | 16,264 | 36.2 | +6.6 |
| Labour | J. G. Hughes | 11,205 | 24.9 | −3.8 |
| Majority | | 1,209 | 2.7 | −9.4 |
| Turnout | | | | |
| National Liberal hold | | Swing | -4.7 | |

=== Parliament for Wales ===
In 1950 Hughes was a founding member of Undeb Cymru Fydd, an all-party organisation that was created to campaign for a parliament for Wales. Apart from Hughes, the organisation had support from many other leading Welsh Liberals such as Emrys Roberts and Megan Lloyd George who served as the organisation's president. The campaign strategy involved the collection of a nationwide petition to present to the British parliament. The campaign also involved the holding of public meetings at which Hughes was a regular platform speaker. He was critical of how the organisation was created without any full-time staff and of the way the campaign was launched. Although the petition was signed by 250,000 people he did not think that this truly reflected the degree of support in Wales for their own parliament and believed that a referendum on the issue in the 1950s would have been lost. The overwhelming majority of Welsh MPs in the 1950s were Labour Party members who opposed the campaign. When the petition was presented to Parliament before the 1955 general election there was also a debate on the issue of creating a Welsh Parliament that was also backed by Liberal Party Leader Clement Davies. However, due to the combined votes of Conservative and Labour MPs, the bill was defeated. He continued his involvement with Undeb Cymru Fydd, serving as its chairman from 1968 to 1970.

He did not contest the 1951 general election as he was working in Switzerland at the time. He became active in the Liberal Party nationally being elected a member of the Liberal Party Council and of the party's national executive. In 1955 he was again Liberal candidate for Denbigh. In Hughes' absence, not only had Garner Evans managed to increase his majority, but the Liberals had slipped to third place. Hughes managed to increase the Liberal vote and re-establish the party as the main challenger again.

General election 1955 Electorate 53,589
| Party | Candidate | Votes | % | ±% |
|---|---|---|---|---|
| National Liberal | Emlyn Hugh Garner Evans | 18,312 | 43.2 | |
| Liberal | Dr Glyn Tegai Hughes | 13,671 | 32.2 | |
| Labour | J Robyn J Lewis | 10,421 | 24.6 | |
| Majority | | 4,641 | 11.0 | |
| Turnout | | | 79.1 | |
| National Liberal hold | | Swing | | |

He served as chairman of the Welsh Liberal Party. In 1959 he stood as Liberal candidate for the third and final time. During the campaign he was one of the Liberal Party's featured leaders, along with Robin Day and John Arlott in the televised party election broadcast shown on 22 September 1959, speaking predominantly in Welsh to a predominantly English-speaking audience. However, his hopes of finally gaining the seat were dashed by the intervention of a Plaid Cymru candidate who split the Welsh nationalist vote.

General election 1959 Electorate 53,000
| Party | Candidate | Votes | % | ±% |
|---|---|---|---|---|
| Conservative | William Geraint Oliver Morgan | 17,893 | 41.7 | −1.5 |
| Liberal | Dr Glyn Tegai Hughes | 13,268 | 31.0 | −1.2 |
| Labour | Stanley Williams | 8,620 | 20.1 | −4.5 |
| Plaid Cymru | Dr Dafydd Alun Jones | 3,077 | 7.2 | n/a |
| Majority | | 4,625 | 10.7 | −0.3 |
| Turnout | | | 80.9 | |
| Conservative hold | | Swing | | |

In 1967 he became a Member of the Welsh Arts Council, serving until 1976. In 1971 he was appointed national governor for Wales BBC and chairman of the Broadcasting Council for Wales, serving in these roles until 1979. In 1977 he became vice-president of the North Wales Arts Association, serving until 1994. In 1980 he became a member of the Board of the Channel Four Television Company, on which he sat until 1987. In 1981 he became a member of the Welsh Fourth TV Channel Authority, serving until 1987. In 1988 he became chairman of the Welsh Broadcasting Trust, serving until 1996.

== Academic career ==
In 1951 Hughes was appointed as a lecturer in English at the University of Basel, Switzerland. In 1953 he was appointed as a lecturer in Comparative Literary Studies at the University of Manchester. From 1964 to 1989 he was warden of the Gregynog Centre, University of Wales. In 2000 he was made a fellow of the University of Wales Aberystwyth. In 2004 he was made an honorary fellow of the University of Wales Bangor.

== Publications ==
- Eichendorffs Taugenichts, 1961
- Romantic German Literature, 1979
- (edited) Life of Thomas Olivers, 1979
- Williams Pantycelyn, 1983
- (with David Esslemont) Gwasg Gregynog: a descriptive catalogue, 1990
- Islwyn, 2003
- (edited) The Romantics in Wales, 2009
- various articles in learned journals and Welsh language periodicals

== See also ==
- 1991 in Wales
- William Williams Pantycelyn
- Cowbridge Grammar School
