= Eifion Roberts =

British judge and politician (1927–2019)

Hugh Eifion Pritchard Roberts, also known as Eifion Roberts (22 November 1927 – 15 September 2019), was a British circuit judge and Liberal Party politician.

== Background ==
He was the elder son of the Rev. and Mrs E.P. Roberts of Anglesey and his younger brother was the politician Wyn Roberts. He was educated at Beaumaris Grammar School and the University College of Wales, Aberystwyth, where he received an LLB with honours, He interrupted his studies to serve as a flying officer in the Royal Air Force education branch. He returned to his studies at Exeter College, Oxford where he obtained a BCL. In 1951 he again interrupted his studies, this time to stand as Liberal candidate for the Denbigh Division at the 1951 General Election. Without having the opportunity to nurse the constituency, he was not able to prevent the Liberals from dropping to third place;

General election 1951 Electorate 54,011
Party	Candidate	Votes	%	±%
National Liberal	Emlyn Hugh Garner Evans	20,269	45.7	+6.8
Labour	James I. Jones	12,354	27.8	+2.9
Liberal	Hugh Eifion Pritchard Roberts	11,758	26.5	−9.7
Majority		7,915	17.9	+15.2
Turnout			82.2	
National Liberal hold		Swing	n/a	

He did not stand for parliament again.

== Professional career ==
In 1953 he was called to the bar, after being in Gray's Inn. He practised as a Junior Counsel on the Wales and Chester Circuit from September 1953–April 1971. He was Deputy Chairman of the Anglesey Quarter-Session from 1966 to 1971 and the Denbighshire Quarter-Session from 1970 to 1971. In 1971 he was appointed a Queen's Counsel. He was a Recorder of the Crown Court from 1972 to 1977. He was Assistant Parliamentary Boundary Commissioner for Wales and a Member for Wales of the Crawford Committee on Broadcasting Coverage. In 1977 he was appointed a Circuit Judge. He retired in 1998.

He married, in 1958, Buddug Williams. They had one son and two daughters. In 2009 he was made an Honorary Fellow of Bangor University.

He died on 15 September 2019 at Wrexham Maelor Hospital. His funeral was held at Penygarnedd Chapel, Pentraeth on 30 September 2019 with the burial at Menai Cemetery, Menai Bridge.
