= John Cledwyn Davies =

Welsh politician (1869–1952)

John Cledwyn Davies (1869 – 31 December 1952) was a Welsh Liberal Party politician, educationist and lawyer.

== Education ==
Davies was educated at Llanrwst Grammar School, University College, Bangor and London University where he gained his MA degree.

== Career ==
Davies was called to the Bar at the Middle Temple but spent much of his career in education as a teacher and administrator. His most senior positions were as Headmaster of Holywell Secondary School, Flintshire and then as Director of Education for the county of Denbighshire. He was a Member of Court of the University of Wales as well as being a Member of the University Council and of its Finance Committee. He was a member of the Welsh Joint Education Committee and a member of a number of governing bodies of various schools in Wales.

== Politics ==
Davies was for a time a member of Denbighshire County Council and its Education Committee. He also served as a justice of the peace. He emerged more publicly into the political light at the 1922 general election against the background of the continuing split in the Liberal Party between the followers of David Lloyd George and H H Asquith. Davies was adopted as National Liberal (i.e. Lloyd George) candidate for the constituency of Denbigh. He stood down temporarily from his post as Director of Education to be able to stand for Parliament and was opposed in the election by Llewellyn G Williams standing for the Asquithian Liberals and a Conservative the Honourable Mrs Broderick. The 1922 election was bad for Liberals of both persuasions but particularly bad for the former Coalition or National Liberals. According to one historian, only in its stronghold of rural north Wales was Coalition Liberalism able to survive unaided against Conservative and Labour attacks. Davies' experience in the election and his brief stay in the House of Commons was clearly uncongenial to him as he decided not to put himself before the electorate again at the 1923 general election which was won for the then reunited Liberal Party by the former Asquithian Ellis William Davies. By 1929, Denbigh was represented in Parliament, by another Liberal, Dr Henry Morris-Jones. The Liberal Party, who had been part of the National Government formed in 1931, crossed into opposition. However, Morris-Jones along with colleagues in the Liberal National group, decided to remain on the government benches. The Denbigh Liberal Association were unhappy with Morris-Jones and decided to select a new candidate, settling on Davies. At the 1935 General election, Davies came second to Morris-Jones, who was supported by the Conservatives. This Denbigh election marked the first occasion in the United Kingdom when a Liberal National MP was directly opposed by the Liberal Party.

Parliament of the United Kingdom
Preceded by David Sanders Davies	Member of Parliament for Denbigh; 1922 – 1923	Succeeded by Ellis William Davies
