= Denbigh (UK Parliament constituency) =

UK Parliament constituency (1918–1983)

- Former county constituency for the House of Commons
- Preserved county: Denbighshire
- Major settlements: Denbigh

1918–1983
- Created from: Denbigh Boroughs; East Denbighshire; West Denbighshire
- Replaced by: Clwyd North West and Clwyd South West

Denbigh was a county constituency centred on the town of Denbigh in North Wales. It returned one Member of Parliament (MP) to the House of Commons of the Parliament of the United Kingdom, elected by the first-past-the-post voting system.

The constituency was created for the 1918 general election, and abolished for the 1983 general election.

== Boundaries ==
This was a county division of Denbighshire. In 1918 it comprised the whole of the county, except for the Municipal Borough of Wrexham and part of the Chirk Rural District, which formed the Wrexham division.

The local authorities in the Denbigh division were the Municipal Boroughs of Denbigh and Ruthin; the Urban Districts of Abergele and Pensarn, Colwyn Bay and Colwyn, Llangollen, and Llanrwst; and the Rural Districts of Llangollen, Llanrwst, Llansillin, Ruthin, St Asaph (Denbigh), and Uwchaled, part of Chirk, and the part of Glan Conway not in Caernarvonshire.

The local authorities in Denbighshire were reorganised in 1935, but that did not affect the boundaries of the parliamentary constituency.

In the redistribution which took effect in 1950, the division was redefined as comprising the Municipal Boroughs of Colwyn Bay, Denbigh, and Ruthin; the Urban Districts of Abergele, Llangollen, and Llanrwst; and the Rural Districts of Aled, Hiraethog, Ruthin, part of Ceiriog, and part of Wrexham. The same local authorities remained within the constituency in the 1974 redistribution.

== Members of Parliament ==
| Election | Member | Party |
|---|---|---|
| 1918 | Sir David Davies | Coalition Liberal |
| Jan 1922 | Sir David Davies | National Liberal^{1} |
| Nov 1922 | John Cledwyn Davies | National Liberal |
| 1923 | Ellis Davies | Liberal |
| 1929 | Sir Henry Morris-Jones | Liberal |
| 1931 | Sir Henry Morris-Jones | Liberal National ^{2} |
| 1942 | Sir Henry Morris-Jones | Independent |
| 1943 | Sir Henry Morris-Jones | Liberal National ^{2} |
| 1950 | Garner Evans | National Liberal ^{2} |
| 1959 | Geraint Morgan | National Liberal ^{2} |
| 1960 | Geraint Morgan | Conservative ^{3} |
| 1983 | constituency abolished | |

^{1} A party led by David Lloyd George, which succeeded the Coalition Liberals.

^{2} A party allied with the Conservative Party.

^{3} Geraint Morgan stood initially as a 'Conservative & National Liberal'.

== Election results ==
=== Elections in the 1910s ===
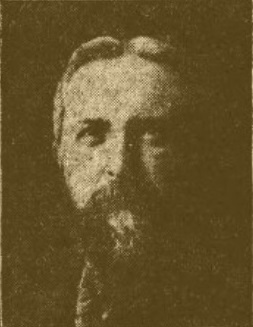
John

General election 1918: Denbigh
| Party | | Candidate | Votes | % |
|---|---|---|---|---|
| C | Coalition Liberal | David Davies | 14,773 | 83.3 |
| | Labour | Edward John | 2,958 | 16.7 |
| Majority | | | 11,815 | 66.6 |
| Turnout | | | 17,731 | 58.2 |
| | National Liberal win (new seat) | | | |
C indicates candidate endorsed by the coalition government.

=== Elections in the 1920s ===
General election 1922: Denbigh
| Party | Candidate | Votes | % | ±% |
|---|---|---|---|---|
| National Liberal | John Cledwyn Davies | 12,975 | 53.9 | −29.4 |
| Unionist | Lesley Venetia Elizabeth Brodrick | 9,138 | 37.9 | New |
| Liberal | Llewellyn G Williams | 1,974 | 8.2 | New |
| Majority | | 3,837 | 16.0 | −50.6 |
| Turnout | | 24,087 | 76.7 | +18.5 |
| National Liberal hold | | Swing | | |

General election 1923: Denbigh
| Party | Candidate | Votes | % | ±% |
|---|---|---|---|---|
| Liberal | Ellis Davies | 12,164 | 59.8 | +51.6 |
| Unionist | Rhys David | 8,186 | 40.2 | +2.3 |
| Majority | | 3,978 | 19.6 | N/A |
| Turnout | | 20,350 | 63.6 | −13.1 |
| Liberal hold | | Swing | +24.8 | |

General election 1924: Denbigh
| Party | Candidate | Votes | % | ±% |
|---|---|---|---|---|
| Liberal | Ellis Davies | 12,671 | 53.0 | −6.8 |
| Unionist | Lesley Venetia Elizabeth Brodrick | 11,250 | 47.0 | +6.8 |
| Majority | | 1,421 | 6.0 | −13.6 |
| Turnout | | 23,921 | 79.7 | +16.1 |
| Liberal hold | | Swing | -6.8 | |

General election 1929: Denbigh
| Party | Candidate | Votes | % | ±% |
|---|---|---|---|---|
| Liberal | Henry Morris-Jones | 21,305 | 61.9 | +8.9 |
| Unionist | Alan Graham | 13,116 | 38.1 | −8.9 |
| Majority | | 8,189 | 23.8 | +17.8 |
| Turnout | | 34,421 | 79.7 | 0.0 |
| Liberal hold | | Swing | +8.9 | |

=== Elections in the 1930s ===
General election 1931: Denbigh
| Party | Candidate | Votes | % | ±% |
|---|---|---|---|---|
| National Liberal | Henry Morris-Jones | Unopposed | | |
| National Liberal gain from Liberal | | | | |
| Registered electors | | 44,614 | | |

General election 1935: Denbigh
| Party | Candidate | Votes | % | ±% |
|---|---|---|---|---|
| National Liberal | Henry Morris-Jones | 17,372 | 50.12 | N/A |
| Liberal | John Cledwyn Davies | 12,329 | 35.57 | N/A |
| Labour | J. R. Hughes | 4,963 | 14.32 | New |
| Majority | | 5,043 | 14.55 | N/A |
| Turnout | | 34,664 | 75.10 | N/A |
| Registered electors | | 46,158 | | |
| National Liberal hold | | Swing | N/A | |

=== Elections in the 1940s ===
General Election 1939–40: Another General Election was due to take place before the end of 1940. From 1939, the parties had been making preparations for an election, and by the end of that year, the following candidates had been selected:

- Liberal National: Henry Morris-Jones
- Liberal: Garner Evans
- Labour: J. R. Hughes

General election 1945: Denbigh
| Party | Candidate | Votes | % | ±% |
|---|---|---|---|---|
| National Liberal | Henry Morris-Jones | 17,023 | 41.70 | −8.42 |
| Liberal | Garner Evans | 12,101 | 29.64 | −5.93 |
| Labour | William Mars-Jones | 11,702 | 28.66 | +14.34 |
| Majority | | 4,922 | 12.06 | −2.49 |
| Turnout | | 40,826 | 74.81 | −0.29 |
| Registered electors | | 54,572 | | |
| National Liberal hold | | Swing | -1.25 | |

=== Elections in the 1950s ===
General election 1950: Denbigh
| Party | Candidate | Votes | % | ±% |
|---|---|---|---|---|
| National Liberal | Garner Evans | 17,473 | 38.88 | −2.82 |
| Liberal | Glyn Tegai Hughes | 16,264 | 36.19 | +6.55 |
| Labour | John G Hughes | 11,205 | 24.93 | −3.73 |
| Majority | | 1,209 | 2.69 | −9.37 |
| Turnout | | 44,942 | 82.29 | +7.48 |
| Registered electors | | 54,614 | | |
| National Liberal hold | | Swing | -4.69 | |

General election 1951: Denbigh
| Party | Candidate | Votes | % | ±% |
|---|---|---|---|---|
| National Liberal | Garner Evans | 20,269 | 45.67 | +6.79 |
| Labour | Idwal Jones | 12,354 | 27.84 | +2.91 |
| Liberal | Eifion Roberts | 11,758 | 26.49 | −9.70 |
| Majority | | 7,915 | 17.83 | +15.14 |
| Turnout | | 44,381 | 82.17 | −0.12 |
| Registered electors | | 54,011 | | |
| National Liberal hold | | Swing | +1.94 | |

General election 1955: Denbigh
| Party | Candidate | Votes | % | ±% |
|---|---|---|---|---|
| National Liberal | Garner Evans | 18,312 | 43.18 | −2.49 |
| Liberal | Glyn Tegai Hughes | 13,671 | 32.24 | +5.75 |
| Labour | Robyn Lewis | 10,421 | 24.58 | −3.26 |
| Majority | | 4,641 | 10.94 | −6.89 |
| Turnout | | 42,404 | 79.13 | −3.04 |
| Registered electors | | 53,589 | | |
| National Liberal hold | | Swing | -4.12 | |

General election 1959: Denbigh
| Party | Candidate | Votes | % | ±% |
|---|---|---|---|---|
| National Liberal | Geraint Morgan | 17,893 | 41.75 | −1.43 |
| Liberal | Glyn Tegai Hughes | 13,268 | 30.96 | −1.28 |
| Labour | Stanley Williams | 8,620 | 20.11 | −4.47 |
| Plaid Cymru | Dafydd Alun Jones | 3,077 | 7.18 | New |
| Majority | | 4,625 | 10.79 | −0.15 |
| Turnout | | 42,858 | 80.86 | +1.73 |
| Registered electors | | 53,000 | | |
| National Liberal hold | | Swing | -0.08 | |

=== Elections in the 1960s ===
General election 1964: Denbigh
| Party | Candidate | Votes | % | ±% |
|---|---|---|---|---|
| Conservative | Geraint Morgan | 17,970 | 41.31 | −0.44 |
| Liberal | William BE Ellis-Jones | 13,331 | 30.65 | −0.31 |
| Labour | Stanley Williams | 8,754 | 20.12 | +0.01 |
| Plaid Cymru | Dafydd Alun Jones | 3,444 | 7.92 | +0.74 |
| Majority | | 4,639 | 10.66 | −0.13 |
| Turnout | | 43,499 | 80.51 | −0.35 |
| Registered electors | | 54,032 | | |
| Conservative hold | | Swing | -0.07 | |

General election 1966: Denbigh
| Party | Candidate | Votes | % | ±% |
|---|---|---|---|---|
| Conservative | Geraint Morgan | 17,382 | 39.41 | −1.90 |
| Liberal | Alun Talfan Davies | 12,725 | 28.85 | −1.80 |
| Labour | Edward Griffiths | 11,305 | 25.63 | +5.51 |
| Plaid Cymru | Meredith Edwards | 2,695 | 6.11 | −1.81 |
| Majority | | 4,657 | 10.56 | −0.10 |
| Turnout | | 44,107 | 80.61 | +0.10 |
| Registered electors | | 54,715 | | |
| Conservative hold | | Swing | -0.05 | |

=== Elections in the 1970s ===
General election 1970: Denbigh
| Party | Candidate | Votes | % | ±% |
|---|---|---|---|---|
| Conservative | Geraint Morgan | 21,246 | 44.6 | +5.2 |
| Labour | Ann Clwyd | 12,537 | 26.3 | +0.7 |
| Liberal | Idris Hughes-Evans | 8,636 | 18.1 | −10.7 |
| Plaid Cymru | Edward Gwyn Matthews | 5,254 | 11.0 | +4.9 |
| Majority | | 8,709 | 18.3 | +7.7 |
| Turnout | | 47,673 | 78.5 | −2.1 |
| Conservative hold | | Swing | | |

General election February 1974: Denbigh
| Party | Candidate | Votes | % | ±% |
|---|---|---|---|---|
| Conservative | Geraint Morgan | 21,258 | 41.89 | −2.68 |
| Liberal | David Leonard Williams | 15,243 | 30.04 | +11.92 |
| Labour | Emlyn Jones Sherrington | 10,141 | 19.98 | −6.32 |
| Plaid Cymru | Edward Gwyn Matthews | 4,103 | 8.09 | −2.93 |
| Majority | | 6,015 | 11.85 | −6.42 |
| Turnout | | 50,745 | 80.54 | +2.08 |
| Conservative hold | | Swing | | |

General election October 1974: Denbigh
| Party | Candidate | Votes | % | ±% |
|---|---|---|---|---|
| Conservative | Geraint Morgan | 18,751 | 38.64 | −3.25 |
| Liberal | David Leonard Williams | 14,200 | 29.26 | −0.78 |
| Labour | Paul Flynn | 9,824 | 20.24 | +0.26 |
| Plaid Cymru | Ieuan Wyn Jones | 5,754 | 11.86 | +3.77 |
| Majority | | 4,551 | 9.38 | −2.47 |
| Turnout | | 48,529 | 76.43 | −4.11 |
| Conservative hold | | Swing | -1.24 | |

General election 1979: Denbigh
| Party | Candidate | Votes | % | ±% |
|---|---|---|---|---|
| Conservative | Geraint Morgan | 23,683 | 44.93 | +6.29 |
| Liberal | David Leonard Williams | 14,833 | 28.14 | −1.12 |
| Labour | Huw Rhys Thomas | 9,276 | 17.60 | −2.64 |
| Plaid Cymru | Ieuan Wyn Jones | 4,915 | 9.33 | −2.53 |
| Majority | | 8,850 | 16.79 | +7.41 |
| Turnout | | 52,707 | 79.98 | +3.55 |
| Conservative hold | | Swing | +3.71 | |

== See also ==
- Denbighshire (UK Parliament constituency) (abolished 1885)
- East Denbighshire (UK Parliament constituency) (1885–1918)
- West Denbighshire (UK Parliament constituency) (1885–1918)
