= Ceiriog =

Ceiriog is a Welsh name. It may refer to:

- River Ceiriog
  - The Ceiriog Valley
- Ceiriog, the bardic name of John Ceiriog Hughes (1832–87)
- Ceiriog Rural District, a former rural district in Denbighshire (historic), Wales from 1935 to 1974
