= Aberderfyn Halt railway station =

Disused railway station in Ponciau, Wrexham

Aberderfyn

General information
- Location: Ponciau, Wrexham; Wales
- Coordinates: 53.0123°N 3.0466°W
- Grid reference: SJ298466
- Platforms: 1

Other information
- Status: Disused

History
- Original company: Great Western Railway
- Pre-grouping: Great Western Railway

Key dates
- 5 June 1905: Station opened
- 22 March 1915: Station closed
- 1917: Line to Legacy closed completely
Location

Aberderfyn Halt railway station served the Aberderfyn Road area of Ponciau, a village that lies within the community of Rhosllanerchrugog. Opened in 1905 the halt had closed by 1915, partly as a result of WWI and also through road transport competition. On 1 August 1861 the GWR had opened a mineral branch from just north of Ruabon to serve the blast furnaces of the iron works at Aberderfyn and Ponciau. This line was extended to the village of Legacy on 27 August 1876.

== History ==
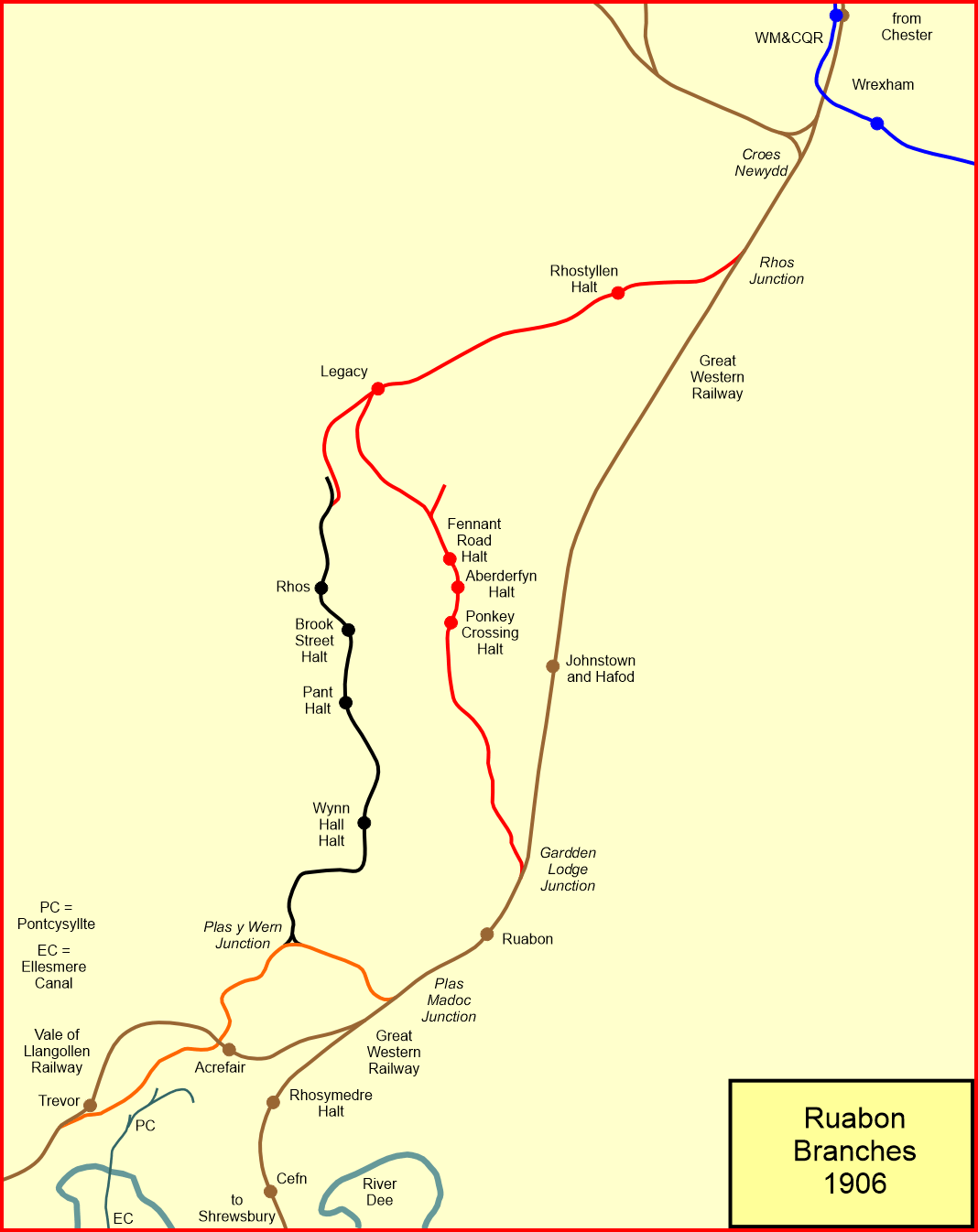
The branch lines of Ruabon in 1906

The station opened in June 1905 on the Wrexham to Ponkey (Ponciau) Branch of the Great Western Railway. It was one of three halts on the line south from Wrexham and Legacy, the others being at Fennant Road and Ponkey Crossing.

The Ponkey (Ponciau) Crossing Halt to Legacy Halt line closed to all traffic on 18 January 1917 whilst the Ruabon portion of the Ponkey (Ponciau) branch continued to serve private sidings.

== Services ==
To try and cater for falling passenger numbers railmotors were introduced on 1 May 1905. These consisted of a carriage with a miniature locomotive at one end, partly contained within the body of the coach. Passenger services never ran south to Ruabon as indicated by the 1919-1924 map which shows a mineral line running south from Ponkey Crossing Halt.

The 1906 timetable shows the line working as the 'Wrexham and Ponkey Crossing' branch, served by railmotors on weekdays only and only accommodating a single class. Trains from Wrexham first stopped at Rhostyllen and then Legacy before running down to Fennant Road and Ponkey Crossing. An impressive fifteen trains a day ran in each direction, roughly one an hour, with a short stop over at Ponkey Crossing before returning to Wrexham. The three halts were very close to each other with two minutes allowed between Fennant Road and Aberderfyn and only a single minute between Aberderfyn and Ponkey Crossing.

== Infrastructure ==
The halt was located on a single track section of track just south of Aberderfyn Road and its level crossing.

== The site today ==
Few signs remain of the trackbed to the north however on the southern side of Aberderfyn Road the station footprint is covered with trees and undergrowth (datum 2019).

== Sources ==
- Butt, R. V. J. (October 1995). The Directory of Railway Stations: details every public and private passenger station, halt, platform and stopping place, past and present (1st ed.). Sparkford: Patrick Stephens Ltd. ISBN 978-1-85260-508-7. OCLC 60251199. OL 11956311M.

| Preceding station | Historical railways | Following station |
|---|---|---|
| Fennant Road Halt | Great Western Railway; Wrexham and Ponkey Crossing | Ponkey Crossing Halt |
