= Ponkey Crossing Halt railway station =

Former railway station in Wrexham, Wales

Ponkey Crossing

General information
- Location: Ponciau, Wrexham; Wales
- Coordinates: 53.0099°N 3.0466°W
- Grid reference: SJ298463
- Platforms: 1

Other information
- Status: Disused

History
- Original company: Great Western Railway
- Pre-grouping: Great Western Railway

Key dates
- 5 June 1905: Station opened
- 22 March 1915: Station closed
- 1917: Line to Legacy closed completely
Location

Ponkey Crossing Halt railway station served the southern area of Ponciau, a village that lies within the community of Rhosllanerchrugog in Wales. Opened in 1905, it had closed by 1915, partly as a result of WWI and also due to road transport competition. On 1 August 1861, the Great Western Railway had opened a mineral branch from just north of Ruabon to serve the blast furnaces of the iron works at Aberderfyn and Ponciau. The line was extended to Legacy on 27 August 1876.

== History ==
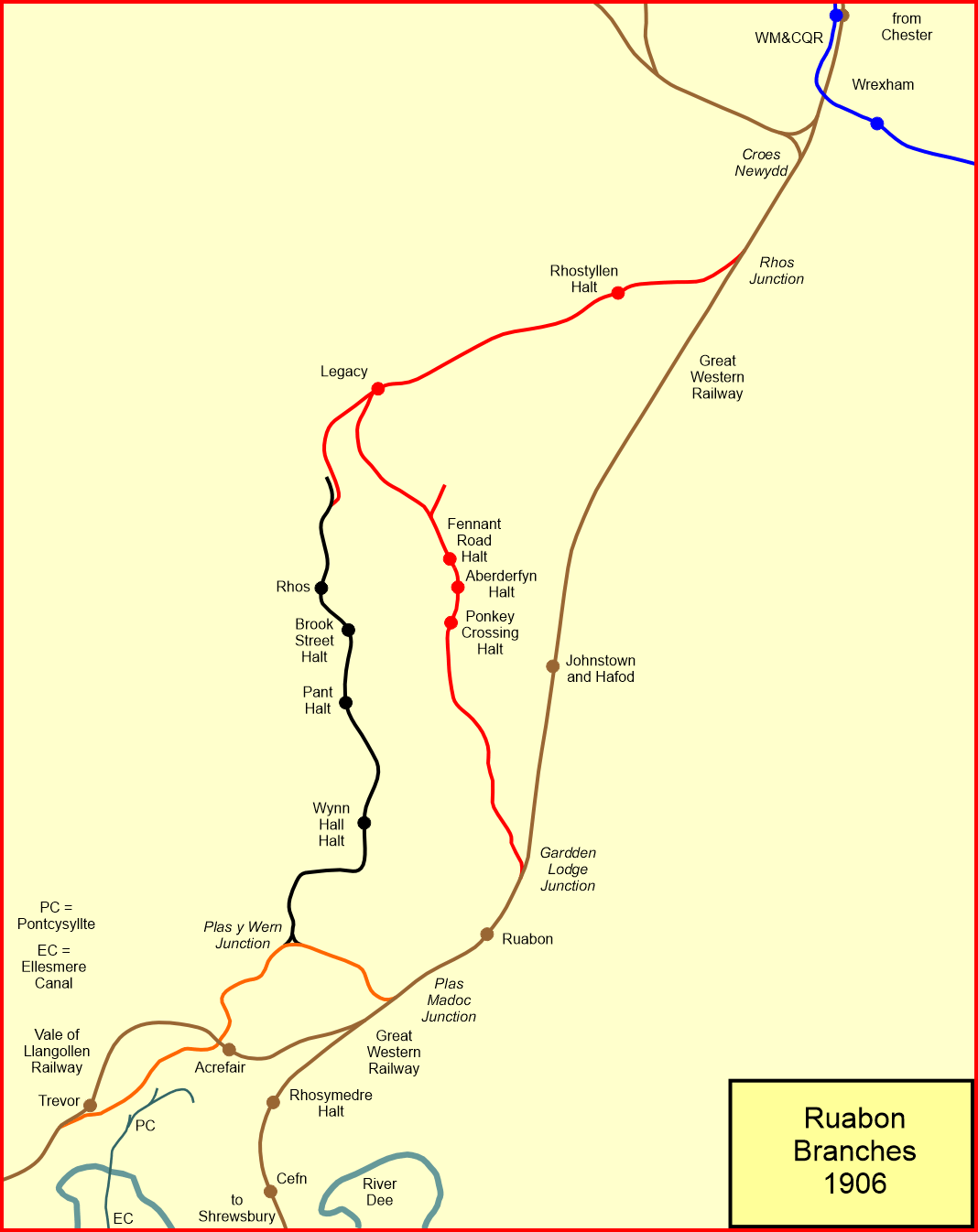
The branch lines of Ruabon in 1906

The station opened in June 1905 on the Wrexham to Ponkey (Ponciau) Branch of the Great Western Railway. It was one of three halts on the line south from Wrexham and Legacy, the others being at Aberderfyn and Fennant Road.

The Ponkey (Ponciau) to Legacy line closed to all traffic on 18 January 1917 whilst the Ruabon portion of the Ponkey (Ponciau) branch continued to serve private sidings.

== Services ==
As a response cater to falling passenger numbers, railmotors were introduced on 1 May 1905. They consisted of a carriage with a miniature locomotive at one end, partly contained within the body of the coach. Passenger services never ran south to Ruabon, as indicated by the 1919–1924 map, which shows a mineral line running south from Ponkey (Ponciau) Crossing.

The 1906 timetable shows the line working as the "Wrexham and Ponkey Crossing" branch, served by rail motors on weekdays only and accommodating only a single class. Trains from Wrexham first stopped at Rhostyllen and Legacy before running down to Fennant Road, Aberderfyn and Ponkey Crossing. An impressive fifteen trains a day ran in each direction, roughly one an hour, with a short stop over at Ponkey Crossing before returning to Wrexham. The three halts were very close to each other, with two minutes allowed between Fennant Road and Aberderfyn, and only a single minute between Aberderfyn and Ponkey Crossing.

== Infrastructure ==
Ponkey Crossing Halt was located on a single track section of the line with a level crossing at the road to Johnstown. Given the early morning and late evening train times, lighting would have been provided at the halts.

== The site today ==
Few signs remain of the line to the north due to construction of buildings, but sections of the track bed remain to the south (datum 2019).

== Notes ==
Preceding station	Historical railways	Following station
Aberderfyn Halt	Great Western Railway; Wrexham and Ponkey Crossing	Terminus
