= Wrexham (UK Parliament constituency) =

UK Parliament constituency (1918–)

Coordinates: 53°04′34″N 2°56′59″W

- County constituency for the House of Commons
- Boundary of Wrexham in Wales
- Preserved county: Clwyd
- Electorate: 70,964 (March 2020)
- Major settlements: Wrexham, Gwersyllt, Llay, Gresford

Current constituency
- Created: 1918
- Member of Parliament: Andrew Ranger (Labour)
- Seats: One
- Created from: Denbigh Boroughs and East Denbighshire

Overlaps
- Senedd: Fflint Wrecsam

Wrexham (Welsh: Wrecsam) is a parliamentary constituency (Note: A borough constituency (for the purposes of election expenses and type of returning officer)) centred on the city of Wrexham in the preserved county of Clwyd, Wales in the United Kingdom. It was created in 1918, and is represented in the House of Commons of the UK Parliament since 2024 by Andrew Ranger of the Labour Party. (Note: As with all constituencies, the constituency elects one Member of Parliament (MP) by the first past the post system of election at least every five years)

The constituency retained its name and gained wards, as part of the 2023 review of Westminster constituencies and under the June 2023 final recommendations of the Boundary Commission for Wales for the 2024 general election.

== History ==
Summary of results

Labour won the seat in all general elections from 1935 until 2019, when Conservative Sarah Atherton became the first woman elected to represent Wrexham. This result was reversed in 2024 when Andrew Ranger regained the seat for Labour.

Tom Ellis, first elected in 1970, defected in 1981 to the newly founded Social Democratic Party. In 1983, he unsuccessfully stood for Clwyd South West instead.

Turnout

Turnout has ranged between 57.5% in 2024 and 87.3% in 1950.

== Boundaries ==
Until 1885, Wrexham was part of the Denbighshire parliamentary constituency, which elected one Member of Parliament until the Reform Act 1832 increased this to two members. In 1885 the Denbighshire constituency was split — the area covered today became part of East Denbighshire constituency.

In 1918 the Wrexham constituency was created, electing one Member of Parliament.

1918–1949: The Municipal Borough of Wrexham, and the Rural District of Wrexham, and part of Chirk.

1950–1983: The Municipal Borough of Wrexham, and part of the Rural Districts of Ceiriog, and Wrexham.

1983–1997: The Borough of Wrexham Maelor wards Nos. 1 to 12, 23 to 25 and 28 to 36.

For the 1983 general election, major boundary reorganisation saw large areas removed from the Wrexham constituency to form part of the new constituency of Clwyd South West.

Map of boundaries 1997-2024

1997–2010: The Borough of Wrexham Maelor wards of Acton, Borras Park, Caia Park, Garden Village, Gresford East and West, Grosvenor, Gwersyllt East and South, Gwersyllt North, Gwersyllt West, Holt, Little Acton, Llay, Maesydre, Marford and Hoseley, Offa East, Offa West, Queensway, Rhosnesni, Rossett, Stansty, and Whitegate. Further parts included in the new constituency of Clwyd South (which replaced Clwyd South West).

Map of current boundaries

2010–2024: The following County Borough of Wrexham wards: Acton, Borras Park, Brynyffynnon, Cartrefle, Erddig, Garden Village, Gresford East and West, Grosvenor, Gwersyllt East and South, Gwersyllt North, Gwersyllt West, Hermitage, Holt, Little Acton, Llay, Maesydre, Marford and Hoseley, Offa, Queensway, Rhosnesni, Rossett, Smithfield, Stansty, Whitegate, Wynnstay.

No changes to boundaries.

2024–present: Under the 2023 boundary review, drawn up in accordance with the ward structure in existence on 1 December 2020, the constituency was defined as comprising the wards above, plus Bronington, Brymbo, Bryn Cefn, Coedpoeth, Gwenfro, Marchwiel, Minera, New Broughton, and Overton, transferred from the now abolished Clwyd South constituency.

Following a local government boundary review which came into effect in May 2022, the constituency now comprises the following wards of the County Borough of Wrexham from the 2024 general election:

- Acton and Maesydre; Bangor Is-y-Coed; Borras Park; Bronington and Hanmer; Brymbo; Bryn Cefn; Brynyffynnon; Cartrefle; Coedpoeth; Erddig; Garden Village; Gresford East and West; Grosvenor; Gwenfro; Gwersyllt East; Gwersyllt North; Gwersyllt South; Gwersyllt West; Hermitage; Holt; Little Acton; Llay; Marchwiel; Marford and Hoseley; Minera; New Broughton; Offa; Overton and Maelor South; Queensway; Rhosnesni; Rossett; Smithfield; Stansty; Whitegate; Wynnstay.

== Members of Parliament ==
Election	Member	Party
1918	Sir Robert Thomas	Coalition Liberal
1922	Robert Richards	Labour
1924	Christmas Price Williams	Liberal
1929	Robert Richards	Labour
1931	Aled Roberts	Liberal
1935	Robert Richards	Labour
1955	Idwal Jones	Labour
1970	Tom Ellis	Labour
1981	Tom Ellis	SDP
1983	John Marek	Labour
2001	Ian Lucas	Labour
2019	Sarah Atherton	Conservative
2024	Andrew Ranger	Labour

== Elections ==
=== Elections in the 1910s ===
Robert Thomas

General election 1918: Wrexham
Party		Candidate	Votes	%	±%
C	Liberal	Robert Thomas	20,874	76.3	N/A
	Labour	Hugh Hughes	6,500	23.7	N/A
Majority			14,374	52.6	N/A
Turnout			27,374	69.7	N/A
Registered electors			39,259		
	Liberal win (new seat)				
C indicates candidate endorsed by the coalition government.

=== Elections in the 1920s ===
General election 1922: Wrexham
Party	Candidate	Votes	%	±%
Labour	Robert Richards	11,940	35.8	+12.1
National Liberal	E.R. Davies	10,842	32.6	−43.7
Unionist	R.C.G Roberts	10,508	31.6	N/A
Majority		1,098	3.2	N/A
Turnout		33,290	84.4	+14.7
Registered electors		39,446		
Labour gain from Liberal		Swing	+27.9	

General election 1923: Wrexham
Party	Candidate	Votes	%	±%
Labour	Robert Richards	12,918	39.0	+3.2
Liberal	Horace Alexander Morgan	11,037	33.4	+0.8
Unionist	Edmund Fleming Bushby	9,131	27.6	−4.0
Majority		1,881	5.6	+2.4
Turnout		33,086	81.1	−3.3
Registered electors		40,789		
Labour hold		Swing	+1.2	

General election 1924: Wrexham
Party	Candidate	Votes	%	±%
Liberal	Christmas Price Williams	19,154	55.6	+22.2
Labour	Robert Richards	15,291	44.4	+5.4
Majority		3,863	11.2	N/A
Turnout		35,445	82.6	+1.5
Registered electors		41,686		
Liberal gain from Labour		Swing		

General election 1929: Wrexham
Party	Candidate	Votes	%	±%
Labour	Robert Richards	20,584	46.4	+2.0
Liberal	Christmas Price Williams	13,997	31.5	−24.1
Unionist	Edmund Fleming Bushby	9,820	22.1	N/A
Majority		6,587	14.9	N/A
Turnout		44,401	84.9	+2.3
Registered electors		52,310		
Labour gain from Liberal		Swing	+13.0	

=== Elections in the 1930s ===
General election 1931: Wrexham
Party	Candidate	Votes	%	±%
Liberal	Aled Roberts	22,474	52.1	+20.6
Labour	Robert Richards	20,653	47.9	+1.5
Majority		1,821	4.2	N/A
Turnout		43,127	79.8	−5.1
Registered electors		54,048		
Liberal gain from Labour		Swing		

General election 1935: Wrexham
Party	Candidate	Votes	%	±%
Labour	Robert Richards	23,650	56.3	+8.4
Liberal	Aled Roberts	18,367	43.7	−8.4
Majority		5,283	12.6	N/A
Turnout		42,017	75.5	−4.3
Registered electors		55,656		
Labour gain from Liberal		Swing		

=== Election in the 1940s ===
General Election 1939–40: Another general election was required to take place before the end of 1940. The political parties had been making preparations for an election to take place from 1939 and by the end of this year, the following candidates had been selected;

- Labour: Robert Richards
- Liberal:

General election 1945: Wrexham
Party	Candidate	Votes	%	±%
Labour	Robert Richards	26,854	56.0	−0.3
National Liberal	David Leslie Milne	13,714	28.6	N/A
Liberal	John David Williams	6,960	14.5	−29.2
Independent (nationalist)	John Rathbone Hayes-Jones	430	0.9	N/A
Majority		13,140	27.4	+14.8
Turnout		47,958	76.8	+1.3
Registered electors		62,446		
Labour hold		Swing		

=== Elections in the 1950s ===
General election 1950: Wrexham
Party	Candidate	Votes	%	±%
Labour	Robert Richards	32,042	57.8	+1.8
National Liberal	Willoughby Gervase Cooper	14,117	25.5	−3.1
Liberal	Herbert Mostyn Lewis	8,287	15.0	+0.5
Plaid Cymru	Geraint Bowen	960	1.7	N/A
Majority		17,925	32.3	+4.9
Turnout		55,406	87.3	+10.5
Registered electors		63,455		
Labour hold		Swing		

General election 1951: Wrexham
Party	Candidate	Votes	%	±%
Labour	Robert Richards	33,759	61.5	+3.7
National Liberal	Willoughby Gervase Cooper	19,124	34.8	+9.3
Plaid Cymru	A Daniel Thomas	1,997	3.6	+1.9
Majority		14,635	26.7	−5.6
Turnout		54,880	84.8	−2.5
Registered electors		64,736		
Labour hold		Swing		

1955 Wrexham by-election
Party	Candidate	Votes	%	±%
Labour	Idwal Jones	23,402	57.9	−3.6
National Liberal	Griffith Winston Guthrie Jones	12,476	30.8	−4.0
Plaid Cymru	Elystan Morgan	4,572	11.3	+7.7
Majority		10,926	27.1	+0.4
Turnout		46,072	62.4	−22.4
Registered electors		64,788		
Labour hold		Swing		

General election 1955: Wrexham
Party	Candidate	Votes	%	±%
Labour	Idwal Jones	27,945	56.6	−4.9
National Liberal	Griffith Winston Guthrie Jones	16,286	33.0	−1.8
Plaid Cymru	Elystan Morgan	5,139	10.4	+6.8
Majority		11,659	23.6	−3.1
Turnout		49,370	76.2	−8.6
Registered electors		64,788		
Labour hold		Swing		

General election 1959: Wrexham
Party	Candidate	Votes	%	±%
Labour	Idwal Jones	30,101	55.9	−0.7
National Liberal	Griffith Hughes Pierce	17,144	31.9	−1.1
Plaid Cymru	Elystan Morgan	6,579	12.2	+1.8
Majority		12,957	24.0	+0.4
Turnout		53,824	81.4	+5.2
Registered electors		66,150		
Labour hold		Swing		

=== Elections in the 1960s ===
General election 1964: Wrexham
Party	Candidate	Votes	%	±%
Labour	Idwal Jones	30,478	58.2	+2.3
National Liberal	Griffith Hughes Pierce	17,240	32.9	+1.0
Plaid Cymru	John Richard Thomas	4,673	8.9	−3.3
Majority		13,238	25.3	+1.3
Turnout		52,391	78.7	−2.7
Registered electors		66,530		
Labour hold		Swing		

General election 1966: Wrexham
Party	Candidate	Votes	%	±%
Labour	Idwal Jones	30,039	58.6	−0.4
Conservative	Griffith Hughes Pierce	12,596	24.6	−8.3
Liberal	Wilfred McBriar	6,351	12.4	N/A
Plaid Cymru	John Richard Thomas	2,297	4.5	−4.4
Majority		17,443	34.0	+8.7
Turnout		51,283	77.2	−1.5
Registered electors		66,441		
Labour hold		Swing	+4.3	

=== Elections in the 1970s ===
General election 1970: Wrexham
Party	Candidate	Votes	%	±%
Labour	Tom Ellis	31,089	56.8	−1.8
Conservative	Benjamin Patterson	15,649	28.6	+4.0
Liberal	Wilfred McBriar	5,067	9.3	−3.1
Plaid Cymru	Cyril Golding	2,894	5.3	+0.8
Majority		15,440	28.2	−5.8
Turnout		54,699	75.1	−2.1
Registered electors		72,814		
Labour hold		Swing		

General election February 1974: Wrexham
Party	Candidate	Votes	%	±%
Labour	Tom Ellis	27,384	46.7	−10.1
Conservative	John Laurence Pritchard	14,301	24.4	−4.2
Liberal	Martin Thomas	14,297	24.4	+15.1
Plaid Cymru	Hywel Wyn Roberts	2,624	4.5	−0.8
Majority		13,083	22.3	−5.9
Turnout		58,606	77.6	+2.5
Registered electors		75,492		
Labour hold		Swing		

General election October 1974: Wrexham
Party	Candidate	Votes	%	±%
Labour	Tom Ellis	28,885	51.1	+4.4
Liberal	Martin Thomas	12,519	22.1	−2.3
Conservative	John Pritchard	12,251	21.7	−2.7
Plaid Cymru	Hywel Wyn Roberts	2,859	5.1	+0.6
Majority		16,366	29.0	+6.7
Turnout		56,514	74.3	−3.3
Registered electors		76,106		
Labour hold		Swing		

General election 1979: Wrexham
Party	Candidate	Votes	%	±%
Labour	Tom Ellis	30,405	49.2	−1.9
Conservative	Roger Graham-Palmer	18,256	29.6	+7.9
Liberal	Martin Thomas	11,389	18.4	−3.7
Plaid Cymru	Hywel Wyn Roberts	1,740	2.8	−2.3
Majority		12,149	19.6	−9.4
Turnout		56,514	78.4	+4.1
Registered electors		78,771		
Labour hold		Swing		

=== Elections in the 1980s ===
General election 1983: Wrexham
Party	Candidate	Votes	%	±%
Labour	John Marek	16,120	34.3	−14.9
Conservative	Cynthia Kay Wood	15,696	33.4	+3.8
Liberal	Martin Thomas	13,974	29.7	+11.3
Plaid Cymru	John Thomas	1,239	2.6	−0.2
Majority		424	0.9	−18.7
Turnout		47,029	77.5	−0.9
Registered electors		60,707		
Labour hold		Swing	−10.5	

General election 1987: Wrexham
Party	Candidate	Votes	%	±%
Labour	John Marek	22,144	43.9	+9.6
Conservative	Roger Graham-Palmer	17,992	35.6	+2.2
Liberal	Martin Thomas	9,808	19.4	−10.3
Plaid Cymru	Dennis Watkins	539	1.1	−1.5
Majority		4,152	8.3	+7.4
Turnout		50,483	80.9	+3.4
Registered electors		62,401		
Labour hold		Swing	+3.7	

=== Elections in the 1990s ===
General election 1992: Wrexham
Party	Candidate	Votes	%	±%
Labour	John Marek	24,830	48.3	+4.4
Conservative	Owen Paterson	18,114	35.2	−0.4
Liberal Democrats	Andrew Thomas	7,074	13.8	−5.6
Plaid Cymru	Gareth Wheatley	1,415	2.8	+1.7
Majority		6,716	13.1	+4.8
Turnout		51,433	80.7	−0.2
Registered electors		63,720		
Labour hold		Swing	+2.4	

General election 1997: Wrexham
Party	Candidate	Votes	%	±%
Labour	John Marek	20,450	56.1	+6.1
Conservative	Stuart Andrew	8,688	23.9	−8.5
Liberal Democrats	Andrew Thomas	4,833	13.3	−1.7
Referendum	John Cronk	1,195	3.3	N/A
Plaid Cymru	Kevin Plant	1,170	3.2	+0.5
Natural Law	Nicholas Low	86	0.2	N/A
Majority		11,762	32.2	+14.7
Turnout		36,422	71.8	−8.9
Registered electors		50,741		
Labour hold		Swing	+7.4	

=== Elections in the 2000s ===
General election 2001: Wrexham
Party	Candidate	Votes	%	±%
Labour	Ian Lucas	15,934	53.0	−3.1
Conservative	Felicity Elphick	6,746	22.5	−1.4
Liberal Democrats	Ronald Davies	5,153	17.1	+3.8
Plaid Cymru	Malcolm Evans	1,783	5.9	+2.7
UKIP	Jane Brookes	432	1.4	N/A
Majority		9,188	30.5	−1.7
Turnout		30,048	59.5	−12.3
Registered electors		50,465		
Labour hold		Swing	−0.8	

General election 2005: Wrexham
Party	Candidate	Votes	%	±%
Labour	Ian Lucas	13,993	46.1	−6.9
Liberal Democrats	Tom Rippeth	7,174	23.6	+6.5
Conservative	Thérèse Coffey	6,079	20.0	−2.5
Plaid Cymru	Sion Owen	1,744	5.7	−0.2
BNP	John Walker	919	3.0	N/A
Forward Wales	Janet Williams	476	1.6	N/A
Majority		6,819	22.5	−8.0
Turnout		30,385	63.3	+3.8
Registered electors		48,016		
Labour hold		Swing	−6.7	

=== Elections in the 2010s ===
General election 2010: Wrexham
Party	Candidate	Votes	%	±%
Labour	Ian Lucas	12,161	36.9	−9.2
Liberal Democrats	Tom Rippeth	8,503	25.8	+2.2
Conservative	Gareth Hughes	8,375	25.4	+5.4
Plaid Cymru	Arfon Jones	2,029	6.2	+0.5
BNP	Mel Roberts	1,134	3.4	+0.4
UKIP	John Humberstone	774	2.3	N/A
Majority		3,658	11.1	−11.4
Turnout		32,976	64.8	+1.5
Registered electors		50,872		
Labour hold		Swing	−5.7	

General election 2015: Wrexham
Party	Candidate	Votes	%	±%
Labour	Ian Lucas	12,181	37.2	+0.3
Conservative	Andrew Atkinson	10,350	31.6	+6.2
UKIP	Niall Plevin-Kelly	5,072	15.5	+13.2
Plaid Cymru	Carrie Harper	2,501	7.6	+1.4
Liberal Democrats	Rob Walsh	1,735	5.3	−20.5
Green	David Munnerley	669	2.0	N/A
Independent	Brian Edwards	211	0.6	N/A
Rejected ballots		55		
Majority		1,831	5.6	−5.5
Turnout		32,719	64.2	−0.6
Registered electors		50,992		
Labour hold		Swing	−2.9	

Of the 55 rejected ballots:

- 43 were either unmarked or it was uncertain who the vote was for.
- 12 voted for more than one candidate.

General election 2017: Wrexham
Party	Candidate	Votes	%	±%
Labour	Ian Lucas	17,153	48.9	+11.7
Conservative	Andrew Atkinson	15,321	43.7	+12.1
Plaid Cymru	Carrie Harper	1,753	5.0	−2.6
Liberal Democrats	Carole O'Toole	865	2.5	−2.8
Rejected ballots		68		
Majority		1,832	5.2	−0.4
Turnout		35,092	69.6	+5.4
Registered electors		50,245		
Labour hold		Swing	−0.2	

Of the 68 rejected ballots:

- 53 were either unmarked or it was uncertain who the vote was for.
- 15 voted for more than one candidate.

General election 2019: Wrexham
Party	Candidate	Votes	%	±%
Conservative	Sarah Atherton	15,199	45.3	+1.6
Labour Co-op	Mary Wimbury	13,068	39.0	−9.9
Plaid Cymru	Carrie Harper	2,151	6.4	+1.4
Liberal Democrats	Tim Sly	1,447	4.3	+1.8
Brexit Party	Ian Berkeley-Hurst	1,222	3.6	N/A
Green	Duncan Rees	445	1.3	N/A
Majority		2,131	6.3	N/A
Rejected ballots		70		
Turnout		33,532	67.4	−2.2
Registered electors		49,734		
Conservative gain from Labour		Swing	+5.8	

Of the 70 rejected ballots:

- 57 were either unmarked or it was uncertain who the vote was for.
- 9 voted for more than one candidate.
- 4 had writing or mark by which the voter could be identified.

2019 notional result (Note: Estimate of the 2019 general election result as if the revised boundaries recommended under the 2023 boundary review were in place)
Party	Vote	%
Conservative	21,933	46.5
Labour	17,994	38.2
Plaid Cymru	2,960	6.3
Liberal Democrats	2,013	4.3
Brexit Party	1,778	3.8
Green Party	445	0.9
Majority	3,939	8.4
Turnout	47,123	66.4
Electorate	70,964	

=== Elections in the 2020s ===
General election 2024: Wrexham
Party	Candidate	Votes	%	±%
Labour	Andrew Ranger	15,836	39.2	▲1.0
Conservative	Sarah Atherton	9,888	24.5	▼22.0
Reform	Charles Dodman	6,915	17.1	▲13.3
Plaid Cymru	Becca Martin	4,138	10.2	▲3.9
Liberal Democrats	Timothy John Sly	1,777	4.4	▲0.1
Green	Tim Morgan	1,339	3.3	▲2.4
Abolish	Paul Ashton	480	1.2	new
Majority		5,948	14.7	new
Turnout		40,373	57.5	▼9.0
Registered electors		70,269		
Labour gain from Conservative		Swing	▲11.6	

== See also ==
- Wrexham (Senedd constituency)
- List of parliamentary constituencies in Clwyd
- 1955 Wrexham by-election
- List of parliamentary constituencies in Wales
