= 1955 Wrexham by-election =

UK by-election

The 1955 Wrexham by-election was a by-election held on 17 March 1955 for the British House of Commons constituency of Wrexham in Denbighshire, Wales.

The by-election was caused by the death of the town's Labour Party Member of Parliament (MP) Robert Richards, who had held the seat since the 1935 general election.

The result was a victory for the Labour candidate James Idwal Jones, who held the seat with a majority of nearly 11,000 votes.

== Result ==
1955 Wrexham by-election
Party	Candidate	Votes	%	±%
Labour	Idwal Jones	23,402	57.9	−3.6
National Liberal	Griffith Winston Guthrie Jones	12,476	30.8	−4.0
Plaid Cymru	Elystan Morgan	4,572	11.3	+7.7
Majority		10,926	27.0	+0.3
Turnout		46,072	62.4	−22.4
Registered electors		64,788		
Labour hold		Swing		

== See also ==
- List of United Kingdom by-elections
- Wrexham constituency

== Sources ==
- Jones, John Graham (2004). "The Cardiganshire Election of 1966" (PDF). Llafur: Journal of Welsh People's History. 9 (1): 95–106.
