= Ponciau =

Village in Wales

Coordinates: 53.013°N 3.051°W

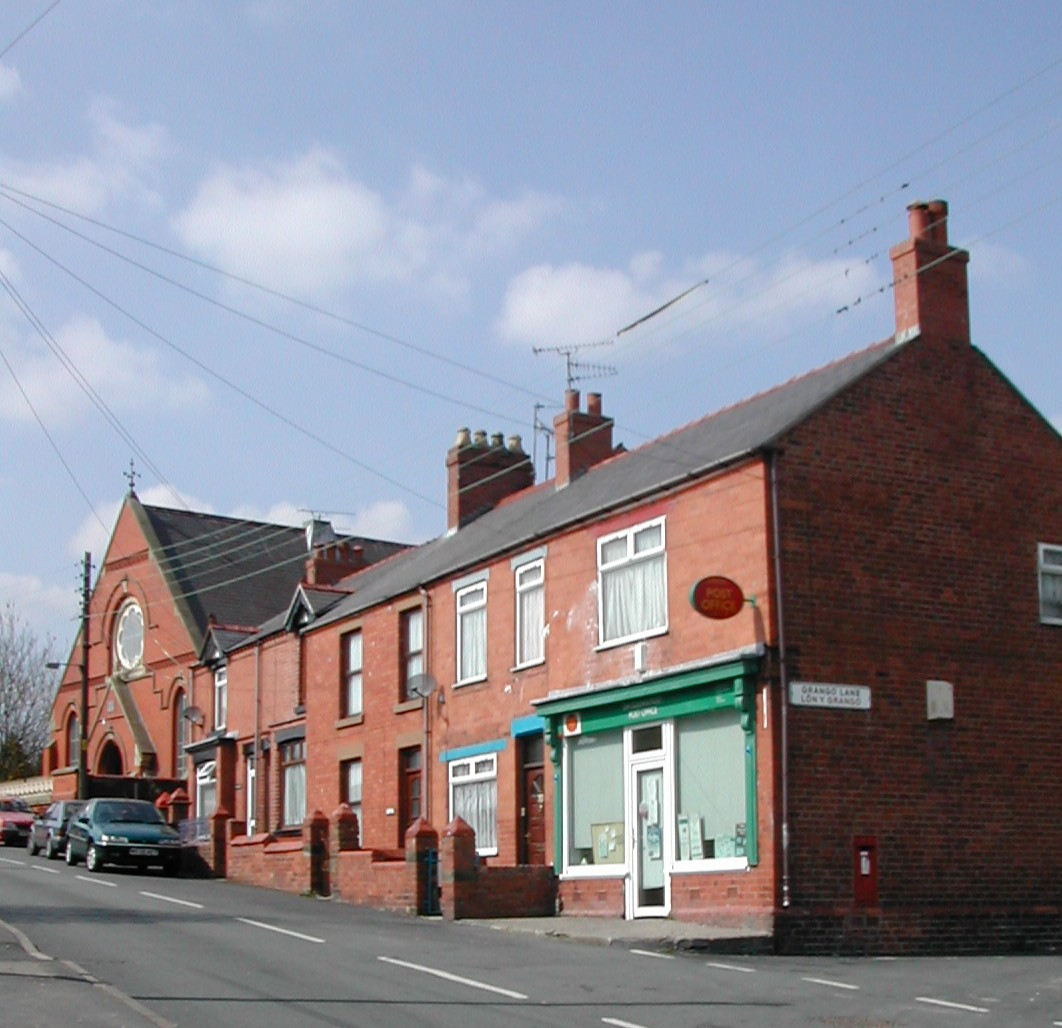
- Post office and Salem Congregationalist chapel, Bank Street, Ponciau

- Location within Wrexham
- OS grid reference: SJ294467
- Community: Rhosllanerchrugog
- Principal area: Wrexham
- Country: Wales
- Sovereign state: United Kingdom
- Post town: WREXHAM
- Postcode district: LL14
- Dialling code: 01978
- Police: North Wales
- Fire: North Wales
- Ambulance: Welsh
- UK Parliament: Clwyd South
- Senedd Cymru – Welsh Parliament: Clwyd South

Ponciau is a village within the community of Rhosllanerchrugog, Wrexham County Borough, Wales. It is close to the villages of Legacy, Pentre Bychan, and Johnstown and is overlooked by Ruabon Mountain.

The village name is also applied to a larger electoral ward, whose population at the 2011 Census was 4,842.

Location of the Ponciau electoral ward in Wrexham County Borough, Wales

== Etymology ==
The Welsh word ponc, plural ponciau, means "bank" or "hillock", and the village probably takes its name from the large number of spoil tips which formerly covered the area. The village name was spelt using the form "Ponkey" until 1932, when the villagers convened a meeting to petition for its change to Ponciau, feeling the earlier spelling to be ugly in addition to inaccurately representing Welsh language phonetics. While this was based on a belief that "Ponkey" was an anglicised spelling, it probably reflected a local pronunciation of the word in the dialect of Denbighshire, where the word ending -au was pronounced -e or -ey.

== History ==
Ponciau grew up around coal and iron ore mining and iron founding. Iron ore was mined nearby at Llwyneinion. A coal pit was recorded here in 1757, with a lease on land being taken out by the great industrialist John Wilkinson, while the Ponciau ironworks is thought to have been started in 1807 by Thomas Jones of Gardden. A second ironwork was commenced nearby at Aberderfyn in the same period. Houses were built nearby, with little regard for planning, to house the workers. At Brynydd, close to the Royal Oak public house, was the former site of typical very basic, one room, terraced, workers' houses.

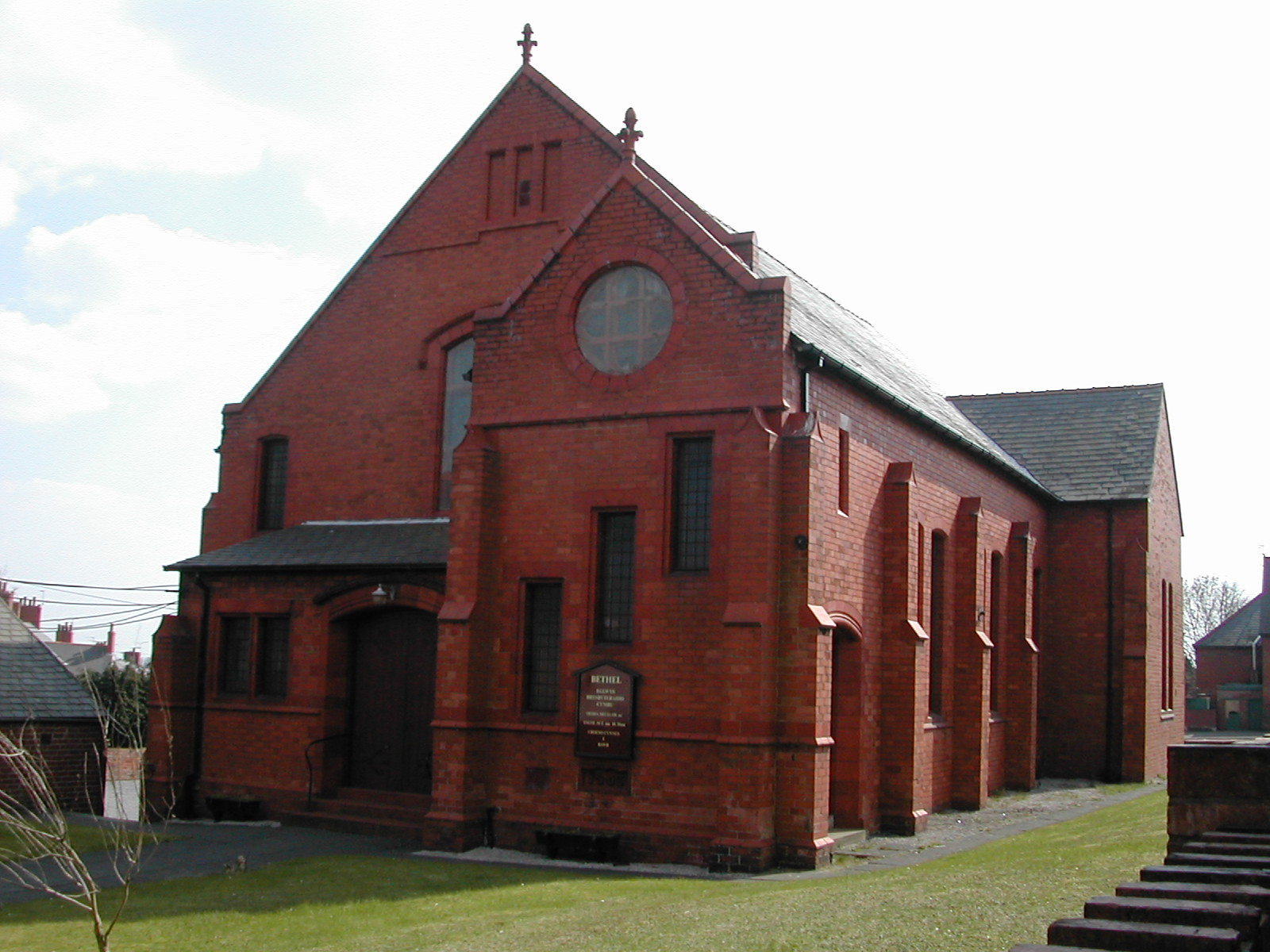
Bethel Chapel, Johnson Street. Ponciau still contains many Nonconformist chapels, some built in the distinctive 'Ruabon Red' brick.

Ponciau and Rhosllanerchrugog previously had more than 150 public houses but the majority of those have closed. The Colliers Arms and Horse & Jockey remain. One of the main streets in Ponciau is Chapel Street, which once contained a large number of nonconformist chapels: the Ponciau area had been one of the main centres of the 1859 and 1904-5 Welsh religious revivals. Several chapels remain in use. Many of the old buildings in the village are made from distinctive 'Ruabon Red' bricks, the product of local clays from the Ruabon Brick and Terracotta Company.

Ponciau ward has one of the largest populations (4,486) in Wrexham County Borough. The ward is described as "The Ponciau North, Ponciau South and Rhos wards of the Community of Rhosllanerchrugog and the Aberoer and Pentrebychan wards of the Community of Esclusham" in the OPSI document Statutory Instrument 1998 No. 3142. 29% of households do not own a car. A section of the ward boundary follows the path of the River Clywedog.

== The Ponciau Banks ==
The Ponciau Banks, earlier known as the Ponkey Banks, was an area of old coal spoil heaps covering around 18 acres adjacent to the village. In the latter part of the 19th century and the early 20th century, the area was used for unofficial 'outcropping' by local miners. These workings were opened particularly during the miners' strike in 1921 and the 1926 lockout, when as many as 50 such pits were operating, to the concern of local union officials. These pits were later capped by the National Coal Board to leave 16 acres (65,000 m^{2}) of land being sold in 1932 for the sum of £500 to be re-developed as a park. Much of the landscaping of the park to the form that can be seen today was organised by the Miner's Institute Committee. The first sod was cut in June 1932, with the work being carried out by 50 local volunteers along with international students.

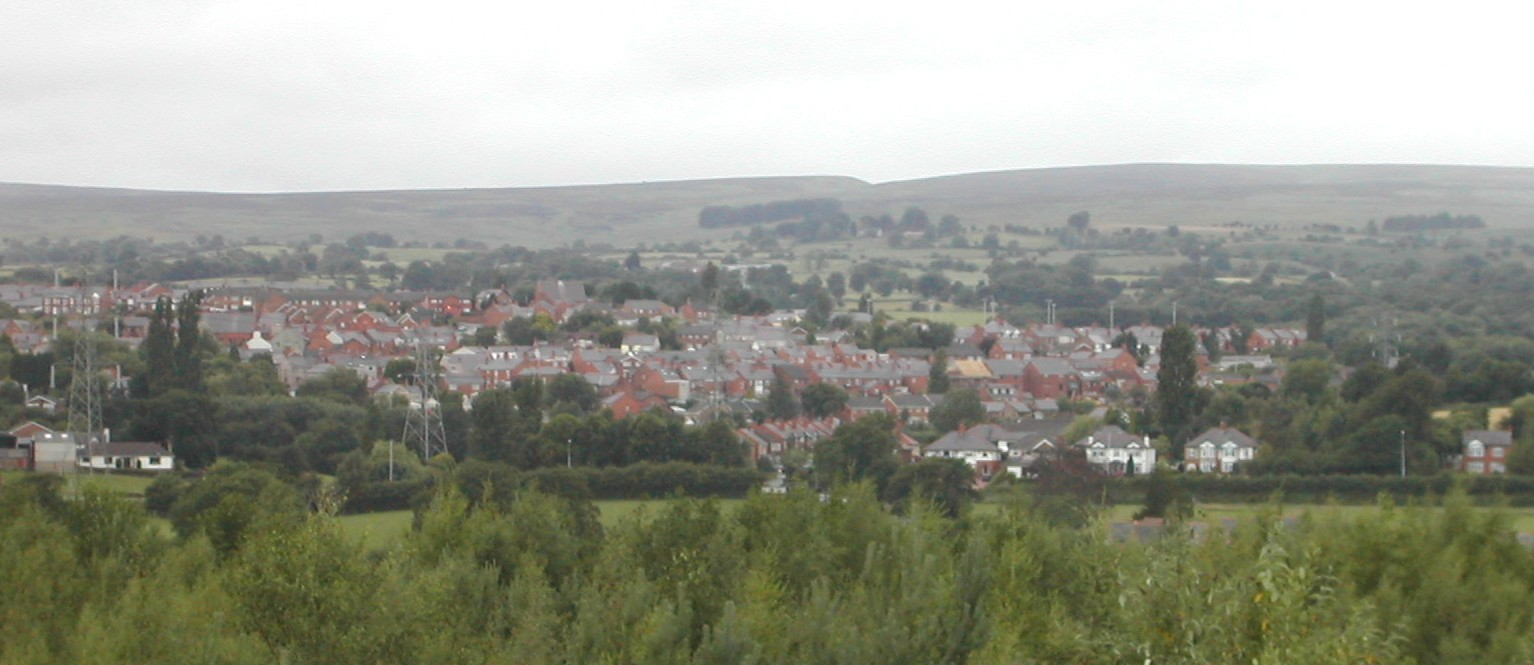
View of Ponciau village from the site of the former Hafod colliery, with Ruabon Mountain behind.

Edward, Prince of Wales paid a visit to the Ponciau Banks in May 1934 to view the progress. In 1935 the laying of the football pitch was completed and the local team, Rhos Aelwyd, have used this pitch for a number of years. The Second World War temporarily halted the reclamation works but in 1950 the works re-commenced. In the interim, the Ponciau Banks were used as the site of the "austerity" National Eisteddfod of 1945.

The park has been the site of many events, including the Gorsedd stone circle from the 1961 Eisteddfod.

The Ponciau Banks Park was refurbished by Wrexham County Borough Council in 2009 using National Lottery funding. The development added a user centre and improved recreational and sports facilities, including tennis courts, bowling greens, skateboarding facilities, a BMX cycle track and a children's play area. In July 2024, the park was awarded the Green Flag Award.

== Transport ==
In 1861 the Great Western Railway constructed an industrial branch line from Garden Lodge Junction, north of Ruabon, to the furnaces at Ponciau and Aberderfyn, which was later extended to Legacy. By 1901 this branch had been connected to the newly extended branch line from Froncysyllte via Acrefair, Plasbennion, Wynn Hall and Rhosllannerchrugog to Legacy. The Ponkey Branch, as it was then known, had a short lived passenger service between 1905 and 1915 with halts at Fennant Road, Aberderfyn and Ponkey (Ponciau) Crossing. Since the closure of passenger services on this lines the village has relied on road transport.

== Language ==
37% of the population of Ponciau speak Welsh (per the 2001 Census).

== Bibliography ==
- Dennis W Gilpin, "Rhosllannerchrugog, Johnstown, Ponciau, Pen-y-cae, a collection of pictures - Volume I" (1991)
- Dennis W Gilpin, "Rhosllannerchrugog, Johnstown, Ponciau, Pen-y-cae, a collection of pictures - Volume II" (1992)

== Notable natives ==
- Thomas William Jones, Baron Maelor
- James Idwal Jones
- Susan Elan Jones, British Labour MP Clwyd South (2010-2019)
- Gwynne Williams, poet
- Stephen Jones (1911–1995), poet and author of children's books
