= Chirk Rural District =

Abolished Welsh rural district

Coordinates: 52.93°N 3.04°W

Chirk
- Area
  - 1901: 18,552 acres (75.1 km²)
  - 1931: 18,552 acres (75.1 km²)
- Population
  - 1901: 4,493
  - 1931: 4,878
- History
  - Created: 1894
  - Abolished: 1935
  - Succeeded by: Ceiriog Rural District
- Status: Rural District
  - HQ: Chirk

Chirk was a rural district in the administrative county of Denbighshire from 1894 to 1935.

The rural district was formed from parts of Oswestry and Corwen Rural Sanitary Districts.

The district contained three civil parishes:

- Chirk
- Glyntraen
- Llansanfraid Glynceiriog

Chirk Rural District was abolished by a County Review Order in 1935, becoming part of the new Ceiriog Rural District.

== Sources ==
Denbighshire Administrative County (Vision of Britain)
