= Ian Lucas =

British politician (born 1960)

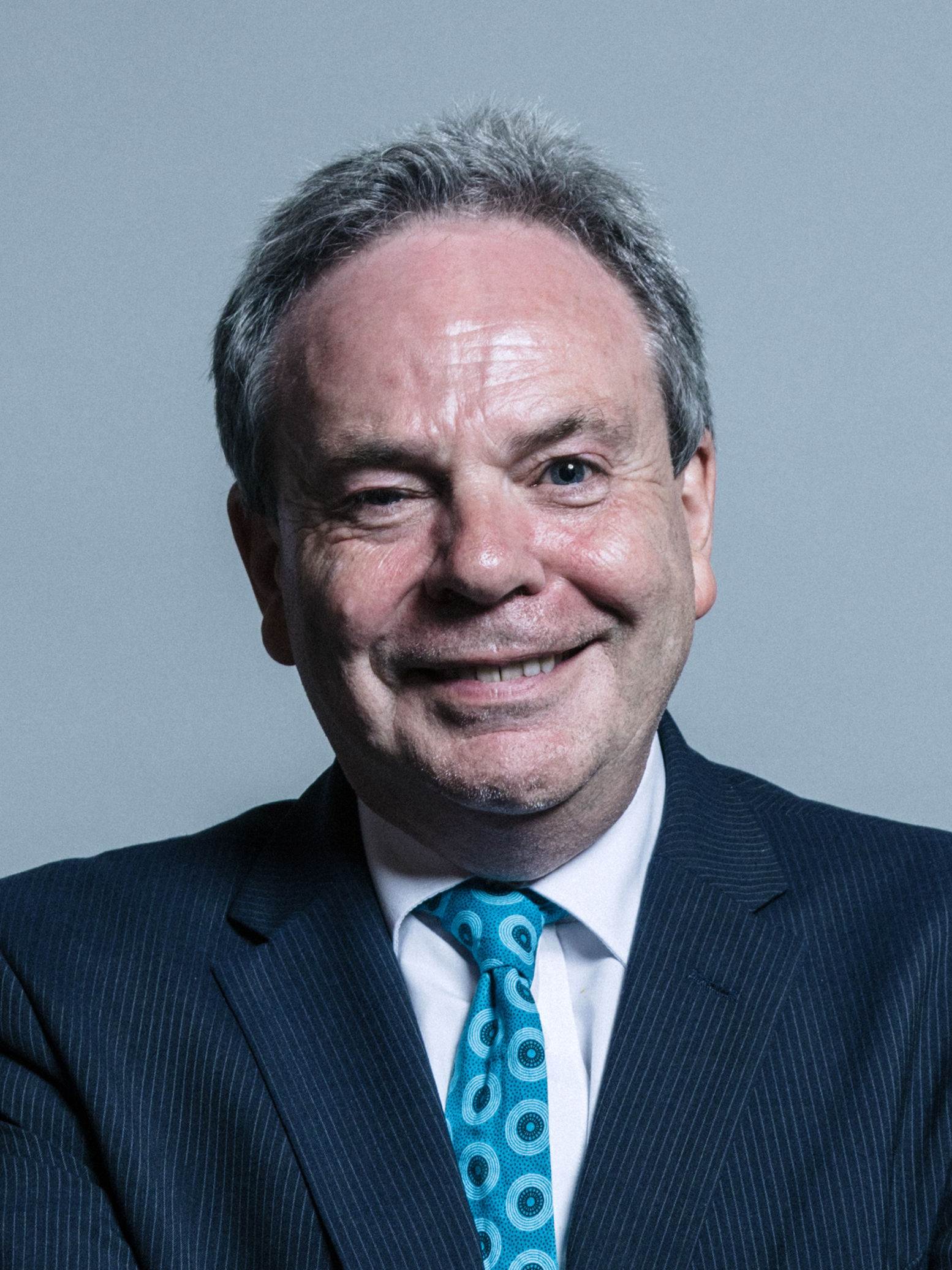

Parliamentary Under Secretary of State for Business and Regulatory Reform
- In office 9 June 2009 – 11 May 2010
- Prime Minister: Gordon Brown
- Preceded by: New position
- Succeeded by: Baroness Wilcox

Member of Parliament for Wrexham
- In office 7 June 2001 – 6 November 2019
- Preceded by: John Marek
- Succeeded by: Sarah Atherton

Personal details
- Born: Ian Colin Lucas; 18 September 1960 (age 66) Gateshead, County Durham, England
- Party: Labour
- Spouse: Norah Lucas
- Education: New College, Oxford

Ian Colin Lucas (born 18 September 1960) is a British Labour Party politician, who was the Member of Parliament (MP) for Wrexham, Wales from 2001 to 2019. He was Parliamentary Under Secretary of State for Business and Regulatory Reform in the Department for Business, Innovation and Skills from 2009 until Labour's defeat at the 2010 General Election.

He did not stand at the 2019 election.

== Early life ==
He was born and brought up in a council house in Gateshead, the second son of Colin and Alice Lucas. His father worked as a process engineer in a local factory, apart from serving in the army from 1942 to 1947 during the Second World War. He attended Greenwell Junior High School on Beacon Lough Road in Gateshead then Newcastle Royal Grammar School, and won a place at New College, Oxford University, to study jurisprudence gaining a BA in 1982. He qualified from the College of Law in 1983 and was admitted as a solicitor in 1985.

He supports Sunderland A.F.C. in football.

== Professional career ==
He became a solicitor practising in London from 1983–6, but moved to Wrexham in 1986, specialising in criminal and personal injury law for Percy Hughes and Roberts in Chester until 1987. He worked for Lees Moore and Price in Birkenhead until 1989. He then worked for Roberts Moore Nicholas Jones until 1992 in Wrexham.

In 1992, he moved the short distance to Oswestry in Shropshire working for Dr Crawford, and formed his own practice, Crawford Lucas in 1997. The move was precipitated because of disagreements with his old firm when he had organised protests against cuts in legal aid. He was a partner in Stevens Lucas from 2000–1. After the death of Diana, Princess of Wales in 1997, Ian Lucas represented Trevor Rees-Jones (Diana's bodyguard, and survivor of the crash) in a legal battle with Mohamed Fayed.

== Political career ==
In 1986 he joined the Labour Party, and became chairman of the Wrexham branch. He was on Gresford Community Council in Wrexham from 1987 to 1991. He contested the traditionally conservative seat of North Shropshire in the 1997 general election, but was narrowly defeated. He has served as a school governor, and on a local hospital board.

He was later selected to stand for the UK Parliament in Wrexham, and won the seat in 2001.

He was Parliamentary Private Secretary (PPS) to Bill Rammell MP, Minister of State for Lifelong Learning, Further and Higher Education. He resigned as PPS on 6 September 2006, due to the refusal by Tony Blair to name a date for stepping down as Prime Minister. Fellow Welsh Labour MPs Wayne David and Mark Tami resigned on the same day.

Lucas was promoted by Gordon Brown in the reshuffle of October 2008, to the role of assistant government whip. He then entered Government as a minister for the first time in the June 2009 reshuffle, becoming Parliamentary Under Secretary of State for Business and Regulatory Reform in the Department for Business, Innovation and Skills, and held that post until the Labour government left office in May 2010. He was the shadow minister for the Middle East and Africa.

He has served as a member of the Environmental Audit Select Committee and the Transport Select Committee.

He has taken an interest in sustainable energy, devolution of powers in Wales, and links with Germany. He is a member of both the Labour Friends of Israel and the Labour Friends of Palestine & the Middle East.

Despite his constituency voting to leave the European Union in the 2016 referendum, Lucas supported a second referendum on the UK's EU membership. He would support remaining in the European Union in the event of such a vote.

He supported Owen Smith in the failed attempt to replace Jeremy Corbyn in the 2016 Labour Party (UK) leadership election.

Lucas did not stand for re-election at the 2019 general election.

== Parliamentary debate about the murder of Nicolas Churton ==
On the 11 April 2019, in a House of Commons adjournment debate he accused North Wales police, the probation service, the community rehabilitation company, the Independent Police Complaints Commission, and the Independent Office for Police Conduct of hiding mistakes about incidents that led to the murder of Nicolas Churton. He further alleged that Mark Polin, the Chief Constable for North Wales Police had misled him over it.

Parliament of the United Kingdom
Preceded by John Marek	Member of Parliament for Wrexham; 2001–2019	Succeeded by Sarah Atherton
