= Tom Ellis (politician) =

Welsh politician (1924–2010)

Robert Thomas Ellis (15 March 1924 – 14 April 2010) was a Welsh politician who was elected several times as a Labour Party Member of Parliament, and later joined the Social Democratic Party (SDP).

== Early life ==
Ellis was born in Pant, Rhosllannerchrugog, Denbighshire and was educated at Ruabon Grammar School. He entered the mining industry, and in 1957 was appointed manager of the nearby Bersham Colliery. He took further studies at the University of Wales and the University of Nottingham. He was a president of Wrexham Fabian Society.

== Parliamentary career ==
Ellis joined the Labour Party in 1943. He first stood for Parliament without success in Flint West in 1966. Elected at the 1970 general election as Labour MP for Wrexham, he was re-elected in the February 1974, October 1974, and May 1979 elections. He also served as an indirectly elected Member of the European Parliament from 1975 to 1979.

Ellis had grown increasingly disaffected with the leftward direction of the Labour Party by the beginning of the 1980s. He was one of the core handful of Jenkinsite Labour MPs who were prepared to leave the Labour Party without the Gang of Three of David Owen, Bill Rodgers, and Shirley Williams. In fact, he had even gone so far as seriously to contemplate joining the Liberals. Ellis' disenchantment with the Labour Party was so great that he probably voted for Michael Foot over Denis Healey in Labour's 1980 leadership election in order to accelerate the disintegration of the Labour Party.

In 1981, Ellis became one of the founding members of the SDP. Ellis was one of three Welsh MPs to join the new party (the others were Jeffrey Thomas and Ednyfed Hudson Davies) and he was elected to serve as the President of Welsh Social Democrats. As a result of boundary changes, Ellis did not contest Wrexham in 1983 election, instead he stood in the new constituency of Clwyd South West which incorporated much of his old constituency. Ellis finished second to the Conservative candidate Robert Harvey by 1,551 votes in a competitive three-way race.

== Later life ==
At the 1987 general election, Ellis stood again in Clwyd South West, finishing a respectable third. After the merger of the SDP and the Liberals, he stood for the then Social and Liberal Democrats at the 1989 Pontypridd by-election, finishing a weak fourth behind the victor Kim Howells.

== Publications ==
- Ellis, Tom (May 2003). Dan Loriau Maelor: Hunangofiant Tom Ellis. Gwasg Gomer. ISBN 1-84323-179-4.
- Ellis, Tom (October 2004). After The Dust Has Settled: The Autobiography of Tom Ellis. Bridge Books. ISBN 1-84494-013-6.
- Ellis, Tom (August 2008). R. S. Thomas a'i Gerddi. Y Lolfa. ISBN 978-1-84771-051-2.

== Notes ==
Parliament of the United Kingdom
Preceded by Idwal Jones	Member of Parliament for Wrexham; 1970–1983	Succeeded by John Marek
Party political offices
Preceded by Winston Roddick as President of the Welsh Liberal Party; Tom Ellis as President of the Welsh Social Democrats	President of the Welsh Liberal Democrats; 1988–1990	Succeeded by Roger Roberts
