= Aled Roberts (Wrexham MP) =

British politician (1889–1949)

Aled Owen Roberts (17 July 1889 – 25 August 1949) was a Welsh Liberal, later Liberal National and finally Conservative politician, soldier and businessman.

== Family and education ==
Roberts was born in Liverpool the eldest son of Robert Roberts, of that city. He was educated at Liverpool College. He married Ione Ruth Irwin from Stone, Staffordshire. They had two sons. Mrs Roberts died in 1940.

== Soldier ==
During the First World War, Roberts served in the army. He achieved the rank of captain in the Royal Welch Fusiliers in 1915 and served abroad from 1916 to 1919. During the Second World War, Roberts served as a lieutenant-colonel in the Home Guard after 1941.

== Business ==
Roberts was a prominent figure in the business life of Liverpool. His main interests were in insurance. He was an insurance broker in his own firm, Aled O Roberts & Co. and an underwriter. He was a director in the firms of Morris & Jones Ltd, Provincial Insurance Co. Ltd, Monument Insurance Co Ltd and the Clarence Building Society.

== Politics ==
In politics, Roberts started life as a Liberal. He unsuccessfully contested Liverpool East Toxteth at a by-election in 1929 and was also the candidate in that seat at the 1929 general election. He did enter Parliament for Wrexham at the 1931 general election as a Liberal in support of the National Government of Ramsay MacDonald and with the agreement of the local Conservatives. He later left the government side to go into opposition with the Liberal group led by Sir Herbert Samuel but his position in Wrexham depended on Tory support and his local party tried to steer him in the direction of the Liberal Nationals. Although he had no Tory opponent at the 1935 general election the Chairman of the local Conservative Association apparently urged his supporters to abstain rather than vote for Roberts, who stood as a Liberal rather than Liberal National and the seat went Labour by a majority of over 5,000 votes. He was elected to Liverpool City Council in 1936 and served until the time of his death. He was also a member of the Merseyside and North Wales Electricity Board, Chairman of the Licensing Committee and a justice of the peace.

== Liberal National and Conservative ==
Although he had failed to join the Liberal Nationals when it might have helped him hold his Wrexham seat before 1935, he did join later and in 1943 tried to secure the nomination to be the Liberal National candidate for the by-election at Eddisbury in 1943. In 1945, while he was still deputy leader of the Liberal group on Liverpool City Council he joined the Conservatives. He was selected to stand as Tory candidate for Liverpool, Kirkdale at the 1945 general election but lost to Labour.

== Welsh heritage ==
Although he was born in Liverpool, Roberts always regarded himself as Welsh, as his army and political connections demonstrated. He managed Fire, Pensions and other insurance for the Presbyterian Church of Wales, was a keen supporter of the Eisteddfod and a member of the Council of the Liverpool Welsh National Society.

== See also ==
- List of Liberal Party (UK) MPs

Parliament of the United Kingdom
| Preceded by Robert Richards | Member of Parliament for Wrexham; 1931 – 1935 | Succeeded by Robert Richards |
