= Idwal Jones (politician) =

Welsh politician

James Idwal Jones (30 June 1900 – 18 October 1982) was a Welsh, Labour Party politician.

He was born in Rhosllannerchrugog, Wrexham, and educated at Ruabon Grammar School and Normal College, Bangor. He became a teacher in 1922 in Holt, but then moved to positions in Glyn Ceiriog and Penycae. In 1938, he was appointed as headmaster at Grango School in his home village of Rhosllannerchrugog.

He first stood as a Labour Parliamentary candidate in 1951 for the Denbigh constituency, but was unsuccessful. He was elected at a by-election in March 1955 following the death of the sitting Labour MP Robert Richards. Jones held the seat at the general election in May 1955, and at subsequent elections until he retired from the House of Commons at the 1970 general election.

He died at Ponciau, Wrexham, aged 82.

He was the brother of Thomas Jones, Baron Maelor, Member of Parliament for Merioneth from 1951 to 1966.

== See also ==
- 1955 Wrexham by-election

Parliament of the United Kingdom
Preceded by Robert Richards	Member of Parliament for Wrexham; 1955–1970	Succeeded by Tom Ellis
