= Christmas Price Williams =

Welsh politician

Chris Williams

Christmas "Chris" Price Williams (25 December 1881 – 18 August 1965) was a Welsh Liberal politician.

== Family and education ==
Williams was born on Christmas Day 1881 and grew up at Brymbo Hall, his father Peter Williams being managing director of the Brymbo Steel Company near Wrexham. He went to Grove Park School in Wrexham and at Mold, Flintshire before attending Victoria University of Manchester where he received a B.Sc. honours degree in Science and an M.Sc. In 1909, he married Marion Davies of Brymbo who was the author of a number of novels and plays.

== Career ==
Williams went into engineering and worked in enterprises in Sheffield, Warrington and also in South Africa. He worked as a fitter and draughtsman but also held important managerial positions and undertook research on the industrial capacity and potential of Canada.

== MP for Wrexham ==
Williams was elected as the Member of Parliament for Wrexham at the 1924 general election. Williams was fighting the sitting Labour MP, Professor Robert Richards who was also a government minister, Under-Secretary of State for India. Williams was fortunate that the local Conservatives decided to withdraw their candidate, E.F.Bushby, at the last minute to ensure a straight fight between Socialist and non-socialist candidates. At the previous election, the Liberal vote had exceeded Bushby's vote by only a few hundred votes.

Whilst in Parliament, Williams seems to have taken a particular interest in imports and exports (notably of coal) both to the Empire and foreign countries asking details questions of the relevant ministers. He also made an official visit to Barcelona in 1926 to see the working of a hydro-electric plant. Williams was a supporter of David Lloyd George and in February 1927 he co-sponsored a Landlord and Tenant Bill with Lloyd George and other Welsh MPs, strengthening the rights of tenants. He supported Lloyd George as chairman of the Parliamentary Liberal Party and generally voted with him when the party was split over whether or not to support the government in the lobbies.

== The 1929 general election ==
At the 1929 general election Bushby was not so generous and Williams faced a three-cornered contest, with Robert Richards again standing for Labour. Despite the Liberal Party's improved performance nationally at this election, Williams was unable to hold his seat which Richards regained for Labour. Bushby had had enough however and announced his intention to stand down from Wrexham politics at the next election.

== Montgomeryshire ==
Disappointed at his inability to hold onto Wrexham, Williams followed Bushby with a similar statement in 1930 but he nearly made it back into the House of Commons for the traditionally Liberal seat of Montgomeryshire. The sitting MP and future Liberal leader Clement Davies had reluctantly decided to stand down after having been appointed a director of Unilever and having given the Board an undertaking not to carry on as an MP. At first Davies' wife had been willing to stand instead but she too withdrew and the local Association adopted Williams to be their candidate at the 1931 general election. As the election approached however Unilever lifted their objection to Davies' continuing in politics and, while Davies told Williams he would support him if he wished to stand, Williams agreed to withdraw in Davies' favour. Later correspondence from Davies indicates that he thought Williams would lose the election because the Conservatives would have opposed him in a three-cornered contest but once Davies was re-selected, the Tory candidate stood down and Davies was returned unopposed.

Williams also served as a Justice of the Peace.

Parliament of the United Kingdom
Preceded by Robert Richards	Member of Parliament for Wrexham; 1924 – 1929	Succeeded by Robert Richards
