= Robert Richards (Welsh politician) =

British politician

Robert Richards (7 May 1884 – 22 December 1954) was a British Labour Party politician, who thrice served as Member of Parliament (MP) for Wrexham in North Wales between 1922 and 1954.

He was born at Tanyffordd, Llangynog, Montgomeryshire, the son of John Richards, mineworker, and started at Llangynog Primary Council School on 6 May 1889. He then attended the County School at Llanfyllin, Montgomeryshire at the same time as Clement Davies, later Member of Parliament for Montgomeryshire for the Liberal Party for many years. From there Richards went on to study at University College of Wales, Aberystwyth and St John's College, Cambridge, where he read the Economics Tripos and received an upper second-class degree in 1908.

From 1909 to 1911, Richards was a lecturer in Political Economy at Glasgow University. He then moved to Bangor University, where he held the chair in Economics until 1922. Richards also wrote a book called Cymru'r Oesau Canol, published during a hiatus from parliament in 1933.

Richards was first elected at the 1922 general election, and was re-elected in 1923. In 1924, he served as Under-Secretary of State for India during the first MacDonald government. At the 1924 general election, he lost the seat to the Liberal Party candidate, Christmas Price Williams. He was re-elected at the 1929 general election, but lost the seat two years later at the 1931 general election to the Liberal Party candidate, Aled Owen Roberts. Richards regained the seat at the 1935 general election and served as Wrexham's MP until he died in office aged seventy in 1954.

At the resulting Wrexham by-election in 1955, Idwal Jones held the seat for Labour.

In 1918, Richards married Mary Myfanwy Owen, the daughter of Thomas Owen. She died in 1950.

Parliament of the United Kingdom
Preceded by Sir Robert Thomas	Member of Parliament for Wrexham; 1922 – 1924	Succeeded by Christmas Price Williams
Preceded by Christmas Price Williams	Member of Parliament for Wrexham; 1929 – 1931	Succeeded by Aled Roberts
Preceded by Aled Roberts	Member of Parliament for Wrexham; 1935 – 1954	Succeeded by Idwal Jones
