= Andrew Ranger (politician) =

British politician

Andrew Ranger MP
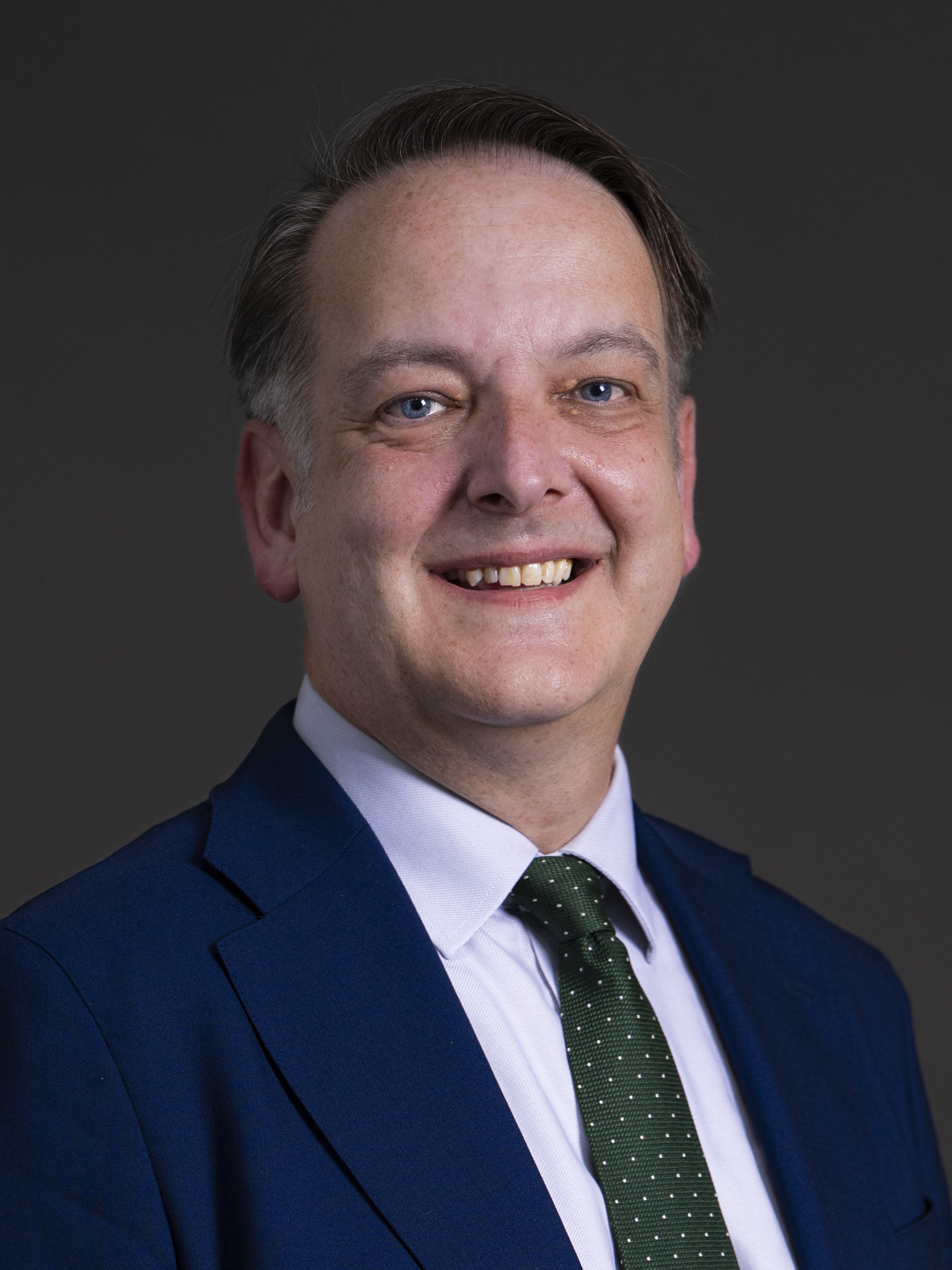
- Official portrait, 2026

Member of Parliament for Wrexham
- Incumbent
- Assumed office 4 July 2024
- Preceded by: Sarah Atherton
- Majority: 5,948 (14.7%)

Personal details
- Born: Andrew Steven Ranger Nantwich, Cheshire, England
- Party: Labour
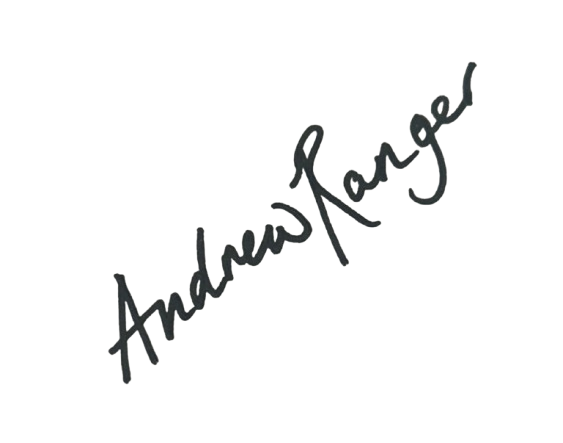
- Signature
- Website: https://andrewforlabourwrexham.org.uk/

Andrew Steven Ranger is a British Labour Party politician who has been Member of Parliament for Wrexham since July 2024.

== Early life and career ==
Born in Nantwich, Cheshire, Ranger read microelectronics and software engineering at Newcastle University, later completing a postgraduate diploma in Hospitality and Tourism Management at Manchester Metropolitan University. He has lived in Wrexham since 1999 and spent the majority of his career working in hospitality, beginning as a kitchen porter and rising to hotel general manager. Prior to his election he worked as a freelance accountant and business consultant, specialising in the development of small to medium-sized enterprises.

== Political career ==
Ranger has been a Labour member since 2011, joining the party to campaign against the coalition government's policy of austerity. He serves on the Offa Community Council and has acted as chair, vice-chair and secretary of the Wrexham Constituency Labour Party.

On 8 December 2022, Ranger was selected as Labour candidate for Wrexham, having secured nominations from the constituency's seven Labour Party branches and Unite the Union. He was elected as an MP in the 2024 general election with a majority of 5,948, defeating the Conservative incumbent Sarah Atherton. In an interview on 18 September 2024, Ranger commented that "being elected as Wrexham’s MP is the biggest honour of my life and I will strive to do my best for all the people of Wrexham".

On 16 October 2024, he sponsored the Licensing Hours Extensions Bill, a proposed amendment to the Licensing Act 2003, allowing the Home Secretary to temporarily change alcohol licensing laws at short notice without the approval of Parliament. The Bill's second reading took place on 17 January 2025 and proceeded to the committee stage.

On 28 October 2024, Ranger was elected as a member of the Welsh Affairs Select Committee.

Parliament of the United Kingdom
Preceded by Sarah Atherton	Member of Parliament for Wrexham; 2024–present	Incumbent
