= Geraint Morgan =

British politician (1920–1995)

William Geraint Oliver Morgan, QC (2 November 1920 – 2 July 1995) was a British Conservative Party politician, lawyer, champion of the Welsh language and a veteran of the Second World War.

== Biography ==
Geraint Morgan was born in the Llandeilo area of Carmarthenshire, the son of dairy farmer Morgan Morgan (1888–1950) and Elizabeth 'Lizzie' Oliver (1893–1980). The family subsequently relocated to Newport Pagnell, Buckinghamshire, where his father continued farming at Woad Farm, Lathbury. Morgan was educated at Bedford School, University College of Wales, Aberystwyth and Trinity Hall, Cambridge. Bi-lingual from an early age in Welsh and English, he learnt French to a high standard at school and added German and Italian by his own efforts. He enlisted in the Suffolk Regiment in 1939 and was commissioned in the Royal Marines. He landed on Gold Beach on D-Day and ended the war a Major. He became a barrister, called to the bar by Gray's Inn in 1947, and a Queen's Counsel. He practised on the Northern circuit.

Geraint Morgan contested Merioneth in 1951 and Huyton in 1955 against Harold Wilson. He was Member of Parliament for Denbigh (initially as a 'Conservative and National Liberal') from 1959 to 1983, when the seat was abolished in boundary changes. He was noted for very rarely making any speeches in the House during his 24 years as a member. His obituary in The Independent (a British newspaper) recorded:

"Although not the most frequent of speakers in the Commons, his commitment to the North Wales constituency was unswerving - and totally fair to those he represented. He answered letters from Welsh-speakers in Welsh - and in his own meticulous handwriting. There were triumphs too small to register on the Westminster scale which were of importance to his constituents. Many householders living near the A55 - a road designated "a highway of opportunity" - thanked him for the compensation they received when the road was upgraded."

Geraint Morgan was never one unquestioningly to troop through the lobby designated by the party whips. Soon after his election, he refused to support his own party over the Profumo affair. In 1971, he voted against British entry to the Common Market, which is now known (in a significantly evolved form), as the European Union. This was contrary to party policy, since British entry to the Common Market was a central aim at that time for the Conservative leadership and notably for the Prime Minister, Edward Heath.

At the 1983 general election he attempted to be selected for the new seat of Clwyd North West, which was largely based on his old Denbigh constituency, with the addition of parts of the Flint constituency, but found himself in a heated selection battle between Sir Anthony Meyer and Miss Beata Brookes, the Member of the European Parliament for North Wales. Conservative Party central office tried to parachute Beata Brookes in as candidate, although she lacked grassroots support in either Denbigh, or Flint. Anthony Meyer successfully sued in law to have the imposition of Brookes as the candidate declared unlawful. A new selection meeting was held, where the choice was between Meyer and Brookes, Geraint Morgan's application to be included being rejected, despite (according to eyewitnesses) his having considerable support from the floor of the public meeting (open to Conservative Party members, who were not permitted a general vote).

After leaving Parliament, Geraint Morgan continued to practise law as a Crown Court Recorder.

Geraint Morgan was married, with four children.

An historian, as well as a linguist, Geraint Morgan liked to point out, when he knew he would be the last MP for Denbigh, that the first MP for Denbigh had occupied the adjacent (literal) seat in Parliament in Westminster to the very last MP in Westminster for Calais.

Parliament of the United Kingdom
Preceded by Garner Evans	Member of Parliament for Denbigh; 1959 – 1983	Constituency abolished
