= Henry Morris-Jones =

British physician and politician

Henry Morris-Jones

Sir John Henry Morris-Jones MC, DL (2 November 1884 – 9 July 1972) was a Welsh doctor, soldier and Liberal Party, later Liberal National politician.

== Early life, education and family ==
Morris-Jones was born in the Caernarfonshire village of Waenfawr, the son of Captain Morris Jones and his wife Ann. He was educated at Menai Bridge Grammar School, Anglesey and St Mungo's College of Medicine in Glasgow. In 1931 he married Leila Paget-Marsland, a widow. They never had children.

== Medical career ==
Morris-Jones qualified as a doctor (LRFPS) in 1906 from Glasgow, gaining a further licence for surgery (LRCP&S) from Edinburgh, and was for twenty years a general practitioner in Colwyn Bay in North Wales. During the First World War, Morris-Jones served in the 2nd Battalion of the Worcestershire Regiment as a medical officer in France, during which time he was awarded the Military Cross. He was later granted the rank of honorary captain in the Royal Army Medical Corps. In 1915 he co-authored an article in the British Medical Journal with Hugh Lett, Surgical Experiences at Wimereux, France about his work at the Number 5, British Red Cross Hospital, also known as Lady Hadfield's Hospital. He later served as chairman of his division of the British Medical Association and of the Colwyn Bay Medical Society.

== Politics ==
Morris-Jones took an active part in the public life of the town of Colwyn Bay and the County of Denbigh. He was elected a member of Colwyn Bay Urban District Council, later becoming its chairman. He was High Sheriff Designate of the county, 1929–30, and also served as a member of the County Council. In 1956 he received the honorary freedom of Colwyn Bay. He was also appointed a Deputy Lieutenant of Denbighshire and was a Justice of the Peace.

At the 1929 general election, Morris-Jones was nominated by the Llangollen Liberal Association to be the candidate for Denbigh and on 4 April he was selected by the local party to stand in succession to the sitting Member of Parliament (MP) Ellis William Davies who was resigning on grounds of ill-health. Morris-Jones had a straight fight against the 32-year-old Conservative, Captain Alan Crosland Graham of Clwyd Hall, Ruthin, the political private secretary to Lord Balfour. The Liberal party improved its position nationally in 1929, going up from 40 to 59 seats and increasing its share of the vote by nearly 6%. However it did not make the breakthrough it had hoped for against the background of its ambitious and innovative policy programme of social, industrial and economic reform under the leadership of a reinvigorated Lloyd George. In this climate, and without a Labour opponent in Denbigh, Morris-Jones was able to increase the Liberal majority from 1,421 to 8,189.

== Parliamentary interests ==
While in Parliament, Morris-Jones took a particular interest in public health and agriculture both nationally and as they affected Denbighshire. He was an honorary Treasurer of the Parliamentary Medical Group from time of election in 1929 and was later appointed as a member of the Committee of Trustees set up under the MPs Pensions Act. In 1938 he was a member of a Parliamentary delegation participating in events to celebrate the 150th anniversary of the founding of Australia. While there he took part in discussions about the development of the Empire, measures to stimulate immigration to Australia and the promoting of Australian trade with the USA. More grimly, he was a member of a Parliamentary Delegation to Buchenwald concentration camp soon after its liberation in April 1945.

== National Liberal ==
In 1931 an economic crisis led to the formation of a National Government led by Labour prime minister Ramsay MacDonald and initially supported by the Conservative and Liberal parties. However the Liberals were increasingly divided over the issue of the National Government, particularly over the issue of Free Trade. The official party led by Sir Herbert Samuel although agreeing to go into the 1931 general election supporting the government became more and more worried about the government's stance on Free Trade and worried about the predominance of the Conservatives in the coalition. However a group of Liberal MPs led by Sir John Simon who were concerned to ensure the National Government had a wide cross-party base formed the Liberal National Party to more openly support MacDonald's administration. Morris-Jones, who had been appalled at the economic record of the second Labour Government, joined this group and thereafter sat in the House of Commons as a Liberal National. At the 1931 general election, Morris-Jones was not opposed in Denbigh either by a Free Trade Liberal or Conservative candidate. Although bitterly opposed to MacDonald's government, Labour did not stand a candidate either, presumably for tactical reasons. So on Friday 16 October Morris-Jones retained his Parliamentary seat as one of 65 MPs returned unopposed.

== Liberal schism ==
After the 1931 general election there was a period of uncertainty in Liberal Associations about the development of separate parties in local areas and Liberals of the official and National persuasion were often regarded by local members as legitimate representatives of Liberalism, despite their formal designations. There was a belief in both camps that the split was nominal and temporary. As late as 1934 the Liberal Magazine was asserting that 'the Liberal Nationals are bound in the course of time to reunite with the normal Liberal Party'. This was not the case everywhere however and in Denbigh Morris-Jones faced criticism and some hostility from Liberals not willing to accept his defection to the Liberal Nationals. This became more pressing after the withdrawal of the official party under Samuel from the government when Liberals argued that it had become increasingly clear that the coalition was a National Government in name only and really a Conservative administration, dominated by the massive Conservative strength in Parliament.

== Government office ==
In 1932, Morris-Jones was appointed an Assistant Government Whip and he held that post until 1935. From 1935 to 1937 he was a Lord Commissioner of the Treasury. He was knighted in the prime minister's list of the New Year's Honours in January 1937. In May 1937 when Neville Chamberlain succeeded Stanley Baldwin as prime minister, Morris-Jones was offered the position of Chief Whip to the Liberal National group after the formation of the new government but preferred 'for personal reasons' to return to the backbenches.

== 1935 General Election ==
As the prospect of another general election approached the Liberal Party policy of not opposing sitting Liberal National MPs came increasingly under threat, although many local parties did not have the resources to put up independent Liberal candidates against incumbent Liberal Nationals. However, in Denbighshire there was a willingness to challenge Morris-Jones, who was seen more and more as a surrogate Tory. At a meeting of the Liberal Association there on 24 October 1935, as the prospect of a general election loomed, it was agreed to adopt John Cledwyn Davies, the Director of Education for Denbighshire and the Lloyd George coalition Liberal MP for Denbigh from 1922 to 1923. Morris-Jones refused to stand down and the two members of the liberal family fought each other in the general election in November. The Conservatives supported Morris-Jones and the intervention of a Labour candidate helped take votes away from Davies. Across the country the Liberal National vote remained steady and Morris-Jones held the seat with a majority of over 5,000.

== Independent MP ==
For brief period during the Second World War, commencing in February 1942, Morris-Jones decided to leave the Liberal Nationals. One of his reasons for resigning from the Liberal Nationals may have been a desire to have the freedom to criticise the government over its prosecution of the war, including the need to place war production under the direction of a single minister which Morris-Jones had urged in 1941. In July 1942 he was signatory to a motion which while praising the armed forces indicated a lack of confidence in the government's conduct of the war. It was later recorded that he had rejoined the official Liberals along with two other MPs, Leslie Hore-Belisha and Edgar Granville. However at the time Morris-Jones described himself as having become an Independent although his closeness to the official party was evident in his voting record and associations. Perhaps he was already thinking about post-war political alignments and wished to keep his options open. He must have been aware of the feeling that, as in the earlier split in the party between 1916 and 1923, Liberals of whatever stripe had a common Liberalism to bind them. In the end the political and electoral realities overcame the sense of Liberal family and Morris-Jones rejoined the Liberal Nationals in March 1943, presumably sensing or calculating it would be the safest way to enable him to continue as an MP.

== Welsh political and public life ==
In 1937 Morris-Jones was Honorary Treasurer and Honorary Secretary of the Reception Committee co-ordinating the Royal Visit to North Wales. As part of the coronation celebrations the King and Queen were to visit North Wales in July 1937. They were to open an extension to the National Library of Wales at Aberystwyth and make a ceremonial visit to Caernarfon Castle. At this time Lloyd George was Constable of the Caernarfon Castle and Morris-Jones was involved in discussion and debate with him and others about the arrangements for the visit and some bad-tempered exchanges took place over the choice of music for the royal programme which Lloyd George felt was not up to the dignity of the occasion.

In 1941–2, Morris-Jones served as Chairman of the Welsh Parliamentary Party. Liberal MPs from Wales had always regarded themselves as separate Parliamentary entity, certainly from as early as 1886. They saw their role as promoting distinctly Welsh causes and being the party of Welsh nationalism. This role diminished with the decline of Liberalism in Wales during the 20th century and establishment of Plaid Cymru in 1925 but there remained a sentiment at Westminster that Welsh parliamentarians should meet together in the interests of their country and the Welsh Parliamentary Party which Morris-Jones chaired was therefore an informal group of Welsh MPs from all parties which met occasionally from the mid-1930s to discuss issues affecting Wales and its relationship with Whitehall and Westminster.

In 1949 Morris-Jones put forward a Private Member's Bill to create the post of Secretary of State for Wales and Monmouthshire supported by a Parliamentary Under Secretary and a Department of State to be known as the Welsh Office for which he got a measure of cross-party support although it did not pass into law. Wales had to wait until 1951 for a dedicated minister, 1964 for its own Secretary of State and 1965 before the establishment of the Welsh Office. The National Assembly for Wales and the Welsh Assembly Government followed in 1999.

Morris-Jones was also a member of the Gorsedd, an association of poets, writers, musicians, artists and individuals who have made a significant and distinguished contribution to Welsh language, literature, and culture, under the Bardic name Rhoslanydd. He also served as a member of the Governing Body of the Representative Body of the Church in Wales between 1950 and 1962.

== Liberal National after 1945 ==
At the 1945 general election Morris-Jones faced official Liberal and Labour opposition in Denbigh but was supported as the government candidate by the Conservatives. In a straight fight against either Liberal or Labour he might well have lost, given the huge anti-government swings recorded at that election. However, with the opposition split, he held on with a majority of 4,922. Although he stood down as an MP at the 1950 general election, Morris-Jones thereafter remained loyal to the Liberal Nationals, or National Liberal Party as it became known after 1948. He served as Vice Chairman of the Executive of the National Liberal Party in 1952 and the following year (1953–54) he went on to be chairman. The National Liberals again held Denbigh against split opposition in 1950, albeit with a reduced majority. It remained a National Liberal seat until 1959 when a Conservative candidate was put up, successfully retaining it. It then stayed Conservative until the constituency was abolished in 1983.

== Standing down from Parliament ==
Although he was 66 years old as the election approached, Morris-Jones' decision to step down from Parliament at the 1950 general election may have been influenced by more than just advancing years. He was genuinely pessimistic about the future of the Liberal Party in Wales and the country at large. In a speech in Denbigh he said he doubted there would be more than 20 Independent Liberals in the next House of Commons. This is a slightly surprising number given that only 12 Liberal MPs had been elected in 1945, a drop of nine on the previous election and since then the party had been experiencing defections – Gwilym Lloyd-George was almost completely associated with the Conservatives by 1950 and Tom Horabin had taken the Labour whip. In fact the party continued to decline at the 1950 general election, making a net loss of three seats leaving then with only nine. Perhaps Morris-Jones also foresaw the final absorption of the National Liberals into the Conservative Party. The formal merger of the two parties had already taken place in 1948 and from then on, it was only a matter of time before any remaining genuinely Liberal element was subsumed by the overwhelming numbers and philosophy of the Conservatives, something which given his Liberal past and strong convictions, Morris-Jones may well have regretted. Although, as noted above, once outside Parliament he stuck with the National Liberals, perhaps in the hope of a peerage.

== Morris-Jones and the National Health Service ==
As a doctor, Morris-Jones took a keen interest in the legislation to set up the National Health Service (NHS). By and large he was not in favour, usually taking the side of the professional organisations in opposing measures to force doctors into the NHS. By 1948 he was much more closely aligned with the Conservatives and their thinking. That Morris-Jones was a man of traditional views in relation to medical matters can be deduced from his association with the campaign to prevent the sale of contraceptives from slot machines, as a 'temptation to youth'.

An early indication of Morris-Jones's misgivings over a national health scheme came in 1942 in the debate over the Beveridge Report. In a letter to The Times newspaper he predicted that the setting up of a full-time National Medical Service for the whole population would cut across the traditional relationship between the doctor and patient and would need a great popular mandate. The tone of Morris-Jones's letter made it clear he did not approve of such a scheme and doubted whether it would ever work. Writing again to the Times on 15 March 1948, Morris-Jones identified with the concerns of many doctors about the powers to be conferred on the Minister of Health and with the doctors' strong desire to retain their professional freedoms and their livelihoods as well as their fears that the new arrangements would bring about a deterioration in standards of medical and clinical service and professionalism. He ended by writing, "The mines can be nationalised; the art and science of medicine cannot be". However, like the doctors, Morris-Jones eventually bowed to the inevitable. Even though there were many doctors who disliked the Act, Morris-Jones felt they had achieved a significant amount though negotiation and should therefore accept the government's offer to join the NHS in July 1948. A further justification he made was that this should be done on behalf of patients who would otherwise suffer from a continuing fight between government and medical professionals.

A year after the introduction of the NHS, Morris-Jones was again writing to the Times to highlight what he saw as the decline in status of the General Practitioner, which he described as' the first line of defence of our health service'. He believed that there was evidence to show that after a year of the NHS there had been a deterioration in the art of medicine as practiced by GPs, an expansion of their workload, an increase in bureaucracy, difficulties in seeing cases through and getting patients into hospitals.

== Publications ==
- Surgical Experiences at Wimereux, France (jointly with Hugh Lett): British Medical Journal, 1915
- Doctor in the Whip’s Room: published by Robert Hale, London, 1955

== Papers ==
Morris-Jones' papers are deposited in the Flintshire Record Office, which is located at The Old Rectory, Hawarden. The collection consists of papers between 1896 and 1965, including diaries, 1911–1918, 1925–1944; pocket diaries, 1912–1962; personal notebooks, 1950–1962; letters, 1923–1963, mainly from fellow MPs; parliamentary papers, 1941–1949 and 1963; miscellaneous papers, 1906–1965; papers relating to a parliamentary delegation to Buchenwald concentration camp, 1945; notes on his ancestors, 1896–1945; press cuttings and photographs relating to his career, 1927–1960; and copies, typescripts and material relating to his publications, including Doctor in the Whips' Room, 1915–1960.

== See also ==
- List of Liberal Party (UK) MPs
- List of National Liberal Party (UK) MPs

== Other sources ==
- For information about St Mungo's College of Medicine, Glasgow, see http://www.gashe.ac.uk:443/isaar/C1047.htm
- For information about the Worcestershire Regiment, see http://www.1914-1918.net/worcester.htm
- For information about Lady Frances Hadfield CBE and her hospital at Wimereux, 1914–18, see http://www.rsc.org/delivery/_ArticleLinking/DisplayArticleForFree.cfm?doi=JR9410000053&JournalCode=JR
- David Dutton, A Stepping-Stone for Wavering Radicals': Conservatives, National Liberals and Denbighshire Politics 1947–64 Contemporary British History, Volume 2, Issue 1, March 2008
- David Dutton, Liberals in Schism: A History of the National Liberal Party; Tauris Academic Studies, London & New York, 2008

Parliament of the United Kingdom
Preceded by Ellis Davies	Member of Parliament for Denbigh; 1929 – 1950	Succeeded by Garner Evans
