= Garner Evans =

British politician

Emlyn Hugh Garner Evans (3 September 1910 – 11 October 1963) was a British barrister, Royal Air Force officer, and politician. Early in his career he adhered to the Liberal Party and was once arrested in Nazi Germany for expressing anti-fascist views. He later transferred to the Conservative-allied National Liberals and was elected to Parliament; however his continued allegiance to the Liberal side brought about a premature termination of his Parliamentary career.

== Education ==
Evans was born in Llangollen in Denbighshire, North Wales, where his father, Henry, was a saddler. He attended the local county Grammar School, from where he entered the University College of Wales at Aberystwyth and obtained a Bachelor of Laws degree in 1931. He then went on to Gonville and Caius College, Cambridge in 1932 where he read law. While at Cambridge, Evans was already an active member of the Liberal Party. He became involved in the Cambridge Union Society and was President of the Union in 1934. He was also President of the Cambridge University Liberal Club. He graduated with a Bachelor of Arts degree in 1934, which was converted into a Master of Arts in 1939.

== Chester candidate ==
He spoke at the 1935 Liberal Party Assembly as the delegate of the Cambridge University Liberal Union, seconding a motion moved by Isaac Foot on behalf of the party executive that set out the party's aims. While working as a secretary, he was selected as Liberal Party candidate for City of Chester at the 1935 general election shortly before the poll. Although the seat was reckoned the Liberals' best prospect in Cheshire, Evans came second in a three-cornered fight, 6,699 votes behind the Conservative winner.

== Youth politics ==
In January 1936, Evans was Cambridge's delegate to the Conference of University Liberal Societies and proposed a resolution which deplored the League of Nations procedure by which the United Kingdom and French governments drew up the peace settlement in the Italo-Abyssinian War. He urged that the peace terms be settled by impartial men at Geneva. The ensuing speaker, future Prime Minister Harold Wilson from Oxford, agreed and the motion was passed. Evans became President of the Union of University Liberal Societies, and that June, he was elected to the Liberal Party council.

== Parliamentary career ==
In 1938, Evans was selected by Denbigh Liberals to be their prospective parliamentary candidate at a General Election, expected to take place in either 1939 or 1940. His task was to defeat the sitting Liberal National MP and regain the seat for his party. However, due to the outbreak of war, the elections did not take place.

== Wartime ==
Evans became editor of The New Commonwealth Quarterly, a journal published by the New Commonwealth Society which studied international relations, in 1935. (Winston Churchill was chairman of the institute's British section from 1936.) Evans also helped to found the World Youth Congress in 1936, and was elected President of its political section during its meeting in Geneva in 1936 and re-elected at the meeting in New York City in 1938. During a foreign tour of Germany in 1936, Evans was arrested for "anti-Fascist views". On the outbreak of war he joined the Royal Air Force and served overseas in North Africa and Italy, serving for most of the war as a squadron leader, and ending as a wing commander.

== Move to the National Liberals ==
At the end of the war, Evans was again adopted as Liberal candidate for Denbigh and fought the seat at the 1945 general election. He was defeated by 4,922 votes. He resumed his legal training and was called to the Bar by Gray's Inn in 1946. With a Labour government in power, Evans became attracted by the reforms proposed to the Liberal National organisation which had been allied to the Conservative Party since 1931. When a joint statement of principles of Liberals and Conservatives was published in a pamphlet called "Design for Freedom" in February 1947, Evans was one of the signatories. Although the full merger was not agreed, the Liberal Nationals were reorganised into the National Liberal Party later in 1947, and Evans joined.

== Election for Denbigh ==
The sitting National Liberal Member of Parliament for Denbigh, Sir Henry Morris-Jones, announced his retirement. Evans was selected as his replacement by the local National Liberal Association in April 1948; he then attended several local branches of the Conservative Association (with whom the National Liberals were in alliance) to reassure them, and committed himself to defeating the Labour government. This reassurance worked and he was adopted as candidate in November 1949.

The election saw some confusion as the National Liberals claimed the official mantle of Liberalism; Evans, who faced a Liberal opponent, demanded that the electors were informed whether their Liberal candidate would back Conservatives or Labour in the event that the Liberals held the balance of power. Garner Evans himself broke the spirit of the 'Woolton-Teviot Agreement' between Conservatives and National Liberals by referring to himself as a 'National Liberal' only on his election literature. He won the seat with a narrow majority of 1,209 over the Liberal candidate, and only 38.9% of the total vote.

Evans made his maiden speech in June 1950 in support of the United Kingdom joining the Schuman Plan, but his main point was to call on the Labour Party to get back to idealism and internationalism and reject the 'economic nationalism' outlined by Chancellor of the Exchequer Stafford Cripps. He was re-elected in the 1951 general election with a much improved majority of 7,915 over Labour; the previous Liberal candidate had taken a job in Switzerland and his replacement could not get established.

== Campaigns ==
In Parliament Evans was made Secretary to the Parliamentary Committee on Atomic Energy. He pressed for more help for his constituents: in December 1953 he stated that the best aid the Government could give to agriculture in Wales was a marketing policy, and in November 1954 he insisted that the Home Secretary could not manage Welsh affairs without additional ministerial help and called for new Minister of State in the House of Lords. Early in 1955, Evans was one of six Members of Parliament to visit the British Army of the Rhine and bring back a report calling for national servicemen to be paid the same as the regular Army, among other changes.

== Welsh affairs ==
There was some local criticism of Garner Evans as the Parliament wore on. In December 1954 an extraordinary meeting of the Conservative Central Council in the constituency was called to hear a report on a complaint against him: it was alleged that he had addressed a meeting in Llanrwst when "not in a fit condition to do so". The meeting passed a vote recording its displeasure, but also adopted him as its candidate for the next election.

The return of the popular Liberal candidate from 1950 ensured that Evans's majority was cut in the 1955 general election to 4,641. Evans spoke in January 1956 in favour of encouraging the Welsh language through education and broadcasting, arguing that Welsh nationalism was caused by fear of the loss of language and culture. When the Government appointed a minister with responsibility for Welsh Affairs, Evans echoed Labour complaints about the lowly status of the new minister and described his powers as "nebulous".

== Political stances ==
Evans was generally loyal in his voting behaviour in the House of Commons although he did twice rebel against the whip on minor technical issues. He supported the ending of capital punishment on a free vote in 1956. When S. O. Davies introduced the Government of Wales Bill in 1955 which would have created a devolved Welsh Parliament, Evans questioned whether the Welsh people supported it, and went on to vote against the Bill making any progress.

== Relations with the Conservatives ==
Continuing concerns at Evans's political and personal performance both in Parliament and in the constituency prompted a meeting of the Conservative Central Council to be called in May 1958. Despite Garner Evans pleading to the meeting that "I have spent pretty well all my life trying to bring Liberals and Conservatives together", the delegates passed a motion of no confidence in their Member of Parliament by 44 to 15. The association President then said that he would then move to discuss with the National Liberals how to select a candidate acceptable to both parties. In November 1958 Conservative Central Office reported that Evans had told them he would not be a candidate for re-election. The Conservative Association subsequently selected Geraint Morgan.

This situation put the National Liberals in a quandary as they had not withdrawn support from Garner Evans. In July 1958 he issued a statement to his electors pledging continued support for the Government and urging the Conservatives not to take any "hasty action" which might place his and other National Liberal seats in jeopardy. The same month, a meeting of the National Liberals pledged support for him; however the Conservatives undertook prolonged negotiations.

It was only on the eve of the 1959 general election that a deal worked out by Conservative Chairman Lt-Col. J. C. Wynne-Edwards was agreed under which Morgan agreed to run as a 'Conservative and National Liberal' candidate. Morgan spoke to the National Liberals and persuaded them to pledge official support to him. During the election campaign, the Liberal candidate attacked the Conservatives for withdrawing support from Evans.

== Sources ==
- David Dutton (March 2008). "'A Stepping-Stone for Wavering Radicals': Conservatives, National Liberals and Denbighshire Politics 1947-64". Contemporary British History. 22 (1): 111–125. doi:10.1080/13619460601065875. S2CID 144840476.

Parliament of the United Kingdom
| Preceded by Sir Henry Morris-Jones | Member of Parliament for Denbigh; 1950 – 1959 | Succeeded by Geraint Morgan |
