= United Kingdom general election results in North Wales =

North Wales region used by the Senedd (in Wales).

These are the election results from United Kingdom general elections based on the electoral regional boundaries used by the Senedd (Welsh Parliament), for the Senedd electoral region of North Wales. Since the 1997 general election, this grouping of constituencies into this unofficial region have elected nine Members of Parliament to the House of Commons of the United Kingdom.

== Regional profile ==
Map of current boundaries

The boundaries are based on the Senedd electoral region North Wales. Regions are not used in UK general elections.

== Representation over time ==
=== By election ===
Election		Labour		Conservative		Plaid Cymru		Liberal Democrat		Brexit Party		Green
Election	Seats	Votes	Seats	Votes	Seats	Votes	Seats	Votes	Seats	Votes	Seats	Votes
1997	7		0		2		0					
2001	8		0		1		0					
2005	7		1		1		0					
2010	6		2		1		0					
2015	5		3		1		0					
2017	6		2		1		0					
2019	1	125,309	7	135,982	1	37,247	0	13,366	0	12,159	0	445

=== By constituency ===
Year/Seat	Aberconwy/ Conwy	Alyn and Deeside	Arfon/Caernarfon	Clwyd South	Clwyd West	Delyn	Vale of Clwyd	Wrexham	Ynys Môn
1997	Betty Williams (Labour)	Mark Tami (Labour)	Dafydd Wigley (Plaid Cymru)	Martyn Jones (Labour)	Gareth Thomas (Labour)	David Hanson (Labour)	Chris Ruane (Labour)	John Marek (Labour)	Ieuan Wyn Jones (Plaid Cymru)
2001	Betty Williams (Labour)	Mark Tami (Labour)	Hywel Williams (Plaid Cymru)	Martyn Jones (Labour)	Gareth Thomas (Labour)	David Hanson (Labour)	Chris Ruane (Labour)	Ian Lucas (Labour)	Albert Owen (Labour)
2005	Betty Williams (Labour)	Mark Tami (Labour)	Hywel Williams (Plaid Cymru)	Martyn Jones (Labour)	David Jones (Conservative)	David Hanson (Labour)	Chris Ruane (Labour)	Ian Lucas (Labour)	Albert Owen (Labour)
2010	Guto Bebb (Conservative)	Mark Tami (Labour)	Hywel Williams (Plaid Cymru)	Susan Elan Jones (Labour)	David Jones (Conservative)	David Hanson (Labour)	Chris Ruane (Labour)	Ian Lucas (Labour)	Albert Owen (Labour)
2015	Guto Bebb (Conservative)	Mark Tami (Labour)	Hywel Williams (Plaid Cymru)	Susan Elan Jones (Labour)	David Jones (Conservative)	David Hanson (Labour)	James Davies (Conservative)	Ian Lucas (Labour)	Albert Owen (Labour)
2017	Guto Bebb (Conservative)	Mark Tami (Labour)	Hywel Williams (Plaid Cymru)	Susan Elan Jones (Labour)	David Jones (Conservative)	David Hanson (Labour)	Chris Ruane (Labour)	Ian Lucas (Labour)	Albert Owen (Labour)
2019	Robin Millar (Conservative)	Mark Tami (Labour)	Hywel Williams (Plaid Cymru)	Simon Baynes (Conservative)	David Jones (Conservative)	Rob Roberts (Conservative)	James Davies (Conservative)	Sarah Atherton (Conservative)	Virginia Crosbie (Conservative)

- **Bold** indicates the candidate that was elected MP
- † represents that the incumbent did not run again.
- § represents that the incumbent was defeated for nomination.
- ₰ represents that the incumbent was disqualified from their nomination contest.
- ‡ represents that the incumbent contested a different constituency.

== 2019 ==
Constituency	Candidates						Incumbent
Constituency	Labour	Conservative	Plaid Cymru	Liberal Democrat	Brexit Party	Other	Incumbent
Aberconwy	Emily Owen 12,653 (39.7%)	Robin Millar 14,687 (46.1%)	Lisa Goodier 2,704 (8.5%)	Jason Edwards 1,821 (5.7%)			Guto Bebb†
Alyn and Deeside	Mark Tami 18,271 (42.5%)	Sanjoy Sen 18,058 (42.0%)	Susan Hills 1,453 (3.4%)	Donna Lalek 2,548 (5.9%)	Simon Wall 2,678 (6.2%)		Mark Tami
Arfon	Steffie Williams Roberts 10,353 (35.6%)	Gonul Daniels 4,428 (15.2%)	Hywel Williams 11,519 (40.8%)		Gary Gribben 1,159 (4.0%)		Hywel Williams
Clwyd South	Susan Elan Jones 14,983 (41.3%)	Simon Baynes 16,222 (44.7%)	Christopher Allen 2,137 (5.9%)	Calum Davies 1,496 (4.1%)	Jamie Adams 1,468 (4.0%)		Susan Elan Jones
Clwyd West	Joanne Thomas 13,656 (34.0%)	David Jones 20,403 (50.7%)	Elfed Williams 3,907 (9.7%)	David Wilkins 2,237 (5.6%)			David Jones
Delyn	David Hanson 15,891 (41.4%)	Rob Roberts 16,756 (43.7%)	Paul Rowlinson 1,406 (3.7%)	Andrew Parkhurst 2,346 (6.1%)	Nigel Williams 1,971 (5.1%)		David Hanson
Vale of Clwyd	Chris Ruane 15,443 (41.5%)	James Davies 17,270 (46.4%)	Glenn Swingler 1,552 (4.2%)	Gavin Scott 1,471 (4.0%)	Peter Dain 1,477 (4.0%)		James Davies
Wrexham	Mary Wimbury 13,068 (39.0%)	Sarah Atherton 15,199 (45.3%)	Carrie Harper 2,151 (6.4%)	Tim Sly 1,447 (4.3%)	Ian Berkeley-Hurst 1,222 (3.6%)	Duncan Rees (Green) 445 (1.3%)	Ian Lucas†
Ynys Môn	Mary Roberts 10,991 (30.1%)	Virginia Crosbie 12,959 (35.5%)	Aled ap Dafydd 10,418 (28.5%)		Helen Jenner 2,184 (6.0%)		Albert Owen†

== 2017 ==
Constituency	Candidates					Incumbent
Constituency	Labour	Conservative	Plaid Cymru	Liberal Democrat	UKIP	Incumbent
Aberconwy	Emily Owen 13,702 (42.6%)	Guto Bebb 14,337 (44.6%)	Wyn Elis Jones 3,170 (9.9%)	Dafydd Meurig 3,536 (11.7%)		Guto Bebb
Alyn and Deeside	Mark Tami 23,315 (52.1%)	Laura Knightly 18,080 (40.4%)	Jacqui Hurst 1,171 (2.6%)	Pete Williams 1,077 (2.4%)	David Griffiths 1,117 (2.5%)	Mark Tami
Arfon	Mary Clarke 11,427 (40.5%)	Philippa Parry 4,614 (16.4%)	Hywel Williams 11,519 (40.8%)	Calum Davies 648 (2.3%)		Hywel Williams
Clwyd South	Susan Elan Jones 19,002 (50.7%)	Simon Baynes 14,646 (39.1%)	Christopher Allen 2,293 (6.1%)	Bruce Roberts 731 (2.0%)	Jeanette Bassford-Barton 802 (2.1%)	Susan Elan Jones
Clwyd West	Gareth Thomas 16,104 (39.6%)	David Jones 19,541 (48.1%)	Dilwyn Roberts 3,918 (9.6%)	Victor Babu 1,091 (2.7%)		David Jones
Delyn	David Hanson 20,573 (52.2%)	Matt Wright 16,333 (41.1%)	Paul Rowlinson 1,481 (3.8%)	Tom Rippeth 1,031 (2.6%)		David Hanson
Vale of Clwyd	Chris Ruane 19,423 (50.2%)	James Davies 17,044 (44.1%)	David Wyatt 1,551 (4.0%)	Gwyn Williams 666 (1.7%)		James Davies
Wrexham	Ian Lucas 17,153 (48.9%)	Andrew Atkinson 15,321 (43.7%)	Carrie Harper 1,753 (5.0%)	Carole O’Toole 865 (2.5%)		Ian Lucas
Ynys Môn	Albert Owen 15,643 (41.9%)	Tomos Davies 10,384 (27.8%)	Ieuan Wyn Jones 10,237 (27.4%)	Sarah Jackson 479 (1.3%)	James Turner 634 (1.7%)	Albert Owen

== 2015 ==
Constituency	Candidates						Incumbent
Constituency	Labour	Conservative	UKIP	Plaid Cymru	Liberal Democrat	Other	Incumbent
Aberconwy	Mary Wimbury 8,514 (28.2%)	Guto Bebb 12,513 (41.5%)	Andrew Haigh 3,536 (11.5%)	Dafydd Meurig 3,536 (11.7%)	Victor Babu 1,391 (4.6%)	Petra Haig (Green) 727 (2.4%)	Guto Bebb
Alyn and Deeside	Mark Tami 16,540 (40.0%)	Laura Knightly 13,197 (31.9%)	Blair Smillien 7,260 (17.6%)	Jacqueline Hurst 1,608 (3.9%)	Tudor Jones 1,733 (4.2%)	Alasdair Ibbotson (Green) 976 (2.4%)	Mark Tami
Arfon	Alun Pugh 8,122 (30.3%)	Anwen Barry 3,521 (13.1%)	Simon Wall 2,277 (8.5%)	Hywel Williams 11,790 (43.9%)	Mohammed Shultan 718 (2.7%)	Kathrine Jones (SLP) 409 (1.5%)	Hywel Williams
Clwyd South	Susan Elan Jones 13,051 (37.2%)	David Nicholls 10,649 (30.4%)	Mandy Jones 5,480 (15.6%)	Mabon ap Gwynfor 3,620 (10.3%)	Bruce Roberts 1,349 (3.8%)	Duncan Rees (Green) 915 (2.6%)	Susan Elan Jones
Clwyd West	Gareth Thomas 9,733 (25.6%)	David Jones 16,463 (43.3%)	Warwick Nicholson 4,988 (13.1%)	Marc Jones 4,651 (12.2%)	Sarah Lesiter-Burgess 1,387 (3.6%)	Bob English (SLP) 612 (1.6%) Rory Jepson (Above and Beyond) 194 (0.6%)	David Jones
Delyn	David Hanson 15,187 (40.5%)	Mark Isherwood 12,257 (32.7%)	Nigel Williams 6,150 (16.4%)	Paul Rowlinson 1,803 (4.8%)	Tom Rippeth 1,380 (3.7%)	Kay Roney (Green) 680 (1.8%)	David Hanson
Vale of Clwyd	Chris Ruane 13,523 (38.4%)	James Davies 13,760 (39.0%)	Paul Davies-Cooke 4,577 (13.0%)	Mair Rowlands 2,486 (7.1%)	Gwyn Williams 915 (2.6%)		Chris Ruane
Wrexham	Ian Lucas 12,181 (37.2%)	Andrew Atkinson 10,350 (31.6%)	Niall Plevin-Kelly 5,072 (15.5%)	Carrie Harper 2,501 (7.6%)	Rob Walsh 1,735 (5.3%)	David Munnerley (Green) 669 (2.0%) Brian Edwards (Independent) 211 (0.6%)	Ian Lucas
Ynys Môn	Albert Owen 10,871 (31.1%)	Michelle Willis 7,393 (21.2%)	Nathan Gill 5,121 (14.7%)	John Rowlands 10,642 (30.5%)	Mark Rosenthal 751 (2.2%)	Liz Screen (SLP) 148 (0.4%)	Albert Owen

== 2010 ==
Constituency	Candidates					Incumbent
Constituency	Labour	Conservative	Liberal Democrat	Plaid Cymru	Other	Incumbent
Aberconwy	Ronnie Hughes 7,336 (24.5%)	Guto Bebb 10,734 (35.8%)	Mike Priestley 5,786 (19.3%)	Phil Edwards 5,341 (17.8%)	Mike Wieteska (UKIP) 632 (2.1%) Louise Wynne Jones (Christian) 137 (0.5%)	Betty Williams† (Conwy)
Alyn and Deeside	Mark Tami 17,331 (48.8%)	Lynne Hale 8,953 (25.2%)	Paul J. Brighton 6,174 (17.4%)	Richard S. Coombs 1,320 (3.7%)	Billy Crawford (UKIP) 918 (2.6%) Klaus Armstrong-Braun (Forward Wales) 378 (1.1%) Judith Kilshaw (Ind.) 215 (0.6%) Glyn Davies (Communist) 207 (0.6%)	Mark Tami
Arfon	Alun Pugh 7,928 (30.4%)	Robin Millar 4,416 (16.9%)	Sarah Green 3,666 (14.1%)	Hywel Williams 9,383 (36.0%)	Elwyn Williams (UKIP) 685 (2.6%)	Hywel Williams‡ (Caernarfon)
Clwyd South	Susan Elan Jones 13,311 (38.4%)	John Bell 10,477 (30.2%)	Bruce Roberts 5,965 (17.2%)	Janet Ryder 3,009 (8.7%)	Sarah Hynes (BNP) 1,100 (3.2%) Nick Powell (UKIP) 819 (2.4%)	Martyn Jones†
Clwyd West	Donna Hutton 9,414 (24.7%)	David Jones 15,833 (41.5%)	Michele Jones 5,801 (15.2%)	Llyr Gruffydd 5,864 (15.4%)	Warwick Nicholson (UKIP) 864 (2.3%) David Griffiths (Christian) 239 (0.6%) Joe Blakesley (Ind.) 96 (0.3%)	David Jones
Delyn	David Hanson 15,083 (40.8%)	Antoinette Sandbach 12,811 (34.6%)	Bill Brereton 5,747 (15.5%)	Peter Ryder 1,844 (5.0%)	Jennifer Matthys (BNP) 844 (2.3%) Andrew Haigh (UKIP) 655 (1.8%)	David Hanson
Vale of Clwyd	Chris Ruane 15,017 (42.3%)	Matt Wright 12,508 (35.2%)	Paul Penlington 4,472 (12.6%)	Caryl Wyn-Jones 2,068 (5.8%)	Ian Si'Ree (BNP) 827 (2.3%) Tom Turner (UKIP) 515 (1.4%) Mike Butler (Alliance for Green Socialism) 127 (0.4%)	Chris Ruane
Wrexham	Ian Lucas 12,161 (36.9%)	Gareth Hughes 8,375 (25.4%)	Tom Rippeth 8,503 (25.8%)	Arfon Jones 2,029 (6.2%)	Mel Roberts (BNP) 1,134 (3.4%) John Humberstone (UKIP) 774 (2.2%)	Ian Lucas
Ynys Môn	Albert Owen 11,490 (33.4%)	Anthony Ridge-Newman 7,744 (22.5%)	Matt Wood 2,592 (7.5%)	Dylan Rees 9,029 (26.2%)	Peter Rogers (Ind.) 2,225 (6.5%) Elaine Gill (UKIP) 1,201 (3.5%) David Owen (Christian) 163 (0.5%)	Albert Owen

== 2005 ==
Constituency	Candidates					Incumbent
Constituency	Labour	Conservative	Liberal Democrat	Plaid Cymru	Other	Incumbent
Alyn and Deeside	Mark Tami 17,331 (48.8%)	Lynne Hale 8,953 (25.2%)	Paul J. Brighton 6,174 (17.4%)	Richard S. Coombs 1,320 (3.7%)	Billy Crawford (UKIP) 918 (2.6%) Klaus Armstrong-Braun (Forward Wales) 378 (1.1%) Judith Kilshaw (Ind.) 215 (0.6%) Glyn Davies (Communist) 207 (0.6%)	Mark Tami
Caernarfon	Martin Eaglestone 7,538 (26.9%)	Guy Opperman 3,483 (12.4%)	Evan Ab-Owain 3,508 (12.5%)	Hywel Williams 12,747 (45.5%)	Elwyn Williams (UKIP) 723 (2.6%)	Hywel Williams
Conwy	Betty Williams 12,479 (37.1%)	Guto Bebb 9,398 (27.9%)	Gareth Roberts 6,723 (20.0%)	Paul Rowlinson 3,730 (11.1%)	Jim Killock (Green) 512 (1.5%) David Jones (Socialist Labour) 324 (1.0%) Ken Khambatta (UKIP) 298 (0.9%) Tim Evans (Legalise Cannabis) 193 (0.6%)	Betty Williams
Clwyd South	Martyn Jones 14,808 (45.0%)	Tom Biggins 8,460 (25.7%)	Deric Burnham 5,105 (15.5%)	Mark Strong 3,111 (9.4%)	Alwyn Humphreys (Forward Wales) 803 (2.4%) Nick Powell (UKIP) 644 (2.0%)	Martyn Jones
Clwyd West	Gareth Thomas 12,776 (35.9%)	David Jones 12,909 (36.2%)	Frank Taylor 4,723 (13.3%)	Eilian Williams 3,874 (10.9%)	Warwick Nicholson (UKIP) 512 (1.4%) Jimmy James (Ind.) 507 (1.4%) Patrick Keenan (Socialist Labour) 313 (0.9%)	Gareth Thomas
Delyn	David Hanson 15,540 (45.7%)	John Bell 8,896 (26.2%)	John Jones 6,089 (17.9%)	Phil Thomas 2,524 (7.4%)	May Crawford (UKIP) 533 (1.6%) Nigel Williams (Ind.) 422 (1.2%)	David Hanson
Vale of Clwyd	Chris Ruane 14,875 (46.0%)	Felicity Elphick 10,206 (31.6%)	Elizabeth Jewkes 3,820 (11.8%)	Mark Jones 2,309 (7.1%)	Mark Young (Ind.) 442 (1.4%) Edna Khambatta (UKIP) 375 (1.2%) Jeff Ditchfield (Legalise Cannabis) 286 (0.9%)	Chris Ruane
Wrexham	Ian Lucas 13,993 (46.1%)	Thérèse Coffey 6,079 (20.0%)	Tom Rippeth 7,174 (23.6%)	Sion Owen 1,744 (5.7%)	John Walker (BNP) 919 (3.0%) Janet Williams (Forward Wales) 476 (1.6%)	Ian Lucas
Ynys Môn	Albert Owen 12,278 (34.6%)	James Roach 3,915 (11.0%)	Sarah Green 2,418 (6.8%)	Eurig Wyn 11,036 (31.1%)	Peter Rogers (Ind.) 5,216 (14.7%) Elaine Gill (UKIP) 367 (1.0%) Tim Evans (Legalise Cannabis) 232 (0.7%)	Albert Owen

== 2001 ==
Constituency	Candidates					Incumbent
Constituency	Labour	Conservative	Liberal Democrat	Plaid Cymru	Other	Incumbent
Alyn and Deeside	Mark Tami 18,525 (52.3%)	Mark Isherwood 9,303 (26.3%)	Derek Burnham 4,585 (12.9%)	Richard S. Coombs 1,182 (3.3%)	Klaus Armstrong-Braun (Green) 881 (2.5%) William Crawford (UKIP) 481 (1.4%) John Cooksey (Ind.) 253 (0.7%) Glyn Davies (Communist) 211 (0.6%)	Barry Jones†
Caernarfon	Martin Eaglestone 9,383 (32.3%)	Bronwen Naish 4,403 (15.2%)	Evan Ab-Owain 1,823 (6.3%)	Hywel Williams 12,894 (44.4%)	Ifor Lloyd (UKIP) 550 (1.9%)	Dafydd Wigley†
Conwy	Betty Williams 14,366 (41.8%)	David Logan 8,147 (23.7%)	Victoria MacDonald 5,800 (16.9%)	Ann Owen 5,665 (16.5%)	Allan Barham (UKIP) 388 (1.1%)	Betty Williams
Clwyd South	Martyn Jones 17,217 (51.4%)	Tom Biggins 8,319 (24.8%)	David Griffiths 3,426 (10.2%)	Dyfed Edwards 3,982 (11.9%)	Edwina Theunissen (UKIP) 552 (1.6%)	Martyn Jones
Clwyd West	Gareth Thomas 13,426 (38.8%)	Jimmy James 12,311 (35.6%)	Robina L. Feeley 3,934 (11.4%)	Elfed Williams 4,453 (12.8%)	Mathew Guest (UKIP) 476 (1.4%)	Gareth Thomas
Delyn	David Hanson 17,825 (51.5%)	Paul Brierley 9,220 (26.6%)	John Jones 5,329 (15.4%)	Paul Rowlinson 2,262 (6.5%)		David Hanson
Vale of Clwyd	Chris Ruane 16,179 (50.0%)	Brendan Murphy 10,418 (32.2%)	Graham Rees 3,058 (9.5%)	John Williams 2,300 (7.1%)	William Campbell (UKIP) 391 (1.2%)	Chris Ruane
Wrexham	Ian Lucas 15,934 (53.0%)	Felicity Elphick 6,746 (22.5%)	Ronald Davies 5,153 (17.1%)	Malcolm Evans 1,783 (5.9%)	Jane Brookes (UKIP) 432 (1.4%)	John Marek†
Ynys Môn	Albert Owen 11,906 (35.0%)	Albie Fox 7,653 (22.5%)	Nicholas Bennett 2,772 (8.1%)	Eilian Williams 11,106 (32.6%)	Francis Wykes (UKIP) 359 (1.1%) Nona Donald (Ind.) 222 (0.7%)	Ieuan Wyn Jones†

== 1997 ==
North Wales elected 9 Members of Parliament in 1997.

Constituency	Candidates						Incumbent
Constituency	Labour	Conservative	Liberal Democrat	Plaid Cymru	Referendum	Other	Incumbent
Alyn and Deeside	Barry Jones 25,955 (61.9%)	Timothy P. Roberts 9,552 (22.8%)	Eleanor Burnham 4,076 (9.7%)	Siw Hills 738 (1.8%)	Malcolm J. D. Jones 1,627 (3.9%)		Barry Jones
Caernarfon	Eifion Wyn Williams 10,167 (29.5%)	Elwyn Williams 4,230 (12.3%)	Mary Macqueen 1,686 (4.9%)	Dafydd Wigley 17,616 (51.0%)	Clive Collins 811 (2.4%)		Dafydd Wigley
Conwy	Betty Williams 14,561 (35.0%)	David Jones 10,085 (24.3%)	Roger Roberts 12,965 (31.2%)	Rhodri Davies 2,844 (6.8%)	Allan Barham 760 (1.8%)	Richard Bradley (Ind.) 250 (0.6%) David Hughes (NLP) 95 (0.2%)	Wyn Roberts†
Clwyd South	Martyn Jones 22,901 (58.1%)	Boris Johnson 9,091 (23.1%)	Andrew Chadwick 3,684 (9.4%)	Gareth Williams 2,500 (6.3%)	Alex Lewis 1,207 (3.1%)		Martyn Jones‡ (Clwyd South West)
Clwyd West	Gareth Thomas 14,918 (37.1%)	Rod Richards 13,070 (32.5%)	Gwyn Williams 5,151 (12.8%)	Eryl W. Williams 5,421 (12.8%)	Heather Bennett-Collins 1,114 (2.8%)	David K. Neal (Conservatory) 583 (1.3%)	Rod Richards‡ (Clwyd North West)
Delyn	David Hanson 23,300 (57.2%)	Karen Lumley 10,607 (26.0%)	David Lloyd 4,160 (10.2%)	Ashley J. Drake 1,558 (3.8%)	Elizabeth H. Soutter 1,117 (2.7%)		David Hanson
Vale of Clwyd	Chris Ruane 20,617 (52.7%)	David Edwards 11,662 (29.8%)	Daniel Munford 3,425 (8.8%)	Gwyneth Kensler 2,301 (5.9%)	Simon Vickers 834 (2.1%)	Scott Cooke (UKIP) 293 (0.7%)	New constituency
Wrexham	John Marek 20,450 (56.1%)	Stuart Andrew 8,688 (23.9%)	Andrew Thomas 4,833 (13.3%)	Kevin Plant 1,170 (3.2%)	John Cronk 1,195 (3.3%)	Nicholas Low (NLP) 86 (0.2%)	John Marek
Ynys Môn	Owen Edwards 13,275 (33.2%)	Gwilym Owen 8,569 (21.5%)	Deric Burnham 1,537 (3.8%)	Ieuan Wyn Jones 15,756 (39.5%)	Hugh Gray-Morris 793 (2.0%)		Ieuan Wyn Jones
