= Welsh Affairs Select Committee =

UK House of Commons select committee

The Welsh Affairs Select Committee (or simply the 'Welsh Affairs Committee') is a select committee of the House of Commons in the Parliament of the United Kingdom. The remit of the committee is to examine the expenditure, administration and policy of the Wales Office, as well as relations with the Senedd. The members of the committee are usually Welsh MPs.

== Chairs ==
Committee chairs include those listed below.

Name	Start	End	Party	Constituency
Leo Abse	25 January 1980	20 November 1981	Labour	Pontypool
Donald Anderson	20 November 1981	13 May 1983	Labour	Swansea East
Gareth Wardell	9 June 1983	21 March 1997	Labour	Gower
Martyn Jones	14 July 1997	13 July 2005	Labour	Clwyd South
Hywel Francis	13 July 2005	6 May 2010	Labour	Aberavon
David Davies (Note: Office officially vacant from 30 March 2015 to 18 June 2015 and from 3 May 2017 to 7 July 2017.)	10 June 2010	6 November 2019	Conservative	Monmouth
Stephen Crabb	27 January 2020	30 May 2024	Conservative	Preseli Pembrokeshire
Ruth Jones	9 September 2024	present	Labour	Newport West and Islwyn

== Membership ==
Following the 2024 United Kingdom general election, a new chair and members of committees were elected:

Member	Party	Constituency
Ruth Jones MP (Chair)	Labour	Newport West and Islwyn
David Chadwick MP	Liberal Democrats	Brecon, Radnor and Cwm Tawe
Ann Davies MP	Plaid Cymru	Caerfyrddin
Gill German MP	Labour	Clwyd North
Simon Hoare MP	Conservative	North Dorset
Gerald Jones MP	Labour	Merthyr Tydfil and Aberdare
Ben Lake MP	Plaid Cymru	Ceredigion Preseli
Llinos Medi MP	Plaid Cymru	Ynys Môn
Andrew Ranger MP	Labour	Wrexham
Henry Tufnell MP	Labour	Mid and South Pembrokeshire
Steve Witherden MP	Labour	Montgomeryshire and Glyndŵr

=== Changes since 2024 ===
Date	Outgoing Member & Party	Constituency	→	New Member & Party	Constituency	Source
6 January 2025	Chris Evans MP (Labour)	Caerphilly	→	Gill German MP (Labour)	Clwyd North	Hansard
13 January 2025	Aphra Brandreth MP (Conservative)	Chester South and Eddisbury	→	Simon Hoare MP (Conservative)	North Dorset	Hansard
17 November 2025	Claire Hughes MP (Labour)	Bangor Aberconwy	→	Gerald Jones MP (Labour)	Merthyr Tydfil and Aberdare	Hansard

== 2019-2024 Parliament ==
The chair was elected on 27 January 2020, with the members of the committee being announced on 2 March 2020.

Member	Party	Constituency
Stephen Crabb MP (Chair)	Conservative	Preseli Pembrokeshire
Tonia Antoniazzi MP	Labour	Gower
Simon Baynes MP	Conservative	Clwyd South
Virginia Crosbie MP	Conservative	Ynys Mon
Geraint Davies MP	Labour and Co-op (Note: Whip suspended from 1 June 2023 to dissolution.)	Swansea West
Ben Lake MP	Plaid Cymru	Ceredigion
Anna McMorrin MP	Labour	Cardiff North
Robin Millar MP	Conservative	Aberconwy
Rob Roberts MP	Conservative (Note: Whip suspended from 25 May 2021 to dissolution.)	Delyn
Jamie Wallis MP	Conservative	Bridgend
Beth Winter MP	Labour	Cynon Valley

=== Changes 2019-2024 ===
Date	Outgoing member and party	Constituency	→	New member and party	Constituency	Source
15 June 2020	Anna McMorrin MP (Labour)	Cardiff North	→	Ruth Jones MP (Labour)	Newport West	Hansard
27 June 2022	Tonia Antoniazzi MP (Labour)	Gower	→	Wayne David MP (Labour)	Caerphilly	Hansard
22 January 2024	Wayne David MP (Labour)	Caerphilly	→	Tonia Antoniazzi MP (Labour)	Gower	Hansard

== Membership 2017–2019 ==
The election of the chair took place on 12 July 2017, with the members of the committee being announced on 11 September 2017.

Member	Party	Constituency
David Davies MP (Chair)	Conservative	Monmouth
Tonia Antoniazzi MP	Labour	Gower
Guto Bebb MP	Conservative	Aberconwy
Geraint Davies	Labour	Swansea West
Susan Elan Jones MP	Labour	Clwyd South
Ben Lake MP	Plaid Cymru	Ceredigion
Jack Lopresti MP	Conservative	Filton and Bradley Stoke
Anna McMorrin MP	Labour	Cardiff North
Jonathan Edwards MP	Plaid Cymru	Carmarthen East and Dinefwr

=== Changes 2017-2019 ===
Date	Outgoing member and party	Constituency	→	New member and party	Constituency	Source
16 October 2017	New seat		→	Tonia Antoniazzi MP (Labour)	Gower	Hansard
16 October 2017	New seat		→	Simon Hoare MP (Conservative)	North Dorset	Hansard
16 October 2017	New seat		→	Anna McMorrin MP (Labour)	Cardiff North	Hansard
23 October 2017	New seat		→	Stephen Kinnock MP (Labour)	Aberavon	Hansard
23 October 2017	New seat		→	Liz Saville Roberts MP (Plaid Cymru)	Dwyfor Meirionnydd	Hansard
8 January 2018	Stephen Kinnock MP (Labour)	Aberavon	→	Thelma Walker MP (Labour)	Colne Valley	Hansard
5 February 2018	Thelma Walker MP (Labour)	Colne Valley	→	Susan Elan Jones MP (Labour)	Clwyd South	Hansard
22 October 2018	Glyn Davies MP (Conservative)	Montgomeryshire	→	Guto Bebb MP (Conservative)	Aberconwy	Hansard
26 November 2018	Simon Hoare MP (Conservative)	North Dorset	→	Jack Lopresti MP (Conservative)	Filton and Bradley Stoke	Hansard
17 February 2019	Paul Flynn MP (Labour)	Newport West	→	Vacant		Death of member
11 March 2019	Liz Saville Roberts MP (Plaid Cymru)	Dwyfor Meirionnydd	→	Jonathan Edwards MP (Plaid Cymru)	Carmarthen East and Dinefwr	Hansard
21 June 2019	Chris Davies MP (Conservative)	Brecon and Radnorshire	→	Vacant		Recall petition against member

== Membership 2015–2017 ==
The chair was elected on 18 June 2015, with members being announced on 13 July 2015.

Member	Party	Constituency
David Davies MP (Chair)	Conservative	Monmouth
Byron Davies MP	Conservative	Gower
Chris Davies MP	Conservative	Brecon and Radnorshire
Dr James Davies MP	Conservatives	Vale of Clwyd
Carolyn Harris MP	Labour	Swansea East
Gerald Jones MP	Labour	Merthyr Tydfil and Rhymney
Christina Rees MP	Labour	Neath
Antoinette Sandbach MP	Conservative	Eddisbury
Liz Saville-Roberts MP	Plaid Cymru	Dwyfor Meirionnydd
Craig Williams MP	Conservative	Cardiff North
Mark Williams MP	Liberal Democrat	Ceredigion

=== Changes 2015-2017 ===
Date	Outgoing member and party	Constituency	→	New member and party	Constituency	Source
1 February 2016	Christina Rees MP (Labour)	Neath	→	Stephen Kinnock MP (Labour)	Aberavon	Hansard
25 April 2016	Antoinette Sandbach MP (Conservative)	Eddisbury	→	Glyn Davies MP (Conservative)	Aberavon	Hansard
18 July 2016	Carolyn Harris MP (Labour)	Swansea East	→	Chris Elmore MP (Labour)	Ogmore	Hansard
21 November 2016	Gerald Jones MP (Labour)	Merthyr Tydfil and Rhymney	→	Paul Flynn MP (Labour)	Newport West	Hansard

== Membership 2010–2015 ==
At the dissolution of the 2010–2015 Parliament, the committee's membership was:

Member	Party	Constituency
David Davies MP (Chair)	Conservative	Monmouth
Guto Bebb MP	Conservative	Aberconwy
Simon Hart MP	Conservative	Carmarthen West and South Pembrokeshire
Glyn Davies MP	Conservatives	Montgomeryshire
Karen Lumley MP	Conservatives	Redditch
Stephen Doughty MP	Labour	Cardiff South and Penarth
Nia Griffith MP	Labour	Llanelli
Sian James MP	Labour	Swansea East
Jessica Morden MP	Labour	Newport East
Jonathan Edwards MP	Plaid Cymru	Carmarthen East and Dinefwr
Mark Williams MP	Liberal Democrat	Ceredigion

=== 2010–2015 changes ===
Occasionally, the House of Commons orders changes to be made in terms of membership of select committees, as proposed by the Committee of Selection. Such changes are shown below.

Date	Outgoing member and party	Constituency	→	New member and party	Constituency	Source
2 November 2010	Glyn Davies MP (Conservative)	Montgomeryshire	→	Stuart Andrew MP (Conservative)	Pudsey	Hansard
22 November 2010	Nia Griffith MP (Labour)	Llanelli	→	Siân James MP (Labour)	Swansea East	Hansard
27 June 2011	Alun Cairns MP (Conservative)	Vale of Glamorgan	→	Robin Walker MP (Conservative)	Worcester	Hansard
28 November 2011	Owen Smith MP (Labour)	Pontypridd	→	Nia Griffith MP (Labour)	Llanelli	Hansard
5 November 2012	Stuart Andrew MP (Conservative)	Pudsey	→	Glyn Davies MP (Conservative)	Montgomeryshire	Hansard
26 November 2012	Susan Jones MP (Labour)	Clwyd South	→	Stephen Doughty MP (Labour)	Cardiff South and Penarth	Hansard
3 December 2012	Robin Walker MP (Conservative)	Worcester	→	Simon Hart MP (Conservative)	Carmarthen West and South Pembrokeshire	Hansard
6 January 2014	Jonathan Edwards MP (Plaid Cymru)	Carmarthen East and Dinefwr	→	Hywel Williams MP (Plaid Cymru)	Arfon	Hansard
10 March 2014	Hywel Williams MP (Plaid Cymru)	Arfon	→	Jonathan Edwards MP (Plaid Cymru)	Carmarthen East and Dinefwr	Hansard

== Membership 2005–2010 ==
At the start of the 2005–2010 Parliament, the committee's membership was:

Member	Party	Constituency
Dr. Hywel Francis MP (Chair)	Labour	Aberavon
Stephen Crabb MP	Conservative	Preseli Pembrokeshire
David Davies MP	Conservative	Monmouth
Nia Griffith MP	Labour	Llanelli
Sian James MP	Labour	Swansea East
David Jones MP	Conservative	Clwyd West
Martyn Jones MP	Labour	Clwyd South
Madeleine Moon MP	Labour	Bridgend
Betty Williams MP	Labour	Conwy
Mark Williams MP	Liberal Democrat	Ceredigion
Hywel Williams MP	Plaid Cymru	Caernarfon

=== 2005–2010 changes ===
Changes between 2005 and 2010 are not known.

== See also ==
- Parliamentary committees of the United Kingdom
