= Clwyd West =

Clwyd West may refer to:

- Clwyd West (UK Parliament constituency)
- Clwyd West (Senedd constituency)
