= Gareth Thomas (Welsh Labour politician) =

British politician

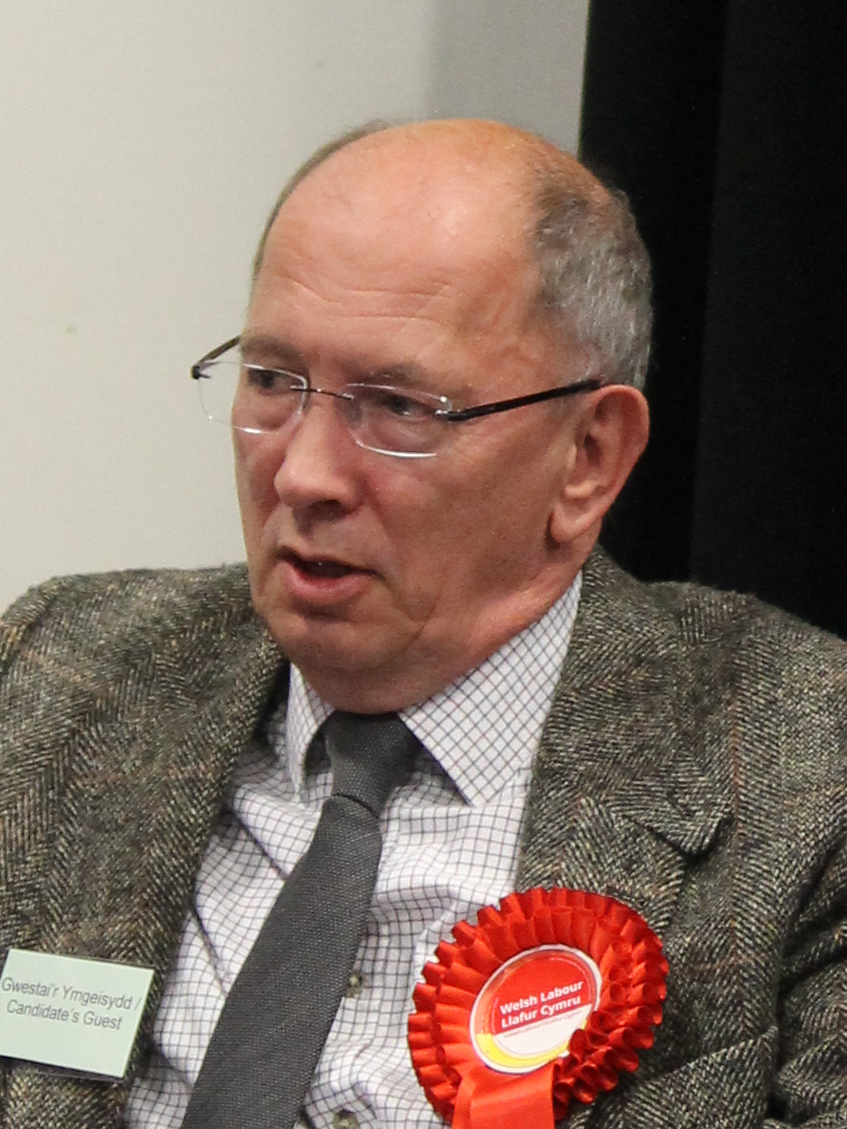
- Thomas in 2016

Member of Parliament for Clwyd West
- In office 1 May 1997 – 11 April 2005
- Preceded by: Constituency created
- Succeeded by: David Jones

Personal details
- Born: 25 September 1954 (age 72) Penygroes, Gwynedd
- Party: Labour
- Education: Aberystwyth University

Gareth Thomas (born 25 September 1954) is a Labour Party politician in the United Kingdom. He was Member of Parliament for Clwyd West from 1997 to 2005.

== Early life ==
Born in Penygroes, Gwynedd, Thomas is the son of a toolmaker. Although brought up on Merseyside, he is a fluent Welsh language speaker. He went to Rock Ferry High School on Ravenswood Avenue in Rock Ferry, Birkenhead.

After graduating in law (LLB) from the University of Wales, Aberystwyth in 1976, he was initially employed in the insurance industry and managed a loss adjusting company in the West Indies. He graduated from the Council of Legal Education (CLE) in 1977. Thomas has been a barrister in a private practice since 1986 specialising in personal injury litigation and is a member of Amicus.

== Parliamentary career ==
A member of Flintshire County Council between 1995 and 1997, Thomas was elected to Parliament at the 1997 general election. Before 1997, Clwyd West had been regarded as a safe Conservative seat. His political interests include Wales, legal reform, social security and the environment. He was a member of the Select Committee on Welsh Affairs, the Select Committee on Social Security and the Joint Human Rights Committee.

He unsuccessfully sought the nomination for Clwyd West seat in the inaugural Assembly elections losing out to Alun Pugh.

Following the 2001 general election he was appointed Parliamentary Private Secretary to the Secretary of State for Wales, Paul Murphy, and in October 2002 moved with Murphy to the Northern Ireland Office in the same capacity. He was a member of Labour's Parliamentary Campaign Team.

At the 2005 general election, Thomas was narrowly defeated by the Conservative Party candidate David Jones.

Thomas has returned to the legal profession, working as a barrister at Atlantic Chambers Liverpool. In 2013 he was chosen as the Labour Party's candidate for Clwyd West at the 2015 general election. However, he was again defeated by Jones, this time by 6,730 votes. He stood again for his old seat at the 2017 election, cutting Jones' majority to 3,437 votes, and achieving a swing of 5% in the process.

== Personal life ==
Outside politics, Thomas's interests include restoring old buildings, traditional rural crafts and Italy. He continues to live in his former constituency, near Ruthin. He is married to Joanne, and between them they have four children, including his youngest son, Howell Thomas. His wife contested his former seat at the 2019 general election.

Parliament of the United Kingdom
New constituency	Member of Parliament for Clwyd West; 1997–2005	Succeeded by David Jones
