= Clwyd South West =

UK Parliament constituency (1983–1997)

- Former county constituency for the House of Commons
- Preserved county: Clwyd
- Major settlements: Denbigh, Llangollen, Rhosllanerchrugog, Ruthin

1983–1997
- Seats: One
- Created from: Denbigh, Wrexham and Merioneth
- Replaced by: Clwyd South, Clwyd West and Vale of Clwyd

Clwyd South West (Welsh: De-orllewin Clwyd) was a county constituency in Clwyd, North Wales. It returned one Member of Parliament (MP) to the House of Commons of the Parliament of the United Kingdom by the first-past-the-post system of election.

The constituency was created for the 1983 general election, and abolished for the 1997 general election. It was a marginal seat throughout its lifetime.

== Boundaries ==
This was a constituency of a varied nature, being made up of former mining villages close to Wrexham (such as Rhosllannerchrugog), the towns of Denbigh, Llangollen, and Ruthin, and a large area of sparsely populated countryside. The seat was abolished and split into three new constituencies on the recommendation of the Boundary Commission for Wales to create an extra seat in Clwyd for the 1997 general election.

== Members of Parliament ==
Election	Member	Party
1983	Robert Harvey	Conservative
1987	Martyn Jones	Labour
1997	constituency abolished: see Clwyd South, Clwyd West and Vale of Clwyd	

== Elections ==
=== Elections in the 1980s ===
General election 1983: Clwyd South West
Party	Candidate	Votes	%	±%
Conservative	Robert Harvey	14,575	33.8	
SDP	Tom Ellis	13,024	30.2	
Labour	Dennis Carter	11,829	27.4	
Plaid Cymru	Antoni Schiavone	3,684	8.6	
Majority		1,551	3.6	
Turnout		43,112	77.3	
Conservative win (new seat)				

General election 1987: Clwyd South West
Party	Candidate	Votes	%	±%
Labour	Martyn Jones	16,701	35.4	+8.0
Conservative	Robert Harvey	15,673	33.2	―0.6
SDP	Tom Ellis	10,778	22.9	―7.3
Plaid Cymru	Eifion Lloyd Jones	3,987	8.5	―0.1
Majority		1,028	2.2	N/A
Turnout		47,139	81.1	+3.8
Labour gain from Conservative		Swing	+6.4	

=== Elections in the 1990s ===
General election 1992: Clwyd South West
Party	Candidate	Votes	%	±%
Labour	Martyn Jones	21,490	43.5	+8.1
Conservative	Gwilym G.V. Owen	16,549	33.5	+0.3
Liberal Democrats	W. Gwyn Williams	6,027	12.2	―10.7
Plaid Cymru	Eifion Lloyd Jones	4,835	9.8	+1.3
Green	Nigel C. Worth	351	0.7	New
Natural Law	Jean B. Leadbetter	155	0.3	New
Majority		4,941	10.0	+7.8
Turnout		49,407	81.5	+0.4
Labour hold		Swing	+3.9	

== See also ==
- List of parliamentary constituencies in Clwyd
