= Gill German =

British politician

Gill German MP
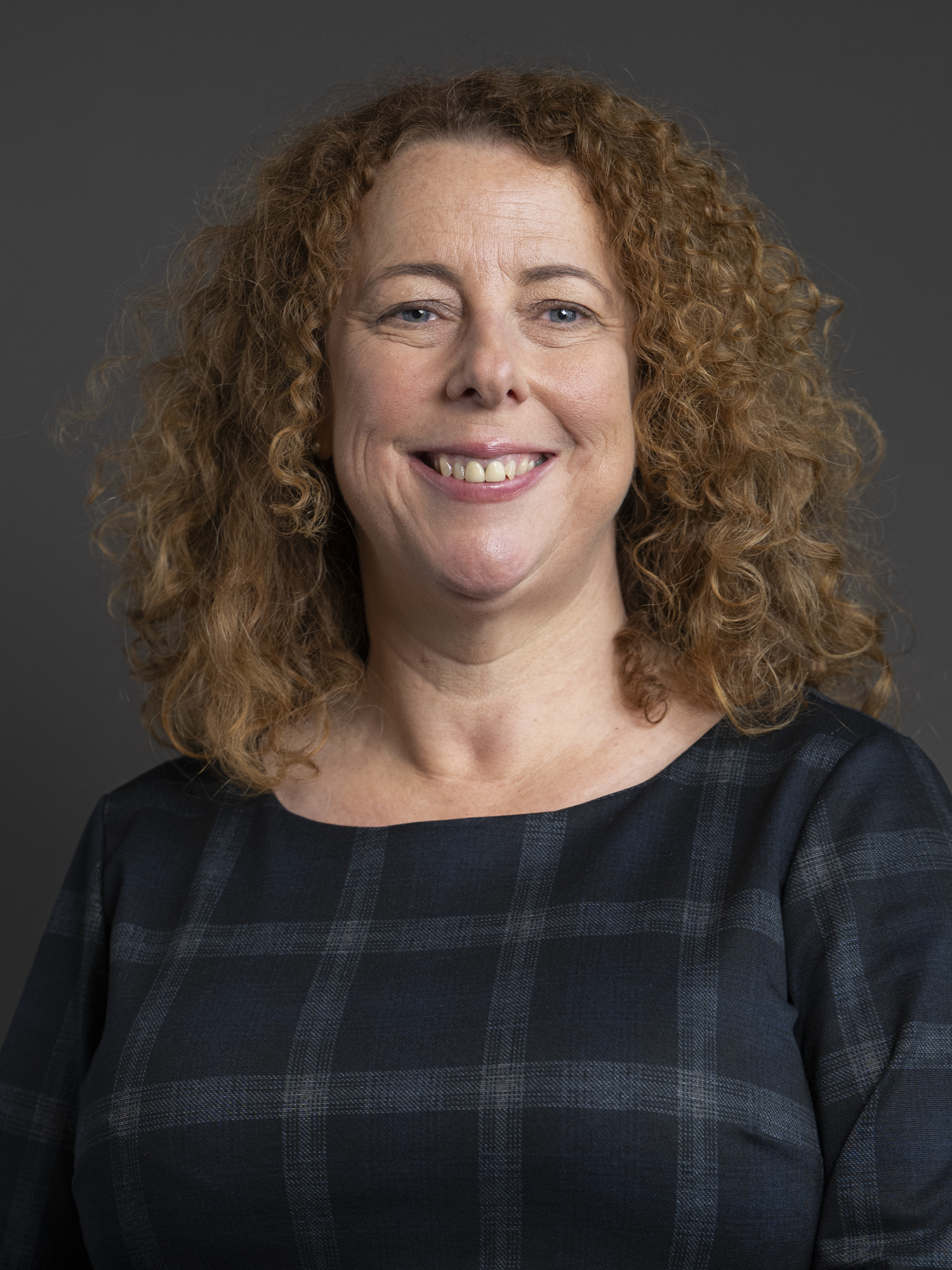
- Official portrait, 2024

Member of Parliament for Clwyd North
- Incumbent
- Assumed office 4 July 2024
- Preceded by: Constituency Created
- Majority: 1,196 (2.8%)

Personal details
- Born: Prestatyn, Wales
- Party: Labour

Gillian Marie German is a British Labour Party politician who has been Member of Parliament for Clwyd North since 2024.

== Early life and career ==
German was born in Prestatyn and worked as a teacher in the local Denbighshire area before entering elected office.

== Political career ==
She was elected as county councillor for Prestatyn North in 2022 and has been deputy leader of Denbighshire County Council, as well as lead member for education, children and families.

She was selected in September 2023 as the Labour parliamentary candidate for the new constituency of Clwyd North. She won the seat in the 2024 general election, beating her Conservative opponent Darren Millar by 1,196 votes.

In October 2024, German was elected as a member of the Welsh Affairs Select Committee.

Parliament of the United Kingdom
New constituency	Member of Parliament for Clwyd North; 2024–present	Incumbent
