= Mair Rowlands =

Welsh politician

Mair Rowlands MS
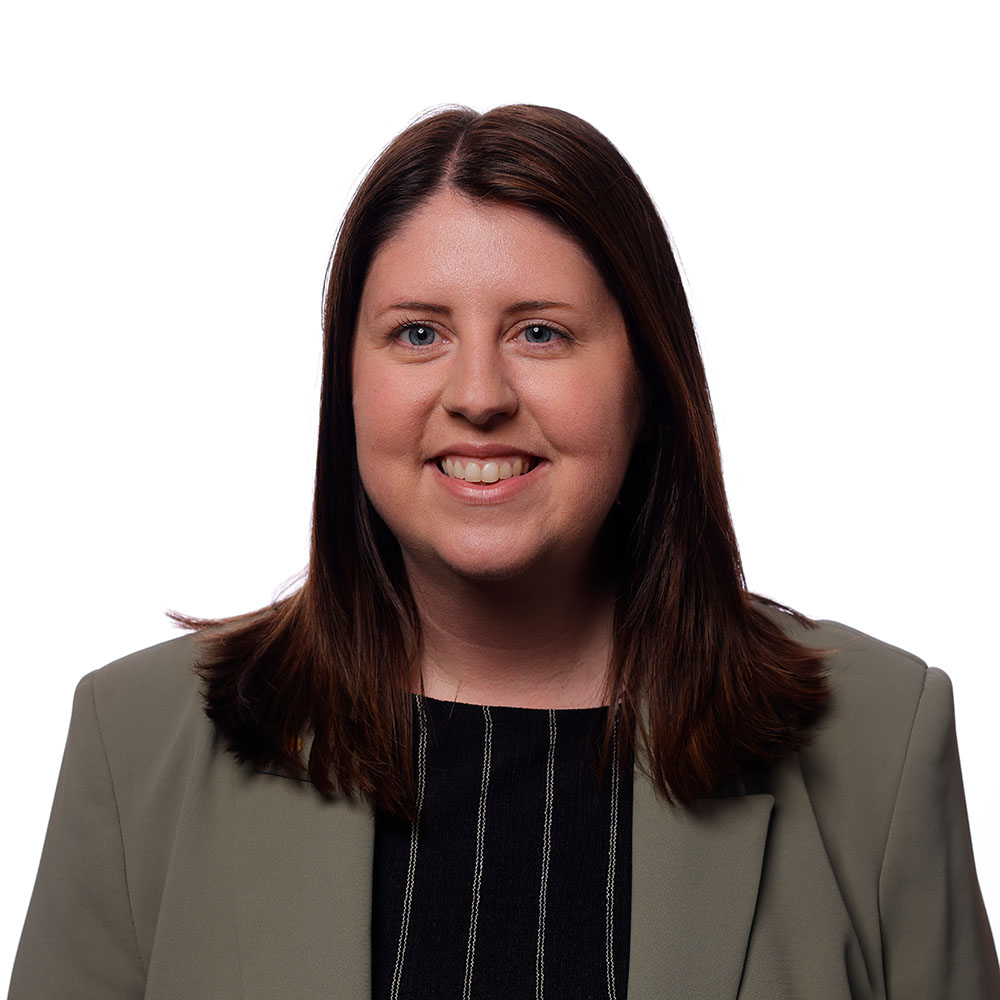

Member of the Senedd for Bangor Conwy Môn
- Incumbent
- Assumed office 8 May 2026
- Preceded by: Constituency established

Gwynedd Councillor for Menai (Bangor) Ward
- In office 3 May 2012 – 5 May 2022
- Preceded by: Robert Marshall
- Succeeded by: Ward Abolished

Personal details
- Born: 2 January 1989 (age 37) Cardiff, Wales
- Party: Plaid Cymru
- Education: Bangor University

Mair Eluned Rowlands (born 2 January 1989) is a Welsh politician in Plaid Cymru, who has served as Member of the Senedd (MS) for Bangor Conwy Môn since May 2026.

== Background ==
Rowlands was born and raised in Cardiff, and lives in Bangor. Her father, John Rowlands, stood as a Plaid Cymru candidate in Cardiff South and Penarth for the 1999 National Assembly election, and in Ynys Môn for the 2015 UK general election.

Rowlands attended Bangor University, and was President of Undeb Myfyrwyr Cymraeg Bangor (the Welsh Students' Union). Her partner is a lecturer at the university. She has a son.

== Political career ==
Rowlands represented Bangor's Menai ward on Gwynedd Council from 2012 to 2022. She was appointed to the cabinet in 2014, and was deputy leader between October 2017 and April 2018. She was director of Bangor University Students' Union.

Rowlands was the Plaid Cymru candidate for the Vale of Clwyd in the 2015 United Kingdom general election, and the party's candidate for the Vale of Clwyd in the 2016 National Assembly for Wales election.

In the 2026 Senedd election she was elected as the second candidate in Bangor Conwy Môn, behind the party's leader Rhun ap Iorwerth.
