= Chris Ruane =

Welsh Labour politician (born 1958)

Chris Ruane OBE
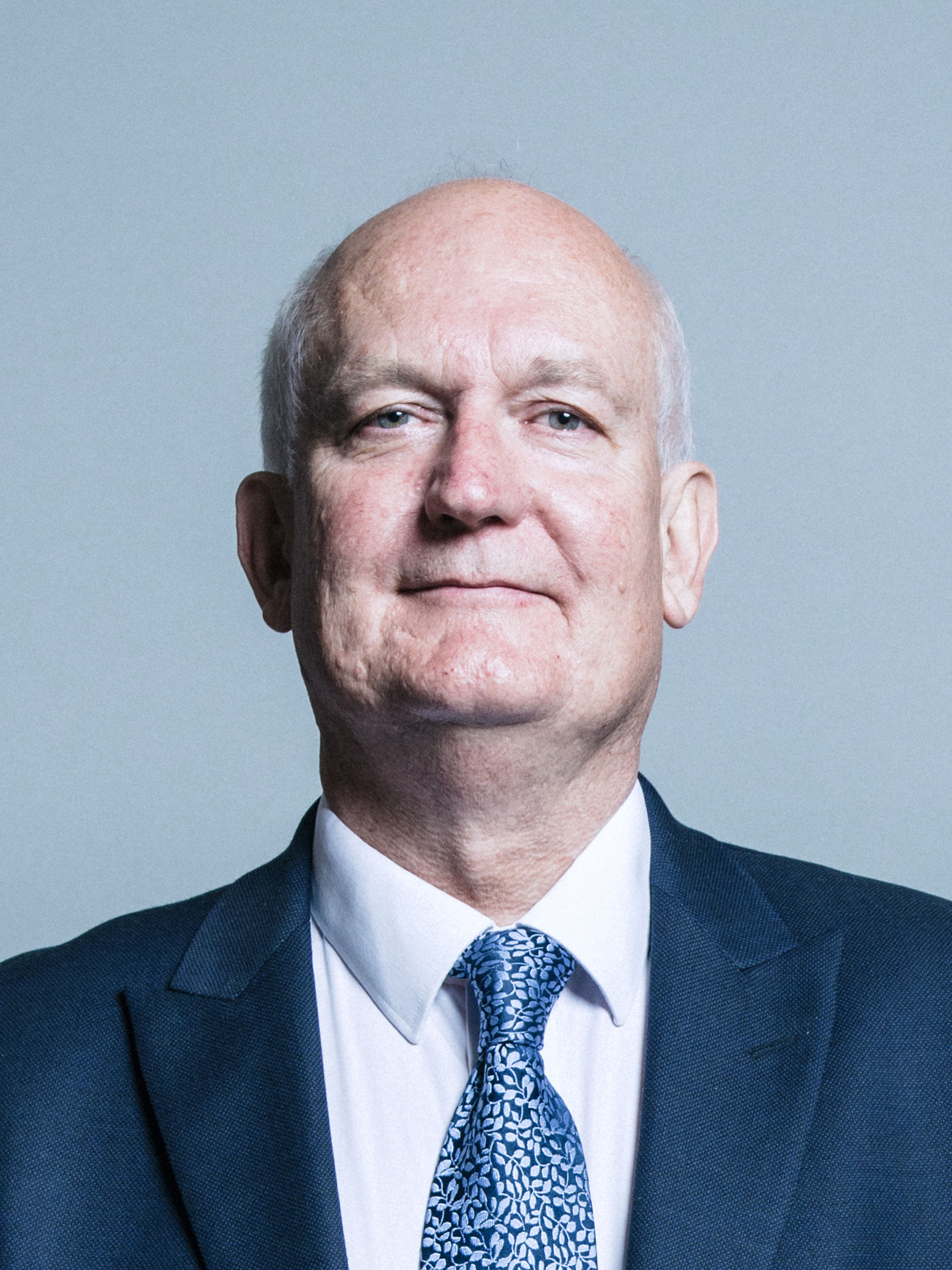
- Official portrait, 2017

Shadow Minister for Wales
- In office 3 July 2017 – 6 November 2019
- Leader: Jeremy Corbyn
- Preceded by: Gerald Jones
- Succeeded by: Gerald Jones (2020)

Member of Parliament for Vale of Clwyd
- In office 8 June 2017 – 6 November 2019
- Preceded by: James Davies
- Succeeded by: James Davies
- In office 1 May 1997 – 30 March 2015
- Preceded by: Constituency established
- Succeeded by: James Davies

Personal details
- Born: 18 July 1958 (age 68) Rhyl, Wales
- Party: Labour
- Spouse: Gill Roberts
- Children: 2
- Education: University College Wales, Aberystwyth; University of Liverpool

Christopher Shaun Ruane OBE (born 18 July 1958) is a Welsh Labour politician who served as the Member of Parliament (MP) for the Vale of Clwyd from 1997 to 2015 and 2017 to 2019.

== Early life ==
Ruane attended Ysgol Mair Roman Catholic primary school in Rhyl. He then attended the Blessed Edward Jones Catholic High School on Cefndy Road, also in Rhyl.

At the University of Wales College, Aberystwyth, he gained a BSc in Economics in 1979. From the University of Liverpool he gained a PGCE in 1980. He was a town councillor from 1988 and the Chairman of West Clwyd NUT region.

He was a primary school teacher from 1982 to 1997, and a deputy head from 1991 to 1997.

== Parliamentary career ==
Ruane contested Clwyd North West in 1992.

He was Parliamentary Private Secretary to Peter Hain from 2003 until his resignation in March 2007 in protest against the decision to replace Trident. In 2003, Ruane voted in favour of the Iraq War.

He lost his seat to Conservative James Davies in the 2015 General Election. However, he successfully stood for re-election in the Vale of Clwyd constituency in the 2017 election. before losing it again.

Ruane was opposed to Brexit prior to the 2016 referendum and supported a second referendum. From 2017 until the 2019 General Election, Ruane served as Labour's Shadow Wales Minister. In his role, he regularly campaigned for the need for greater transparency around the Government's proposed replacement of European Union funding post-Brexit, on the basis that Wales had historically been a net recipient of funding.

As a Parliamentarian, Ruane tabled written parliamentary questions extensively and has regularly been one of the most prolific users of the procedure amongst Members of Parliament. He used written parliamentary questions to highlight the fall in the number of registered voters from 2001 onwards.

In 2013, he worked with Lord Layard and the Oxford Mindfulness Centre to establish mindfulness practice in the UK Parliament. Since then 260 UK parliamentarians and 460 members of their staff have received mindfulness training. In his period out of office, 2015–17, working with the Mindfulness Initiative (MI), he developed links with politicians and mindfulness advocates in 39 legislatures around the world and has helped to establish mindfulness practice in 13 of those legislatures. In 2018, he re-established the All Party Parliamentary Group on Wellbeing Economics in conjunction with former Chief Secretary to the Treasury Lord Gus O'Donnell and Lord Layard and has been a consistent campaigner for embedding wellbeing considerations in public policy formulation and decision making.

In 2019, he again lost his seat to Conservative James Davies in the General Election in December of that year.

== Expenses ==
In October 2012, the Commons Speaker, John Bercow, blocked the release of data showing which MPs were renting their homes in London to other MPs for financial gain. However, a study of parliamentary records was published in The Daily Telegraph. The study showed that 27 MPS, including Ruane receive rental income from their homes in London while simultaneously claiming rental income from the taxpayer to live at another residence. Ruane owns a flat in London which he bought through the use of parliamentary expenses. Ruane claimed £1,906 a month for his London flat. He also owns a flat about three minutes' walk away. He said: "I have acted completely within the rules."

Between January and June 2018, Ruane claimed £9,760. making him the lowest claiming of MPs in North Wales.

== Personal life ==
Ruane is married to Gill Roberts and has two children.

Parliament of the United Kingdom
New constituency	Member of Parliament for Vale of Clwyd; 1997–2015	Succeeded by James Davies
Preceded by James Davies	Member of Parliament for Vale of Clwyd; 2017–present	Succeeded by James Davies
