= Robert Harvey (Clwyd politician) =

British politician (born 1953)

Robert Lambart Harvey (born 21 August 1953) is a British Conservative Party politician, journalist, historian, and author.

== Biography ==
Harvey was educated at Eton College and later at Christ Church, Oxford University where he obtained a BA in 1974 and MA in 1978.

Harvey was foreign affairs lead writer for the Daily Telegraph (1987–1991) and assistant editor of The Economist (1981–1983).

Harvey first stood for Parliament, unsuccessfully, at Caernarvon in October 1974, where he was beaten by the future leader of Plaid Cymru, Dafydd Wigley. Five years later he contested Merioneth, once again being beaten by a Plaid Cymru incumbent, Dafydd Elis-Thomas. In the Conservative landslide of 1983 general election, he was elected to the House of Commons as MP for Clwyd South-West. He became a member of the House of Commons Foreign Affairs Committee. He served for one term before his defeat at the 1987 election by the Labour candidate Martyn Jones.

He was a member of the Wilton Park council (1984–1988) and a member of the advisory board of the Woodrow Wilson Chair of International Politics (1985–1992). He is an active member of the Caux Round Table.

Harvey is a historian and author. In 2007 he edited and introduced the book entitled The World Crisis: The Way Forward after Iraq. His works have been translated into several languages.

The 2009 British film Endgame directed by Pete Travis is based upon Harvey's book The Fall of Apartheid: The Inside History from Smuts to Mbeki.

== Books ==
- Portugal: Birth of a Democracy (1978)
- Blueprint of a Democracy (1978)
- Fire Down Below: A Study of Latin America (1988)
- The Undefeated: The Rise, Fall and Rise of Modern Japan (1994)
- The Return of the Strong: The Drift to Global Disorder (1995)
- Clive: The Life and Death of a British Emperor (1998)
- Liberators: Latin America's Struggle for Independence (2000)
- Cochrane: The Life and Exploits of a Fighting Captain (2000)
- A Few Bloody Noses: The American War of Independence (2001)
- The Fall of Apartheid: The Inside History from Smuts to Mbeki (2002)
- Comrades: The Rise and Fall of World Communism (2003)
- Global Disorder (2003)
- A Short History of Communism (2004)
- The War of Wars: The great European Conflict 1793-1815 (2007)
- The World Crisis: The Way Forward after Iraq, ed. (2007)
- The Mavericks: The Military Commanders who Change the Course of History (2008)
- American Shogun: MacArthur, Hirohito and the American Duel with Japan (2009)
- Romantic Revolutionary: Simon Bolivar and the Struggle for Independence in Latin America (2011)

Parliament of the United Kingdom
New constituency	Member of Parliament for Clwyd South-West; 1983 – 1987	Succeeded by Martyn Jones
