= Simon Baynes =

British politician

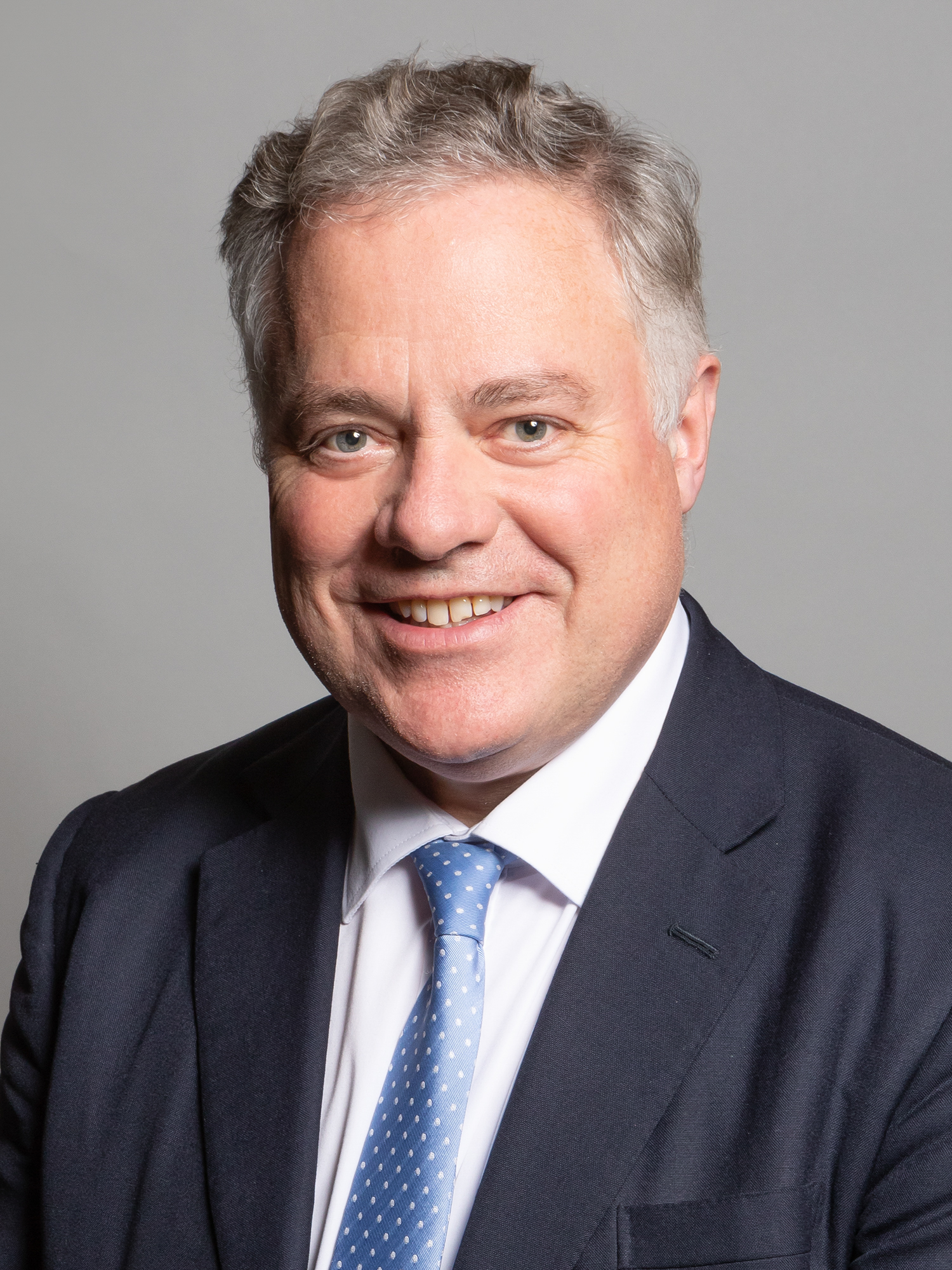
- Official portrait, 2020

Parliamentary Under-Secretary of State for Justice and Tackling Illegal Migration
- In office 8 July 2022 – 8 September 2022
- Prime Minister: Boris Johnson
- Preceded by: Tom Pursglove
- Succeeded by: The Lord Murray of Blidworth

Member of Parliament for Clwyd South
- In office 12 December 2019 – 30 May 2024
- Preceded by: Susan Elan Jones
- Succeeded by: Constituency abolished

Personal details
- Born: 21 April 1960 (age 66) Lesbury, Northumberland, England
- Party: Conservative
- Education: Magdalene College, Cambridge
- Occupation: Politician
- Website: Official website

Simon Robert Maurice Baynes (born 21 April 1960) is a British Conservative former politician who served as the Member of Parliament (MP) for Clwyd South from 2019 to 2024. He served as Parliamentary Under-Secretary of State for Justice and Tackling Illegal Migration from July to September 2022. Baynes worked in finance for J.P. Morgan Cazenove from 1982 to 2006, before running a small bookshop in Shrewsbury.

== Early life and education ==
Baynes was born in Lesbury, Northumberland, the son of Sir John Christopher Malcolm Baynes, 7th Baronet and Shirley Maxwell Baynes (née Dodds). He grew up in Montgomeryshire, where his father ran the Lake Vyrnwy Hotel. He and his father have since co-authored a book on the hotel.

He was privately educated at both Belhaven Hill Preparatory School and Shrewsbury School, before studying at Magdalene College, Cambridge, where he graduated with a BA in History. Whilst at the university, he was a choral exhibitioner and won the Dunster History Essay Prize. He was also President of the Cambridge Union. In 1982, he was Chairman of the Cambridge University Conservative Association.

== Early career ==
Baynes was a partner at Cazenove & Co., and latterly a managing director of JPMorgan Cazenove, from 1982 to 2006. From 2007 to 2011, he was the owner and bookseller of Simon Baynes - Books and Music in Shrewsbury.

He has been a trustee (and was the founder) of Concertina - Music for the Elderly, which he formed in 1998 with his wife. It provides live music in care homes for the elderly. His mother-in-law suffered from dementia. He founded the Bodfach Charitable Trust in 2006, which he is also a trustee of. In addition, he has been a trustee of the Y Dolydd Llanfyllin Workhouse (2005–12), Mid Wales Opera (2012–19), Llangollen International Musical Eisteddfod (2017–19) and Friends of St Myllin's Church (2018–19), the latter of which he is a patron of.

From 2005 to 2012, Baynes was Chairman of North Powys Youth Music. He has also been Chairman of the Welsh Historic Gardens Trust (2016–19) and the Holroyd Community Theatre (2018–19). He was the founder and Chairman of the Montgomeryshire Literary Festival (2018–19). From 2017 to 2019, he was a governor at Llanfyllin High School.

== Political career ==
He stood as the Welsh Conservative candidate in Montgomeryshire in 2005, finishing second behind incumbent Liberal Democrat MP Lembit Öpik. He unsuccessfully sought the Conservative nomination for the seat of South Staffordshire in 2010, losing out to future cabinet minister Gavin Williamson. He then contested Dwyfor Meirionnydd at the 2010 general election, and the same seat in the 2011 National Assembly for Wales Election, both times without success.

Baynes was a Conservative member of Powys County Council from 2008 to 2012, and joint leader of the Conservative group. The following year, he joined Llanfyllin Town Council, where he remained a member until 2019. He served as the mayor of the eponymous Montgomeryshire town of Llanfyllin from 2018 to 2020.

He has contested elections in Clwyd South on three occasions. He first contested Clwyd South in the 2016 Welsh Assembly election. In 2017 he contested the marginal Westminster seat. On all three occasions he finished second. He was elected to Parliament for Clwyd South at the 2019 general election, to serve in the 58th Parliament. He defeated the incumbent Labour MP Susan Elan Jones.

On 2 March 2020, Baynes became a member of the Welsh Affairs Select Committee.

He endorsed Priti Patel in the July 2022 Conservative Party leadership election, but she did not end up standing. He then supported Rishi Sunak.

Clwyd South was abolished at the 2023 Periodic Review of Westminster constituencies, therefore Baynes was selected to fight the neighbouring Liberal Democrat held English seat of North Shropshire for the Conservatives in the 2024 general election. He lost to the incumbent Liberal Democrat MP Helen Morgan by over 30% (15,000 votes).

== Personal life ==
Baynes married his wife Margaret (known as Maggie), an architect, in 1992. They have two daughters.

He lists his recreations as "music (including playing the organ for church services), theatre, concerts, gardening, heritage".

== Publications ==
- (with Sir John Baynes, G. V. Westropp) Lake Vyrnwy: The Story of a Sporting Hotel. United Kingdom, Quiller Publishing, Limited, 2019. ISBN 9781846892981, 1846892988.
- The Forgotten Country House: The Rise and Fall of Roundway Park. United Kingdom, Quiller Press, Limited, 2019. ISBN 9781846893063, 1846893062.

== Electoral history ==
=== 2024 UK general election ===
General election 2024: North Shropshire
Party	Candidate	Votes	%	±%
Liberal Democrats	Helen Morgan	26,214	52.9	+42.9
Conservative	Simon Baynes	10,903	22.0	−39.7
Reform	Mark Whittle	7,687	15.5	+15.5
Labour	Natalie Rowley	3,423	6.9	−15.5
Green	Craig Emery	1,234	2.5	−0.8
Independent	Samuel Cladingbowl	133	0.3	+0.3
Majority		15,311	30.9	−9.7
Turnout		49,594	64.1	−3.8
Registered electors		77,573		
Liberal Democrats gain from Conservative		Swing	+41.3	

=== 2019 UK general election ===
General election 2019: Clwyd South
Party	Candidate	Votes	%	±%
Conservative	Simon Baynes	16,222	44.7	+5.6
Labour	Susan Elan Jones	14,983	41.3	−9.4
Plaid Cymru	Christopher Allen	2,137	5.9	−0.2
Liberal Democrats	Calum Davies	1,496	4.1	+2.2
Brexit Party	Jamie Adams	1,468	4.0	N/A
Rejected ballots		110		
Majority		1,239	3.4	N/A
Turnout		36,306	67.3	−2.4
Registered electors		53,919		
Conservative gain from Labour		Swing	7.5	

=== 2017 UK general election ===
General election 2017: Clwyd South
Party	Candidate	Votes	%	±%
Labour	Susan Elan Jones	19,002	50.7	+13.5
Conservative	Simon Baynes	14,646	39.1	+8.7
Plaid Cymru	Christopher Allen	2,292	6.1	−4.2
UKIP	Jeanette Bassford-Barton	802	2.1	−13.5
Liberal Democrats	Bruce Roberts	731	2.0	−1.8
Rejected ballots		56		
Majority		4,356	11.6	+4.7
Turnout		37,473	68.9	+5.1
Registered electors		54,266		
Labour hold		Swing	+2.4	

=== 2016 Welsh Assembly election ===
Welsh Assembly Election 2016: Clwyd South
Party	Candidate	Votes	%	±%
Labour	Ken Skates	7,862	35.5	−6.9
Conservative	Simon Baynes	4,846	21.9	−7.3
Plaid Cymru	Mabon ap Gwynfor	3,861	17.4	−1.1
UKIP	Mandy Jones	2,827	12.8	+12.8
Liberal Democrats	Aled Roberts	2,289	10.3	+0.5
Green	Duncan Rees	474	2.1	+2.1
Majority		3,016	13.6	+0.3
Turnout		22,159	40.9	+4.0
Labour hold		Swing	+0.2	

=== 2011 Welsh Assembly election ===
Welsh Assembly Election 2011: Dwyfor Meirionnydd
Party	Candidate	Votes	%	±%
Plaid Cymru	Dafydd Elis-Thomas	9,656	46.6	▼13.1
Conservative	Simon Baynes	4,239	20.4	▲0.8
Llais Gwynedd	Louise Hughes	3,225	15.5	N/A
Labour	Martyn Singleton	2,623	12.6	▲0.2
Liberal Democrats	Stephen Churchman	1,000	4.8	▼3.5
Majority		5,417	26.1	▼14.0
Turnout		20,743	46.3	▼1.1
Plaid Cymru hold		Swing	▼7.0	

=== 2010 UK general election ===
General election 2010: Dwyfor Meirionnydd
Party	Candidate	Votes	%	±%
Plaid Cymru	Elfyn Llwyd	12,814	44.3	N/A
Conservative	Simon Baynes	6,447	22.3	N/A
Labour	Alwyn Humphreys	4,021	13.9	N/A
Liberal Democrats	Stephen Churchman	3,538	12.2	N/A
Independent	Louise Hughes	1,310	4.5	N/A
UKIP	Frank Wykes	776	2.7	N/A
Majority		6,367	22.0	N/A
Turnout		28,906	63.7	N/A
Registered electors		45,354		
Plaid Cymru win (new seat)				

=== 2005 UK general election ===
General election 2005: Montgomeryshire
Party	Candidate	Votes	%	±%
Liberal Democrats	Lembit Öpik	15,419	51.2	+1.8
Conservative	Simon Baynes	8,246	27.4	−0.5
Labour	David Tinline	3,454	11.5	−0.4
Plaid Cymru	Ellen ap Gwynn	2,078	6.9	+0.1
UKIP	Clive Easton	900	3.0	+0.3
Majority		7,173	23.8	+2.3
Turnout		30,097	64.4	−1.1
Registered electors		46,766		
Liberal Democrats hold		Swing	+1.2	

== Notes ==
Parliament of the United Kingdom
Preceded by Susan Elan Jones	Member of Parliament for Clwyd South; 2019–2024	Constituency abolished
