= Clwyd North =

UK Parliament constituency (since 2024)

- constituency for the House of Commons
- Interactive map of the constituency.
- Location of the constituency within Wales
- Electorate: 76,150 (March 2020)
- Major settlements: Colwyn Bay, Rhyl, Abergele, St. Asaph, Denbigh

Current constituency
- Member of Parliament: Gill German (Labour)
- Seats: One
- Created from: Clwyd West, Vale of Clwyd

Overlaps
- Senedd: Clwyd

Clwyd North (Welsh: Gogledd Clwyd) is a constituency of the House of Commons in the UK Parliament, first contested at the 2024 general election, following the 2023 review of Westminster constituencies. It is currently represented by Gill German of the Labour Party.

== Boundaries ==
Under the 2023 review, the constituency was defined as being composed of the following, as they existed on 1 December 2020:

- The County Borough of Conwy wards of: Abergele Pensarn, Colwyn, Eirias, Gele, Glyn, Kinmel Bay, Llanddulas, Llandrillo yn Rhos, Llysfaen, Mochdre, Pentre Mawr, Rhiw, and Towyn.
- The County of Denbighshire wards: Bodelwyddan, Denbigh Central, Denbigh Lower, Denbigh Upper/ Henllan, Rhuddlan, Rhyl East, Rhyl South, Rhyl South East, Rhyl South West, Rhyl West, St. Asaph East, St. Asaph West, and Trefnant.

Following local government boundary reviews which came into effect in May 2022, the constituency now comprises the following from the 2024 general election:

- The County Borough of Conwy wards of: Colwyn, Eirias, Gele and Llanddulas, Glyn, Kinmel Bay, Llandrillo-yn-Rhos, Llysfaen, Mochdre, Pen-sarn Pentre Mawr, Rhiw, and Towyn.
- The County of Denbighshire wards: Bodelwyddan, Denbigh Caledfryn Henllan, Denbigh Lower, Rhuddlan, Rhyl East, Rhyl South, Rhyl South West, Rhyl Trellewelyn, Rhyl Tŷ Newydd, Rhyl West, St. Asaph East, St. Asaph West, and Trefnant.

The parts in Conwy were previously part of the abolished constituency of Clwyd West, and the parts in Denbighshire were previously part of the abolished constituency of Vale of Clwyd.

== Members of Parliament ==
Election	Member	Party
2024	Gill German	Labour

== Election results ==
=== Elections in the 2020s ===
General election 2024: Clwyd North
Party	Candidate	Votes	%	±%
Labour	Gill German	14,794	35.5	−4.8
Conservative	Darren Millar	13,598	32.7	−13.1
Reform	Jamie Orange	7,000	16.8	+14.9
Plaid Cymru	Paul Rowlinson	3,159	7.6	+0.4
Liberal Democrats	David Wilkins	1,685	4.0	−0.9
Green	Martyn Hogg	1,391	3.3	N/A
Majority		1,196	2.8	N/A
Turnout		41,627	55.5	−11.9
Registered electors		75,027		
Labour gain from Conservative		Swing	+4.1	

=== Elections in the 2010s ===
2019 notional result (Note: Estimate of the 2019 general election result as if the revised boundaries recommended under the 2023 boundary review were in place)
Party	Vote	%
Conservative	23,479	45.8
Labour	20,645	40.3
Plaid Cymru	3,713	7.2
Liberal Democrats	2,501	4.9
Brexit Party	951	1.9
Majority	2,834	5.5
Turnout	51,289	67.4
Electorate	76,150	
