= Martyn Jones =

British politician

Chair of the Welsh Affairs Committee
- In office 14 July 1997 – 13 July 2005
- Preceded by: Gareth Wardell
- Succeeded by: Hywel Francis

Member of Parliament for Clwyd South Clwyd South West (1987–1997)
- In office 11 June 1987 – 12 April 2010
- Preceded by: Robert Harvey
- Succeeded by: Susan Elan Jones

Personal details
- Born: 1 March 1947 (age 79) Wrexham, Denbighshire, Wales
- Party: Labour

Martyn David Jones (born 1 March 1947) is a former British Labour Party politician who was the Member of Parliament (MP) for Clwyd South from 1987 until his retirement at the 2010 general election.

== Early life ==
Born in Wrexham, he attended Grove Park Grammar School (now Rhosnesni High School) on Penymaes Avenue in Wrexham. He went to Liverpool College of Commerce, then completed a BSc in Microbiology at Liverpool Polytechnic, then an MSc at Trent Polytechnic.

He is a microbiologist, and worked at the Wrexham Lager Beer Company from 1969 until June 1987 before his election to the House of Commons.

== Parliamentary career ==
At the 1987 general election, he was elected as member of Parliament for Clwyd South West, narrowly beating the Conservative incumbent Robert Harvey. He was re-elected at the 1992 general election with an increased majority. His constituency was abolished for the 1997 election, but he was returned to Parliament for the new Clwyd South constituency where his opponent was future Prime Minister Boris Johnson.

Jones was an opposition whip from 1988 to 1992, and under John Smith's leadership of the Labour Party, he was an opposition spokesperson for Food, Agricultural and Rural Affairs from 1994 to 1995. He has been a member of the Welsh Affairs Select committee since 1997, serving as the committee's chair until 2005. He was previously a member of the Agriculture Select Committee.

Jones has been vocal in his criticism of controversial North Wales Police Chief Constable Richard Brunstrom's decision to use images of a dead motorcyclist as part of the force's contentiously zealous campaign for road safety.

In 2006 The Mail on Sunday newspaper reported that Jones had repeatedly swore at a House of Commons Security Officer. Jones denied the Mail's allegations. He took the paper to the High Court to sue them for inaccuracies in the story. He called the article a "grotesque distortion" and was eventually awarded £5,000 in compensation. The paper also had to pay £300,000 in legal costs.

Jones has been a vocal campaigner on the issue of dormant bank accounts in the UK. The MP has campaigned since 2001 for the issue to be brought to the forefront of British political life. His work on the subject was praised by senior ministers, such as the Labour Chancellor of the Exchequer Alistair Darling.

On 7 May 2009, Jones announced that he would retire at the next general election.

== Personal life ==
Jones, who had once been employed by the Wrexham Lager brewery, bought the original name and building in Wrexham for £1 in 2001, in support of the brewery's revival after closure in meantime.

== Offices Held ==
Parliament of the United Kingdom
| Preceded by Robert Harvey | Member of Parliament for Clwyd South West; 1987 – 1997 | Constituency abolished |
| New constituency | Member of Parliament for Clwyd South; 1997 – 2010 | Succeeded by Susan Elan Jones |
