= David Jones (Clwyd West MP) =

Welsh politician (born 1952)

The Right Honourable David Jones
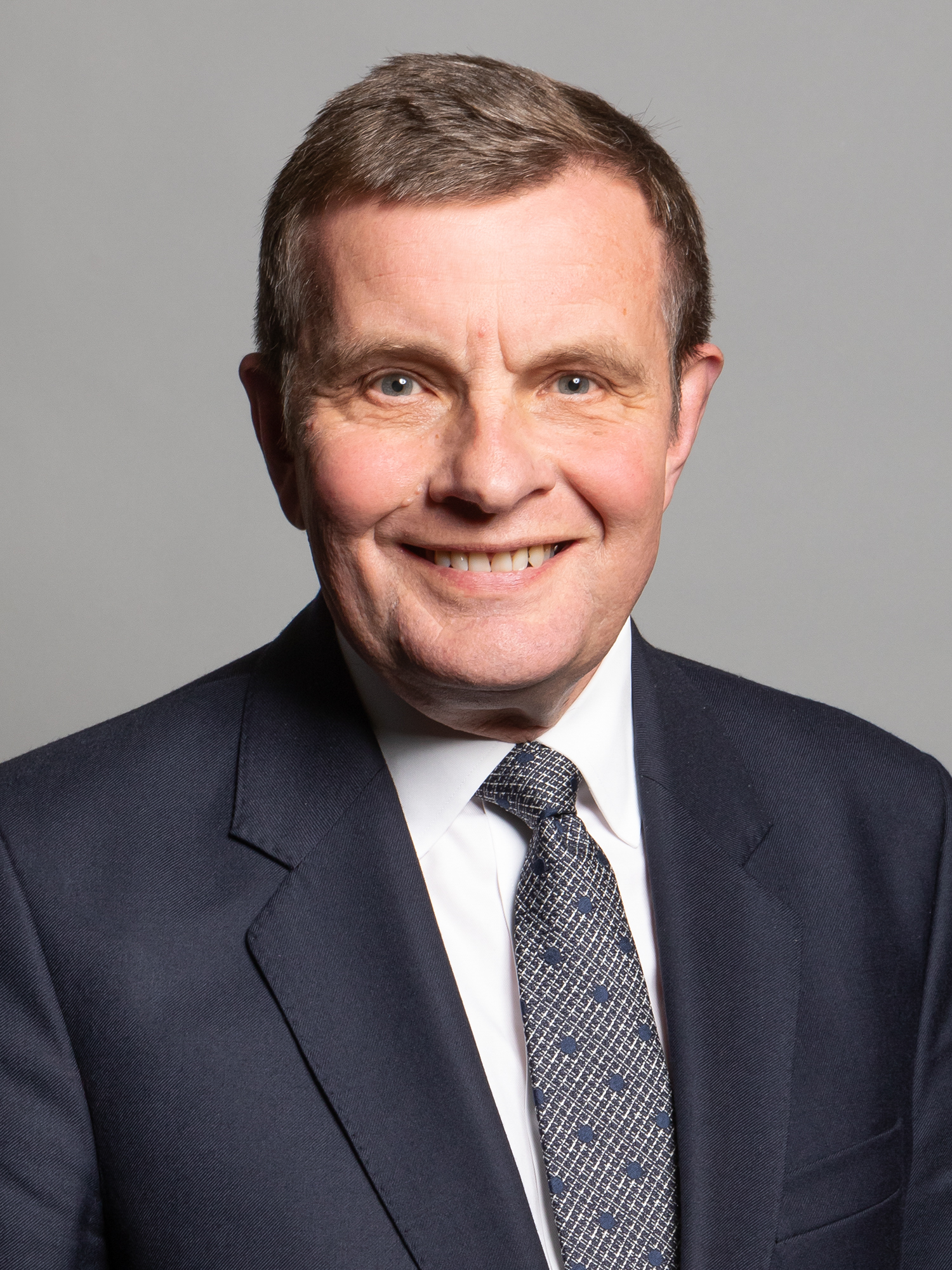
- Official portrait, 2020

Minister of State for Exiting the European Union
- In office 17 July 2016 – 12 June 2017
- Prime Minister: Theresa May
- Preceded by: Office established
- Succeeded by: The Baroness Anelay of St Johns

Secretary of State for Wales
- In office 4 September 2012 – 14 July 2014
- Prime Minister: David Cameron
- Preceded by: Cheryl Gillan
- Succeeded by: Stephen Crabb

Parliamentary Under-Secretary of State for Wales
- In office 11 May 2010 – 4 September 2012
- Prime Minister: David Cameron
- Preceded by: Wayne David
- Succeeded by: Stephen Crabb

Member of Parliament for Clwyd West
- In office 5 May 2005 – 30 May 2024
- Preceded by: Gareth Thomas
- Succeeded by: Constituency abolished

Member of the National Assembly for North Wales
- In office 10 September 2002 – 30 April 2003
- Preceded by: Rod Richards
- Succeeded by: Mark Isherwood

Personal details
- Born: David Ian Jones; 22 March 1952 (age 74) Stepney, London, England
- Party: Reform UK (2025–present)
- Other political affiliations: Conservative (until 2024)
- Spouse: Sara Tudor (m. 1982)
- Children: 2
- Education: University College London; University of Law
- Occupation: Politician; solicitor
- Website: Official website

David Ian Jones (born 22 March 1952) is a British politician and former solicitor, who was previously a member of the Conservative Party and is now a member of Reform UK. He who briefly served as a Welsh Assembly Member for North Wales between 2002 and 2003, and then as Member of Parliament (MP) for Clwyd West from 2005 to 2024. He sat in the Cabinet as Secretary of State for Wales from 2012 to 2014, making him the first Secretary of State for Wales to have served as an Assembly Member.

== Early life ==
David Jones was born in Stepney, London to Welsh parents, Elspeth (née Williams) and Bryn Jones, and is a Welsh speaker. His father was a British Army officer who served in northwest India and later ran pharmacies around the Wrexham area.

He was educated at Ruabon Grammar School, University College London – where he was an active member of UCL Conservative Society – and Chester College of Law.

As a young solicitor he had worked in Ruthin alongside future Plaid Cymru Deputy Welsh First Minister Ieuan Wyn Jones.

== Political career ==
=== Welsh Assembly ===
In 1999 he contested the seat of Conwy in the inaugural Assembly elections. In 2002, Jones unexpectedly became a member of the Welsh Assembly for the North Wales electoral region, filling the seat vacated by the ex-Welsh Office minister Rod Richards, who had resigned for health reasons.

Jones made it clear from the outset that he would not seek re-election to the Assembly and stepped down at the 2003 elections.

=== Parliament ===
At the 2005 general election, Jones was elected as MP for Clwyd West, defeating the sitting Labour Party MP Gareth Thomas by a majority of 133 votes. This was his third candidacy for the Conservative Party in general elections; he had previously contested Conwy at the 1997 election and finished second to Labour's Christine Russell in the City of Chester in at the 2001 general election.

His maiden speech to the House of Commons was on 23 May 2005, when he focused on the needs of his rural constituency and on crime. He also expressed concern about wind farms planned for his constituency (the Gwynt y Môr offshore wind farm, then in the proposal phase, would become one of the biggest wind farms in the United Kingdom).

He was a member of the Welsh Affairs Select Committee from 2005 to 2010, and on 7 November 2006 was appointed Shadow Minister for Wales. He also took a keen interest in law and order issues and was a member of the Conservative Homeland Security team.

He was a member of the socially conservative Cornerstone Group between 2005 and 2007, according to WalesOnline.

On 6 May 2010, Jones was re-elected as Member of Parliament for Clwyd West with a substantially increased majority of 6,419. He was appointed Parliamentary Under Secretary of State at the Wales Office on 13 May 2010 making him the first Conservative officeholder to represent a Welsh constituency since Nicholas Edwards (1979–1987).

He was appointed Secretary of State for Wales on 4 September 2012, following David Cameron's first Cabinet reshuffle, and removed from office in another reshuffle on 14 July 2014. Upon Theresa May's appointment as prime minister in July 2016, Jones was appointed as a Minister of State at the Department for Exiting the European Union. He was subsequently dismissed from this role on 12 June 2017, following the 2017 general election.

A fluent Welsh language speaker, Jones also maintains an active blog. He has been known to give up his activity on social media for Lent.

In February 2013, The Daily Telegraph reported that as Welsh Secretary Jones took a chauffeur-driven Jaguar on a journey of about 100 metres. A spokesman for the Welsh Office said: "The Secretary of State for Wales did travel by car to Cabinet today as he was reading Cabinet papers and briefing until his arrival at Downing Street."

In 2016, Jones joined the political advisory board of Leave Means Leave.

==== Views on same-sex marriage ====
During an interview on ITV Wales Face to Face programme in February 2013, discussing a Parliamentary vote on the Marriage (Same Sex Couples) Bill to legalise same-sex marriage, Jones said: "I was one of two cabinet ministers who did vote against it and it was for various reasons. Certainly in constituency terms, I felt that overwhelmingly the constituents of Clwyd West were opposed to the change. But also I regard marriage as an institution that has developed over many centuries, essentially for the provision of a warm and safe environment for the upbringing of children, which is clearly something that two same-sex partners can't do. Which is not to say that I'm in any sense opposed to stable and committed same-sex partnerships".

The gay rights organisation Stonewall issued a statement expressing disappointment at his comments. In a statement after the interview, Jones said: "I made the point of stressing that I was fully supportive of committed same-sex relationships. I simply sought to point out that, since same-sex partners could not biologically procreate children, the institution of marriage was one that, in my opinion, should be reserved to opposite-sex partners."

==== Blog ====
In 2014, Jones was accused by fellow MP Guto Bebb of being co-author of the blog "Thoughts of Oscar". Jones denied having anything to do with the blog, for which local newsagent Nigel Roberts claimed full responsibility. Richie Windmill, the leader of the "Victims of Oscar" action group, was arrested in October 2015, along with his wife, on suspicion of harassment, but were released without charge. They claimed the arrest was an act of revenge for exposing David Jones as a major contributor to the blog and accused him of using his Masonic connections to arrange their arrests.

=== Defection to Reform UK ===
In 2025 Jones resigned from the Conservatives and joined Reform UK. In a statement, Jones said that he had become disillusioned with the Conservatives, feeling that only Reform UK was "demonstrating the determination needed to tackle the country's many problems", and that Reform was now the party that best represents his views. He added that he has no plans to stand in any elections under the Reform banner in the foreseeable future, but that he would "give the party [his] full support".

== Secretary of State for Wales and Minister for Brexit ==
On 4 September 2012, Jones was promoted to Secretary of State for Wales, and he was in consequence appointed to the Privy Council on 10 September.

Jones stated his top priorities would be to promote economic growth and deliver major infrastructure projects including a new nuclear power station at the Wylfa site on Anglesey, upgrades to rail lines in North Wales and improvements to the M4 motorway and the A55, and exploiting the full economic potential of the Holyhead and Milford Haven Waterway ports.

Issues with the Welsh Government included a Supreme Court challenge by Her Majesty's Government to legislation passed in the Welsh Assembly about local government byelaws and the Welsh government's objection to a Wales Office consultation on changing the boundaries of assembly constituencies.

Jones described the Welsh Government's renewable energy planning guideline, Tan 8, as "an atrocity".

Following Jones leading the Welsh arm of the Vote Leave campaign for the EU referendum, he was appointed as a government Brexit minister in July 2016 under Theresa May. In June 2017, following a reshuffle by her, Jones lost his position.

== Personal life ==
Jones has been married to Sara Tudor, a former nurse, since 1982. The couple have two sons.

Jones is a supporter of Liverpool F.C. Jones declared membership of the Freemasons, although he wrote in 2009 he had not been an active member for many years.

== See also ==
- List of Welsh AMs/MSs with the shortest service

== Bibliography ==
- https://www.bbc.co.uk/news/uk-wales-politics-29141800
- http://www.legislation.gov.uk/ukpga/1983/2
- http://www.dailypost.co.uk/news/north-wales-news/llandudno-couple-suing-north-wales-11361115

Senedd
| Preceded by Rod Richards | Member of the National Assembly for North Wales; 2002–2003 | Succeeded by Mark Isherwood |
Parliament of the United Kingdom
| Preceded by Gareth Thomas | Member of Parliament for Clwyd West; 2005–2024 | Constituency abolished |
Political offices
| Preceded by Cheryl Gillan | Secretary of State for Wales; 2012–2014 | Succeeded by Stephen Crabb |
| Preceded by David Lidington as Minister of State for Europe | Minister of State for Exiting the European Union; 2016–2017 | Succeeded by The Baroness Anelay of St Johns |
