= James Davies (politician) =

British Conservative politician (born 1980)

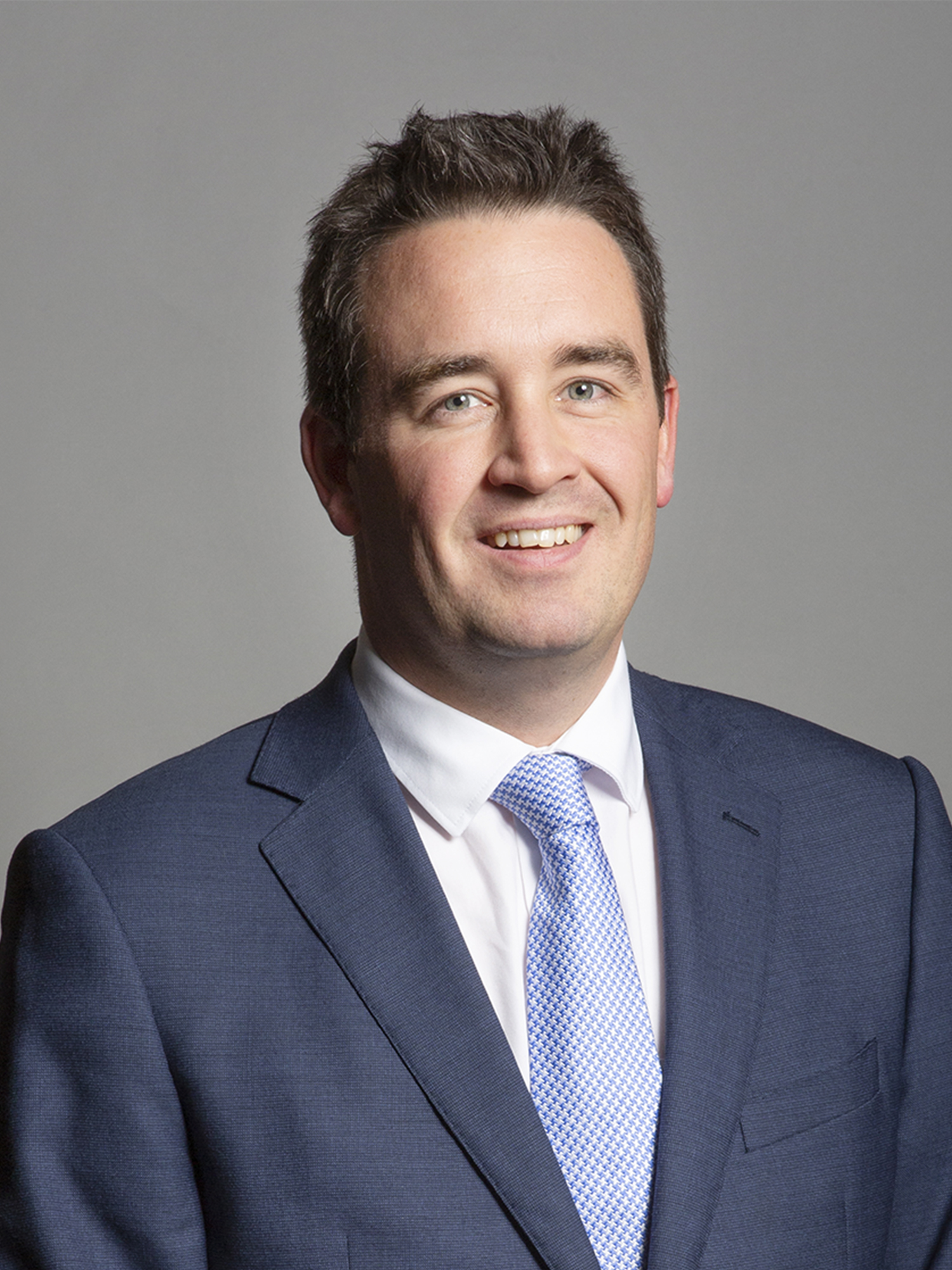
- Official portrait, 2019

Parliamentary Under-Secretary of State for Wales
- In office 27 October 2022 – 13 November 2023
- Prime Minister: Rishi Sunak
- Preceded by: David TC Davies
- Succeeded by: Fay Jones

Member of Parliament for Vale of Clwyd
- In office 12 December 2019 – 30 May 2024
- Preceded by: Chris Ruane
- Succeeded by: Constituency abolished
- In office 7 May 2015 – 3 May 2017
- Preceded by: Chris Ruane
- Succeeded by: Chris Ruane

Personal details
- Born: 27 February 1980 (age 46) St Asaph, Wales
- Party: Conservative
- Education: Christ's College, Cambridge
- Website: www.jamesdavies.org.uk

James Michael Davies (born 27 February 1980) is a British Conservative Party politician and medical doctor who was the Member of Parliament (MP) for the Vale of Clwyd from 2019 to 2024, having previously held the seat from 2015 to 2017. He served as Parliamentary Under-Secretary of State for Wales between October 2022 and November 2023.

Davies unsuccessfully contested the new constituency of Clwyd East at the 2024 general election.

== Early life and career ==
Davies was born in St Asaph in his constituency, tracing his lineage there back seven generations. He was educated at the private King's School, Chester before going on to study at Christ's College, Cambridge, gaining three degrees: a BA, a MB BChir in 2004, and an MA in 2005. He is a Member of the Royal College of General Practitioners, specialising in dementia. Davies was elected to Denbighshire County Council in 2004, remaining a member until 2015. He represented the Prestatyn East ward. He was on the party list in North Wales at the 2007 National Assembly for Wales election.

== Parliamentary career ==
At the 2015 general election, he was elected as the Member of Parliament (MP) for Vale of Clwyd with 39% of the vote, ahead of incumbent Chris Ruane of Labour on 38.4%. Ruane had held the seat for 18 years, and Davies received 237 more votes than his opponent. He lost his seat at the 2017 general election, but returned to Parliament at the 2019 election.

In September 2020, Davies received criticism on social media for asking Prime Minister Boris Johnson to comment on the news that the 2020 series of I'm A Celebrity...Get Me Out Of Here! would be filmed in Gwrych Castle in Abergele, North Wales instead of New South Wales Australia, during a Prime Minister's Questions session that was otherwise dominated by question's relating to the government's coronavirus response.

Davies was appointed Parliamentary Private Secretary to the Department of Health and Social Care in September 2021. He resigned this position on 6 July 2022 alongside many other ministers.

In June 2023 he was selected as the Conservative prospective parliamentary candidate for the new constituency of Clwyd East, a seat which contained around one third of the now abolished Vale of Clwyd. At the 2024 general election, Davies was defeated by Labour candidate, Becky Gittins.

== Policies and views ==
In February 2015, Davies expressed concern over plans to scrap Doctor-led maternity care and services for miscarriages and ectopic pregnancies at Ysbyty Glan Clwyd, stating "The 'temporary' arrangements would mean any elective surgery requiring an overnight stay being transferred to Wrexham or Bangor. The same would apply to early pregnancy unit assessments, meaning inconvenience to many women and their families."

== Voting record ==
On the majority of issues Davies casts his votes in line with other Conservative MPs. However, he diverged from party lines on some issues.

Davies voted against investigations into the Iraq War, the majority of his party voted for. Davies voted for requiring pub companies to offer pub landlords rent-only leases, most of his party voted against.

He voted to trigger Article 50 before April 2017.

== Personal life ==
Davies married Nina Jones in 2012; they have two young sons.

Outside of politics, he lists his recreations as "travelling, walking, languages, local community regeneration, cinema, real ale and dining out, DIY". He is a member of the Carlton Club.

Parliament of the United Kingdom
Preceded by Chris Ruane	Member of Parliament for Vale of Clwyd; 2015–2017	Succeeded by Chris Ruane
Preceded by Chris Ruane	Member of Parliament for Vale of Clwyd; 2019–2024	Constituency abolished
Political offices
Preceded by David TC Davies	Parliamentary Under-Secretary of State for Wales; 2022–2023	Succeeded by Fay Jones
