= Vale of Clwyd (UK Parliament constituency) =

UK Parliament constituency (1997–2024)

Coordinates: 53°15′27″N 3°24′26″W

- Former county constituency for the House of Commons
- Boundary of Vale of Clwyd in Wales
- Preserved county: Clwyd
- Electorate: 55,925 (December 2018)
- Major settlements: Rhyl, Prestatyn, Denbigh, St Asaph, Rhuddlan, Trefnant, Tremeirchion, Bodelwyddan.

1997–2024
- Seats: One
- Created from: Clwyd North West, Delyn, Clwyd South West
- Replaced by: Clwyd East, Clwyd North
- Senedd: Vale of Clwyd, North Wales

The Vale of Clwyd (Welsh: Dyffryn Clwyd) was a constituency of the House of Commons of the UK Parliament created in 1997. As with all seats it elected one Member of Parliament (MP) by the first past the post system at least every five years.

The Vale of Clwyd Senedd constituency was created with the same boundaries in 1999 (as an Assembly constituency).

The constituency was abolished as part of the 2023 Periodic Review of Westminster constituencies and under the June 2023 final recommendations of the Boundary Commission for Wales. Its area was split between Clwyd East and Clwyd North, to be first contested at the 2024 general election.

== Boundaries ==
Map of boundaries 2010-2024

1997–2010: The Borough of Rhuddlan, the District of Glyndwr wards of Denbigh Central, Denbigh Lower, Denbigh Upper, Henllan, and Llandyrnog, and the Borough of Colwyn ward of Trefnant.

2010–2024: The Denbighshire County electoral divisions of Bodelwyddan, Denbigh Central, Denbigh Lower, Denbigh Upper/Henllan, Dyserth, Llandyrnog, Prestatyn Central, Prestatyn East, Prestatyn Meliden, Prestatyn North, Prestatyn South West, Rhuddlan, Rhyl East, Rhyl South, Rhyl South East, Rhyl South West, Rhyl West, St Asaph East, St Asaph West, Trefnant, and Tremeirchion.

The constituency was created in 1997 from the seats of Clwyd North West, Clwyd South West and Delyn. It was in the north of Wales, containing the seaside town of Prestatyn and its coastal neighbour Rhyl which is overlooked by the community of Rhuddlan. It also contained the inland towns of Denbigh, St Asaph, Bodelwyddan, Trefnant and Tremeirchion.

== Political history ==
The seat was won by the Labour candidate in 1997, 2001, 2005 and on a marginal majority in 2010. The seat was next won by the Conservative candidate standing in 2015. The 2015 result gave the seat the 4th most marginal majority of the Conservative Party's 331 seats by percentage of majority. However, Labour regained the seat in the 2017 general election with more than half the eligible votes, the first Labour gain from the Conservatives on the night. In 2019 general election, the seat reverted to the Conservatives as the party made gains from Labour in north east Wales.

== Members of Parliament ==
Election	Member	Party
1997	Chris Ruane	Labour
2015	James Davies	Conservative
2017	Chris Ruane	Labour
2019	James Davies	Conservative
2024	Constituency abolished	

== Elections ==
=== Elections in the 1990s ===
General election 1997: Vale of Clwyd
Party	Candidate	Votes	%	±%
Labour	Chris Ruane	20,617	52.7	N/A
Conservative	David Edwards	11,662	29.8	N/A
Liberal Democrats	Daniel Munford	3,425	8.8	N/A
Plaid Cymru	Gwyneth Kensler	2,301	5.9	N/A
Referendum	Simon Vickers	834	2.1	N/A
UKIP	Scott Cooke	293	0.7	N/A
Majority		8,995	22.9	N/A
Turnout		39,132	74.6	N/A
Registered electors		52,426		
Labour win (new seat)				

=== Elections in the 2000s ===
General election 2001: Vale of Clwyd
Party	Candidate	Votes	%	±%
Labour	Chris Ruane	16,179	50.0	―2.7
Conservative	Brendan Murphy	10,418	32.2	+2.4
Liberal Democrats	Graham Rees	3,058	9.5	+0.7
Plaid Cymru	John Williams	2,300	7.1	+1.2
UKIP	William Campbell	391	1.2	+0.5
Majority		5,761	17.8	―5.1
Turnout		32,346	63.6	―11.0
Registered electors		50,842		
Labour hold		Swing	―2.5	

General election 2005: Vale of Clwyd
Party	Candidate	Votes	%	±%
Labour	Chris Ruane	14,875	46.0	―4.0
Conservative	Felicity Elphick	10,206	31.6	―0.6
Liberal Democrats	Elizabeth Jewkes	3,820	11.8	+2.3
Plaid Cymru	Mark Jones	2,309	7.1	±0.0
Independent	Mark Young	442	1.4	N/A
UKIP	Edna Khambatta	375	1.2	±0.0
Legalise Cannabis	Jeff Ditchfield	286	0.9	N/A
Majority		4,669	14.4	―3.4
Turnout		32,313	62.2	―1.4
Registered electors		51,983		
Labour hold		Swing	―1.7	

=== Elections in the 2010s ===
General election 2010: Vale of Clwyd
Party	Candidate	Votes	%	±%
Labour	Chris Ruane	15,017	42.3	―3.6
Conservative	Matt Wright	12,508	35.2	+3.5
Liberal Democrats	Paul Penlington	4,472	12.6	+0.7
Plaid Cymru	Caryl Wyn-Jones	2,068	5.8	―1.4
BNP	Ian Si'Ree	827	2.3	N/A
UKIP	Tom Turner	515	1.4	+0.3
Alliance for Green Socialism	Mike Butler	127	0.4	N/A
Rejected ballots		55		
Majority		2,509	7.1	―7.3
Turnout		35,534	63.7	―2.1
Registered electors		55,781		
Labour hold		Swing	―3.6	

Of the 55 rejected ballots:

- 32 were either unmarked or it was uncertain who the vote was for.
- 23 voted for more than one candidate.

General election 2015: Vale of Clwyd
Party	Candidate	Votes	%	±%
Conservative	James Davies	13,760	39.0	+3.8
Labour	Chris Ruane	13,523	38.4	―3.9
UKIP	Paul Davies-Cooke	4,577	13.0	+11.6
Plaid Cymru	Mair Rowlands	2,486	7.1	+1.3
Liberal Democrats	Gwyn Williams	915	2.6	―10.0
Rejected ballots		77		
Majority		237	0.6	N/A
Turnout		35,261	62.4	―1.3
Registered electors		56,505		
Conservative gain from Labour		Swing	+3.9	

Of the 77 rejected ballots:

- 60 were either unmarked or it was uncertain who the vote was for.
- 16 voted for more than one candidate.
- 1 had writing or mark by which the voter could be identified.

General election 2017: Vale of Clwyd
Party	Candidate	Votes	%	±%
Labour	Chris Ruane	19,423	50.2	+11.8
Conservative	James Davies	17,044	44.1	+5.1
Plaid Cymru	David Wyatt	1,551	4.0	―3.1
Liberal Democrats	Gwyn Williams	666	1.7	―0.9
Rejected ballots		91		
Majority		2,379	6.1	N/A
Turnout		38,684	68.0	+5.6
Registered electors		56,890		
Labour gain from Conservative		Swing	+3.5	

Of the 91 rejected ballots:

- 72 were either unmarked or it was uncertain who the vote was for.
- 18 voted for more than one candidate.
- 1 had writing or mark by which the voter could be identified.

General election 2019: Vale of Clwyd
Party	Candidate	Votes	%	±%
Conservative	James Davies	17,270	46.4	+2.3
Labour	Chris Ruane	15,443	41.5	―8.7
Plaid Cymru	Glenn Swingler	1,552	4.2	+0.2
Brexit Party	Peter Dain	1,477	4.0	N/A
Liberal Democrats	Gavin Scott	1,471	4.0	+2.3
Rejected ballots		84		
Majority		1,827	4.9	N/A
Turnout		37,213	65.7	―2.3
Registered electors		56,649		
Conservative gain from Labour		Swing	+5.5	

Of the 84 rejected ballots:

- 76 were either unmarked or it was uncertain who the vote was for.
- 8 voted for more than one candidate.

== See also ==
- Vale of Clwyd (Senedd constituency)
- List of parliamentary constituencies in Clwyd
- List of parliamentary constituencies in Wales
