= Susan Elan Jones =

British Labour politician

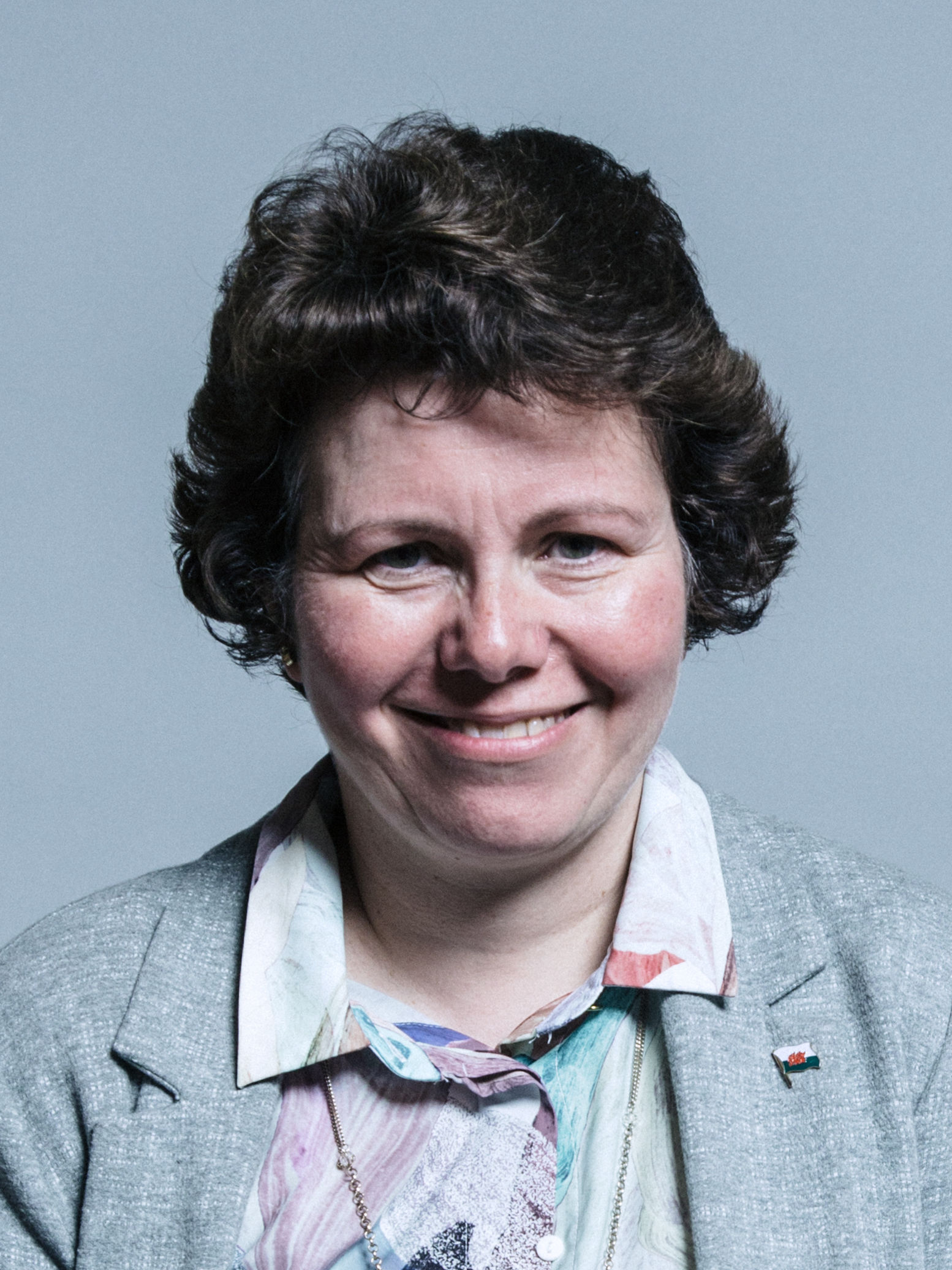
- Official portrait, 2017

Shadow Minister for Wales
- In office 18 September 2015 – 27 June 2016
- Leader: Jeremy Corbyn
- Preceded by: Nia Griffith
- Succeeded by: Gerald Jones

Member of Parliament for Clwyd South
- In office 6 May 2010 – 6 November 2019
- Preceded by: Martyn Jones
- Succeeded by: Simon Baynes

Southwark Borough Councillor for The Lane ward
- In office 4 May 2006 – 11 November 2009
- Preceded by: Aubyn Graham
- Succeeded by: Nick Dolezal

Personal details
- Born: 1 June 1968 (age 58) Ponciau, Wrexham, Wales, UK
- Party: Welsh Labour

Susan Elan Jones (born 1 June 1968) is a British former Labour Party politician. She was elected at the 2010 general election as the Member of Parliament (MP) for Clwyd South, replacing the previous Labour MP Martyn Jones after his retirement. She returned to the voluntary sector after leaving Parliament.

== Biography ==
Jones comes from Ponciau near Rhosllannerchrugog and studied at Bristol University and Cardiff University. She worked as a charity manager and professional fundraiser for 15 years before becoming an MP.

In the 1997 general election, Jones stood for Labour in Surrey Heath, coming third. From 2006 to 2009 she was a councillor in the London Borough of Southwark and was deputy leader of the opposition from 2007 to 2009.

== Parliamentary career ==
Following the 2010 general election, as the new Member of Parliament for Clwyd South, Jones took her Parliamentary Oath of Allegiance to the Queen in Welsh; she is fluent in the language.

When making her maiden speech in the House of Commons of the United Kingdom on 9 June 2010 Jones spoke of the historic discrimination faced by speakers of the Welsh language. In her speech, she compared the ordinary people who campaigned for the Welsh language at times when it had not been fashionable to do so as civil rights activists "in the mould of Mrs Rosa Parks". During her time as MP she returned to the issue in her speeches in the Commons, including on the Welsh television channel S4C and campaigned successfully for Welsh to be used in Parliament at meetings of the Welsh Grand Committee

She campaigned on military issues, and used her first appearance at Prime Minister's Questions to support a Royal British Legion campaign against the planned abolition of the Chief Coroner's office, which they argued would have undermined the independence and quality of investigations into military deaths. Prime Minister David Cameron reversed his decision two weeks later and announced that the service would not be scrapped. She assailed Conservative Justice Secretary Kenneth Clarke over "secret inquests" opposed by military families, provoking a "swipe" at the Royal British Legion from the Minister.

She frequently backed various local business interests in parliamentary debates, including solar panel businesses concerned about cuts to subsidies for domestic solar panels, and wood panelling businesses which employ many people in the Clwyd South constituency.

Jones strongly advocated the publication of all MPs' expenses and published her own expense claims on her website each month. She is a past recipient of the Brake Parliamentarian of the Year award for her campaigning on road safety.

From October 2010 to October 2011, Jones served as Parliamentary Private Secretary to Harriet Harman MP, the Deputy Leader of the Labour Party, in her role as Shadow Secretary of State for International Development. In the October 2011 reshuffle, Jones was appointed to the Labour front bench as a Whip.

Jones resigned from Jeremy Corbyn's Shadow Ministerial Team, along with dozens of her colleagues, in June 2016 and, in calling Corbyn "unelectable", also urged him to resign as Labour leader. She supported Owen Smith in the failed attempt to replace Jeremy Corbyn in the 2016 Labour leadership election. Via a statement on her website, Jones called Brexit "a disaster" and supported the campaign for a People's Vote on the final Brexit deal. Jones is a proponent of proportional representation and a supporter of the Labour Campaign for Electoral Reform.

She was defeated in the 2019 United Kingdom general election.

== Voluntary Sector ==
Susan Elan Jones returned to the voluntary sector after leaving Parliament. As an MP, she was Co-Chair of the All Party Parliamentary Group for Charities and Volunteering. She served as a member of the Bill Committees for the Small Charitable Donations Bill, the Small Charitable Donations and Childcare Payments Bill and the National Citizen Service Bill. Jones co-authored the 'Red Book of the Voluntary Sector' (CAF/ACEVO,2015) and has also written on social enterprises and Corporate Social Responsibility. She is a regular platform speaker at voluntary sector conferences and events. Jones introduced the Charity Trustees (Time Off for Duties) Bill to Parliament in March 2019.

Parliament of the United Kingdom
Preceded by Martyn Jones	Member of Parliament for Clwyd South; 2010–2019	Succeeded by Simon Baynes
