= Clwyd South (UK Parliament constituency) =

UK Parliament constituency (1997–2024)

Coordinates: 52°56′25″N 3°06′51″W

- Former county constituency for the House of Commons
- Boundary of Clwyd South in Wales
- Preserved county: Clwyd
- Electorate: 54,895 (December 2010)
- Major settlements: Chirk, Corwen, Ruabon, Rhosllannerchrugog, Llangollen, Coedpoeth

1997–2024
- Seats: One
- Created from: Clwyd South West, Wrexham
- Senedd: Clwyd South, North Wales

Clwyd South (Welsh: De Clwyd) was a constituency of the House of Commons of the Parliament of the United Kingdom (Westminster). The constituency was created in 1997, and it elected one Member of Parliament (MP) by the first past the post method of election.

The Clwyd South Senedd constituency was created with the same boundaries in 1999 (as an Assembly constituency).

The constituency was abolished as part of the 2023 Periodic Review of Westminster constituencies and under the June 2023 final recommendations of the Boundary Commission for Wales. Its wards were split between Clwyd East, Dwyfor Meirionnydd, Montgomeryshire and Glyndŵr, and Wrexham.

== Boundaries ==
Map of boundaries 2010-2024

The constituency straddled the authorities of Denbighshire and the borough of Wrexham. Main population centres included the suburbs of Ruabon, Chirk, Rhosllannerchrugog, Cefn Mawr and Coedpoeth to the south of the city of Wrexham, in addition to Llangollen and Corwen further up the Dee valley to the west. Until the 2010 election, the constituency included a small part of the preserved county of Powys. This anomaly was resolved by the Boundary Commission for Wales with the boundaries first used in 2010.

The constituency comprised the following electoral wards:

- From Wrexham: Overton, Bronington, Dyffryn Ceiriog/Ceiriog Valley, Chirk North, Gwenfro, Johnstown, Llangollen Rural, Marchwiel, Penycae, Penycae and Ruabon South, Plas Madoc, Ponciau, Ruabon, Bryn Cefn, Minera, Brymbo, Coedpoeth, Cefn, Chirk South, Esclusham, New Broughton, Pant
- From Denbighshire: Corwen, Llangollen, Llandrillo

== Members of Parliament ==
Election	Member	Party
1997	Martyn Jones	Labour
2010	Susan Elan Jones	Labour
2019	Simon Baynes	Conservative
2024	Constituency abolished	

== Elections ==
=== Elections in the 1990s ===
General election 1997: Clwyd South
Party	Candidate	Votes	%	±%
Labour	Martyn Jones	22,901	58.1	N/A
Conservative	Boris Johnson	9,091	23.1	N/A
Liberal Democrats	Andrew Chadwick	3,684	9.4	N/A
Plaid Cymru	Gareth Williams	2,500	6.3	N/A
Referendum	Alex Lewis	1,207	3.1	N/A
Majority		13,810	35.0	N/A
Turnout		39,383	73.6	N/A
Registered electors		53,495		
Labour win (new seat)				

=== Elections in the 2000s ===
General election 2001: Clwyd South
Party	Candidate	Votes	%	±%
Labour	Martyn Jones	17,217	51.4	−6.7
Conservative	Tom Biggins	8,319	24.8	+1.7
Plaid Cymru	Dyfed Edwards	3,982	11.9	+5.6
Liberal Democrats	David Griffiths	3,426	10.2	+0.8
UKIP	Edwina Theunissen	552	1.6	N/A
Majority		8,898	26.6	−8.4
Turnout		33,496	62.4	−11.2
Registered electors		53,680		
Labour hold		Swing	-4.2	

General election 2005: Clwyd South
Party	Candidate	Votes	%	±%
Labour	Martyn Jones	14,808	45.0	−6.4
Conservative	Tom Biggins	8,460	25.7	+0.9
Liberal Democrats	Deric Burnham	5,105	15.5	+5.3
Plaid Cymru	Mark Strong	3,111	9.4	−2.5
Forward Wales	Alwyn Humphreys	803	2.4	N/A
UKIP	Nick Powell	644	2.0	+0.4
Rejected ballots		298		
Majority		6,348	19.3	−7.3
Turnout		32,931	62.9	+0.5
Registered electors		52,353		
Labour hold		Swing	-3.7	

Of the 298 rejected ballots:

- 273 were either unmarked or it was uncertain who the vote was for.
- 16 voted for more than one candidate.
- 8 had writing or mark by which the voter could be identified.
- 1 had want of official mark.

=== Elections in the 2010s ===
General election 2010: Clwyd South
Party	Candidate	Votes	%	±%
Labour	Susan Elan Jones	13,311	38.4	−6.8
Conservative	John Bell	10,477	30.2	+4.8
Liberal Democrats	Bruce Roberts	5,965	17.2	+1.7
Plaid Cymru	Janet Ryder	3,009	8.7	−0.8
BNP	Sarah Hynes	1,100	3.2	N/A
UKIP	Nick Powell	819	2.4	+0.4
Majority		2,834	8.2	−11.1
Turnout		34,681	64.5	+3.3
Registered electors		53,748		
Labour hold		Swing	-5.8	

General election 2015: Clwyd South
Party	Candidate	Votes	%	±%
Labour	Susan Elan Jones	13,051	37.2	−1.2
Conservative	David Nicholls	10,649	30.4	+0.2
UKIP	Mandy Jones	5,480	15.6	+13.2
Plaid Cymru	Mabon ap Gwynfor	3,620	10.3	+1.6
Liberal Democrats	Bruce Roberts	1,349	3.8	−13.4
Green	Duncan Rees	915	2.6	N/A
Rejected ballots		55		
Majority		2,402	6.8	−1.4
Turnout		35,064	63.8	−0.7
Registered electors		54,996		
Labour hold		Swing	-0.7	

Of the 55 rejected ballots:

- 39 were either unmarked or it was uncertain who the vote was for.
- 15 voted for more than one candidate.
- 1 had writing or mark by which the voter could be identified.

General election 2017: Clwyd South
Party	Candidate	Votes	%	±%
Labour	Susan Elan Jones	19,002	50.7	+13.5
Conservative	Simon Baynes	14,646	39.1	+8.7
Plaid Cymru	Christopher Allen	2,293	6.1	−4.2
UKIP	Jeanette Bassford-Barton	802	2.1	−13.5
Liberal Democrats	Bruce Roberts	731	2.0	−1.8
Rejected ballots		56		
Majority		4,356	11.6	+4.8
Turnout		37,473	68.9	+5.1
Registered electors		54,266		
Labour hold		Swing	+2.4	

Of the 56 rejected ballots:

- 38 were either unmarked or it was uncertain who the vote was for.
- 18 voted for more than one candidate.

General election 2019: Clwyd South
Party	Candidate	Votes	%	±%
Conservative	Simon Baynes	16,222	44.7	+5.6
Labour	Susan Elan Jones	14,983	41.3	−9.4
Plaid Cymru	Christopher Allen	2,137	5.9	−0.2
Liberal Democrats	Calum Davies	1,496	4.1	+2.1
Brexit Party	Jamie Adams	1,468	4.0	N/A
Rejected ballots		110		
Majority		1,239	3.4	N/A
Turnout		36,306	67.3	−1.6
Registered electors		53,919		
Conservative gain from Labour		Swing	+7.5	

Of the 110 rejected ballots:

- 92 were either unmarked or it was uncertain who the vote was for.
- 18 voted for more than one candidate.

== See also ==
- Clwyd South (Senedd constituency)
- List of parliamentary constituencies in Clwyd
- List of parliamentary constituencies in Wales
