= Clwyd West (UK Parliament constituency) =

UK Parliament constituency (1997–2024)

Coordinates: 53°08′35″N 3°27′38″W

- Former county constituency for the House of Commons
- Boundary of Clwyd West in Wales
- Preserved county: Clwyd
- Electorate: 56,845 (December 2018)
- Major settlements: Abergele, Colwyn Bay, Ruthin

1997–2024
- Seats: One
- Created from: Clwyd South West and Clwyd North West
- Replaced by: Bangor Aberconwy, Clwyd East, Clwyd North
- Senedd: Clwyd West, North Wales

Clwyd West (Welsh: Gorllewin Clwyd) was a constituency in Wales represented in the House of Commons of the UK Parliament. It elected one Member of Parliament (MP) by the first past the post system of election. Its last MP was David Jones of the Conservative Party, first elected at the 2005 general election and who also served as Secretary of State for Wales from September 2012 until July 2014.

The constituency was abolished as part of the 2023 Periodic Review of Westminster constituencies and under the June 2023 final recommendations of the Boundary Commission for Wales. Its wards were split between Bangor Aberconwy, Clwyd East and Clwyd North.

== Boundaries ==
Map of boundaries 2010-2024

Following the Fifth Periodic Review of Westminster constituencies, as confirmed by The Parliamentary Constituencies and Assembly Electoral Regions (Wales) Order 2006, the constituency of Clwyd West was formed from the following electoral wards:

- In Conwy County Borough: Abergele Pensarn, Betws yn Rhos, Colwyn, Eirias, Gele, Glyn, Kinmel Bay, Llanddulas, Llandrillo yn Rhos, Llanfair Talhaiarn, Llangernyw, Llansannan, Llysfaen, Mochdre, and Towyn
- In Denbighshire County: Efenechtyd, Llanarmon-yn-Ial/Llandegla, Llanbedr Dyffryn Clwyd/Llangynhafal, Llanfair Dyffryn Clwyd/Gwyddelwern, Llanrhaeadr-yng-Nghinmeirch, and Ruthin.

== History ==
The constituency was created in 1997 from parts of the seats of Clwyd South West and Clwyd North West. In the 2005 election this constituency was the Conservative Party's twentieth target. The area has generally voted for Conservative candidates, though it was won by Labour in their 1997 and 2001 landslides.

== Members of Parliament ==
Election	Member	Party
1997	Gareth Thomas	Labour
2005	David Jones	Conservative
2024	Constituency abolished	

== Elections ==
=== Elections in the 1990s ===
General election 1997: Clwyd West
Party	Candidate	Votes	%	±%
Labour	Gareth Thomas	14,918	37.1	N/A
Conservative	Rod Richards	13,070	32.5	N/A
Plaid Cymru	Eryl W. Williams	5,421	13.5	N/A
Liberal Democrats	Gwyn Williams	5,151	12.8	N/A
Referendum	Heather Bennett-Collins	1,114	2.8	N/A
Conservatory	David K. Neal	583	1.3	N/A
Majority		1,848	4.6	N/A
Turnout		40,257	75.3	N/A
Registered electors		53,467		
Labour win (new seat)				

=== Elections in the 2000s ===
General election 2001: Clwyd West
Party	Candidate	Votes	%	±%
Labour	Gareth Thomas	13,426	38.8	+1.7
Conservative	Jimmy James	12,311	35.6	+3.1
Plaid Cymru	Elfed Williams	4,453	12.8	−0.7
Liberal Democrats	Robina L. Feeley	3,934	11.4	−1.4
UKIP	Mathew Guest	476	1.4	N/A
Majority		1,115	3.2	−1.4
Turnout		34,600	64.1	−11.2
Registered electors		53,962		
Labour hold		Swing	−0.7	

General election 2005: Clwyd West
Party	Candidate	Votes	%	±%
Conservative	David Jones	12,909	36.2	+0.6
Labour	Gareth Thomas	12,776	35.9	−2.9
Liberal Democrats	Frank Taylor	4,723	13.3	+1.9
Plaid Cymru	Eilian Williams	3,874	10.9	−1.9
UKIP	Warwick Nicholson	512	1.4	±0.0
Independent	Jimmy James	507	1.4	N/A
Socialist Labour	Patrick Keenan	313	0.9	N/A
Rejected ballots		57		
Majority		133	0.3	N/A
Turnout		35,614	62.6	−1.5
Registered electors		55,642		
Conservative gain from Labour		Swing	+1.8	

Of the 57 rejected ballots:

- 27 were either unmarked or it was uncertain who the vote was for.
- 26 voted for more than one candidate.
- 4 had writing or mark by which the voter could be identified.

=== Elections in the 2010s ===
General election 2010: Clwyd West
Party	Candidate	Votes	%	±%
Conservative	David Jones	15,833	41.5	+5.4
Labour	Donna Hutton	9,414	24.7	−11.3
Plaid Cymru	Llyr Gruffydd	5,864	15.4	+4.5
Liberal Democrats	Michele Jones	5,801	15.2	+1.9
UKIP	Warwick Nicholson	864	2.3	+0.8
Christian	David Griffiths	239	0.6	N/A
Independent	Joe Blakesley	96	0.3	N/A
Rejected ballots		67		
Majority		6,419	16.8	+16.4
Turnout		38,111	65.8	+0.7
Registered electors		57,913		
Conservative hold		Swing	+8.4	

Of the 67 rejected ballots:

- 52 were either unmarked or it was uncertain who the vote was for.
- 15 voted for more than one candidate.

General election 2015: Clwyd West
Party	Candidate	Votes	%	±%
Conservative	David Jones	16,463	43.3	+1.8
Labour	Gareth Thomas	9,733	25.6	+0.9
UKIP	Warwick Nicholson	4,988	13.1	+10.8
Plaid Cymru	Marc Jones	4,651	12.2	−3.2
Liberal Democrats	Sarah Lesiter-Burgess	1,387	3.6	−11.6
Socialist Labour	Bob English	612	1.6	N/A
Above and Beyond	Rory Jepson	194	0.6	N/A
Rejected ballots		76		
Majority		6,730	17.7	+0.9
Turnout		38,028	64.8	−1.0
Registered electors		58,644		
Conservative hold		Swing	+0.4	

Of the 76 rejected ballots:

- 54 were either unmarked or it was uncertain who the vote was for.
- 22 voted for more than one candidate.

General election 2017: Clwyd West
Party	Candidate	Votes	%	±%
Conservative	David Jones	19,541	48.1	+4.8
Labour	Gareth Thomas	16,104	39.6	+14.0
Plaid Cymru	Dilwyn Roberts	3,918	9.6	−2.6
Liberal Democrats	Victor Babu	1,091	2.7	−0.9
Rejected ballots		79		
Majority		3,437	8.5	−9.2
Turnout		40,654	69.8	+5.0
Registered electors		58,263		
Conservative hold		Swing	-4.6	

Of the 79 rejected ballots:

- 62 were either unmarked or it was uncertain who the vote was for.
- 15 voted for more than one candidate.
- 2 had want of official mark.

General election 2019: Clwyd West
Party	Candidate	Votes	%	±%
Conservative	David Jones	20,403	50.7	+2.6
Labour	Joanne Thomas	13,656	34.0	−5.6
Plaid Cymru	Elfed Williams	3,907	9.7	+0.1
Liberal Democrats	David Wilkins	2,237	5.6	+2.9
Rejected ballots		147		
Majority		6,747	16.7	+8.2
Turnout		40,203	69.7	−0.1
Registered electors		57,714		
Conservative hold		Swing	+4.2	

Of the 147 rejected ballots:

- 134 were either unmarked or it was uncertain who the vote was for.
- 13 voted for more than one candidate.

== See also ==
- Clwyd West (Senedd constituency)
- List of parliamentary constituencies in Clwyd
- List of parliamentary constituencies in Wales
