= Thelwall (disambiguation) =

Thelwall is a village in Warrington, England.

Thelwall may also refer to:

== People ==
- Algernon Thelwall (1795–1863), English clergyman
- Eubule Thelwall (disambiguation)
- John Thelwall (1764–1834), British writer
- Lumley Thelwall (fl. 1656), Welsh politician
- Simon Thelwall (disambiguation)
- Sydney Thelwall (1834–1922), English clergyman
- Thomas de Thelwall (died 1382), English judge and Crown official
- William Thelwall Thomas (1865–1927), Welsh surgeon

== Other uses ==
- Thelwall Viaduct, on the M6 motorway in England

== See also ==
- Thelwell, a surname
