= Simon Thelwall =

Simon Thelwall may refer to:

- Simon Thelwall (MP died 1659) (1601–1659), English politician, MP for Denbigh, 1640
- Simon Thelwall (MP died 1586) (1525/26–1586), MP for Denbigh Boroughs and Denbighshire, 1553 et seq
- Simon Thelwall (of Cefn Coch) (1561–?), MP for Denbigh Boroughs, 1593
- Simon Thelwall (MP died 1663) (1580–1663), MP for Denbighshire 1614, High Sheriff of Denbighshire, 1611
