= 1897 East Denbighshire by-election =

UK parliamentary by-election in Wales

The 1897 East Denbighshire by-election was a parliamentary by-election held for the British House of Commons constituency of East Denbighshire in Wales on 28 September 1897.

== Vacancy ==
The by-election was caused by the death of the sitting Liberal MP, George Osborne Morgan.

== Candidates ==
Two candidates were nominated by the Tories and the Liberals.

The Liberal Party nominated Samuel Moss, a barrister.

The Conservative Party nominated George Thomas Kenyon, a barrister and former and future MP for Denbigh Boroughs.

== Result ==
1897 East Denbighshire by-election
Party	Candidate	Votes	%	±%
Liberal	Samuel Moss	5,175	64.5	+3.4
Conservative	George Thomas Kenyon	2,848	35.5	−3.4
Majority		2,327	29.0	+6.8
Turnout		8,023	84.4	+0.9
Registered electors		9,501		
Liberal hold		Swing	+3.4	
