= Hugh Myddelton =

Welsh businessman, civil engineer and politician

Sir Hugh Myddelton, Bt
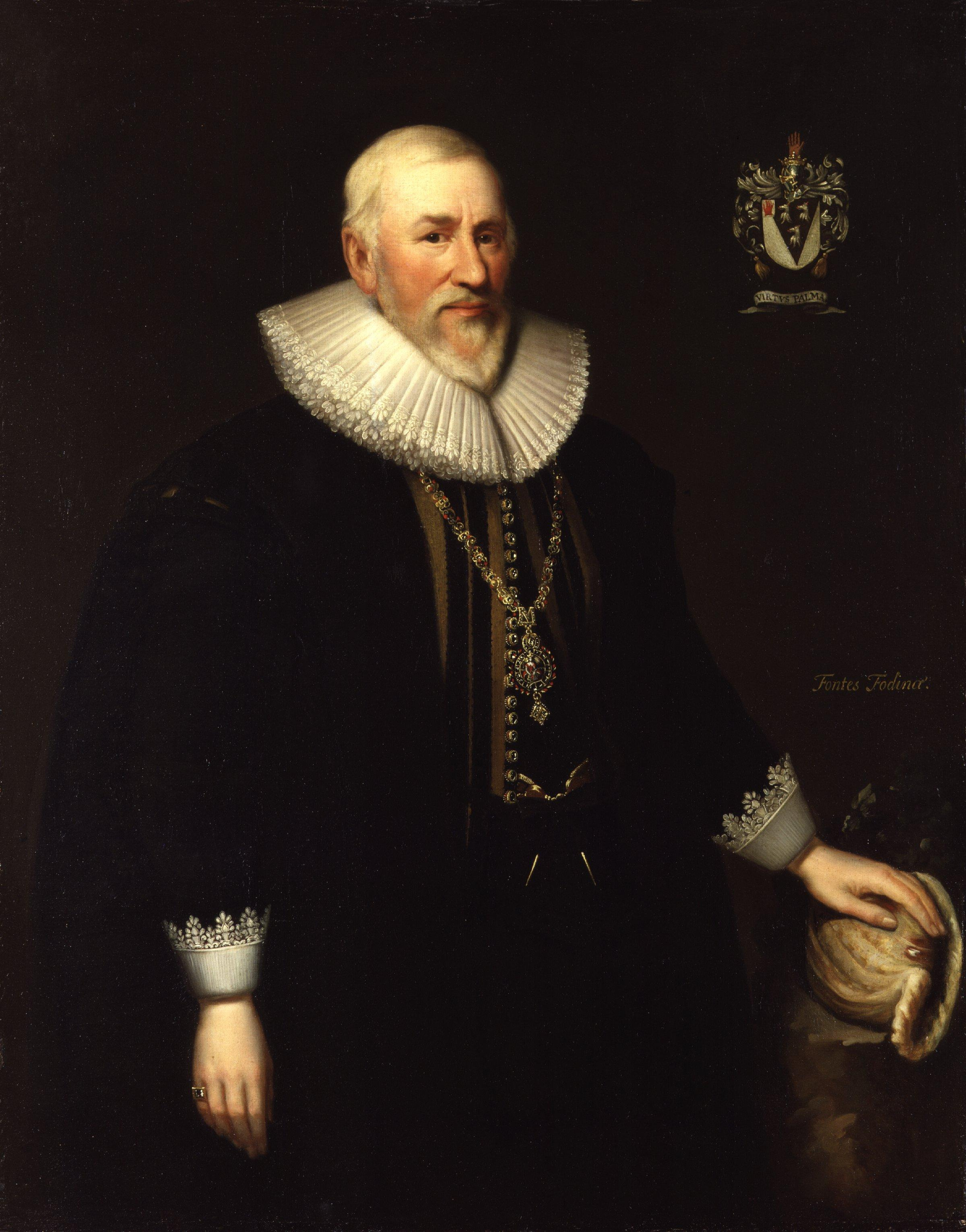
- Portrait of Sir Hugh by Cornelius Johnson

Member of Parliament for Denbigh Boroughs
- In office 1604–1629
- Preceded by: John Panton
- Succeeded by: Parliament suspended until 1640

Personal details
- Born: 1560 Denbighshire, Wales
- Died: 10 December 1631 (aged 71) London, England
- Spouses: Anne Collins Edwards (m. 1585; died 1597) Elizabeth Olmstead (m. 1598)
- Relations: Thomas Myddelton (brother); Robert Myddelton (brother)
- Children: 16
- Parent(s): Richard Myddelton; Jane Dryhurst
- Occupation: Entrepreneur
- Known for: New River

Sir Hugh Myddelton (or Middleton), 1st Baronet (1560 – 10 December 1631) (Note: His date of birth and death vary by source, Britannica has him listed as being born 1559/60 and his death on 19 July 1643.) was a Welsh clothmaker, entrepreneur, mine-owner, goldsmith, banker and self-taught engineer. The spelling of his name is inconsistently reproduced, but Myddelton appears to be the earliest, and most consistently used in place names associated with him.

== Early life ==
Myddelton was born in 1560 at Galch Hill, Denbighshire, Wales. He was the sixth son of Richard Myddelton, governor of Denbigh Castle and MP for Denbigh Boroughs, and Jane Dryhurst, daughter of Hugh Dryhurst and Lucy (née Grimsditch) Dryhurst. Among his brothers were Sir Thomas Myddelton, Lord Mayor of London, William Middelton, poet and seaman, and Robert Myddelton, also an MP.

== Career ==
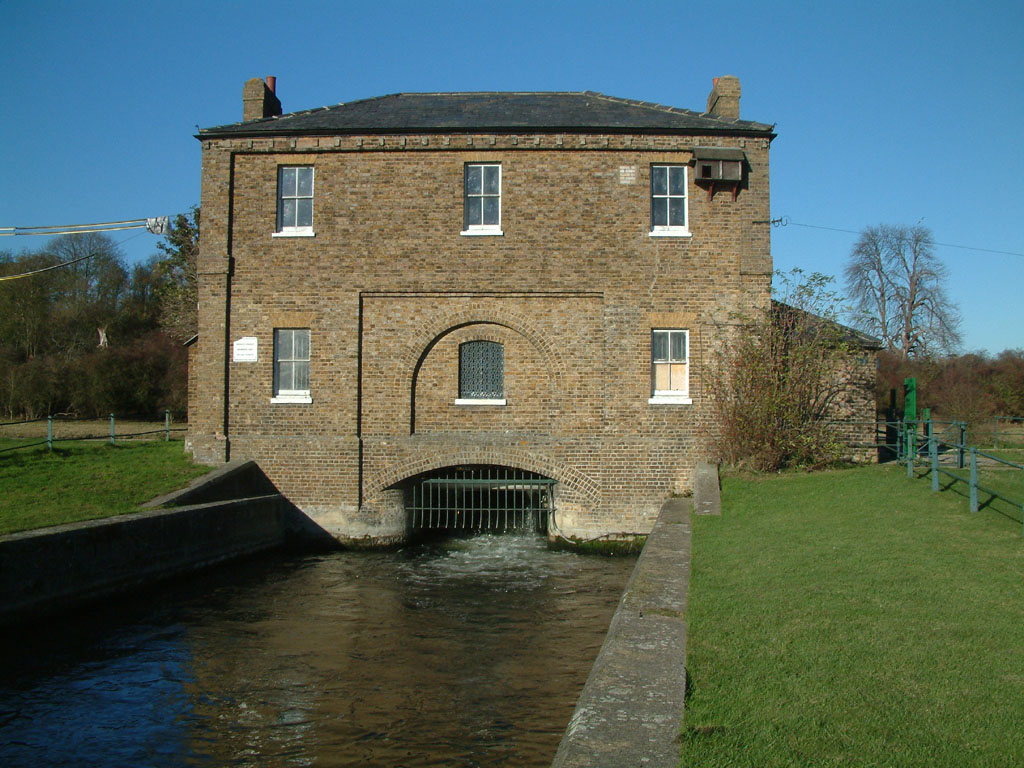
The New Gauge House (1856) which regulates the abstraction of water from the River Lea into the start of the New River in the foreground.

He travelled to seek his fortune in London and after being apprenticed to London goldsmith Thomas Hartopp, becoming so successful in that trade that he was appointed Royal Jeweller by King James I. In the meantime, he became an alderman and then recorder of Denbigh, and in 1603 succeeded his father as MP for Denbigh Boroughs, which he remained until 1628. He also became a very wealthy merchant and clothmaker.

=== New River ===
Myddelton is best remembered as the driving force behind the construction of the New River, an ambitious engineering project to bring clean water into London. After the initial project, started by Edmund Colthurst, encountered financial difficulties, Myddelton helped fund the project through to completion, obtaining the assistance of King James I. The New River was constructed between 1608 and 1613 (being officially opened on 29 September that year), and was originally some 42 miles (68 km) long. It was not initially a financial success, and cost Myddelton substantial sums, although in 1612 he was successful in securing monetary assistance from King James I.

In 1619, the New River Company was incorporated by royal charter, one of the first joint-stock utility companies, with Myddelton as governor. The company would continue to be a powerful and extremely profitable force in London's water supply for nearly 300 years.

=== Mining activities ===
In 1617, Myddelton obtained large profits from lead and silver mines at Bronfloydd, Cwmerfyn and Cwmsymlog in Cardiganshire, Wales. Working those mines involved building aqueducts to serve the stamp mills needed to crush the ore. Following engineering works at Brading on the Isle of Wight, he was created a baronet on 22 October 1622.

== Personal life ==
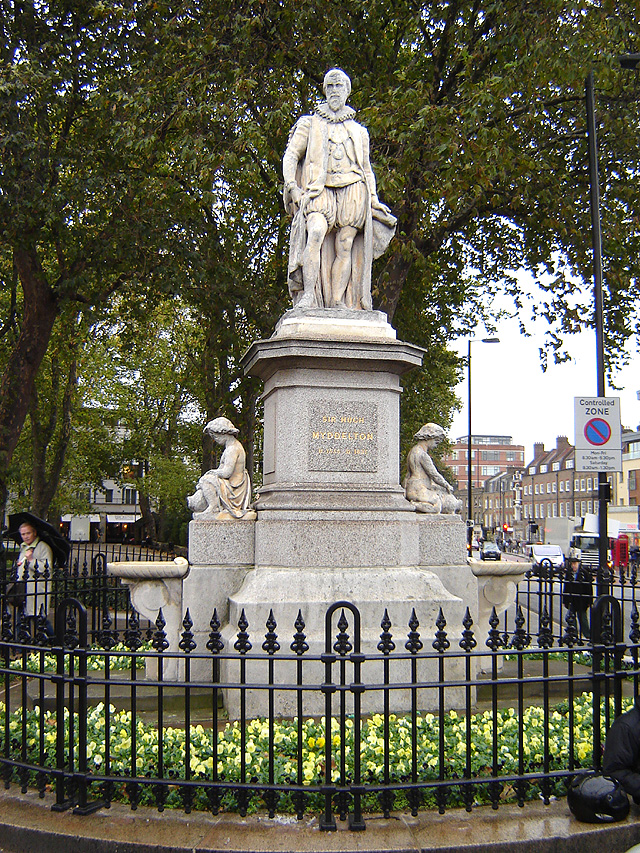
Statue of Sir Hugh Myddelton by John Thomas, on Islington Green previously known as Paradise Row near the terminus of the New River. Unveiled 1862 by William Gladstone, then Chancellor of the Exchequer and soon to become Prime Minister.

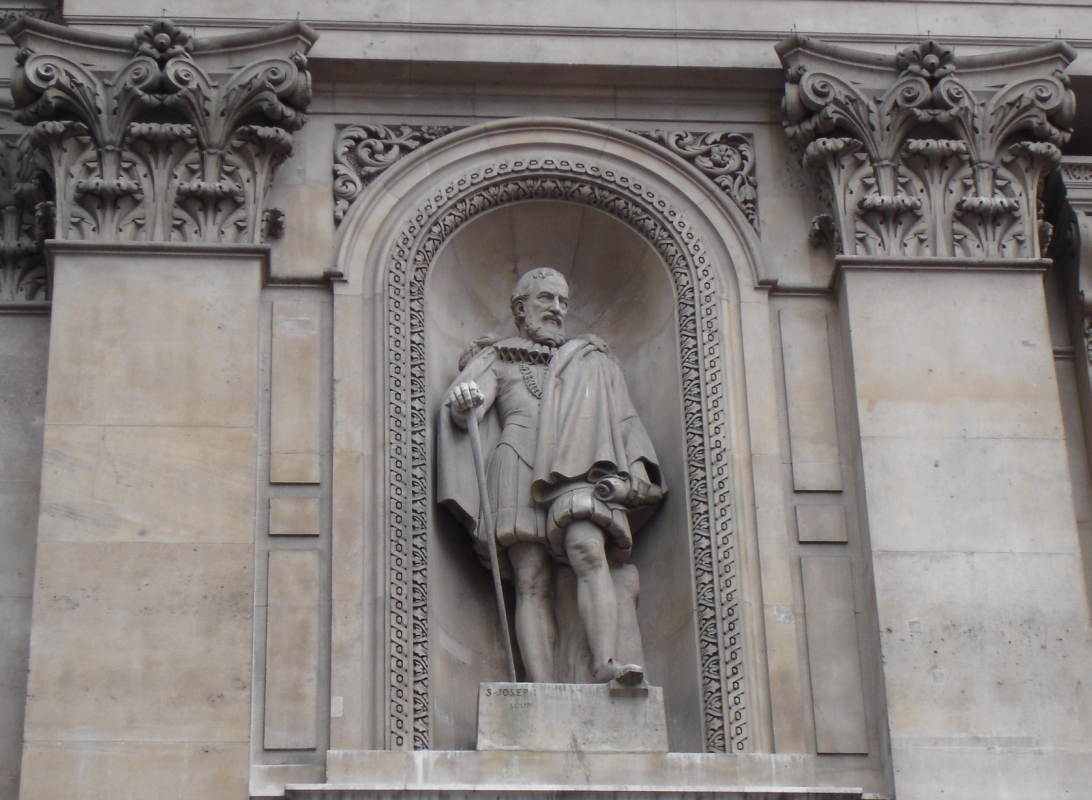
Statue of Sir Hugh Myddelton on the Royal Exchange, London

Myddelton was twice married. His first wife was Anne (née Collins) Edwards, whom he married shortly before 5 November 1585. Anne, a widow of Richard Edwards of London, was a daughter of Collins of Lichfield, Staffordshire. After Anne's death in 1597, he married Elizabeth Olmstead, daughter and heiress of John Olmstead of Ingatestone, Essex, in 1598. Myddelton's second marriage was presumably arranged by his brother, Sir Thomas, the bride's stepfather. Between his two wives, he had ten sons and six daughters, including William Middleton (1603–c. 1652), who served as MP for Denbigh from 1630 and 1647.

He died in December 1631 at Bush Hill, London, and was buried in the church of St. Matthew Friday Street. He was succeeded in the baronetcy by his son William. His widow died on 19 July 1643.

== Memorials ==
There is a statue of Myddelton on Islington Green. Myddleton is also depicted in a statue situated in a niche of the northeastern step-building of the Holborn Viaduct. On an island in the New River at Great Amwell a stone memorial is dedicated to Myddelton. A blue plaque marks the site of his former residence at the end of Cunard Crescent in Enfield.

In Clerkenwell, not far from the original southern end of the New River, Myddelton Square takes its name from him, as do Myddelton Passage and Myddleton Street. Institutions nearby (some closed) that are named after him include Hugh Myddelton Primary School in Myddelton Street; the Myddelton Wing of the LSE Rosebery Hall of Residence, also on Myddelton Street; Hugh Myddelton Secondary school (which closed in the mid-1960s in Sans Walk, Islington); and Myddelton House on Pentonville Road, central office of Citizens Advice.

Bounded by the former course along the valley of Turkey Brook, Myddelton House at Bulls Cross, Enfield (now the headquarters of the Lee Valley Regional Park Authority) was also named in his honour; it was built by Henry Carrington Bowles (formerly a print and map maker of St Paul's Churchyard) whose wife, Anne Garnault, was a member of a Huguenot family with a controlling interest in the New River Company. There is also a Myddleton Arms on New North Road in Canonbury, curiously with that spelling.

Myddelton Avenue in Finsbury Park, parallel to Brownswood Road and the site of one of the New River Reservoirs, also is named for him. At the northern end of the New River, Myddleton Road in Ware is situated close to the source of the river. Myddelton Road in Bowes Park crosses the New River at a point where it goes underground between there and the Hornsey water treatment works, where there is another Myddelton Road off Hornsey High Street.

== Sources ==
- Chisholm, Hugh, ed. (1911). "Myddelton, Sir Hugh" . Encyclopædia Britannica. Vol. 19 (11th ed.). Cambridge University Press. pp. 110–111.
- Goodwin, Gordon (1894). "Myddelton, Hugh" . In Lee, Sidney (ed.). Dictionary of National Biography. Vol. 39. London: Smith, Elder & Co.
- Jenner, Mark S. R. (2008) [2004]. "Myddelton, Sir Hugh, baronet (1556x60?–1631)". Oxford Dictionary of National Biography (online ed.). Oxford University Press. doi:10.1093/ref:odnb/19683. (Subscription, Wikipedia Library access or UK public library membership required.)

Parliament of England
Preceded by John Panton	Member of Parliament for Denbigh Boroughs; 1604–1629	Parliament suspended until 1640
Baronetage of England
New title	Baronet (of Ruthin); 1622–1631	Succeeded by William Middleton
