= Eubule =

Eubule may refer to:

- In Greek mythology (Εὐβούλη):
  - Eubule, one of the Danaïdes, betrothed to Demarchus
  - Eubule, one of the three daughters of Leos
- Eubule, a personal name of which bearers include:
  - Eubule Thelwall (disambiguation)
  - Sir Eubule John Waddington, Governor of Northern Rhodesia (1941–1947)
- Eubule (bug), a genus of bugs in the family Coreidae
