= 1912 North West Norfolk by-election =

UK parliamentary by-election

The 1912 North West Norfolk by-election was a Parliamentary by-election held on 31 May 1912. The constituency returned one Member of Parliament (MP) to the House of Commons of the United Kingdom, elected by the first past the post voting system.

== Vacancy ==
The vacancy was caused by the death of the sitting member, Sir George White, on 11 May 1912 at the age of 72. He had been the MP there since 1900.

== Electoral history ==
The constituency was a safe Liberal seat, which they had won at every election since its creation in 1885. The result at the last general election was clear cut;

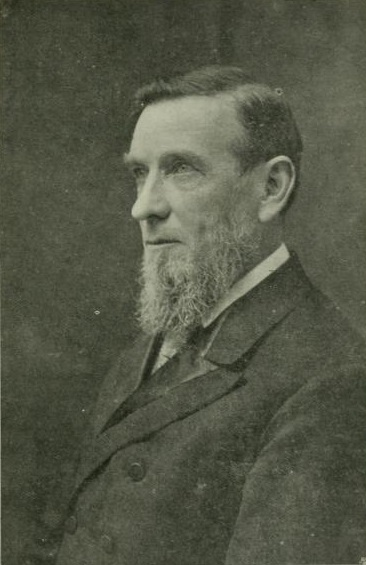
George White

General election December 1910: North West Norfolk
Party	Candidate	Votes	%	±%
Liberal	George White	5,407	55.9	−0.1
Conservative	Neville Jodrell	4,264	44.1	+0.1
Majority		1,143	11.8	−0.2
Turnout		9,671	83.3	−2.7
Liberal hold		Swing	-0.1	

== Candidates ==
- The Liberal Party selected 41-year-old Edward Hemmerde to defend the seat. He was a barrister who had been appointed Recorder of Liverpool in 1909. He had sat as Liberal MP for East Denbighshire from 1906 to December 1910, when he left to contest the Conservative seat of Portsmouth but was defeated.
- The Conservatives re-selected 54-year-old Neville Jodrell, who had been their candidate in both 1910 general elections.

== Campaign ==
Hemmerde was a fanatical advocate of a Single tax system, based on a Land Value tax, and he made this issue the centre of his campaign. He argued that a Land Value tax meant "raising wages and solving the rural housing problem". He endorsed the programme of the National Agricultural Labourers and Rural Workers Union, which called for Trade Boards to set agricultural wages. A Land Value tax was not Liberal Party policy, but Liberal Chancellor of the Exchequer David Lloyd George, sent Hemmerde a message of support in which he agreed to "a thorough reorganization of the land system".

== Result ==
The Liberals held the seat, with only a small swing away from them:

Edward Hemmerde

By-Election 31 May 1912: North West Norfolk
Party	Candidate	Votes	%	±%
Liberal	Edward Hemmerde	5,613	53.1	−2.8
Conservative	Neville Jodrell	4,965	46.9	+2.8
Majority		648	6.2	−5.6
Turnout		10,578	87.7	+4.4
Liberal hold		Swing	-2.8	

== Aftermath ==
The result brought the issue of Land Value taxation to the fore of Liberal government thinking. Lloyd George sat down with Hemmerde and the Single Taxers to devise new land policies to present to the electors at the next general election.

A general election was due to take place by the end of 1915. By the autumn of 1914, the following candidates had been adopted to contest that election. However, due to the outbreak of World War I, the election did not take place.

General Election 1914/15: North West Norfolk
Party	Candidate	Votes	%	±%
Liberal	Edward Hemmerde			
Unionist	Neville Jodrell			

Boundary changes resulted in the constituency being abolished and merged into King's Lynn. Hemmerde was promised government endorsement, but was denied the coalition coupon and decided not to contest the 1918 general election. This meant that the Liberal Party lost the seat by close of nominations.

1918 United Kingdom general election: King's Lynn
Party	Candidate	Votes	%	±%
Unionist	*Neville Jodrell	10,146	50.9	
Labour	Robert Barrie Walker	9,780	49.1	New
Majority		366	1.8	N/A
Turnout		19,926		
Unionist gain from Liberal		Swing		

- endorsed candidate of the Coalition Government.
