= John Panton (disambiguation) =

John Panton was a Scottish golfer.

John Panton may also refer to:

- John Panton (MP), Welsh politician
- John Panton (Australian politician), merchant and politician in New South Wales and Queensland, Australia
