= 1906 East Denbighshire by-election =

UK Parliamentary by-election

← 1906	14 August 1906	1909 →

Candidate	Hemmerde	Boscawen
Party	Liberal	Conservative
Popular vote	5,917	3,126
Percentage	65.4%	34.6%
MP before election
Samuel Moss
Liberal
Subsequent MP
Edward Hemmerde
Liberal

The 1906 East Denbighshire by-election was held on 14 August 1906. The by-election was held due to the resignation of the incumbent Liberal MP, Samuel Moss, in order to become a county court judge. It was won by the Liberal candidate Edward Hemmerde.

1906 East Denbighshire by-election
Party	Candidate	Votes	%	±%
Liberal	Edward Hemmerde	5,917	65.4	N/A
Conservative	Arthur Griffith-Boscawen	3,126	34.6	N/A
Majority		2,791	30.8	N/A
Turnout		9,043	80.9	N/A
Registered electors		11,172		
Liberal hold		Swing	N/A	
