= Celtic Congress =

Celtic cultural organisation

- A' Chòmhdhail Cheilteach (Scottish Gaelic); An Chomhdháil Cheilteach (Irish); Yn Cohaglym Celtiagh (Manx); Y Gyngres Geltaidd (Welsh); An Guntelles Keltek (Cornish); Ar C'hendalc'h Keltiek (Breton)
- Formation: 1917
- Official languages: Breton; Cornish; English; Irish; Manx; Scottish Gaelic; Welsh
- International President: Yann Guillamot
- International Secretary: Denise Chubb
- Website: internationalcelticcongress.org/en/

The International Celtic Congress (Breton: Ar C'hendalc'h Keltiek, Cornish: An Guntelles Keltek, Manx: Yn Cohaglym Celtiagh, Scottish Gaelic: A' Chòmhdhail Cheilteach, Irish: An Chomhdháil Cheilteach, Welsh: Y Gyngres Geltaidd) is a cultural organisation that seeks to promote the Celtic languages of Ireland, Scotland, Wales, Brittany, Cornwall and the Isle of Man. The International Celtic Congress is a non-political charitable organisation and its stated object is to "... perpetuate the culture, ideals, and languages of the Celtic peoples, and to maintain an intellectual contact and close cooperation between the respective Celtic communities."

The Celtic Congress should not be confused with the Celtic League which also focuses on political matters, although the two organisations share a number of objectives. Like the Celtic League, it tries to "hold... an annual international congress in one of the six Celtic countries, if possible according to a fixed rotation". The Celtic League itself, split off the Celtic Congress amicably, to pursue political aims, and many people are members of both.

There is an International Celtic Congress each year in one of the Celtic countries. The 2020 Congress, initially planned for Aberystwyth, Wales was cancelled in March 2020 due to the coronavirus pandemic. The 2021 Congress, also planned for Aberystwyth, was hosted online.

== Background ==
Following a meeting at the National Eisteddfod of Wales in 1900, the first Pan-Celtic Congress was held in Dublin in 1901, at that time it was proposed to make the Congress a triennial event. In 1904 Cornwall became a member of the Pan-Celtic Congress.

== History ==
The Celtic Congress was founded in 1917 by Edward John, a Welsh nationalist who was an MP for East Denbighshire from 1910 until 1918. He was motivated in part by the ideal of reviving the work of the earlier Celtic Association and its annual Pan-Celtic Congresses, but was also influenced by the social and culture aftermath of the First World War. The new Celtic Congress held its first meeting in 1917 at the Birkenhead Eisteddfod. The Congress was held in Edinburgh in 1920, and in 1921 on the Isle of Man. In 1925 the Congress was held in Dublin, where one of the speakers was Douglas Hyde. A prominent figure was Agnes O'Farrelly, who was also part of the Gaelic League and for a while was a member of Cumann na mBan. She played a major role in the organisation after John's death in 1931.

In 1935, Cardiff was the venue, and BBC Western Region broadcast the proceedings. The 1938 Congress was held on Isle of Man in different halls, so that attendees had a choice of lectures, debates and discussions. Meetings were irregular before World War II although in the 1920s, the National Party of Scotland (the forerunner of the modern Scottish National Party) sought involvement, and the then Taoiseach of Ireland, Éamon de Valera consented to be a patron of the organisation in the 1930s.

There had been an eleven-year gap before the August 1949 Celtic Congress at Bangor, Wales where delegates included Sir Ifor Williams and Conor Maguire, Chief Justice of Ireland. Meetings have been held almost every year since then. The Celtic Congress of 1950, held at the Royal Institution of Cornwall in Truro, was a catalyst for the foundation of Mebyon Kernow the following year. The Wales branch hosted the meeting at Aberystwyth in 1960.

Each of the six branches is independent with their own programmes of activities during the year. The Conference is held in each of the six countries in turn, and the country that is hosting the conference has the privilege of choosing the theme of the lectures for that year. An International Celtic Congress involves lectures, visits to places of cultural and historic interest, and music and dance events.

== See also ==
- Celtic nations
- Celtic League (political organisation)
- Pan-Celticism
- Celtic languages
- Eisteddfod
