= Richard Cavendish =

Richard Cavendish may refer to:

- Richard Cavendish (Denbigh Boroughs MP) (died c. 1601), English courtier and politician
- Lord Richard Cavendish (1752–1781), Member of the Parliament of Great Britain
- Richard Cavendish, 2nd Baron Waterpark (1765–1830), Anglo-Irish politician and peer
- Lord Richard Cavendish (1794–1876), Member of Parliament, member of the Canterbury Association
- Lord Richard Cavendish (1871–1946), British aristocrat, author, magistrate and politician
- Richard Cavendish (occult writer) (1930–2016), British writer on topics dealing with the occult
