= Thelwell =

Thelwell is both a surname and a given name. Notable people with the name include:

Surname:

- Alton Thelwell (born 1980), English footballer
- Kevin Thelwell (born 1973), English football coach
- Lumley Thelwell (fl. 1649–1656), Welsh politician
- Michael Thelwell (born 1939), Jamaican-born American novelist and civil rights activist
- Norman Thelwell (1923–2004), English cartoonist
- Ryan Thelwell (born 1973), Canadian football player

Given name:

- Thelwell Pike (1866–1957), English footballer

== See also ==
- Thelwall
- Thirlwall
