= John Manley (MP) =

English politician

John Manley (c. 1622—1699) was an English politician who sat in the House of Commons at various times between 1659 and 1690. He was Postmaster General during the Commonwealth.

== Life ==
Manley was the son of Cornelius Manley of Erbistock, Denbighshire. He was offered the sum of £8,259 19s.11 3/4d. for farming the Post Office, inland and foreign on 29 June 1653 when it was offered for tender. At Midsummer 1653 he was appointed Postmaster General when he took the farm of the Letter Office at a contract of £10,000. Captain John Manley and his servant were granted a pass to go to Holland on 4 April 1655 under a warrant of the Lord Protector and his Council. The Council of State ordered Secretary John Thurloe to manage the Post Office on 24 April 1655.

Manley was commissioner for assessment for Denbighshire in 1657. In 1659 he was commissioner for assessment for North Wales, captain of the militia of Denbighshire and a justice of the peace for Denbighshire. He was also elected member of parliament for Denbigh Boroughs.

On the Restoration, Manley was at Bryn-y-Ffynon where his strong religious and political views attracted attention. He then became a brewer in London, but his premises were destroyed in the Great Fire of London. He was wealthy enough to serve as Master of the Worshipful Company of Skinners from 1673 to 1674. In 1678, following the death of his wife, he was granted 370 acres in Carolina. He was a major of horse in the army of the Duke of Monmouth in 1685, and escaped to Holland after the defeat of the Rebellion. In 1688 he accompanied William of Orange to England. He was elected MP for Bridport in 1689. In 1690 he was a colonel in the army.

Manley was in a debtors' prison by 1698 and suffering from the dead palsy (a contemporary term for paralysis). He was given a pension of £50 a quarter, but died after he had drawn only three payments. He was buried at St Stephen Walbrook on 31 January 1699.

== Family ==
Manley married Margaret Dorislaus daughter of Isaac Dorislaus, who was murdered at The Hague when Ambassador from the Commonwealth to the States General. His son John Manley was MP for Bossiney and Camelford. His other son Isaac became postmaster-general of Ireland and sat in the Parliament of Ireland. Manley's brother, Sir Francis Manley of Erbistock, was a judge of North Wales.

Parliament of England
Vacant Not represented in Second Protectorate Parliament Title last held by Simon Thelwall	Member of Parliament for Denbigh Boroughs; 1659	Vacant Not represented in Restored Rump Title next held by John Carter
