= John Wynne (1689–1718) =

Welsh politician

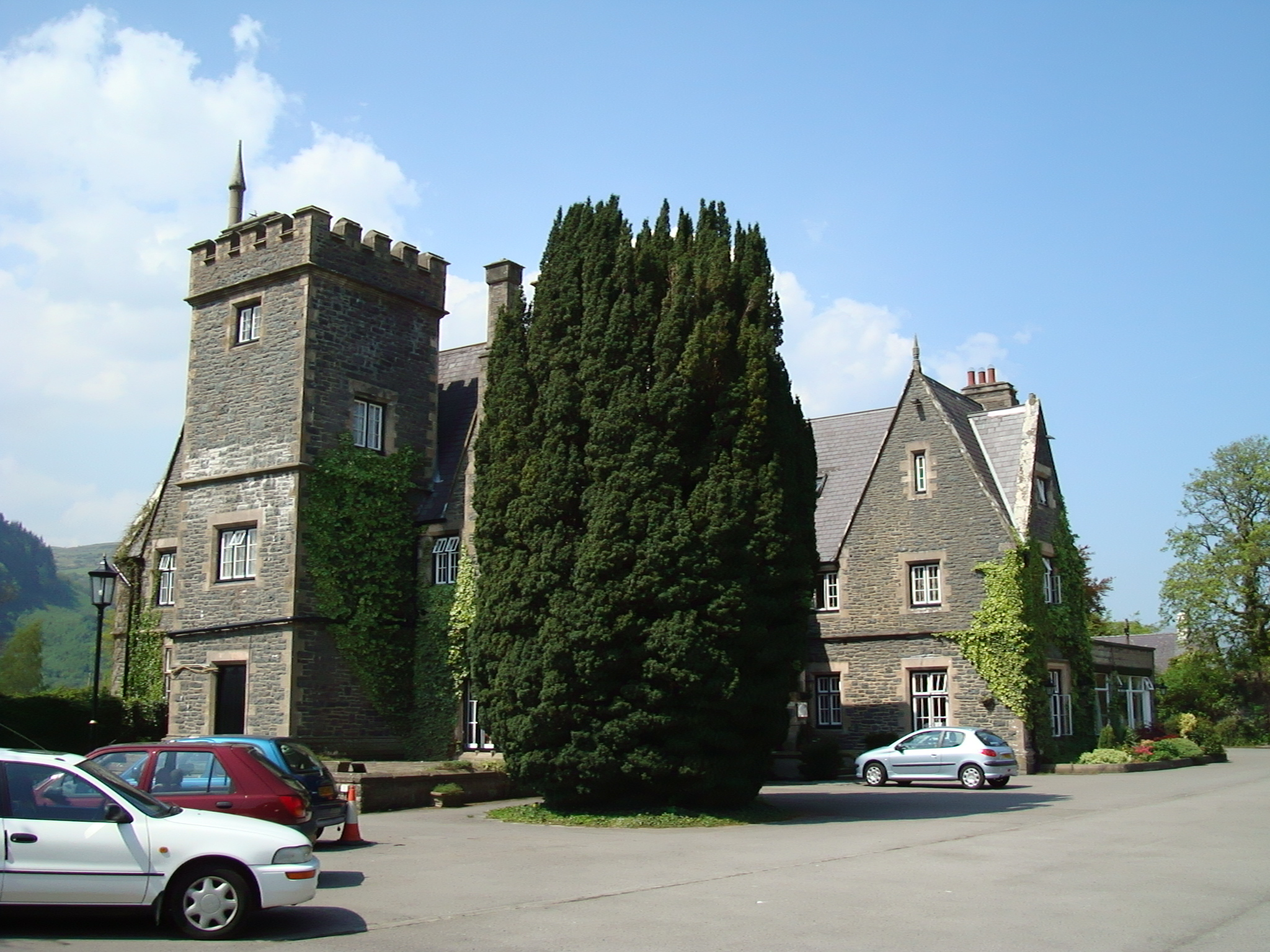
Maenan Abbey, seat of the Wynne family

John Wynne (1689–1718), of Maenan Abbey and Melai, Denbighshire, was a Welsh politician.

He was the only son of William Wynne of Melai and educated at Jesus College, Oxford.

He was a common councilman for Denbigh from 1707 to his death, serving as mayor in 1712 and an alderman in 1715–16, 1717–18. He was pricked High Sheriff of Denbighshire for 1711–12 and was a Member of Parliament (MP) for Denbigh Boroughs from 1713 to 1715.

He married in 1713, Sydney, the daughter of Sir William Williams, 2nd Baronet and left a daughter, Jane, the mother of Thomas Wynn, 1st Baron Newborough and the inheritor of the Maenan Abbey and Melai estates.

Parliament of Great Britain
Preceded by John Roberts	Member of Parliament for Denbigh Boroughs; 1713–1715	Succeeded by John Roberts
