= Eubule Thelwall =

Eubule Thelwall may refer to:

- Eubule Thelwall (politician) (1557–1630), politician and Principal of Jesus College, Oxford 1621–30
- Eubule Thelwall (landowner) (1622–1695), landowner and solicitor who held legal offices in North Wales and Cheshire
- Eubule Thelwall (college principal) (1682–?), Principal of Jesus College, Oxford 1725–27

== See also ==
- Thelwall (disambiguation)
