= Samuel Moss =

British politician

- Moss 1906
- Born: Samuel Moss
- Died: 14 May 1918 (aged 59); Denbighshire
- Occupations: Politician; judge

Samuel Moss MA BCL JP CC MP (13 December 1858 – 14 May 1918), was a Welsh Liberal politician and judge.

== Background ==
Moss was born the second son of Enoch Moss, of Broad Oak, Rossett, North Wales. He attended Worcester College, Oxford. In 1895 he married Eleanor Samuel, daughter of E.B. Samuel of The Darland, Wrexham. They had four sons and two daughters.

== Legal career ==
He qualified as a barrister and practised on North Wales and Chester Circuit. He went to Lincoln's Inn in 1880. He was Assistant Boundary Commissioner for the whole of Wales, 1887. He was County Court Judge, North Wales, Chester District (Circuit No 29), from 1906 to 1918. He also served as a Justice of the Peace for Denbighshire. He wrote The English Land Laws, which was published in 1886.

== Political career ==
He was elected to the House of Commons for Denbighshire East in a by-election in 1897. He held the seat until he resigned shortly after the 1906 election to take up an appointment as a County Court Judge. In local politics he was an Alderman and first vice-chairman of Denbighshire County Council, and 2nd Chairman; formerly member of Chester City Council.

Parliament of the United Kingdom
Preceded by George Osborne Morgan	Member of Parliament for East Denbighshire; 1897 by-election – 1906 by-election	Succeeded by Edward Hemmerde
