= Robert Myddelton (1678–1733) =

British lawyer and politician

Robert Myddleton (1678–1733), of Chirk Castle, Denbighshire, was a British lawyer and politician who sat in the House of Commons from 1722 to 1733.

== Early life ==
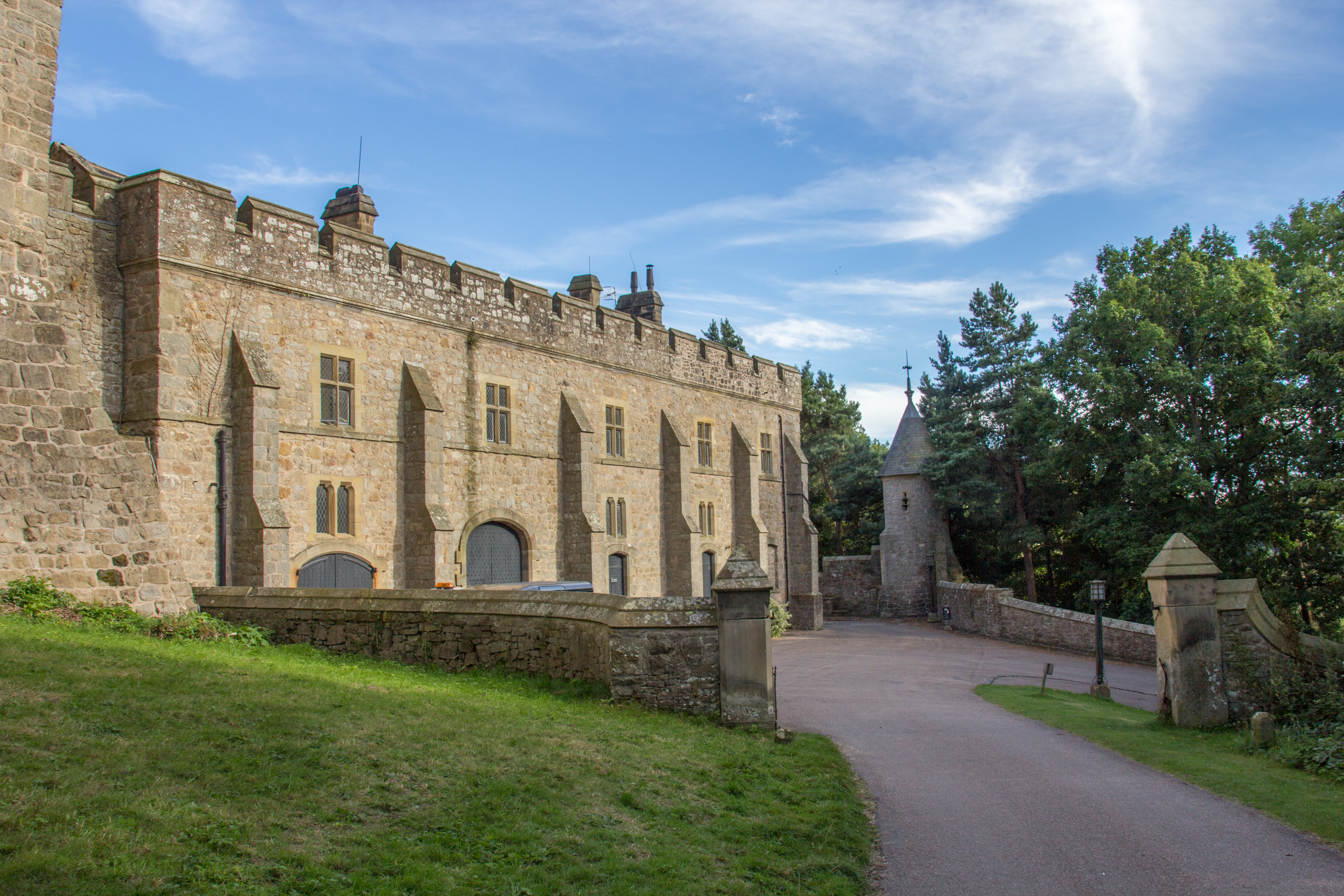
Chirk Castle

Myddleton was baptized on 14 June 1678, the eldest surviving son of Richard Myddelton of Shrewsbury and Crutched Friars, London. He matriculated at Brasenose College, Oxford on 14 December 1694 and was admitted at Middle Temple in 1695. In 1700 he succeeded to the estates of his father and in 1702, he was called to the bar. He married Ann Reade, daughter of Sir James Reade, 2nd Baronet, of Brocket Hall, Hertfordshire on 5 May 1720. He succeeded his cousin, Sir William Myddelton, 4th Baronet, to Chirk Castle on 5 January 1718.

== Career ==
Myddleton was Recorder of, Shrewsbury in 1710. When his uncle Sir Richard Myddelton, Bt died in 1716, he stood for Denbighshire on the Chirk Castle interest at the ensuing by-election on 30 June 1716, but was defeated by Watkin Williams. He was appointed Recorder of Denbigh in 1718. In 1722, having succeeded to the Chirk Castle estate, he stood again for both Denbighshire and Denbigh Boroughs. He asked the Administration to arrange for the Denbighshire election to precede that for Denbigh Boroughs so that if he were defeated for the former he could be returned for the latter. He was defeated for the county but was returned for the boroughs. He voted with the Tories against the Government, even joining his opponent, Watkin Williams Wynn, in opposing a loyal address from the county on the Atterbury plot. He was returned again at the 1727 general election and continued to oppose the Administration.

== Death and legacy ==
Myddleton died without issue on 5 April. 1733. He was succeeded by his brother John Myddelton.

Parliament of Great Britain
Preceded by John Roberts	Member of Parliament for Denbigh Boroughs; 1722–1733	Succeeded by John Myddelton
