= Robert Wrote =

English politician

Robert Wrote (c. 1544 – 25 September 1589), of Bungay, Suffolk, and of Gunton and Tunstall, Norfolk, was an English politician.

He was the son of John Wrote of Bungay, educated at Jesus College, Cambridge and studied law at the Inner Temple in 1561 or 1562.

He was a Member (MP) of the Parliament of England for Beverley in 1584 and Denbigh Boroughs in 1586.

He married Catherine, the daughter and coheiress of Vincent Randall of London and the widow of Thomas Fleet with whom he had two sons and seven daughters.
