= John Turbridge =

Member of the Parliament of England

John Turbridge (fl. 1589), of Dogfeilyn Llanrhudd, Denbighshire, was a Welsh politician.

He was a member (MP) of the parliament of England for Denbigh Boroughs in 1589.
