= Denbigh Boroughs (UK Parliament constituency) =

UK Parliament constituency (1801–1918)

- Former district of Boroughs constituency for the House of Commons
- Preserved county: Denbighshire
- Major settlements: Denbigh, Holt, Ruthin, and Wrexham

1542–1918
- Seats: One
- Replaced by: Denbigh; Wrexham

Denbigh District of Boroughs (variously referred to as Denbigh District, Denbigh Boroughs or just Denbigh) was a parliamentary constituency centred on the town of Denbigh in Wales. It returned one Member of Parliament (MP) to the British House of Commons.

The constituency first returned an MP in 1542, to the English Parliament. From 1707 to 1800, the MPs sat in the Parliament of Great Britain, and after the Act of Union 1800, in the Parliament of the United Kingdom.

The constituency was abolished for the 1918 general election.

== Boundaries ==
From its first known general election in 1542 until 1918, the constituency consisted of a number of boroughs within the historic county of Denbighshire in Wales.

The seat should not be confused with the county constituency of Denbighshire, which existed from the sixteenth century until 1885. The county was divided into East Denbighshire and West Denbighshire between 1885 and 1918.

After 1918 Denbighshire was represented in Parliament by two single member county constituencies, which included all the boroughs formerly in the Denbigh District of Boroughs. One of these was Wrexham, but the other was the Denbigh division of Denbighshire.

=== Denbigh (1535–1832) ===
On the basis of information from several volumes of the History of Parliament, it is apparent that the history of the borough representation from Wales and Monmouthshire is more complicated than that of the English boroughs.

The Laws in Wales Act 1535 (26 Hen. 8. c. 26) provided for a single borough seat for each of 11 of the 12 Welsh counties and Monmouthshire. The legislation was ambiguous as to which communities were enfranchised. The county towns were awarded a seat, but this in some fashion represented all the ancient boroughs of the county as the others were required to contribute to the members wages. It was not clear if the burgesses of the contributing boroughs could take part in the election. The only election under the original scheme was for the 1542 parliament. It seems that only burgesses from the county towns actually took part. The Parliament Act 1543 (35 Hen. 8. c. 11) confirmed that the contributing boroughs could send representatives to take part in the election at the county town. As far as can be told from surviving indentures of returns, the degree to which the out boroughs participated varied, but by the end of the sixteenth century all the seats had some participation from them at some elections at least.

The original scheme was modified by later legislation and decisions of the House of Commons (which were sometimes made with no regard to precedent or evidence: for example in 1728 it was decided that only the freemen of the borough of Montgomery could participate in the election for that seat, thus disenfranchising the freemen of Llanidloes, Welshpool and Llanfyllin).

In the case of Denbighshire, the county town was Denbigh. The out boroughs were Chirk, Holt, and Ruthin. At some point, between 1603 and 1690, Chirk ceased to participate.

In 1690–1790 the freemen of the three remaining boroughs were entitled to vote. There were about 1,400 electors in 1715 (including non-resident freemen). This number was reduced to about 400 after 1744, when only resident freemen were allowed to vote. The electorate increased to about 500 in the 1754–1790 period.

=== Denbigh Boroughs (1832–1918) ===
This was a district of boroughs constituency, which grouped a number of parliamentary boroughs in Denbighshire into one single member constituency. The voters from each participating borough cast ballots, which were added together over the whole district to decide the result of the poll. The enfranchised communities in this district, from 1832, were the four boroughs of Denbigh, Holt, Ruthin, and Wrexham.

The exact boundaries of the parliamentary boroughs in the district were altered by the Parliamentary Boundaries Act 1868, but the general nature of the constituency was unchanged. There were no further boundary changes in the 1885 redistribution of parliamentary seats.

=== After 1918 ===
In the redistribution of seats which took place at the 1918, the Denbigh Boroughs constituency was abolished, along with the two county divisions of East Denbighshire and West Denbighshire. They were replaced by a new county division called Denbigh, which comprised the whole of the county, except for the Municipal Borough of Wrexham and part of the Chirk Rural District which formed the Wrexham division.

The local authorities in the Denbigh division were the Municipal Boroughs of Denbigh and Ruthin; the Urban Districts of Abergele and Pensarn, Colwyn Bay and Colwyn, Llangollen, and Llanrwst; as well as the Rural Districts of Llangollen, Llanrwst, Llansillin, Ruthin, St Asaph (Denbigh), Uwchaled, part of Chirk, and the part of Glan Conway not in Caernarvonshire.

== Members of Parliament ==
=== MPs 1542–1660 ===
As there were sometimes significant gaps between Parliaments held in this period, the dates of first assembly and dissolution are given. Where the name of the member has not yet been ascertained or is not recorded in a surviving document, the entry unknown is entered in the table.

Elected	Assembled	Dissolved	Member	Note
1542	16 January 1542	28 March 1544	Richard Myddelton	
1545	23 November 1545	31 January 1547	George Salusbury	
1547	4 November 1547	15 April 1552	Robert Myddelton	
1553	1 March 1553	31 March 1553	Simon Thelwall	
1553	5 October 1553	5 December 1553	Simon Thelwall	
1554	2 April 1554	3 May 1554	John Salesbury	
1554	12 November 1554	16 January 1555	Fulk Lloyd	
1555	21 October 1555	9 December 1555	John Evans	
1558	20 January 1558	17 November 1558	John Salesbury	
1559	23 January 1559	8 May 1559	Simon Thelwall I	
1562 or 1563	11 January 1563	2 January 1567	Humphrey Llwyd	
1571	2 April 1571	29 May 1571	Simon Thelwall I	
1572	8 May 1572	19 April 1583	Richard Cavendish	
1584	23 November 1584	14 September 1585	Richard Cavendish	
1586	13 October 1586	23 March 1587	Robert Wrote	
1588	4 February 1589	29 March 1589	John Turbridge	
1593	18 February 1593	10 April 1593	Simon Thelwall II	
1597	24 October 1597	9 February 1598	John Panton	
1601	27 October 1601	19 December 1601	John Panton	
1604	19 March 1604	9 February 1611	Hugh Myddleton	
1614	5 April 1614	7 June 1614	Hugh Myddleton	
1620	16 January 1621	8 February 1622	Hugh Myddleton	
1624	12 February 1624	27 March 1625	Hugh Myddleton	
1625	17 May 1625	12 August 1625	Hugh Myddleton	
1626	6 February 1626	15 June 1626	Hugh Myddleton	
1628	17 March 1628	10 March 1629	Hugh Myddleton	
1640	13 April 1640	5 May 1640	John Salusbury	Short Parliament
1640	3 November 1640	5 December 1648	Simon Thelwall	Long Parliament
...	6 December 1648	20 April 1653	Simon Thelwall	Rump Parliament
...	4 July 1653	12 December 1653	unrepresented	Barebones Parliament
1654	3 September 1654	22 January 1655	unrepresented	First Protectorate Parliament
1656	17 September 1656	4 February 1658	unrepresented	Second Protectorate Parliament
1658–59	27 January 1659	22 April 1659	John Manley	Third Protectorate Parliament
...	7 May 1659	20 February 1660	unknown	Rump Parliament restored
...	21 February 1660	16 March 1660	unknown	Long Parliament restored

=== MPs 1660–1918 ===
Year	Member	Party
1660	John Carter	
1661	Sir John Salusbury	
1685	Sir John Trevor	
1689	Edward Brereton	
1705	William Robinson	
1708	Sir William Williams, Bt.	Tory
1710	John Roberts	
1713	John Wynne	
1715	John Roberts	
1722	Robert Myddelton	Tory
1733	John Myddelton	Tory
1741	John Wynn	Whig
1747	Richard Myddelton	
1788	Richard Myddelton	
1797	Thomas Jones	
1802	Hon. Frederick West	
1806	Robert Myddelton Biddulph	
1812	Viscount Kirkwall	Tory
1818	John Wynne Griffith	Whig
1826	Frederick Richard West	Tory
1830	Robert Myddleton-Biddulph	Whig
1832	John Edward Madocks	Whig
1835	Wilson Jones	Conservative
1841	Townshend Mainwaring	Conservative
1847	Frederick Richard West	Conservative
1857	Townshend Mainwaring	Conservative
1868	Watkin Williams	Liberal
1880	Sir Robert Cunliffe, Bt	Liberal
1885	Hon. George Thomas Kenyon	Conservative
1895	William Tudor Howell	Conservative
1900	Hon. George Thomas Kenyon	Conservative
1906	Clement Edwards	Liberal
1910	Hon. William Ormsby-Gore	Conservative
1918	constituency abolished. See Denbigh and Wrexham	

== Elections ==
=== Elections in the 1830s ===
General election 1830: Denbigh Boroughs
Party	Candidate	Votes	%
Whig	Robert Myddelton Biddulph	Unopposed	
Registered electors		c. 817	
Whig gain from Tory			

General election 1831: Denbigh Boroughs
Party	Candidate	Votes	%
Whig	Robert Myddelton Biddulph	Unopposed	
Registered electors		c. 817	
Whig hold			

General election 1832: Denbigh Boroughs
Party	Candidate	Votes	%
Whig	John Edward Maddocks	Unopposed	
Registered electors		1,131	
Whig hold			

General election 1835: Denbigh Boroughs
Party	Candidate	Votes	%
Conservative	Wilson Jones (MP)	490	66.9
Whig	John Edward Maddocks	242	33.1
Majority		248	33.8
Turnout		732	74.2
Registered electors		987	
Conservative gain from Whig			

General election 1837: Denbigh Boroughs
Party	Candidate	Votes	%	±%
Conservative	Wilson Jones (MP)	411	54.9	−12.0
Whig	Robert Myddelton Biddulph	338	45.1	+12.0
Majority		73	9.8	−24.0
Turnout		749	82.4	+8.2
Registered electors		909		
Conservative hold		Swing	−12.0	

=== Elections in the 1840s ===
General election 1841: Denbigh Boroughs
Party	Candidate	Votes	%	±%
Conservative	Townshend Mainwaring	365	54.2	−0.7
Whig	Robert Myddelton Biddulph	309	45.8	+0.7
Majority		56	8.4	−1.4
Turnout		674	71.4	−11.0
Registered electors		944		
Conservative hold		Swing	−0.7	

General election 1847: Denbigh Boroughs
Party	Candidate	Votes	%	±%
Conservative	Frederick Richard West	Unopposed		
Registered electors		841		
Conservative hold				

=== Elections in the 1850s ===
General election 1852: Denbigh Boroughs
Party	Candidate	Votes	%	±%
Conservative	Frederick Richard West	362	55.7	N/A
Radical	William Langford Foulkes	288	44.3	New
Majority		74	11.4	N/A
Turnout		650	75.8	N/A
Registered electors		858		
Conservative hold		Swing	N/A	

General election 1857: Denbigh Boroughs
Party	Candidate	Votes	%	±%
Conservative	Townshend Mainwaring	364	54.7	−1.0
Radical	James Maurice	302	45.3	+1.0
Majority		62	9.4	−2.0
Turnout		666	77.4	+1.6
Registered electors		861		
Conservative hold		Swing	−1.0	

General election 1859: Denbigh Boroughs
Party	Candidate	Votes	%	±%
Conservative	Townshend Mainwaring	Unopposed		
Registered electors		852		
Conservative hold				

=== Elections in the 1860s ===
General election 1865: Denbigh Boroughs
Party	Candidate	Votes	%	±%
Conservative	Townshend Mainwaring	Unopposed		
Registered electors		903		
Conservative hold				

General election 1868: Denbigh Boroughs
Party	Candidate	Votes	%	±%
Liberal	Watkin Williams	1,319	58.3	New
Conservative	Townshend Mainwaring	944	41.7	N/A
Majority		375	16.6	N/A
Turnout		2,263	81.3	N/A
Registered electors		2,785		
Liberal gain from Conservative		Swing	N/A	

=== Elections in the 1870s ===
General election 1874: Denbigh Boroughs
Party	Candidate	Votes	%	±%
Liberal	Watkin Williams	1,238	50.6	−7.7
Conservative	George Thomas Kenyon	1,208	49.4	+7.7
Majority		30	1.2	−15.4
Turnout		2,446	85.0	+3.7
Registered electors		2,879		
Liberal hold		Swing	−7.7	

=== Elections in the 1880s ===
General election 1880: Denbigh Boroughs
Party	Candidate	Votes	%	±%
Liberal	Robert Cunliffe	1,424	50.3	−0.3
Conservative	George Thomas Kenyon	1,409	49.7	+0.3
Majority		15	0.6	−0.6
Turnout		2,833	92.3	+7.3
Registered electors		3,071		
Liberal hold		Swing	−0.3	

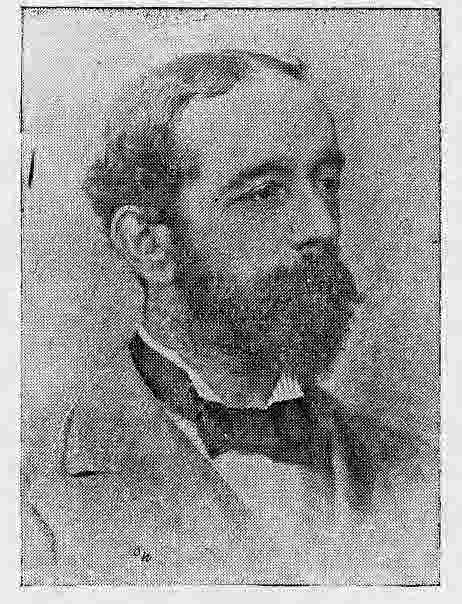
Robert Cunliffe

General election 1885: Denbigh Boroughs
Party	Candidate	Votes	%	±%
Conservative	George Kenyon	1,761	54.8	+5.1
Liberal	Robert Cunliffe	1,455	45.2	−5.1
Majority		306	9.6	N/A
Turnout		3,216	94.2	+1.9
Registered electors		3,414		
Conservative gain from Liberal		Swing	+5.1	

John Barlow

General election 1886: Denbigh Boroughs
Party	Candidate	Votes	%	±%
Conservative	George Kenyon	1,657	53.4	−1.4
Liberal	John Barlow	1,446	46.6	+1.4
Majority		211	6.8	−2.8
Turnout		3,103	90.9	−3.3
Registered electors		3,414		
Conservative hold		Swing	−1.4	

=== Elections in the 1890s ===
General election 1892: Denbigh Boroughs
Party	Candidate	Votes	%	±%
Conservative	George Kenyon	1,664	51.5	−1.9
Liberal	Howell Idris	1,566	48.5	+1.9
Majority		98	3.0	−3.8
Turnout		3,230	91.7	+0.8
Registered electors		3,521		
Conservative hold		Swing	−1.9	

General election 1895: Denbigh Boroughs
Party	Candidate	Votes	%	±%
Conservative	William Tudor Howell	1,833	53.3	+1.8
Liberal	Walter Herbert Morgan	1,604	46.7	−1.8
Majority		229	6.6	+3.6
Turnout		3,437	91.6	−0.1
Registered electors		3,751		
Conservative hold		Swing	+1.8	

=== Elections in the 1900s ===
General election 1900: Denbigh Boroughs
Party	Candidate	Votes	%	±%
Conservative	George Kenyon	1,862	51.5	−1.8
Lib-Lab	Clement Edwards	1,752	48.5	+1.8
Majority		110	3.0	−3.6
Turnout		3,614	87.4	−4.2
Registered electors		4,137		
Conservative hold		Swing	−1.8	

Clem Edwards

General election 1906: Denbigh Boroughs
Party	Candidate	Votes	%	±%
Lib-Lab	Clement Edwards	2,533	56.4	+7.9
Conservative	George Kenyon	1,960	43.6	−7.9
Majority		573	12.8	N/A
Turnout		4,493	94.5	+7.1
Registered electors		4,755		
Lib-Lab gain from Conservative		Swing	+7.9	

=== Elections in the 1910s ===
General election January 1910: Denbigh Boroughs
Party	Candidate	Votes	%	±%
Conservative	William Ormsby-Gore	2,437	50.1	+6.5
Lib-Lab	Clement Edwards	2,427	49.9	−6.5
Majority		10	0.2	N/A
Turnout		4,864	94.8	+0.3
Registered electors		5,130		
Conservative gain from Lib-Lab		Swing	+6.5	

A petition was lodged but was withdrawn after a recount. The original count gave the Conservatives 2,438 votes and the Lib-Lab candidate 2,430 votes.

General election December 1910: Denbigh Boroughs
Party	Candidate	Votes	%	±%
Conservative	William Ormsby-Gore	2,385	50.1	0.0
Liberal	Caradoc Rees	2,376	49.9	0.0
Majority		9	0.2	0.0
Turnout		4,761	92.8	−2.0
Registered electors		5,130		
Conservative hold		Swing	0.0	

== See also ==
- Denbigh (UK Parliament constituency) (from 1918)
- Denbighshire (UK Parliament constituency) (abolished 1885)
- East Denbighshire (UK Parliament constituency) (1885–1918)
- West Denbighshire (UK Parliament constituency) (1885–1918)
