= John Evans (died 1565) =

English politician

John Evans, Ieuans or Jevans (by 1525 – 1565), of Shrewsbury, Shropshire, was an English politician.

He was a member (MP) of the parliament of England for a now-unknown constituency in 1536, Shrewsbury in 1547, Leominster in April 1554, Much Wenlock in November 1554 and Denbigh Boroughs in 1555.
