= Edward John (British politician) =

Welsh politician

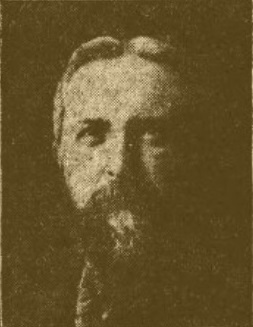
E.T. John

Edward Thomas John (14 March 1857 – 16 February 1931), known as E.T. John, was a radical Welsh Liberal Party politician who later joined the Labour Party.

== Background ==
He was born in Pontypridd on 15 March 1857, the son of John John and Margaret Morgan. He married in 1881, Margaret Rees of Caerwiga Pendoylan, Glamorgan. They had four sons and two daughters.

== Career ==
He was a Welsh Nationalist and Pacifist. He served as Liberal Member of Parliament for East Denbighshire from 1910–18. His Welsh Nationalism dominated his early profile in parliament and he wrote a number of publications; Wales, its notable Sons and Daughters; St. David's Day Addresses Delivered Before the Cleveland and Durham Welsh National Society, 1905–1910 [1911], Home Rule for Wales; Addresses to "young Wales" [1912], Cymru a'r Gymraeg. [1916] and Wales, its Politics and Economics. He made contributions to Welsh Monthlies and Quarterlies; y Beirniad, y Genedl, Wales, The Welsh Outlook, etc. In 1914 his pacifism took centre stage as he opposed Britain's entry into World War One. Along with a number of other pacifist Liberal and Labour MPs he joined the pressure group the Union of Democratic Control in 1914. His East Denbighshire seat disappeared for the 1918 General Election being merged into a new Denbighshire seat. He decided to contest the new seat but under new party colours. He had joined the Labour Party and had their endorsement but did not receive endorsement from the Coalition Government and was defeated by a Liberal who did;

General election 1918 Electorate 30,448
Party	Candidate	Votes	%	±%
Liberal	David Davies	14,773	83.3	
Labour	Edward John	2,958	16.7	
Majority		11,815	66.6	
Turnout			58.2	
Liberal hold		Swing		

He again stood as a Labour candidate for parliament at the 1922 General Election but this time in Brecon and Radnorshire;

General election 1922 Electorate 38,815
Party	Candidate	Votes	%	±%
National Liberal	William Jenkins	20,405	67.4	
Labour	Edward John	9,850	32.6	
Majority		10,555	34.8	
Turnout			77.9	
National Liberal hold		Swing		

He did not contest the General Election of 1923 when Jenkins was returned unopposed, but he contested the 1924 General Election and finished third;

General election 1924 Electorate 39,943
Party	Candidate	Votes	%	±%
Unionist	Walter Hall	12,834	38.4	
Liberal	William Jenkins	10,374	31.1	
Labour	Edward John	10,167	30.5	−2.1
Majority		2,460	7.3	
Turnout				
Unionist gain from Liberal		Swing		

He did not stand for parliament again. He was President of the National Union of Welsh Societies, 1916–26, President of the Celtic Congress, 1918–27 and President of the Peace Society, 1924–27. He was a member of the Honourable Society of Cymrodorion, the Cambrian Archæological Society, the Historical Society of West Wales and the Anglesey Antiquarian Society. He served as a Justice of the Peace for the Borough of Middlesbrough.

== Sources ==
- Who Was Who
- British parliamentary election results 1885–1918, Craig, F. W. S.

Parliament of the United Kingdom
Preceded by Edward Hemmerde	Member of Parliament for East Denbighshire; December 1910 – 1918	constituency abolished
