= John Roberts (Denbigh MP) =

Welsh politician

John Roberts (after 1672 – 4 September 1731) of Llwyn Ynn, Llanfair Dyffryn Clwyd, Denbighshire was a Welsh politician who sat in the House of Commons between 1710 and 1722.

== Early life ==
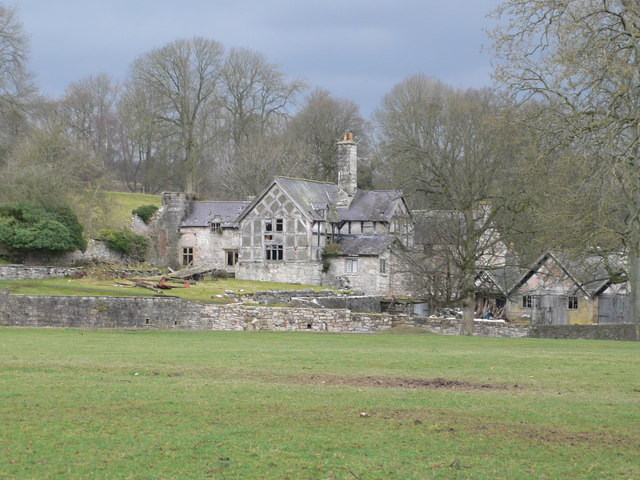
Llwyn Ynn Hall, Llanfair Dyffryn Clwyd, Denbighshire

Roberts was the eldest son and heir of Hugh Roberts of Hafod-y-Bwch, Denbighshire, and his wife Anne Wynn Jones, daughter of Richard Wynn Jones of Plas Newydd at Llanfair Dyffryn Clwyd. Hafod was a small estate situated near Chirk Castle but his mother brought Plas Newydd into the family. He enterered Gray's Inn in 1687. In 1693, he married Susannah Parry, the daughter and later heiress of William Parry of Llwyn Ynn, Denbighshire. By this marriage he acquired Llwyn Ynn, Llanfair Dyffryn Clwyd.

== Career ==
Roberts was appointed High Sheriff of Denbighshire for the year 1705 to 1706. At the 1710 general election, he was returned unopposed as Member of Parliament (MP) for Denbigh Boroughs on the Myddleton interest. He was listed as a Tory and 'Worthy patriot'. At the 1713 general election, he was defeated at Denbigh Boroughs in a contest. He regained his seat at Denbigh Boroughs at the 1715 general election. He was a Tory, and in 1719, voted against the repeal of the Occasional Conformity and Schism Acts and against the Peerage Bill. He was found to have been given stock in the South Sea Company in 1720. At the 1722 general election he had to stand aside at Denbigh for a member of the Myddleton family.

== Family ==
Roberts first wife died on 19 January 1722 and he married secondly Jane Morris, the widow of Morris Jones of Llanrhyadr, Denbighshire and daughter of Sir Walter Bagot, 3rd Baronet, MP, of Blithfield, Staffordshire. He died on 4 September 1731. By his first wife, he had 3 sons who predeceased him and a daughter. He left his estates to his daughter.

Parliament of Great Britain
Preceded by Sir William Williams, Bt.	Member of Parliament for Denbigh Boroughs; 1710–1713	Succeeded by John Wynne
Preceded by John Wynne	Member of Parliament for Denbigh Boroughs; 1715–1722	Succeeded by Robert Myddelton
