= George White (Liberal politician) =

British politician

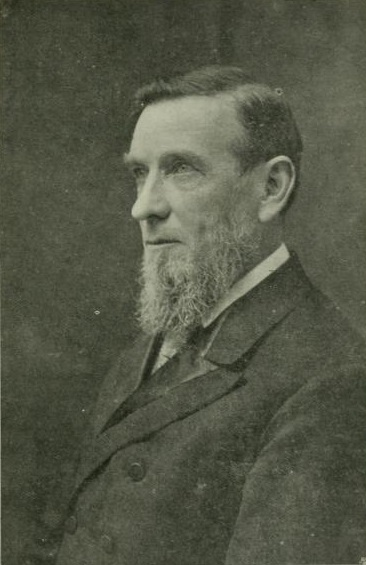

Personal details
- Born: 1840
- Died: 11 May 1912 (aged 71–72)
- Party: Liberal
- Occupation: Politician

Sir George White (1840 – 11 May 1912) was Liberal Party politician in the United Kingdom. He was Member of Parliament (MP) for North West Norfolk from 1900 until his death in 1912, aged 72.

Born in Lincolnshire, he moved to Norwich aged sixteen to take up a clerical post. He worked his way up to become chairman and managing director of Howlett and White, Norwich's largest manufacturer of boots and shoes. He was president of the Baptist Union in 1903. In 1907 he succeeded Robert William Perks as president of the Nonconformist Parliamentary Council.

== Electoral record ==
General election 1900 North West Norfolk
Party	Candidate	Votes	%	±%
Liberal	George White	4,287	52.9	
Liberal Unionist	William Howell Browne Ffolkes	3,811	47.1	
Majority		476	5.8	
Turnout		8,098	74.9	
Liberal hold		Swing		

General election 1906 North West Norfolk
Party	Candidate	Votes	%	±%
Liberal	George White	5,772	66.0	
Conservative	William John Lancaster	2,972	34.0	
Majority		2,800	32.0	
Turnout		8,744	78.8	
Liberal hold		Swing		

General election January 1910 North West Norfolk
Party	Candidate	Votes	%	±%
Liberal	George White	5,596	56.0	
Conservative	Neville Jodrell	4,388	44.0	
Majority		1,208	12.0	
Turnout		9,984	86.0	
Liberal hold		Swing		

General election December 1910: North West Norfolk
Party	Candidate	Votes	%	±%
Liberal	George White	5,407	55.9	−0.1
Conservative	Neville Jodrell	4,264	44.1	+0.1
Majority		1,143	11.8	−0.2
Turnout			83.3	−2.7
Liberal hold		Swing	-0.1	

Parliament of the United Kingdom
Preceded by Joseph Arch	Member of Parliament for North West Norfolk; 1900–1912	Succeeded by Edward Hemmerde
