= Edward Brereton =

Welsh politician

Edward Brereton (c. 1642 – 10 January 1725), of Borras, Denbighshire, was a Welsh politician.

He was a member of parliament (MP) for Denbigh Boroughs in 1689, 1690, 1695, 1698, February 1701, December 1701 and 1702.

Parliament of England
Preceded by Sir John Trevor	Member of Parliament for Denbigh Boroughs; 1689–1705	Succeeded by William Robinson
