= John Myddelton =

Welsh landowner and politician

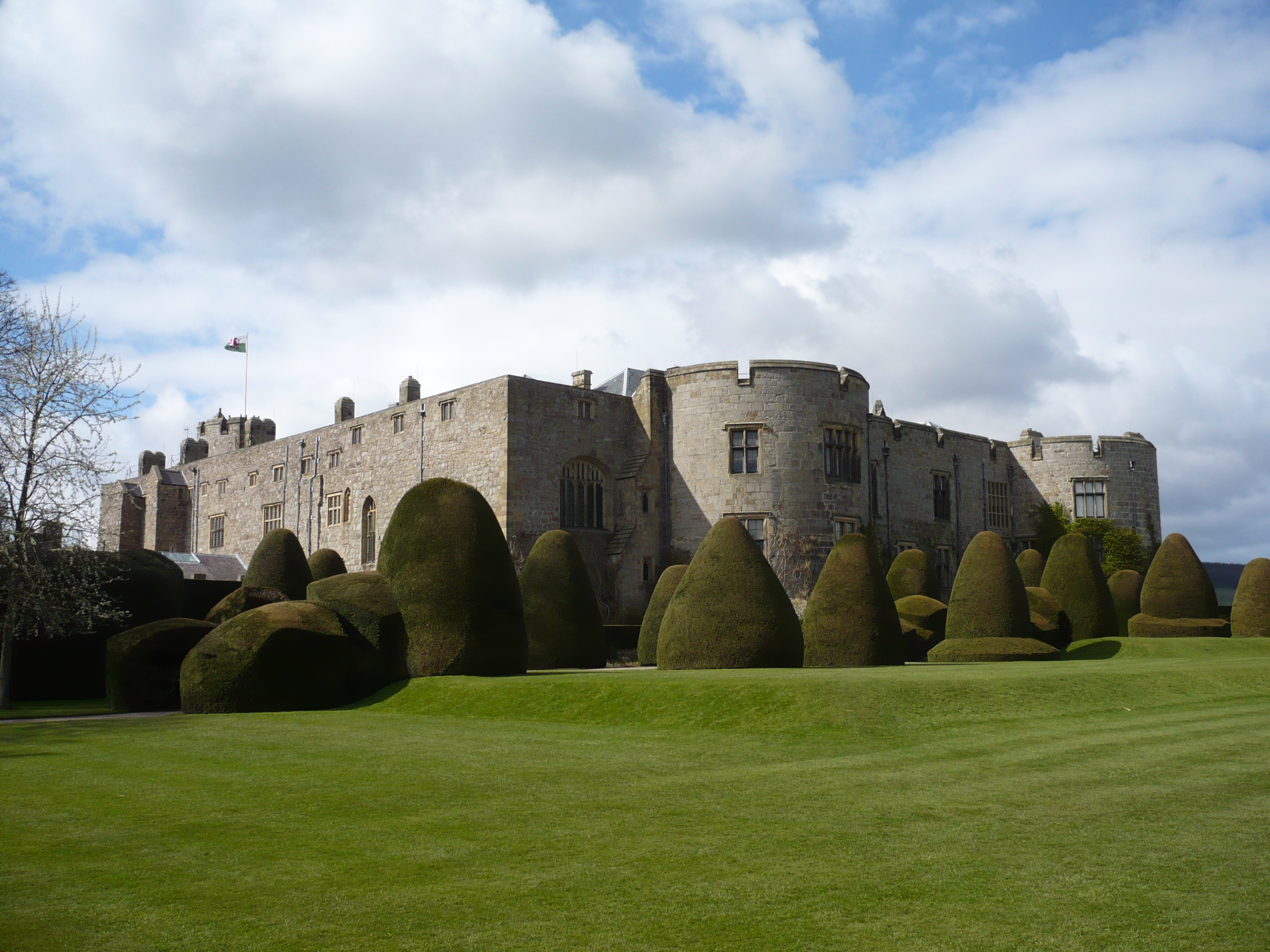
Chirk Castle

John Myddelton (1685 – 9 April 1747), of Chirk Castle, Denbighshire, was a Welsh landowner and politician.

He was born the younger son of Richard Myddelton of Shrewsbury and inherited his father's estates, including Chirk Castle, when his elder brother Robert died in 1733.

He was elected Member of Parliament (MP) of the Parliament of Great Britain for Denbigh Boroughs on 27 April 1733 – 1741 and Denbighshire in 1741 – 23 February 1742.

He died in 1747. He had married Mary, the daughter of Thomas Liddell of Bedford Row, London, with whom he had 2 sons and 2 daughters and was succeeded by his eldest son, Richard, also an MP for Denbigh.

Parliament of Great Britain
Preceded by Robert Myddelton	Member of Parliament for Denbigh Boroughs; 1733–1741	Succeeded by John Wynn
Preceded by Sir Watkin Williams-Wynn, 3rd Bt	Member of Parliament for Denbighshire; 1741–1742	Succeeded by Sir Watkin Williams-Wynn, 3rd Bt
