= Thirlwall =

Thirlwall is a surname. Notable people with the surname include:

- Anthony Thirlwall (born 1941), Professor of Applied Economics at the University of Kent
  - Thirlwall's Law, a law of economics
- Connop Thirlwall (1797–1875), English clergyman and historian, Bishop of Saint David's
  - Thirlwall Prize, awarded at Cambridge University
- Jade Thirlwall (born 1992), an English singer
- William Thirlwall, English MP

== See also ==
- Thirlwall Castle, Northumberland, England
- Thelwall
- Thelwell
