= William Robinson (died 1717) =

Welsh politician

William Robinson (c. 1668 – 15 November 1717), of Gwersyllt, Denbighshire, was a Welsh politician.

He sat in the Parliament of England as the Member of Parliament (MP) for Denbigh Boroughs from 1705 to 1708.

Parliament of England
Preceded by Edward Brereton	Member of Parliament for Denbigh Boroughs; 1705–1707	Succeeded by Parliament of Great Britain
Parliament of Great Britain
Preceded by Parliament of England	Member of Parliament for Denbigh Boroughs; 1707–1708	Succeeded by Sir William Williams, Bt
