= 1909 East Denbighshire by-election =

UK Parliamentary by-election

The 1909 East Denbighshire by-election was held on 2 April 1909. The by-election was held due to the incumbent Liberal MP, Edward Hemmerde, becoming Recorder of Liverpool. It was retained by Hemmerde.

1909 East Denbighshire by-election
Party	Candidate	Votes	%	±%
Liberal	Edward Hemmerde	6,265	63.9	−1.5
Liberal Unionist	Foster Cunliffe	3,544	36.1	+1.5
Majority		2,721	27.8	−3.0
Turnout		9,809	84.1	+3.2
Registered electors		11,670		
Liberal hold		Swing		
