= William Tudor Howell =

Welsh barrister and MP

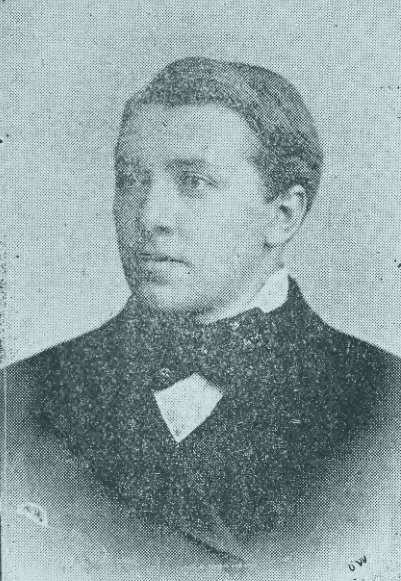
Image of William Tudor Howell

William Tudor Howell (19 October 1862 – 3 October 1911) was a Welsh barrister and Conservative politician who served as Member of Parliament for the constituency of Denbigh Boroughs between 1895 and 1900.

Howell was born in Pwllheli, the son of the Archdeacon David Howell, Dean of St David's (he was the vicar of Pwllheli at the time of his son's birth). His mother was Anne Powell who was from Pencoed.

He was educated at Wrexham Grammar School, Shrewsbury School and New College, Oxford where he graduated with a BA in 1885.

He was called to the bar at the Inner Temple in January 1887. He worked in chambers in London and he also had a practice in South Wales.

He was on the council of the Cymmrodorion and also a member of the London Welsh Committee for the defence of the Welsh Church. He was regarded as an excellent public speaker.

After the resignation of the sitting Conservative MP, George Thomas Kenyon, at the 1895 General election, Howell stood as the Conservative candidate in the constituency of Denbigh Boroughs. However, at the 1900 General Election, Howell decided that he would not seek re-election and Kenyon agreed to stand again.

After giving up his seat Howell returned to his work as a barrister. According to the 1901 Census he was living in Brighton and married to Louise May a 30-year-old woman born in Nice, France; they eventually had two children. Around 1911, he bought a ranch by Kootenay Lake, near Nelson, British Columbia in Canada. He died shortly after on 3 October 1911.

Parliament of the United Kingdom
Preceded by George Thomas Kenyon	Member of Parliament for Denbigh Boroughs; 1895–1900	Succeeded by George Thomas Kenyon
