= Edward Hemmerde =

British politician and playwright (1871–1948)

Hemmerde in 1909

Edward George Hemmerde, KC (13 November 1871 – 24 May 1948) was an English rower, barrister, politician, playwright and Georgist.

== Education, the Law and family ==
Hemmerde was born at Peckham, south London, the son of James Godfrey Hemmerde and his wife Frances Hope. His father was a bank manager with the Imperial Ottoman Bank. Hemmerde was educated at Winchester College and University College, Oxford. At Oxford he was a successful single sculler, and won the Diamond Challenge Sculls at Henley Royal Regatta in 1900, beating the previous winner American B H Howell. He was called to the Bar by the Inner Temple in 1897 and established his law practice. In 1908, he took silk and was appointed Recorder of Liverpool in 1909, although his relations with the city authorities there were seldom good. He married Lucy Elinor Colley at Chelsea, London, in 1903 but they were divorced in 1922. They had a son (who was killed in 1926) and a daughter.

== Liberal candidate ==
Hemmerde first tried to enter Parliament at the general election of 1900 when he fought Winchester. He was next selected by Shropshire Liberals for a by-election at Shrewsbury expected in 1904. However, there was no by-election and he remained to contest Shrewsbury at the 1906 General Election. He was soon after elected as a Liberal Party Member of Parliament for the East Denbighshire constituency at a by-election on 14 August 1906, the sitting Liberal MP, Samuel Moss, having resigned to take up an appointment as a county court judge.

== Liberal MP ==
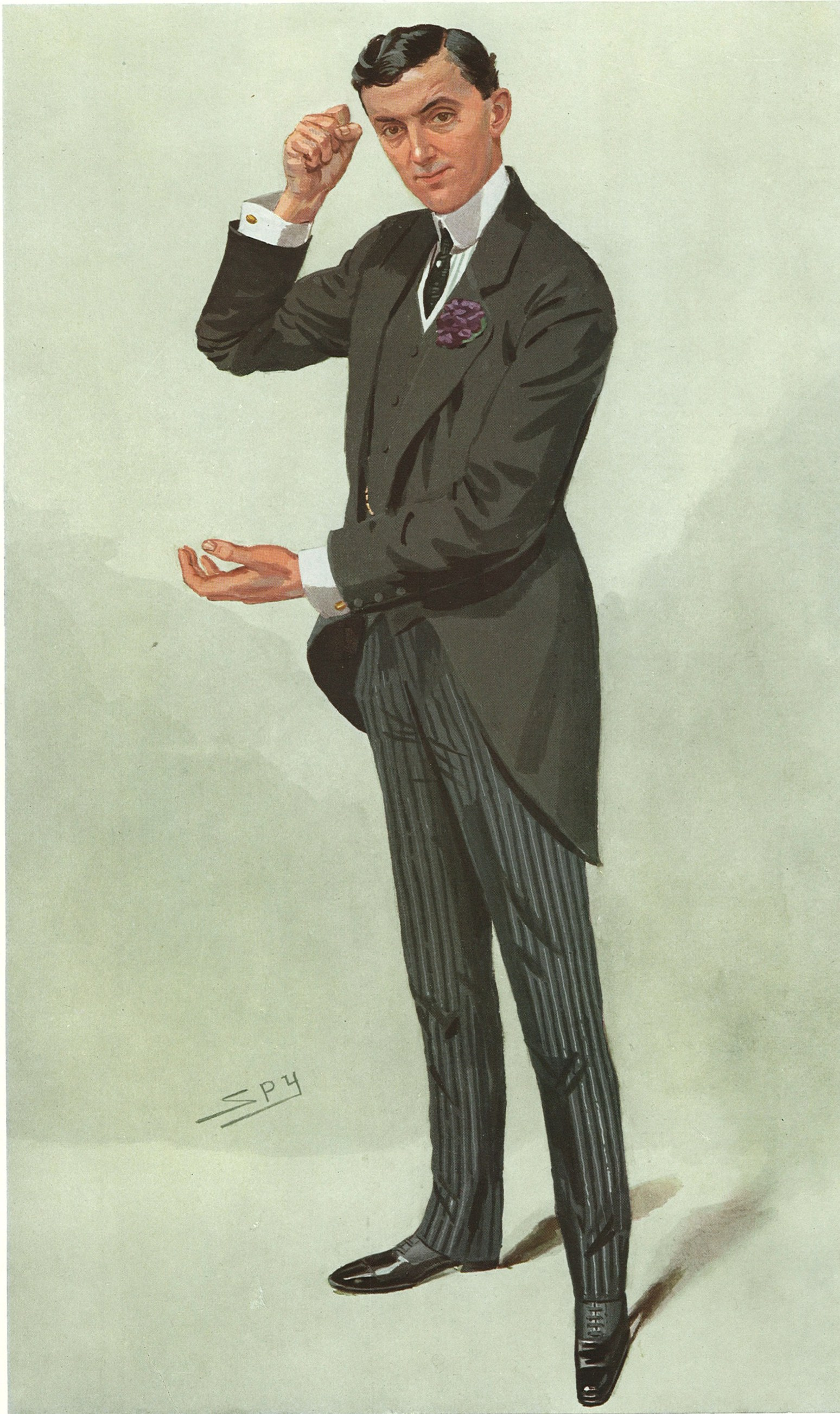
As depicted by "Spy" (Leslie Ward) in Vanity Fair, 19 May 1909

Hemmerde held his seat in East Denbighshire until 1910. In November 1910, he announced that he had been asked by the party leadership to give up his seat in Wales and fight the Conservative, Lord Charles Beresford who, as a naval man had been involved in bitter political clashes with the government over the funding of the navy and who represented Portsmouth. Hemmerde was publicly reluctant to do so but nevertheless agreed. However it is clear that Hemmerde was encountering difficulties in East Denbighshire with the local party organisers over a number of issues. They felt he did not attend enough to constituency business or visit the seat for important local occasions. They felt he was spending too much time on his legal practice and was not spending enough money on constituency organisation. These troubles obviously made the prospect of transferring to another seat attractive. There were rumours that the Whips' Office had offered to pay Hemmerde's outstanding debts if he did so. However Hemmerde was unsuccessful in the contest in Portsmouth in the December 1910 general election. Not wishing to be out of Parliament, Hemmerde began looking for another seat and in 1912 he was selected as the candidate for North West Norfolk for the by-election pending there following the death of Sir George White the sitting Liberal MP. Hemmerde won the seat, albeit with a reduced majority, and represented the area until 1918. In Parliament Hemmerde was one of the principal advocates of the movement for the taxation of land values and often found himself at odds with the official land policy of the Liberal Party, although he could be emollient on the issue.

== The Coupon and defection to Labour ==
According to one historian of the Liberal Party, Hemmerde was regarded as a supporter of H. H. Asquith until the occasion of the Maurice Debate of 9 May 1918 when the Asquithian Liberals voted against the Lloyd George led coalition government on a motion arising from criticisms by the recently sacked Director of Military Operations that the Prime Minister had misled Parliament concerning British troop strength on the Western Front. Hemmerde decided to support the government in the Maurice Debate and was rewarded with an invitation to No. 10 Downing Street and, according to his own account, was promised government endorsement at the forthcoming general election. In the event however he was denied the Coalition Coupon at the 1918 general election and finding himself out of Parliament defected to the Labour Party in 1920. He was the first Labour MP for Crewe from 1922 to 1924.

== Scandal ==
Hemmerde was associated with a City financial scandal in 1913 and in 1922 was involved in a separate court case concerning his personal finances. It was reported that although there was a just claim against him for the money lent him he avoided payment by pleading the Statute of Limitations. After this incident, although he retained his Recordership and continued to practice law on the Northern Circuit he withdrew from political life.

== Playwright ==
Hemmerde was also a playwright. In 1912 he wrote the play A Maid of Honour under the pseudonym, Edward Denby. He co-authored (with Francis Neilson, a fellow MP) the plays, A Butterfly on the Wheel (1912) and The Crucible. In his own name he wrote the plays Proud Maisie (1915) and A Cardinal's Romance and jointly with Cicely Fraser, The Dead Hand.

Parliament of the United Kingdom
Preceded by Samuel Moss	Member of Parliament for East Denbighshire; 1906 – Dec. 1910	Succeeded by Edward John
Preceded by George White	Member of Parliament for North West Norfolk; 1912–1918	Constituency abolished
Preceded by Joseph Davies	Member of Parliament for Crewe; 1922–1924	Succeeded by Ernest Craig
