= Eubule Thelwall (academic, died 1727) =

Principal of Jesus College, Oxford

Eubule Thelwall (c. 1682 – 20 June 1727; /ˈjuːbʌˌleɪ/ YOO-buh-lay) was Principal of Jesus College, Oxford, from 1725 to 1727.

Thelwall came from Ruthin, Denbighshire, Wales and matriculated at St Mary's Hall, Oxford at the age of 17 in 1699. He graduated with a BA degree in 1702 and became a Fellow of Jesus College in the same year. He later proceeded by seniority to MA in 1705 and graduated BD (1713) and DD (1726).

He remained Principal until his death of 20 June 1727, and was buried in the college chapel.
