= George Thomas Kenyon =

British politician

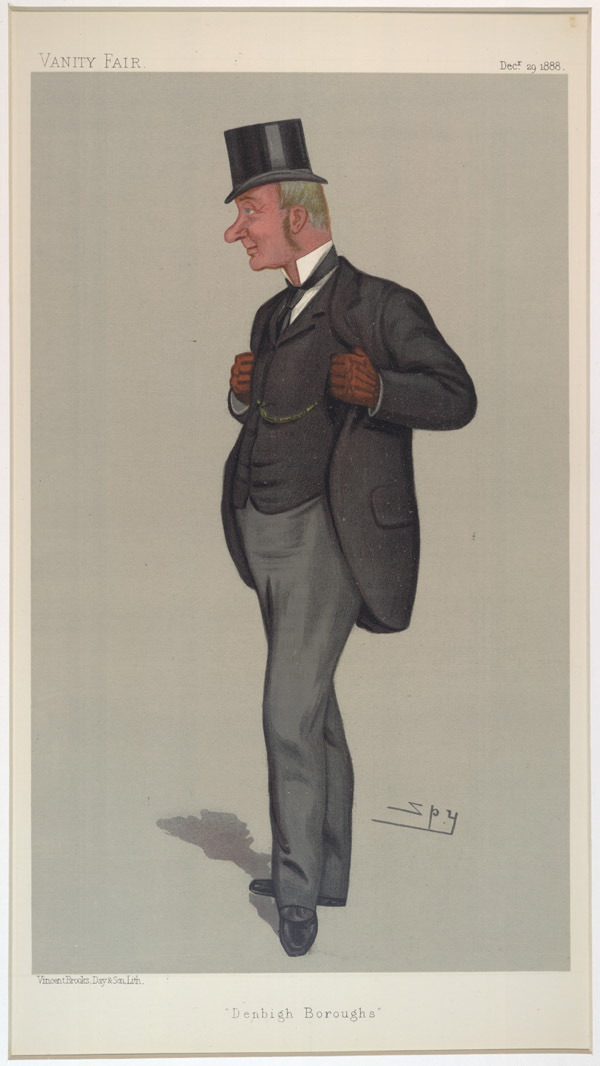
"Denbigh Boroughs". Caricature by Spy published in Vanity Fair in 1888.

George Thomas Kenyon (28 December 1840 – 26 January 1908) was a British Conservative Party politician who sat in the House of Commons in two periods between 1885 and 1906.

Kenyon was born in London, the second son of Lloyd Kenyon, 3rd Baron Kenyon and his wife Hon. Georgina de Grey, daughter of Thomas de Grey, 4th Baron Walsingham. He was educated at Harrow School and at Christ Church, Oxford, where he graduated as Bachelor of Arts (BA) in 1864 and Master (MA) in 1870. He was called to the bar at Middle Temple in 1869.

He entered the North Shropshire Yeomanry Cavalry as a cornet in 1865, was lieutenant when the regiment amalgamated in the unified Shropshire Yeomanry regiment in 1872, was promoted captain in 1873, and resigned in 1879.

He was a J.P. and Deputy Lieutenant for Flintshire and a J.P. for Shropshire. He was guardian to his nephew, Lloyd Tyrell-Kenyon, 4th Baron Kenyon who inherited the title at the age of five, of whom throughout his lifetime George was also heir-presumptive, his nephew then being unmarried.

At the 1874 and 1880 general elections, Kenyon stood unsuccessfully for the Denbigh Boroughs. He was elected Member of Parliament for Denbigh at the 1885 general election and held the seat until he stood down in 1895. He unsuccessfully stood at a by-election for East Denbighshire in 1897, losing mainly through his unpopular protectionist views. He was elected again for Denbigh Boroughs in 1900 and held the seat until he was defeated in 1906. In August 1907 he announced his intention not to stand for parliament again.

His main interests were in promoting secondary and further education in Wales. He promoted the passing of the Welsh Intermediate Education Act 1889, and was a founder of the University of Wales, which he served as Junior Deputy Chancellor in 1898–1900. He was founder Chairman of the Wrexham and Ellesmere Railway company from 1891 until his death.

Kenyon played cricket as a wicket keeper, playing in county matches for Cheshire, Denbighshire, and Shropshire while playing at club level for Hanmer.

Kenyon married Florence Anna Leche in 1875.

Kenyon lived at Llanerch-Panna, Penley, Flintshire, where he died at the age of 67 after failure to fully recover from a recent accident. He was buried on 30 January 1908 at nearby Hanmer churchyard.

Parliament of the United Kingdom
Preceded by Sir Robert Cunliffe, 5th Baronet	Member of Parliament for Denbigh Boroughs; 1885–1895	Succeeded by William Tudor Howell
Preceded by William Tudor Howell	Member of Parliament for Denbigh Boroughs; 1900–1906	Succeeded by Clement Edwards
