= Simon Thelwall (of Cefn Coch) =

Simon Thelwall (born 1561 – date of death unknown) was a Welsh politician who sat in the House of Commons in 1593.

Thelwall was the seventh son of John Wyn Thelwall of Bathafern Park. He entered Balliol College, Oxford on 16 October 1581, aged 20 and was awarded BA from St Mary Hall, Oxford on 28 February 1584. He was the brother of lawyer and politician Eubule Thelwall.

He became a student of Lincoln's Inn in 1591, and practised as a Proctor of the Court of Arches. He was Registrar of the diocese of Bangor, and Chief Clerk to Sir Daniel Donne Judge of the Prerogative Court. In 1593, he was elected member of parliament for Denbigh. He held the estate of Cefn Coch. He was one of those who received a grant on 22 August 1631 of the post of Master of the Office of Revels.

He married Ann Biggs of Woodford. They had two sons and two daughters.

Parliament of England
Preceded by John Towerbridge	Member of Parliament for Denbigh; 1593	Succeeded by John Panton
