= Richard Cavendish (Denbigh Boroughs MP) =

Member of the Parliament of England

Richard Cavendish (died c. 1601) of Trimley St Martin, Suffolk, and of Nottinghamshire was an English courtier and politician.

He was a Member (MP) of the Parliament of England for Denbigh Boroughs in 1572 and 1584.

== Life ==
He was the second son of Sir Richard Gernon, alias Cavendish, by his wife Beatrice Gould, and was a native of Suffolk. He was for some time a member of Corpus Christi College, Cambridge.

In 1568 and 1569 Cavendish was engaged in conveying to Mary, Queen of Scots letters and tokens to further her marriage with Thomas Howard, 4th Duke of Norfolk; in 1569 the earls of Shrewsbury and Huntingdon in the latter year tried to capture Cavendish and prevent the circulation of his writings. He then appeared as a witness against the Duke of Norfolk at his trial on 16 January 1572, when the duke reproached him. To the parliament which met 8 May 1572 he was returned for Denbigh Boroughs, in opposition to the wishes of the Earl of Leicester. He was created M.A. of the university of Cambridge on 15 February 1573; the grace for his degree stated that he had studied for 28 years at Cambridge and Oxford. He was a second time returned for Denbigh to the parliament which assembled on 23 November 1585.

In 1587 a conflict occurred, later taken to be of constitutional importance in relation to the royal prerogative. Cavendish had suggested to the Queen that it was in her power to create a new office for making out all writs of supersedeas in the Court of Common Pleas; and she granted the post to him for a number of years. The court resisted and obstructed the Queen; the lord chancellor reported the proceedings to the Queen, who avoided the potential collision between the prerogative and the law, by allowing the matter to drop.

Cavendish may have died in 1601: in that year a monument to his memory "promised and made by Margaret, countess of Cumberland", was erected to his memory in the south aisle of Hornsey Church, Middlesex.

== Works ==
Cavendish was the author of:

- A Translation of Euclid into English.
- The Image of Natvre and Grace, conteyning the whole course and condition of Mans Estate. Written by Richard Caundishe, London, John Day, n.d. and 1574, dedicated to "those who, through simplicitie of conscience and lacke of true knowledge, embrace the doctrine of the papistes".

A poem in the Paradyse of Dayntie Devises has been ascribed to Thomas Cavendish the circumnavigator, his nephew, as well as to Richard Cavendish.
