= Simon Thelwall (MP died 1586) =

Welsh politician

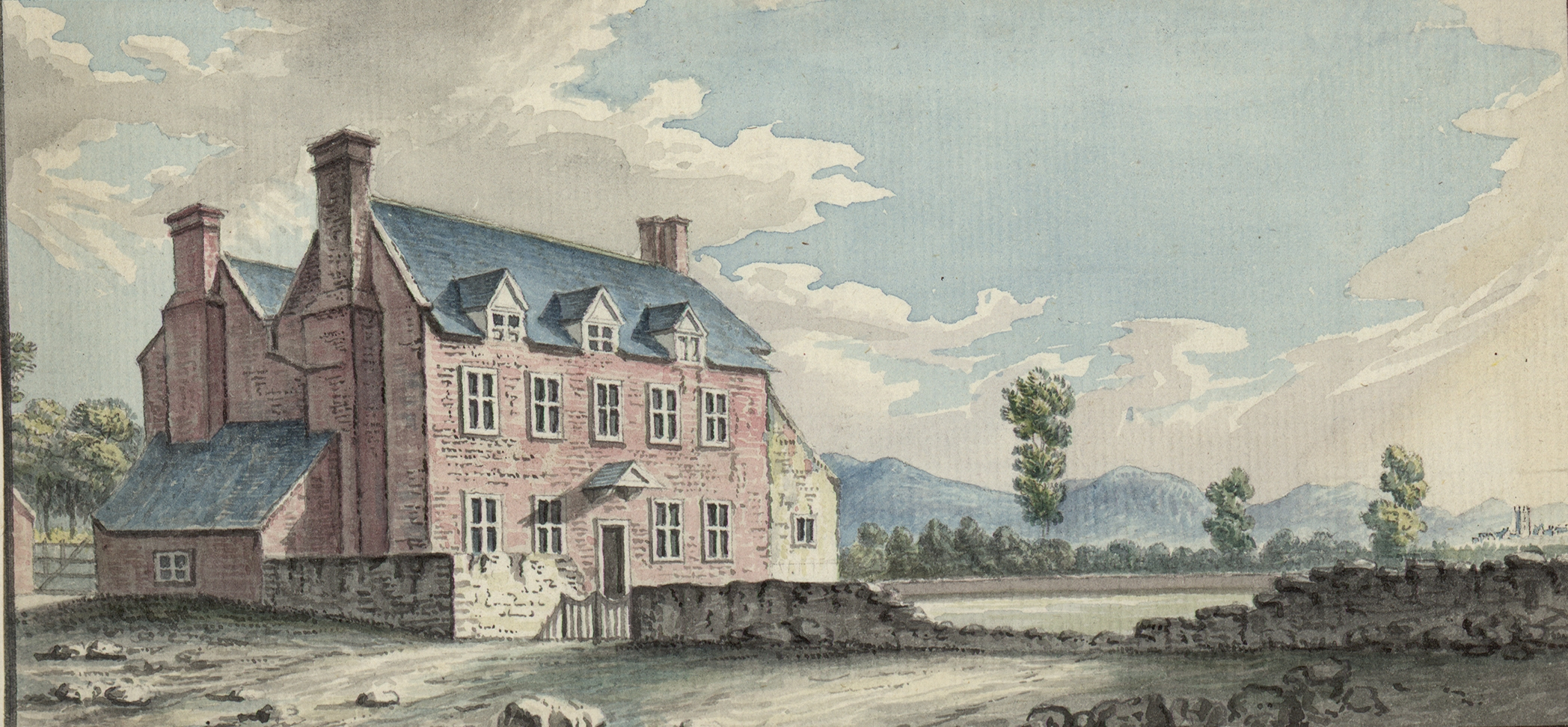
Plas-y-Ward, Llanynys

Simon Thelwall or Theloal (1525/26–1586), of Plas y Ward, Llanynys, Denbighshire, was a Welsh politician.

He was a Member (MP) of the Parliament of England for Denbigh Boroughs March 1553, October 1553, 1559 and 1571, and for Denbighshire in 1563.

He married Margaret Griffith, daughter of William Griffith.
