= Simon Thelwall (MP died 1659) =

English politician

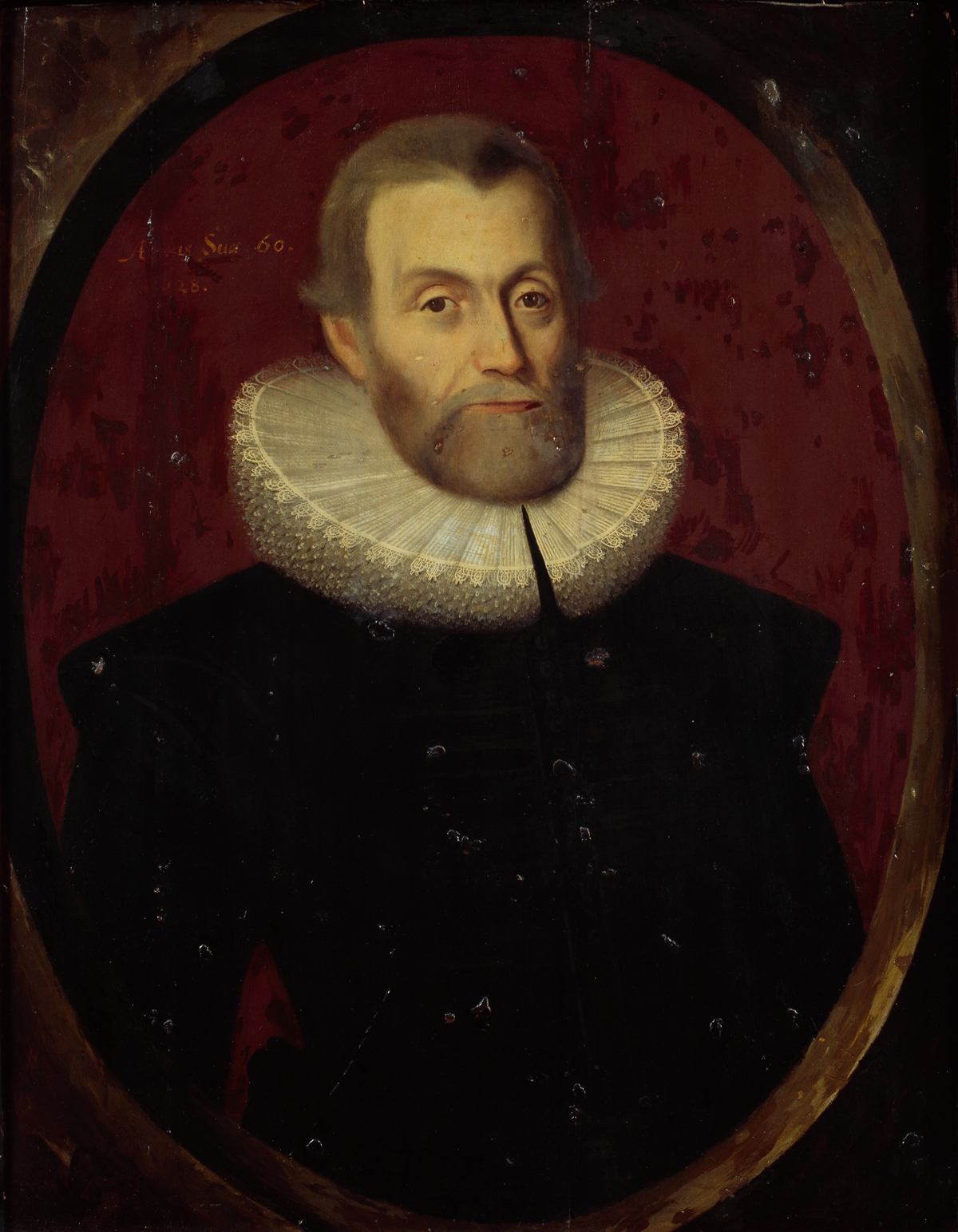
Simon Thelwall in 1630

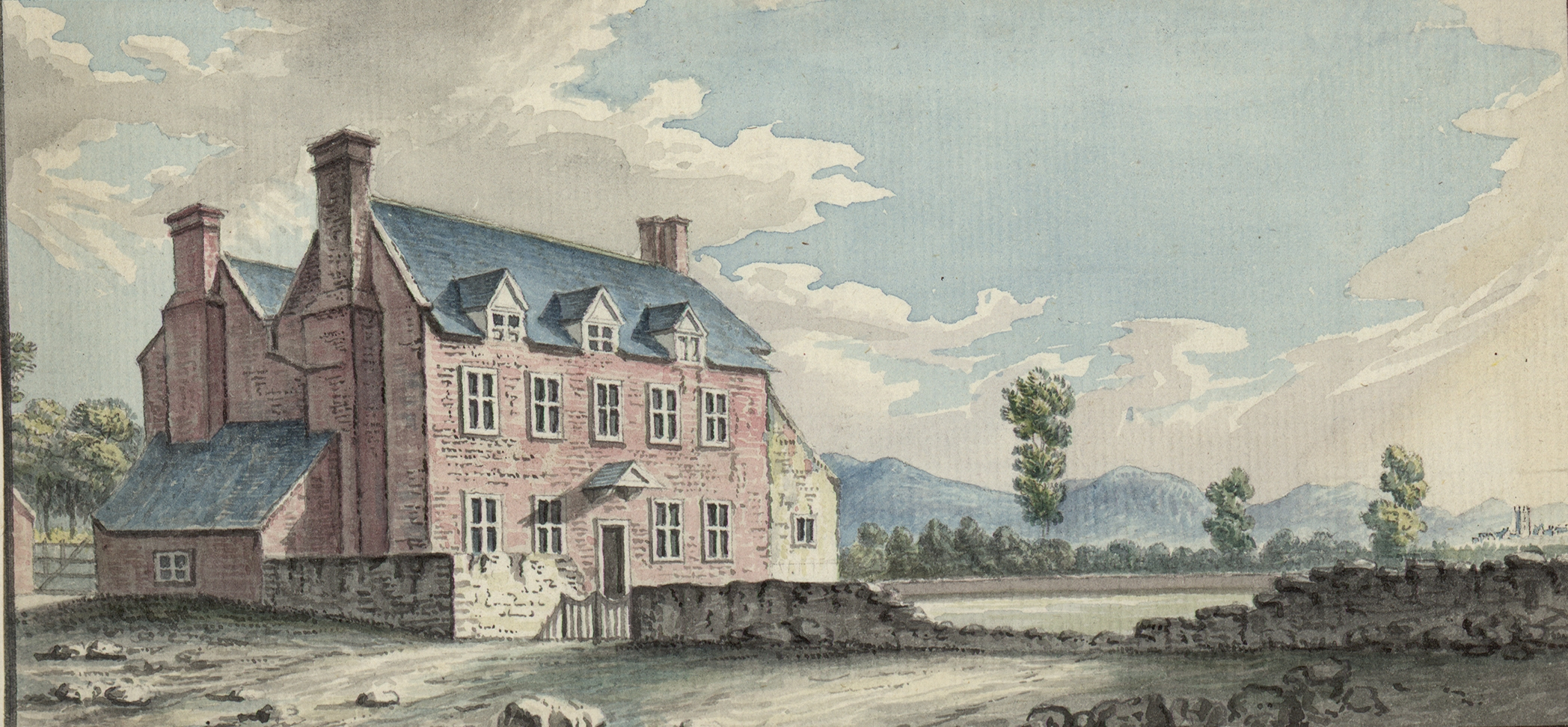
Plas-y-Ward, Llanynys, the family seat

Simon Thelwall (1601–1659) was a Welsh politician who sat in the House of Commons at various times between 1640 and 1654. He fought in the Parliamentary army in the English Civil War.

Thelwall was the son of either Simon or Edward Thelwall of Plas-y-ward. He was admitted at Lincoln College, Oxford on 7 June 1616 aged 15. He was sworn a burgess of Denbigh of 31 March 1634, and was admitted to Inner Temple in November 1637.

In November 1640, Thelwall was elected Member of Parliament for Denbigh in the Long Parliament. During the Civil War, he was driven out of Denbighshire and fled to Pembrokeshire. As Major Thelwall he helped drive the Royalists out of Pembrokeshire in 1643. He was one of the commanders who received the surrender of Denbigh Castle in 1646. He became a Deputy Lieutenant for Denbighshire on 2 July 1646 and became commissioner to manage Denbighshire in May 1648, was one of the Committee for North Wales in June 1648 and commissioner for pious uses for the use of the corporation on 17 November 1648. He was excluded from Parliament in December 1648 under Pride's Purge. He was elected MP for Denbighshire in 1654 for the First Protectorate Parliament.

Thelwall married firstly Margaret Sheffield, daughter of Edmund Sheffield, 1st Earl of Mulgrave. He married secondly Dorothy Meredith, widow of Andrew Meredith of Glantared and daughter of John Owen Vychard of Llwydiarth. Lumley Thelwall was his brother.

Parliament of England
Preceded by John Salusbury	Member of Parliament for Denbigh; 1640–1648	Vacant Not represented in Rump Parliament Title next held by John Manley
Vacant Not represented in Barebones Parliament Title last held by Sir Thomas Myddelton	Member of Parliament for Denbighshire; 1654; With: John Carter	Succeeded by John Carter; John Jones
