= John Panton (MP) =

English politician

John Panton (died 1619), of Henllan, Denbighshire and Westminster, Middlesex, was a Welsh politician.

He was a member (MP) of the parliament of England for Denbigh Boroughs in 1597 and 1601 and for Harwich in 1604.
