= Lumley Thelwall =

Members of the Parliament of England from Wales

Lumley Thelwall was a Welsh politician who sat in the House of Commons in 1656.

Thelwall was the son of either Simon or Edward Thelwall of Plas-y-ward in Denbighshire. He was a captain in the Parliamentary army in the English Civil War. In April 1649 he was ordered to take his troop to Ireland. On 18 June 1649, Calendar State Papers record "Letters that the inhabitants of Drayton in Shropshire, on the last Lord's Day in the Night, fell upon Capt. Thelwel's Troop, and disarmed and pillaged them. Col. Clive late M.P. caused great alarm, having led a riotous multitude to attack the troop of horse of Capt. Lumley Thelwell, and dispersed them as traitors and rebels, and seized and sold their horses in the open market in Salop." An order of the Council of State was made 30 September 1650 for writing a letter to the Lord Deputy of Ireland, recommending Capt. Lumley Thelwall for the office of Sword Bearer in Ireland.

In 1656, he was elected Member of Parliament for Denbighshire for the Second Protectorate Parliament replacing John Jones who chose to sit for Merioneth.

Thelwall was the brother of Simon Thelwall.

Parliament of England
Preceded by John Carter; John Jones	Member of Parliament for Denbighshire; 1656; With: John Carter	Succeeded by John Carter
