= East Denbighshire =

UK Parliament constituency (1885–1918)

- Former county constituency for the House of Commons

1885–1918
- Seats: one
- Created from: Denbighshire
- Replaced by: Denbigh and Wrexham

East Denbighshire, formally called the Eastern Division of Denbighshire, was a county constituency in Denbighshire, in Wales. It returned one Member of Parliament (MP) to the House of Commons of the Parliament of the United Kingdom, elected by the first past the post voting system.

== History ==
The constituency was created by the Redistribution of Seats Act 1885 for the 1885 general election, when the two-member Denbighshire constituency was divided into Eastern and Western divisions. It was abolished for the 1918 general election.

== Members of Parliament ==
Election	Member	Party
1885	Sir George Osborne Morgan, Bt	Liberal
1897 by-election	Samuel Moss	Liberal
1906 by-election	Edward Hemmerde	Liberal
Dec. 1910	Edward John	Liberal
1918	constituency abolished	

== Elections ==
=== Elections in the 1880s ===
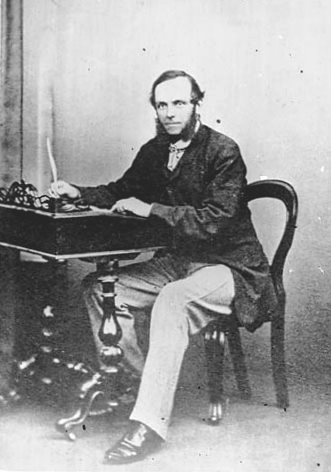
George Morgan

General election 1885: East Denbighshire
Party	Candidate	Votes	%	±%
Liberal	George Osborne Morgan	3,831	52.7	
Conservative	Herbert Williams-Wynn	3,438	47.3	
Majority		393	5.4	
Turnout		7,269	87.6	
Registered electors		8,297		
Liberal win (new seat)				

General election 1886: East Denbighshire
Party	Candidate	Votes	%	±%
Liberal	George Osborne Morgan	3,536	50.2	−2.5
Conservative	Herbert Williams-Wynn	3,510	49.8	+2.5
Majority		26	0.4	−5.0
Turnout		7,046	84.9	−2.7
Registered electors		8,297		
Liberal hold		Swing	−2.5	

=== Elections in the 1890s ===
General election 1892: East Denbighshire
Party	Candidate	Votes	%	±%
Liberal	George Osborne Morgan	4,189	55.0	+4.8
Conservative	Herbert Williams-Wynn	3,423	45.0	−4.8
Majority		766	10.0	+9.6
Turnout		7,612	76.6	−8.3
Registered electors		9,941		
Liberal hold		Swing	+4.8	

Sir G.O. Morgan

General election 1895: East Denbighshire
Party	Candidate	Votes	%	±%
Liberal	George Osborne Morgan	4,899	61.1	+6.1
Conservative	Henry St John Digby Raikes	3,115	38.9	−6.1
Majority		1,784	22.2	+12.2
Turnout		8,014	83.5	+6.9
Registered electors		9,592		
Liberal hold		Swing	+6.1	

Morgan's death causes a by-election.

1897 East Denbighshire by-election
Party	Candidate	Votes	%	±%
Liberal	Samuel Moss	5,175	64.5	+3.4
Conservative	George Thomas Kenyon	2,848	35.5	−3.4
Majority		2,327	29.0	+6.8
Turnout		8,023	84.4	+0.9
Registered electors		9,501		
Liberal hold		Swing	+3.4	

=== Elections in the 1900s ===
Samuel Moss

General election 1900: East Denbighshire
Party	Candidate	Votes	%	±%
Liberal	Samuel Moss	Unopposed		
Liberal hold				

General election 1906: East Denbighshire
Party	Candidate	Votes	%	±%
Liberal	Samuel Moss	Unopposed		
Liberal hold				

E.G. Hemmerde

1906 East Denbighshire by-election
Party	Candidate	Votes	%	±%
Liberal	Edward Hemmerde	5,917	65.4	N/A
Conservative	Arthur Griffith-Boscawen	3,126	34.6	New
Majority		2,791	30.8	N/A
Turnout		9,043	80.9	N/A
Registered electors		11,172		
Liberal hold		Swing	N/A	

1909 East Denbighshire by-election
Party	Candidate	Votes	%	±%
Liberal	Edward Hemmerde	6,265	63.9	−1.5
Liberal Unionist	Foster Cunliffe	3,544	36.1	+1.5
Majority		2,721	27.8	−3.0
Turnout		9,809	84.1	+3.2
Registered electors		11,670		
Liberal hold		Swing		

=== Elections in the 1910s ===
General election January 1910: East Denbighshire
Party	Candidate	Votes	%	±%
Liberal	Edward Hemmerde	6,865	67.4	N/A
Conservative	David Rhys	3,321	32.6	N/A
Majority		3,544	34.8	N/A
Turnout		10,186	85.5	N/A
Registered electors		11,911		
Liberal hold		Swing	N/A	

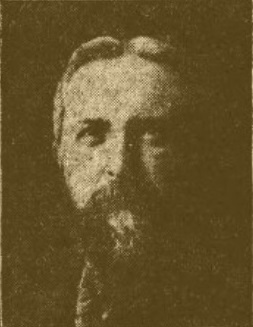
John

General election December 1910: East Denbighshire
Party	Candidate	Votes	%	±%
Liberal	Edward John	6,449	66.9	−0.5
Conservative	Alfred Hood	3,186	33.1	+0.5
Majority		3,263	33.8	−1.0
Turnout		9,635	80.9	−4.6
Registered electors		11,911		
Liberal hold		Swing	−0.5	

General Election 1914–15:

Another General Election was required to take place before the end of 1915. The political parties had been making preparations for an election to take place and by July 1914, the following candidates had been selected;

- Liberal: Edward John
- Unionist: J. Downes Powell
