= Lap Engine =

Beam engine designed by James Watt

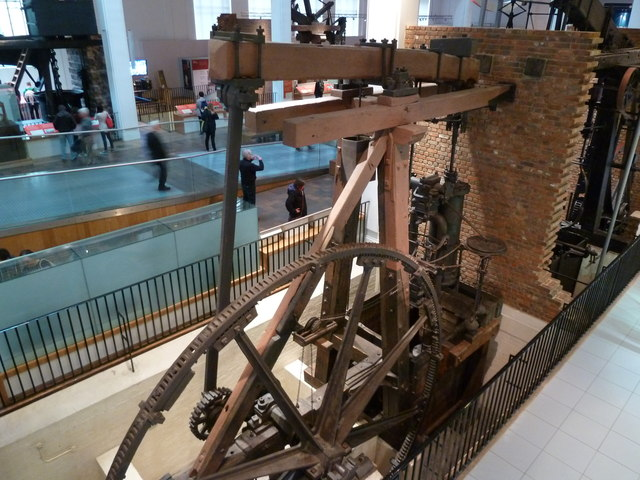

Origins
- Type: Watt rotative beam engine
- Designer: James Watt
- Maker: Boulton and Watt
- Date: 1788
- Country of origin: England
- Former operator: Soho Manufactory
- Purpose: Driving factory machinery

Measurements
- Cylinders: 1
- Bore: 18.75 inches (47.6 cm)
- Stroke: 4 feet (1.2 m)

Preservation
- Collection: Science Museum Group
- Location: Science Museum, London
- Accession no.: 1861–46
- Working: No

The Lap Engine is a beam engine designed by James Watt, built by Boulton and Watt in 1788. It is now preserved at the Science Museum, London.

It is important as both an early example of a beam engine by Boulton and Watt, and also mainly as illustrating an important innovative step in their development for its ability to produce rotary motion.

The engines name comes from its use in Matthew Boulton's Soho Manufactory, where it was used to drive a line of 43 polishing or lapping machines, used for the production of buttons and buckles.

== Innovations ==
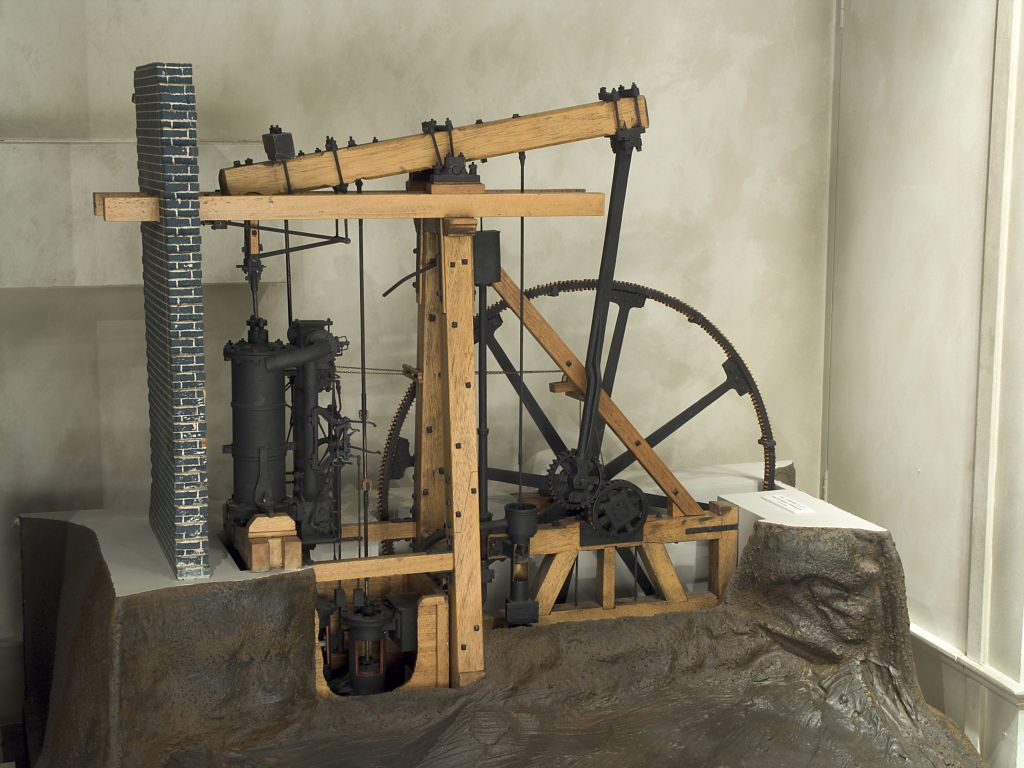
A 1950 model of the engine, now in Thinktank, Birmingham Science Museum

Watt did not invent the steam engine and there is no single 'Watt steam engine' as such. He developed a number of separate innovations, each of which improved the existing engines of the day, beginning with Newcomen's. The Lap Engine of 1788, also the Whitbread Engine (1785), represent survivors of the first engines to show all of Watt's major improvements in one.

=== Sun and planet gear ===
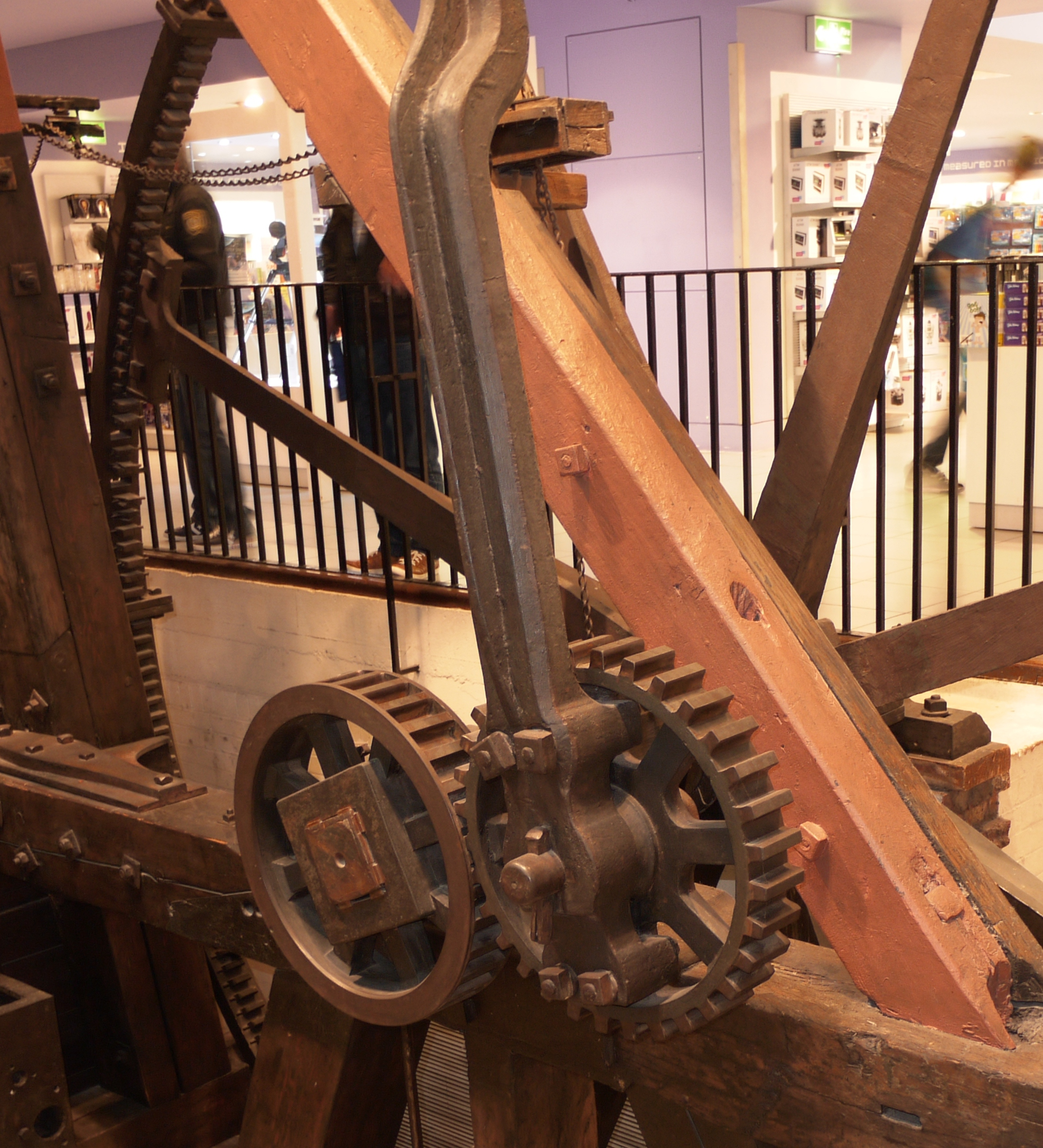
The sun and planet gear

The rotative beam engine needs a means to convert reciprocating motion of the piston and beam to rotary motion. The crankshaft was well known for centuries before Watt, mostly from its use in mining machinery powered by water wheels. However its use for a steam engine was covered by James Pickard's patent at this time. Watt was unwilling to pay a license fee to use the crank and so sought an alternative. The sun and planet gear was invented by another Scottish engineer, William Murdoch, an employee of Boulton and Watt. Watt patented it in October 1781.

The sun and planet gear is a simple epicyclic gear. The planet is attached rigidly to the end of the connecting rod, hung from the beam. As it rotates it applies a torque to the sun gear, just as for a crank, and so causes it to rotate. As the two gears also rotate relative to each other, like conventional gearwheels, this has the effect of giving the sun gear a further rotation. The sun, and the output crankshaft, thus rotates twice for every piston cycle of the engine, twice as fast as with a conventional crank. Beam engines were slow-moving and the output shafts driven by the Lap Engine were fast-moving, so this was an advantage.

=== Centrifugal governor ===
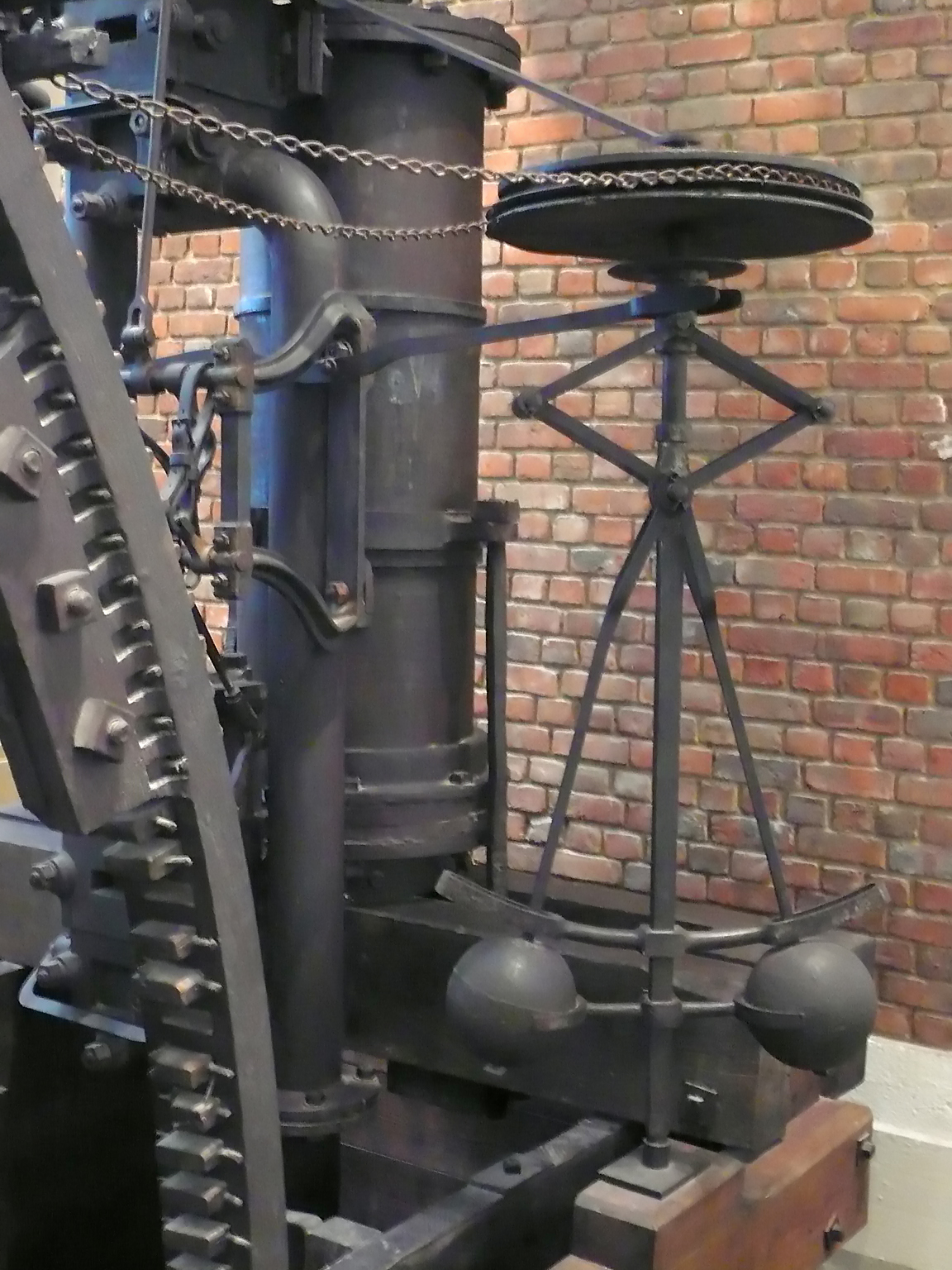
The Watt-type centrifugal governor at the Science Museum, London.

According to the Science Museum, it was the first steam engine to be fitted with a centrifugal governor. (Note: The earlier Whitbread Engine of 1785, and the 1786 engine at the National Museum of Scotland also have a centrifugal governor.)
