= Logan Henderson (disambiguation) =

Logan Henderson may refer to:

People:

- Logan Henderson (born 1989), American singer and actor
- Logan Henderson (baseball) (born 2002), American baseball player
- Logan Henderson (engineer) (18th century), English engineer

Places:

- Logan Henderson Farm, historic farm house in Tennessee
