= Whitbread Engine =

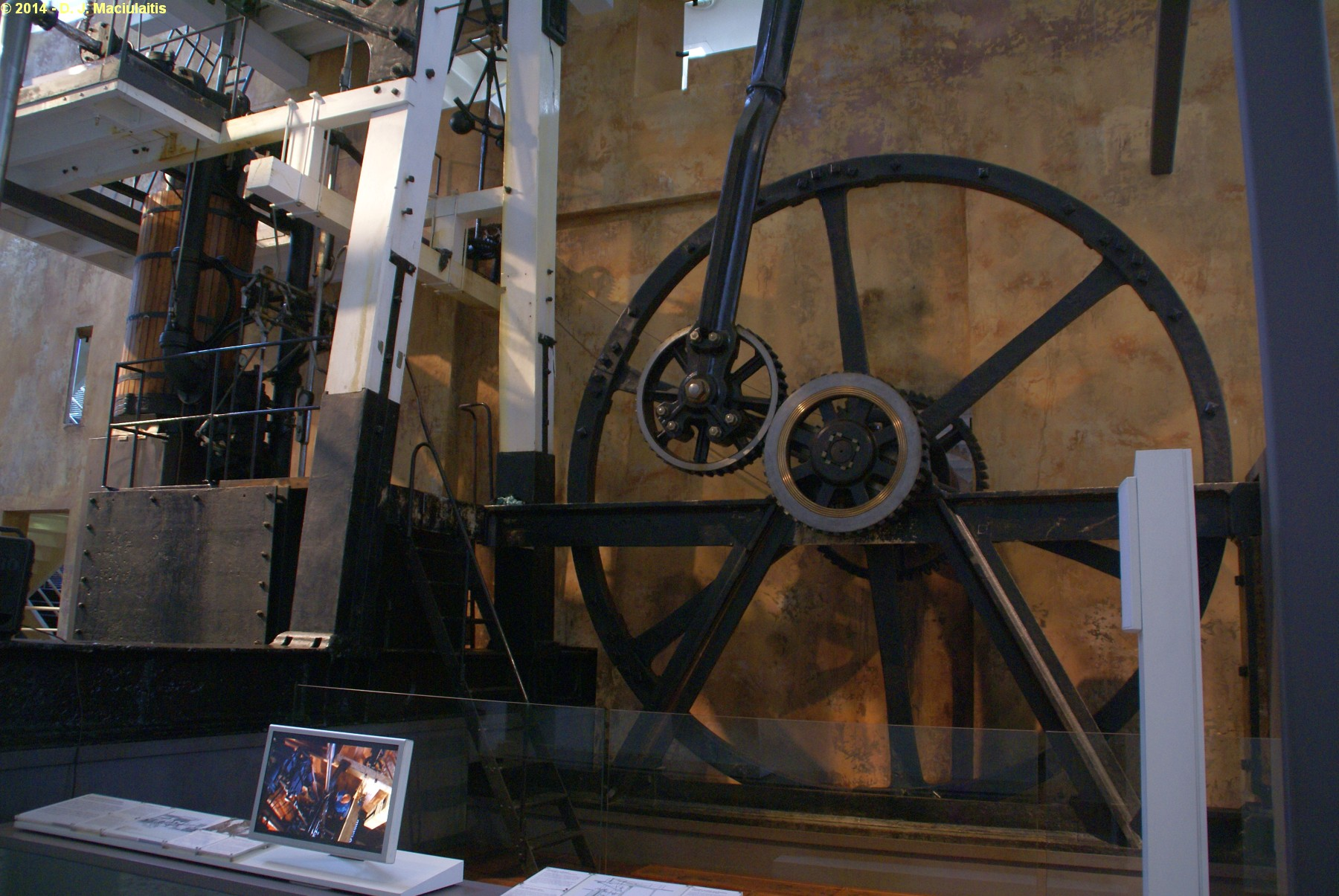
- Boulton & Watt steam engine decommissioned in 1887, at the Powerhouse Museum

Origins
- Type: Watt, rotative beam
- Designer: James Watt
- Maker: Boulton and Watt
- Date: 1785
- Country of origin: England
- Former operator: Whitbread, London, England
- Purpose: Driving brewery machinery

Measurements
- Cylinders: 1
- Bore: 0.64 metres (25 in)
- Stroke: 1.8 metres (6 ft)
- Flywheel diameter: 4.27 metres (10 ft)
- Power: 26 kilowatts (35 hp) (as built)

Preservation
- Location: Powerhouse Museum, Sydney, Australia; 33.877898°S 151.199573°E
- URL: collection.powerhouse.com.au/object/7177

The Whitbread Engine preserved in the Powerhouse Museum in Sydney, Australia, built in 1785, is one of the first rotative steam engines ever built, and is the oldest surviving. A rotative engine is a type of beam engine where the reciprocating motion of the beam is converted to rotary motion, producing a continuous power source suitable for driving machinery.

This engine was designed by the mechanical engineer James Watt, of the firm Boulton and Watt, and originally installed in the Whitbread brewery in London, England. On decommissioning in 1887 it was sent to Australia's Powerhouse Museum (then known as the Technological, Industrial and Sanitary Museum) and has since been restored to full working order.

== History ==
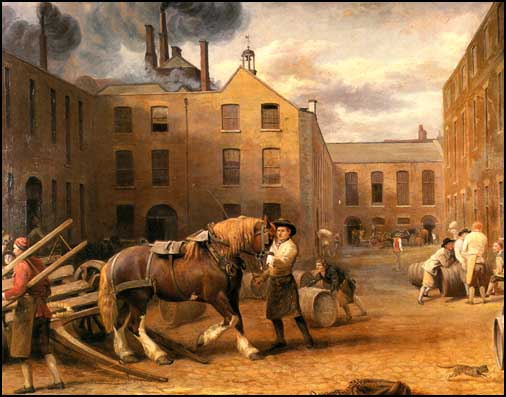
The Whitbread brewery in London at the time of the engine's use.

The sun and planet gear mechanism that converts vertical motion to rotary motion.

The engine was ordered by Samuel Whitbread in 1784 to replace a horse wheel at the Chiswell Street premises of his London brewery. It was installed in 1785, the second steam engine to be installed in a brewery, and enabled Whitbread to become the largest brewer in Britain. The horse wheel was retained for many years, serving as a backup in case the steam engine broke down. The drive gear of the engine, still evident today, was connected to a series of wooden line shafts which drove machinery within the brewery. Connected machinery included rollers to crush malt; an Archimedes' screw, that lifted the crushed malt into a hopper; a hoist, for lifting items into the building; a three-piston pump, for pumping beer; and a stirrer within a vat. There was also a reciprocating pump connected to the engine's beam, used to pump water from a well to a tank on the roof of the brewery.

In a marketing coup for both the brewer and the engine's manufacturer, King George III and Queen Charlotte visited the brewery on 24 May 1787. The engine remained in service for 102 years, until 1887.

The engine made its way to the Powerhouse Museum (then known as the Technological, Industrial and Sanitary Museum) through Archibald Liversidge, an English-born chemist, scientist and academic at the University of Sydney, who was a trustee of the museum. Liversidge was in London in 1887, at the time of the engine's decommissioning, and when he heard that the engine was to be scrapped he asked whether it could be donated to the museum. Whitbread & Co agreed on condition that the engine be set up and used for educational purposes.

Subsequently, the engine was dismantled and shipped to Sydney on the sailing ship Patriarch. For shipping purposes, the large flywheel was divided into two halves. While the flywheel's rim could be unbolted, the hub with attached spokes had to be drilled through and rejoined after shipping. A shortage of funds meant the engine was kept in storage for several years. Eventually the engine was erected in its own engine house, behind the main building at the museum's old Harris Street premises. During the 1920s or 1930s, an electric motor was added so that people could see the engine in motion. During the 1980s the Technology Restoration Society was formed in order to raise funds for the engine's restoration. Restoration took place at the museum's Castle Hill site. During the restoration, some parts – including the piston – were replaced to preserve the original parts. The engine, restored to steaming condition, was installed in the new Powerhouse Museum in 1988. Today the engine is sometimes operated as part of the museum's Steam Revolution exhibition, steam being provided by the museum's central boiler.

== Technical specifications ==
The engine has a 0.64 metres (25 in) diameter piston with a 1.8 metres (6 ft) long stroke, driven by a mean effective pressure of 70 kilopascals (10 psi). Its top speed is 20 revolutions per minute (rpm) of the flywheel. In the engine's youth, it had a maximum power output of approximately 26 kilowatts (35 hp). It underwent a series of alterations in 1795, converting it from single-acting to double-acting; it was alleged at the time that this conversion improved its power to 52 kilowatts (70 hp), but the Powerhouse Museum claims this is false. A centrifugal governor, which moderates the level of steam provided if the engine begins to overload was added some years after this, and beam and main driving rod, both originally of wood, were replaced in sand-cast iron.

Apart from its age, the engine is notable in that it embodies the four innovations which made Boulton & Watt's engines a significant driver of the Industrial Revolution. The first is a separate condenser, which increases the efficiency of the engine by allowing the main cylinder to remain hot at all times. The second is the parallel motion, which converts the up-and-down motion of the piston into the arcing motion of the beam, whilst maintaining a rigid connection. The rigid connection allowed the engine to be double-acting, meaning the piston could push as well as pull the beam. Third is the centrifugal governor, used to automatically regulate the speed of the engine. Finally the sun and planet gear convert the reciprocating motion of the beam into a rotating motion, which can be used to drive rotating machinery.

== Cultural references ==
The engine is featured on the Bank of England £50 note along with Matthew Boulton, James Watt, and the Soho Manufactory.

== See also ==
- Murray's Hypocycloidal Engine – the oldest working engine with a hypocycloidal gear
