= Charlotte Matthews =

British businesswoman (1759–1802)

- Born: Charlotte Marlar; 1759; London
- Died: 9 January 1802 (aged 42–43)
- Occupations: banker and businessperson
- Employer: self
- Known for: woman member of Lloyd's of London
- Spouse: William Matthews
- Children: none

Charlotte Matthews (born Charlotte Marlar; 1759 – 9 January 1802) was a British businesswoman who was a member of Lloyd's of London and a banker. She was a close business associate of Boulton and Watt.

== Life ==
Matthews was born in London as Charlotte Marlar, the daughter of Ann and John Marlar. Her father was a merchant and banker and she was baptised at All-Hallows-the-Great in London on 23 March 1759. She had an elder sibling and in time four more were born. There is no detail of her education but she was known to be literate. A John Marlar is surmised to have owned a book collection which included a book printed by Caxton in 1481. On 1 August 1776 she was at Monken Hadley where she married William Matthews.

Her father died in 1791 and her husband followed in 1792. They had no children and she had become very involved with her husband's business before he died. She had obtained enough experience and training to continue to organise his business. Her husband had been a member of Lloyd's of London and as his widow and business executive she was also elected a member. The most notable of his customers had been the Matthew Boulton and James Watt partnership. Like her husband she corresponded with Matthew Boulton and she would take a holiday at his house each year. The business between them was based on trust and their business borrowed thousands of pounds with no security or contract being recorded. She inherited two clerks, John Woodward and John Mosley, and a counting house where she would work a long day which included walking to meetings to discuss business. She sold her husband's house and moved to live in the Fenchurch Street area where she also had an office. The business also changed as she specialised in banking, bill discounting and insurance where membership of Lloyds was important. Her support of Boulton and Watt is thought to have been essential to their business (and is evidenced in surviving correspondence, such as that between Matthew Boulton and Thomas Wilson (c. 1748–1820), agent for Boulton and Watt in Cornwall). Mrs Matthews received money on their behalf and advised them about potential businesspeople and kept them aware of markets and current events.

The value of their business is evidenced by Boulton taking on the manufacture of copper coinage and when the coins were ready, they put into circulation, via their mint and her premises in London.

== Death and legacy ==
In 1802 she died after a short illness aged 43, and she was buried on 16 January 1802 at Croydon Minster. She left an estate valued at £5,000 to her nieces, nephews and sisters. At some time her body was moved elsewhere. After she died her business was taken over by the families of Watt and Boulton named M. and R. Boulton, J. and G. Watt, and Company. The Boultons owned two thirds of this company and the Watts owned the remaining third. Her house, Croydon Lodge, was bought by Thomas Bainbridge (1749-1830).
