= James Pickard =

James Pickard was an English inventor. He modified the Newcomen engine in a manner that it could deliver a rotary motion. His solution, which he patented in 1780, involved the combined use of a crank and a flywheel.

James Watt's company Boulton and Watt circumvented Pickard's patent, with an invention of their employee William Murdoch, the so-called sun and planet gear, patented by Watt in 1781.
