= Birmingham toy industry =

The toy industry in Birmingham (and some other areas) was an economic sector that produced small goods in any material. Edmund Burke described Birmingham in Parliament in 1777 as "the great Toy Shop of Europe".

Hinges, buttons, belt buckles, and hooks are all examples of goods that were once considered "toys" and could be produced in metal, leather, or glass, amongst others. The term toy was used starting in the 18th century or earlier to describe the industry in the English Midlands, and changed to its modern form "toy" (as in plaything) years later. The metalworking legacy still exists in the form of Birmingham's Jewellery Quarter.

Although the toy industry tended to be based on small cottage manufactories at first, the rise of the middle class in London created a demand that led to the rapid expansion of the industry in the mid-18th century. At this point economies of scale started to come into effect, and a number of very large manufactories were built, leading to the common use of the term "factory". These factories typically had a number of designers that could be called on for any sort of work, while different parts of the building were dedicated to mass production of different sorts of goods. These early factories were an early step on the road to the assembly line, and an important factor in the creation of the Industrial Revolution.

One major entrepreneur in the toy industry was Matthew Boulton. In 1760, he described the Birmingham buckle trade to a House of Commons select committee, estimating that at least 8,000 were employed, generating £300,000 worth of business, with the majority being for export to Europe. In 1766, Boulton completed his "model manufactory" called Soho Manufactory near Birmingham, powered by a waterwheel, employing one thousand workers. Soho produced high-quality buckles, buttons, boxes, trinkets in steel, gold, sterling silver, goods of ormolu and Sheffield plate.

== Range of products ==
In 1767, Sketchley's Directory outlined the range of products that fell under the designation of "toys":

We shall here observe that these Artists are divided into several Branches as the Gold and Silver Toy Makers, who make Trinkets, Seals, Tweezers and Tooth Pick Cases, Smelling Bottles, Snuff Boxes, and Filegree Work, such as Toilets, Tea Chests, Inkstands &c &c. The Tortoiseshell Toy maker, makes a beautiful variety of the above and other articles; as does also the Steel; who make Cork Screws, Buckles, Draw and other Boxes; Snuffers, Watch Chains, Stay Hooks, Sugar Knippers &c. and almost all these are likewise made in various metals.

In 1833, John Holland drew a distinction between Birmingham's manufacture of "heavy steel toys" and "light steel toys". The "heavy steel toys" he compared and contrasted with the "tools" made in Lancashire:

By this not very appropriate description ["heavy steel toys"] the Birmingham manufacturers refer to a class of articles, differing but little, in most respects, from those last mentioned [Lancashire "tools"]. Instead, however, of being formed with such admirable symmetry, and exhibiting such rare workmanship as the former, these rather appear like cheap imitations of the articles with which they may be directly compared. Instead, too, of being got up black, as is the case with the Lancashire articles, these Birmingham goods are filed bright, and slightly burnished. To enumerate all the "toys" of this class would be to transcribe a large list of miscellaneous cheap and useful wares, from a joiner's hammer to a shoemaker's tack. The pincers of the last-named workman, and the edged nippers commonly in use for breaking up loaf-sugar, are both of them well-known specimens of the extensive manufacture now adverted to; they exhibit, likewise, in the jointing – which, however, is perfect enough for the purpose intended – a striking contrast with that close fitting which is so much admired in such of the Lancashire tools as operate on a similar principle.

Of "light steel toys", Holland wrote:

Birmingham has long been noted for the superiority of its workmen in the production of an endless variety of steel trinkets, for which this country was formerly indebted to Milan, Berlin, and other foreign marts. As in the manufacture of the greater part of the articles, properly ranking under the foregoing denomination, the worth of the material constitutes but a very small fraction of the ultimate value, the expenditure of ingenuity and workmanship constituting the remainder, it is the policy of the state no less than the interest of the artisan to encourage the home production of this description of wares.

== Sources ==
- Upton, Chris (1993). A History of Birmingham. Chichester: Phillimore. ISBN 0-85033-870-0.
