= James Watt =

Scottish inventor, engineer and chemist (1736–1819)

James Watt FRS FRSE
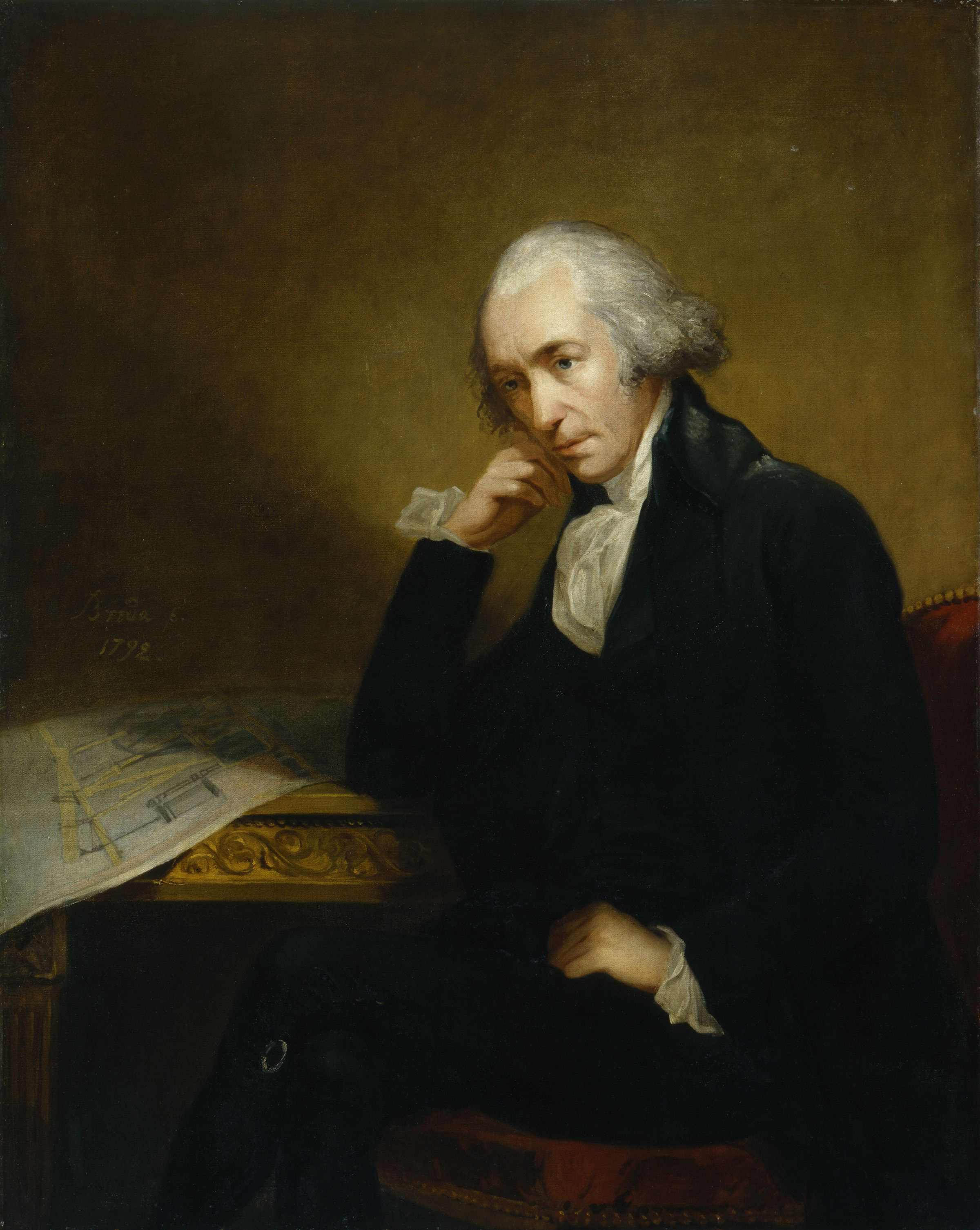
- Portrait by Carl Frederik von Breda, 1792
- Born: 19 January 1736; Greenock, Renfrewshire, Scotland
- Died: 25 August 1819 (aged 83) (Note: Although some otherwise reputable sources give his date of death as 19 August 1819, all contemporary accounts report him dying on 25 August and being buried on 2 September. The date 19 August originates from the biography The Life of James Watt (1858, p. 521) by James Patrick Muirhead. It draws its (supposed) legitimacy from the fact that Muirhead was a nephew of Watt and therefore should have been well-informed. In the Muirhead papers, 25 August date is mentioned elsewhere. The latter date is also given in contemporary newspaper reports (for example, page 3 of The Times of 28 August) as well as by an abstract of and codicil to Watt's last will. (In the pertinent burial register of St Mary's Church, Handsworth, Watt's date of death is not mentioned.)); Handsworth, Birmingham, England
- Resting place: St Mary's Church, Handsworth
- Known for: Watt steam engine Watt's linkage Watt's curve Separate condenser Centrifugal governor Horsepower; Indicator diagram Letter copying press Sun and planet gear
- Spouse(s): Margaret Miller (m. 1764–1773 her death) Anne McGrigor (m. 1776)
- Children: 4
- Scientific career
- Fields: Mechanical engineering
- Workplaces: University of Glasgow; Boulton and Watt

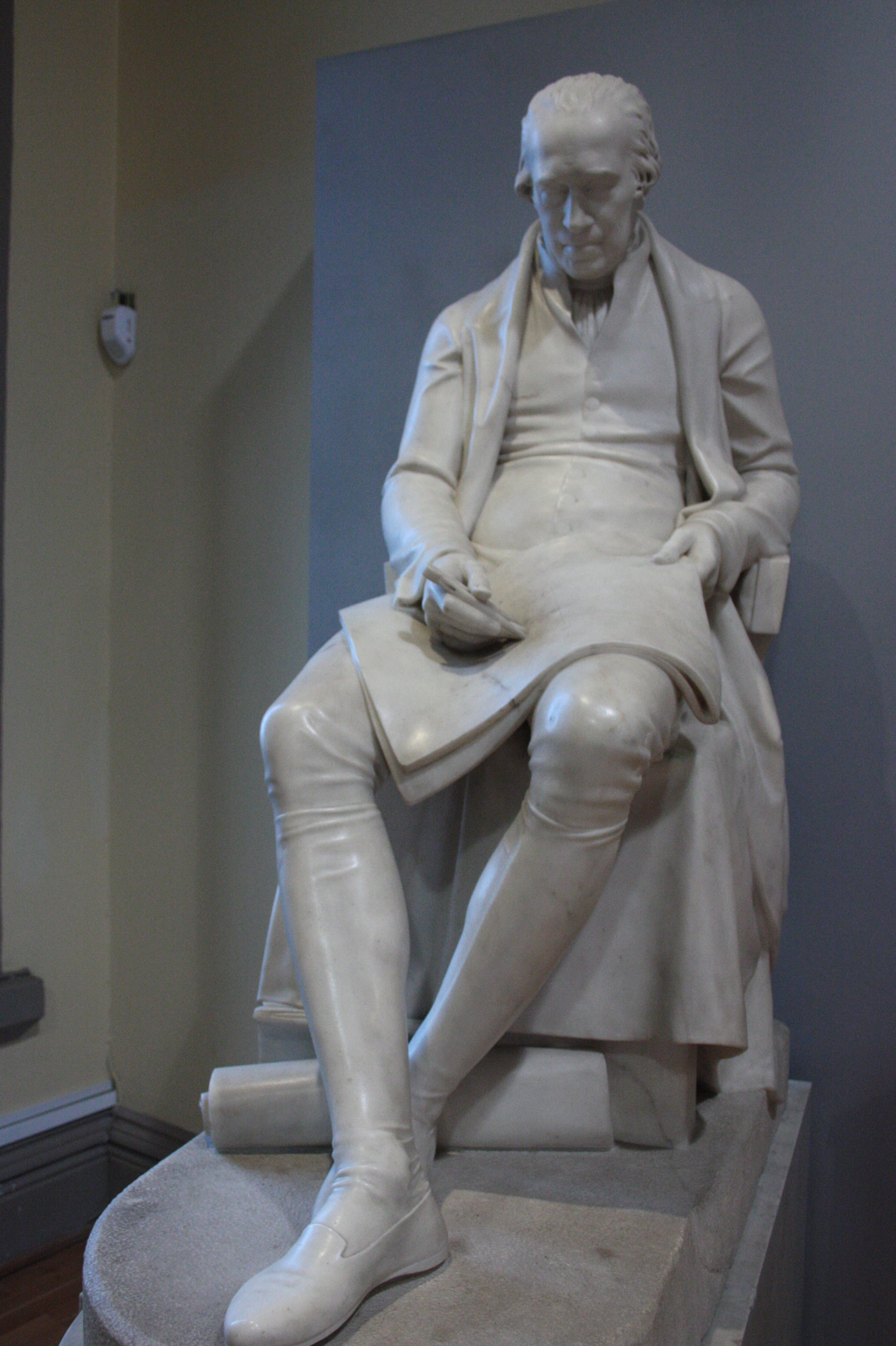
Statue of Watt (Hunterian Museum, Glasgow, by Francis Chantrey)

James Watt (/wɒt/; 30 January 1736 (19 January 1736 OS) – 25 August 1819) was a Scottish inventor, engineer and chemist who improved on Thomas Newcomen's 1712 Newcomen steam engine with his Watt steam engine in 1776, which was fundamental to the changes brought by the Industrial Revolution in both his native Great Britain and the rest of the world.

While working as an instrument maker at the University of Glasgow, Watt became interested in the technology of steam engines. At the time engineers such as John Smeaton were aware of the inefficiencies of Newcomen's engine and aimed to improve it. Watt's insight was to realise that contemporary engine designs wasted a great deal of energy by repeatedly cooling and reheating the cylinder. Watt introduced a design enhancement, the separate condenser, which avoided this waste of energy and radically improved the power, efficiency, and cost-effectiveness of steam engines. Eventually, he adapted his engine to produce rotary motion, greatly broadening its use beyond pumping water.

Watt attempted to commercialise his invention, but experienced great financial difficulties until he entered a partnership with Matthew Boulton in 1775. The new firm of Boulton and Watt was eventually highly successful and Watt became a wealthy man. In his retirement, Watt continued to develop new inventions though none was as significant as his steam engine work.

As Watt developed the concept of horsepower, the SI unit of power, the watt, was named after him.

== Biography ==
=== Early life and education ===
James Watt was born on 19 January 1736 in Greenock, Renfrewshire, the eldest of the five surviving children of Agnes Muirhead (1703–1755) and James Watt (1698–1782). Watt was baptised on 25 January 1736 at Old West Kirk, in Greenock. His mother came from a distinguished family, was well educated and said to be of forceful character, while his father was a shipwright, ship owner and contractor, and served as the Greenock's chief baillie in 1751. The Watt family's wealth came in part from Watt's father's trading in slaves and slave-produced goods. Watt's parents were Presbyterians and strong Covenanters, but despite his religious upbringing he later became a deist. Watt's grandfather, Thomas Watt (1642–1734), was a teacher of mathematics, surveying and navigation and baillie to the Baron of Cartsburn.

Initially, Watt was educated at home by his mother, later going on to attend Greenock Grammar School. There he exhibited an aptitude for mathematics, while Latin and Greek failed to interest him.

Watt is said to have suffered prolonged bouts of ill-health as a child and from frequent headaches all his life.

After leaving school, Watt worked in the workshops of his father's businesses, demonstrating considerable dexterity and skill in creating engineering models. After his father suffered unsuccessful business ventures, Watt left Greenock to seek employment in Glasgow as a mathematical instrument maker.

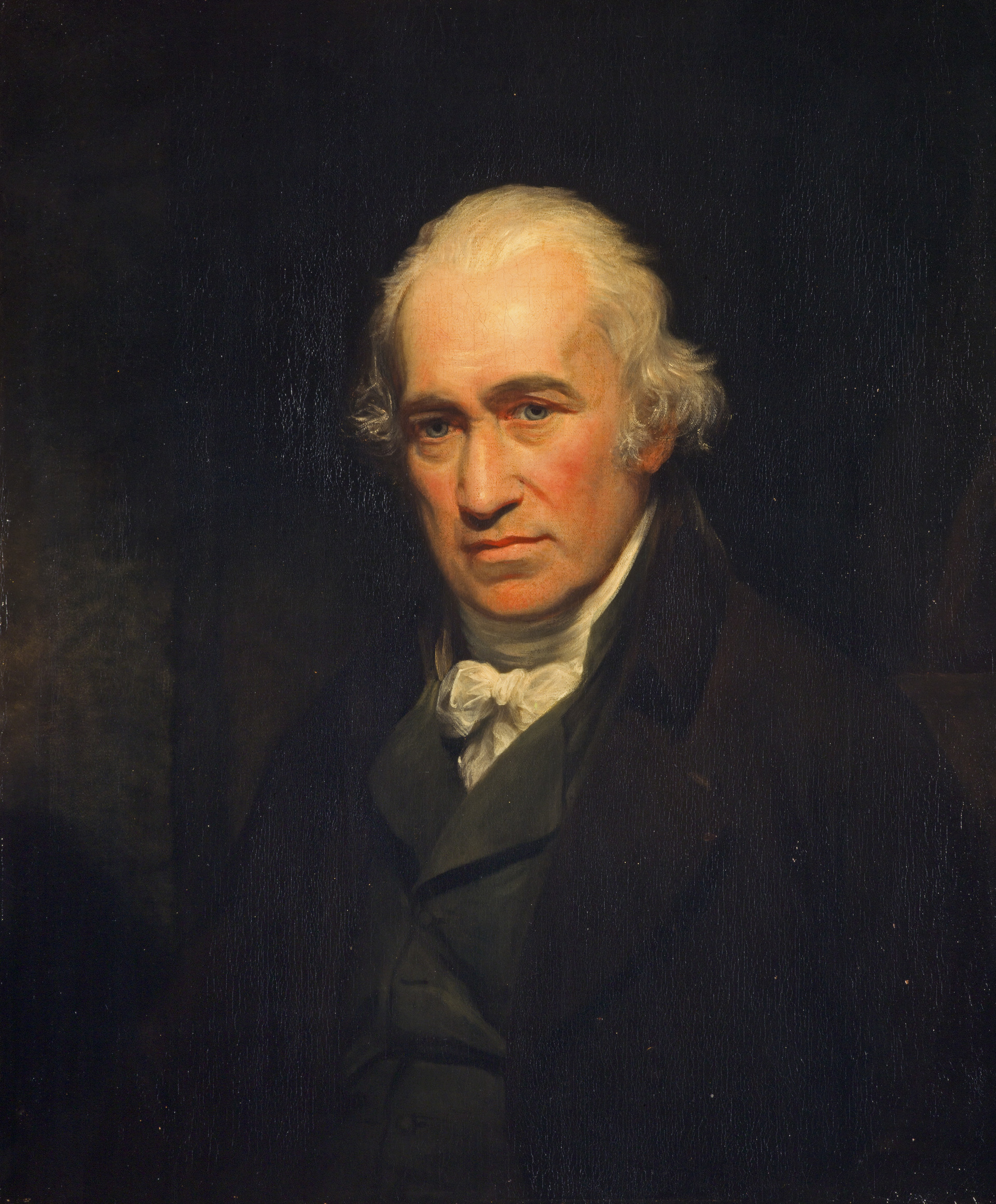
James Watt by John Partridge, after Sir William Beechey (1806)

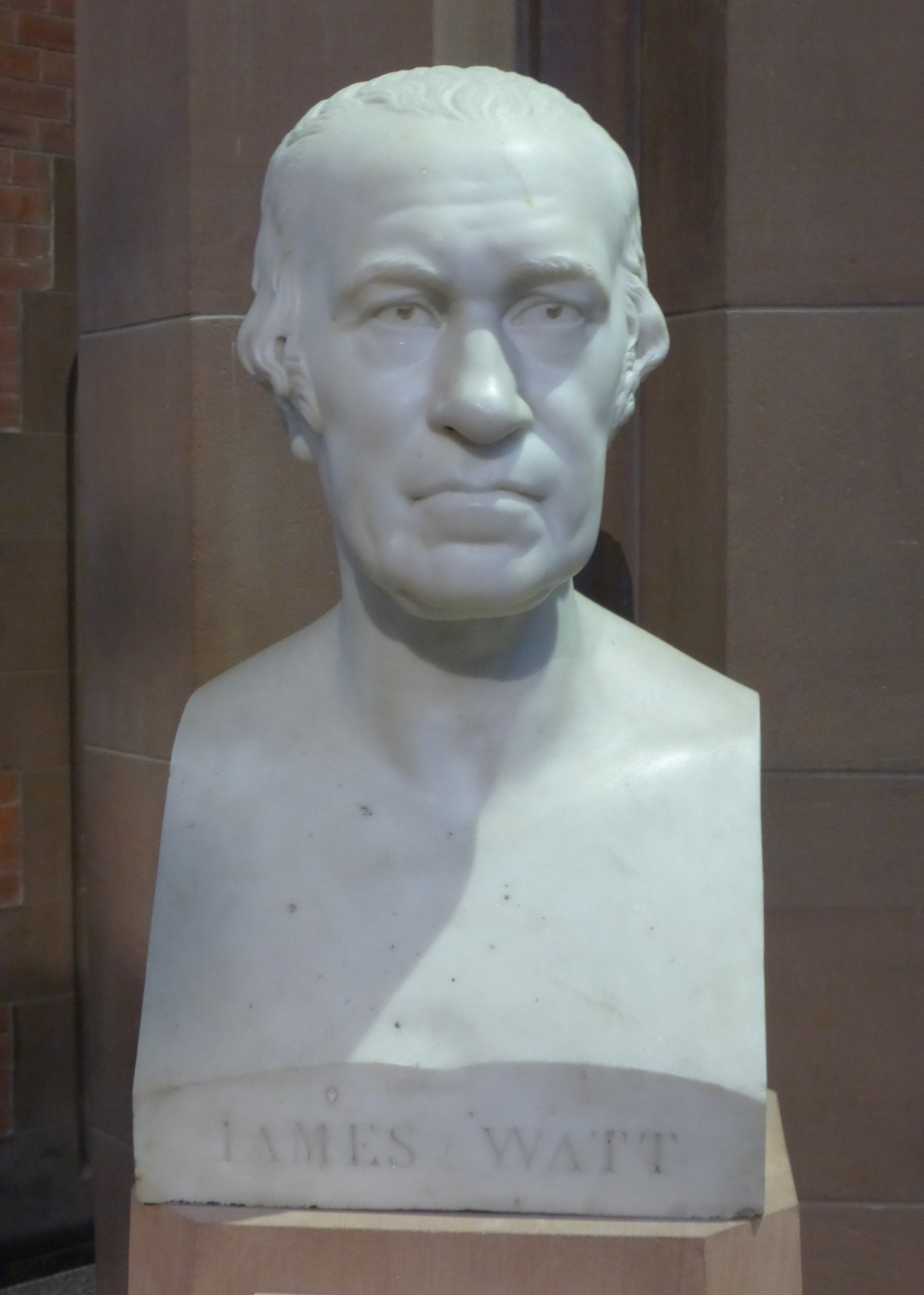
Bust of Watt in the Scottish National Portrait Gallery

When he was 18, Watt's mother died and his father's health began to fail. Watt travelled to London and was able to obtain a period of training as an instrument maker for a year (1755–56), then returned to Scotland, settling in the major commercial city of Glasgow, intent on setting up his own instrument-making business. He was still very young and, having not had a full apprenticeship, did not have the usual connections via a former master to establish himself as a journeyman instrument maker.

Watt was saved from this impasse by the arrival from Jamaica of astronomical instruments bequeathed by Alexander MacFarlane to the University of Glasgow – instruments that required expert attention. Watt restored them to working order and was remunerated. These instruments were eventually installed in the Macfarlane Observatory. Subsequently, three professors offered him the opportunity to set up a small workshop within the university. It was initiated in 1757 and two of the professors, the physicist and chemist Joseph Black as well as the famed economist Adam Smith, became Watt's friends.

At first, he worked on maintaining and repairing scientific instruments used in the university, helping with demonstrations, and expanding the production of quadrants. He made and repaired brass reflecting quadrants, parallel rulers, scales, parts for telescopes, and barometers, among other things.

Biographers such as Samuel Smiles assert that Watt struggled to establish himself in Glasgow due to opposition from the Trades House, but this has been disputed by other historians, such as Harry Lumsden. The records from this period are fragmentary, but while it is clear that Watt encountered opposition, he was nevertheless able to work and trade as a skilled metal worker, suggesting that the Incorporation of Hammermen were satisfied that he met their requirements for membership, or that Watt managed to avoid their outright opposition.

In 1759, he formed a partnership with John Craig, an architect and businessman, to manufacture and sell a line of products including musical instruments and toys. This partnership lasted for the next six years, and employed up to 16 workers. Craig died in 1765. One employee, Alex Gardner, eventually took over the business, which lasted into the 20th century.

In 1764, Watt married his cousin Margaret (Peggy) Miller, with whom he had 5 children, 2 of whom lived to adulthood: James Jr. (1769–1848) and Margaret (1767–1796). His wife died in childbirth in 1773. In 1777, he married again, to Ann MacGregor, daughter of a Glasgow dye-maker, with whom he had 2 children: Gregory (1777–1804), who became a geologist and mineralogist, and Janet (1779–1794). Ann died in 1832. Between 1777 and 1790 he lived in Regent Place, Birmingham.

== Scientific studies and inventions ==
=== Watt and the kettle ===
There is a popular story that Watt was inspired to invent the steam engine by seeing a kettle boiling, the steam forcing the lid to rise and thus showing Watt the power of steam. This story is told in many forms; in some Watt is a young lad, in others he is older, sometimes it's his mother's kettle, sometimes his aunt's, suggesting that it may be apocryphal. In any event, Watt did not invent the steam engine, but significantly improved the efficiency of the existing Newcomen engine by adding a separate condenser, consistent with the now-familiar principles of thermal efficiency. The story was possibly created by Watt's son, James Watt, Jr., who was determined to preserve and embellish his father's legacy. In this light, it can be seen as akin to the story of Isaac Newton and the falling apple and his discovery of gravity.

Although likely a myth, the story of Watt and the kettle has a basis in fact. In trying to understand the thermodynamics of heat and steam, James Watt carried out many laboratory experiments and his diaries record that in conducting these, he used a kettle as a boiler to generate steam.

=== Early experiments with steam ===
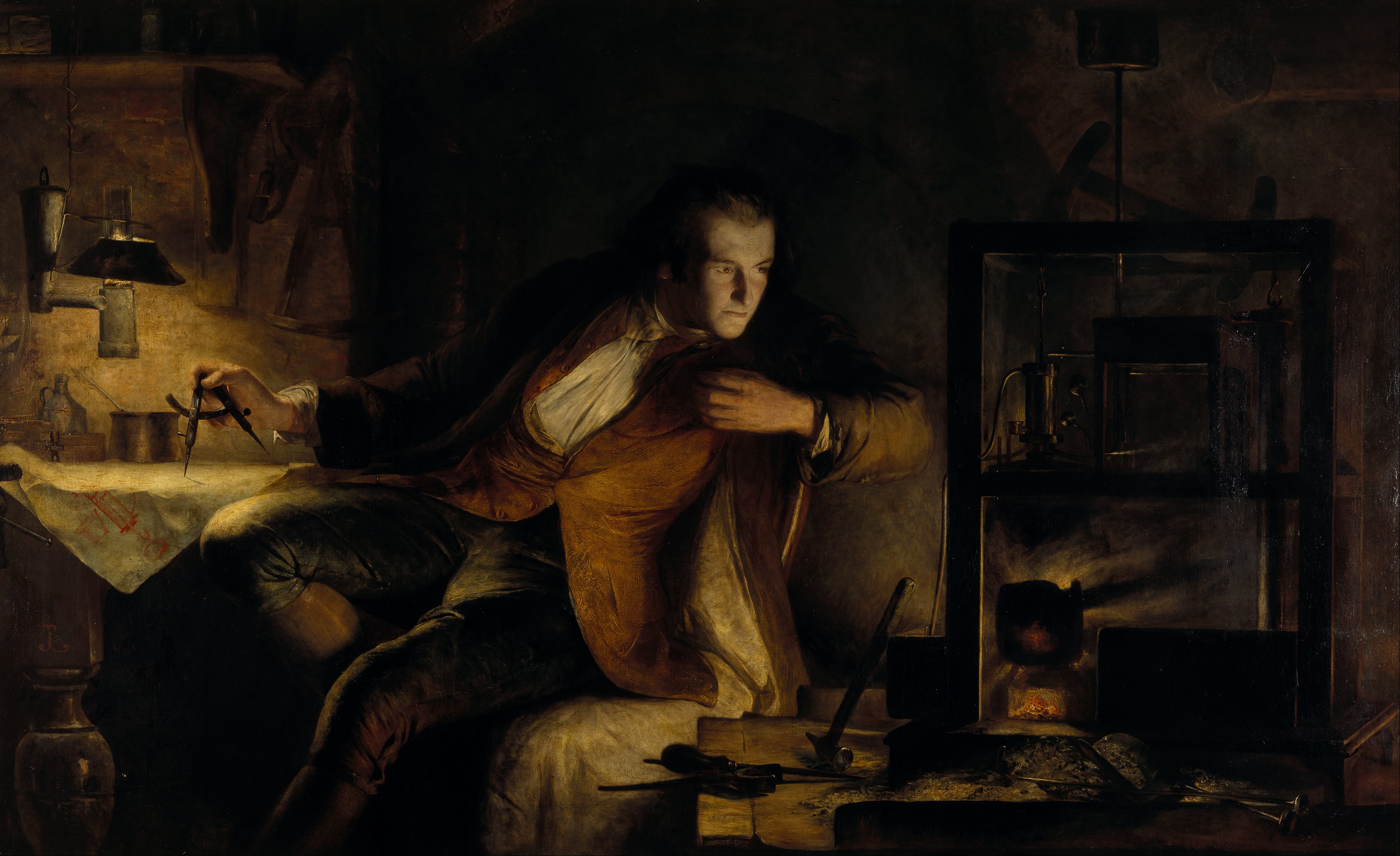
James Eckford Lauder: James Watt and the Steam Engine: the Dawn of the Nineteenth Century, 1855

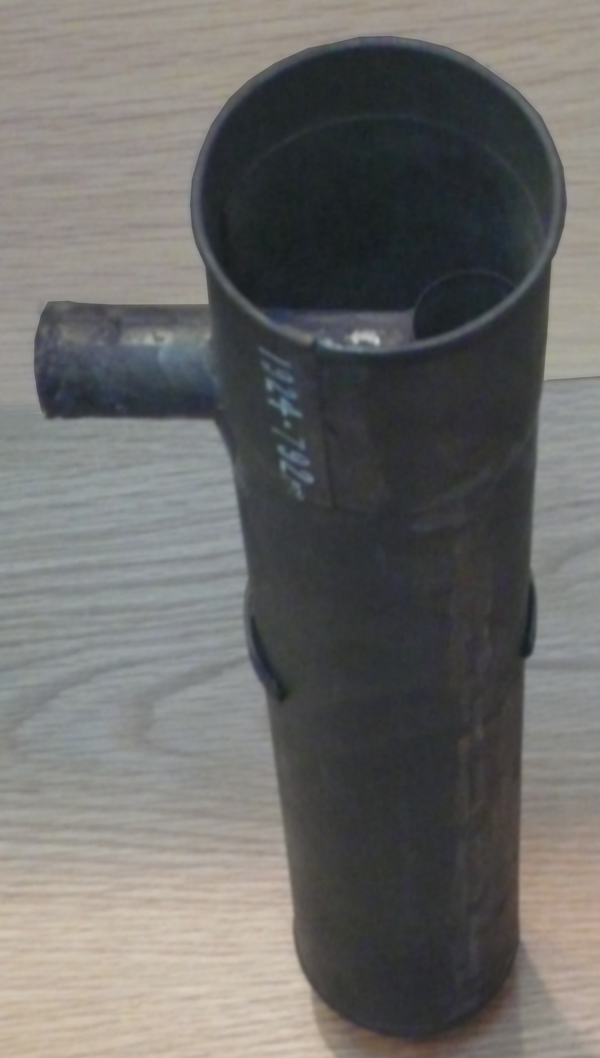
Original condenser by Watt (Science Museum)

In 1759 Watt's friend John Robison called his attention to the use of steam as a source of motive power. The design of the Newcomen engine, in use for almost 50 years for pumping water from mines, had hardly changed from its first implementation. Watt began to experiment with steam, though he had never seen an operating steam engine. He tried constructing a model; it failed to work satisfactorily, but he continued his experiments and began to read everything he could about the subject. He came to realise the importance of latent heat—the thermal energy released or absorbed during a constant-temperature process—in understanding the engine, which, unknown to Watt, his friend Joseph Black had previously discovered years before. Understanding of the steam engine was in a very primitive state, for the science of thermodynamics would not be formalised for nearly another 100 years.

In 1763, Watt was asked to repair a model Newcomen engine belonging to the university. Even after repair, the engine barely worked. After much experimentation, Watt demonstrated that about three-quarters of the thermal energy of the steam was being consumed in heating the engine cylinder on every cycle. This energy was wasted because, later in the cycle, cold water was injected into the cylinder to condense the steam to reduce its pressure. Thus, by repeatedly heating and cooling the cylinder, the engine wasted most of its thermal energy rather than converting it into mechanical energy.

Watt's critical insight, arrived at in May 1765 as he crossed Glasgow Green park, was to cause the steam to condense in a separate chamber apart from the piston, and to maintain the temperature of the cylinder at the same temperature as the injected steam by surrounding it with a "steam jacket". Thus, very little energy was absorbed by the cylinder on each cycle, making more available to perform useful work. Watt had a working model later that same year.

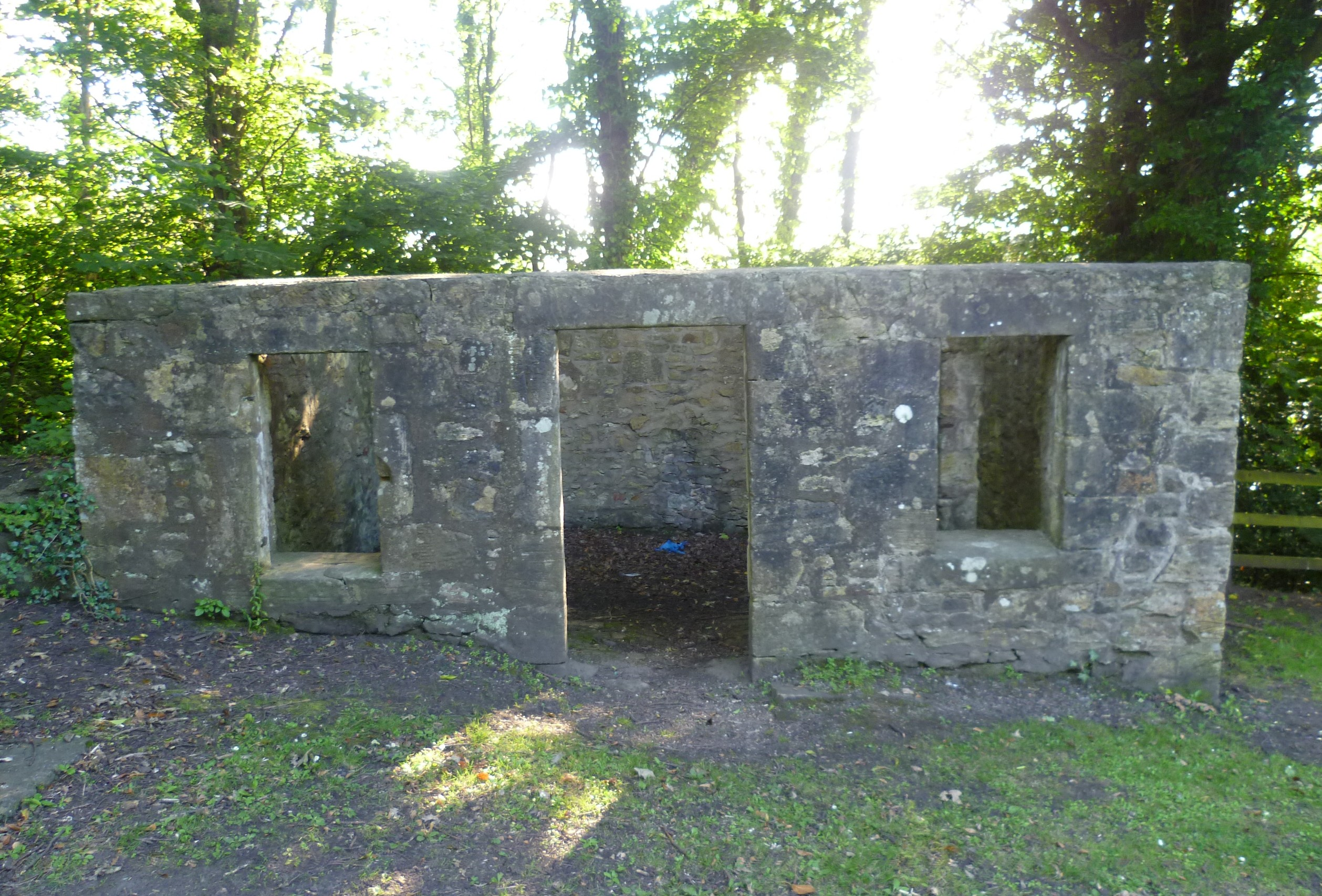
The ruin of Watt's cottage workshop at Kinneil House

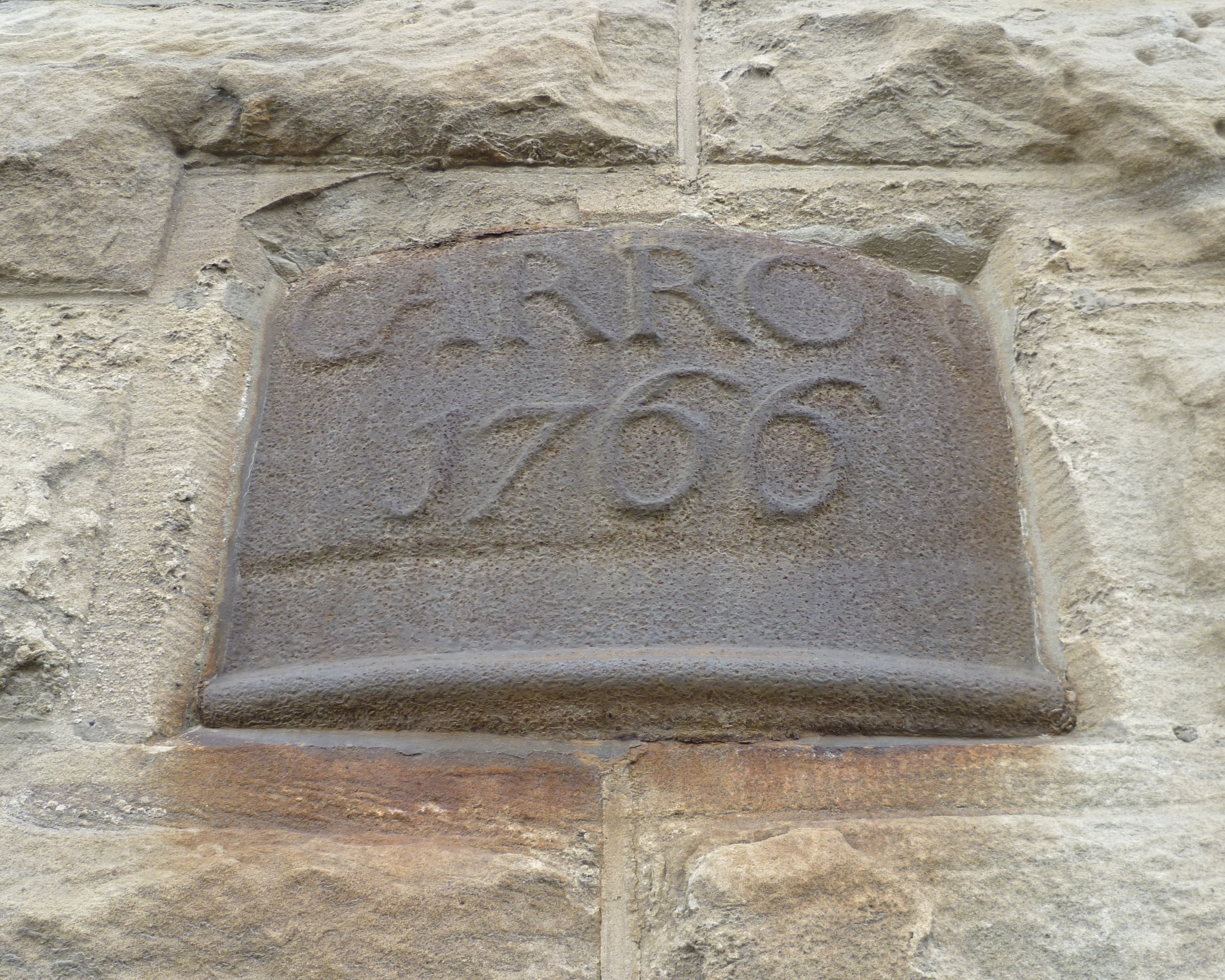
Cylinder fragment of Watt's first operational engine at the Carron Works, Falkirk

Despite a potentially workable design, there were still substantial difficulties in constructing a full-scale engine. This required more capital, some of which came from Black. More substantial backing came from John Roebuck, the founder of the celebrated Carron Iron Works near Falkirk, with whom he now formed a partnership. Roebuck lived at Kinneil House in Bo'ness, during which time Watt worked at perfecting his steam engine in a cottage adjacent to the house. The shell of the cottage, and a very large part of one of his projects, still exist to the rear.

The principal difficulty was in machining the piston and cylinder. The ironmasters at Coalbrookdale had cast and bored cylinders for Newcomen engines for decades, but a cylinder procured from them by William Small for the Kinneil engine proved unsatisfactory. Watt's engine needed a piston that was air tight, whereas Newcomen engines used a little water above the piston, so the seal only had to be water tight. Much capital was spent in pursuing a patent on Watt's invention. Strapped for resources, Watt was forced to take up employment—first as a surveyor, then as a civil engineer—for 8 years.

Roebuck went bankrupt, and Matthew Boulton, who owned the Soho Manufactory works near Birmingham, acquired his patent rights. An extension of the patent to 1800 was successfully obtained in 1775. (Note: James Watt's Fire Engines Patent Act 1775 (15 Geo. 3. c. 61). At the time, an Act of Parliament was required to extend a patent.)

Through Boulton, Watt finally had access to some of the best iron workers in the world. The difficulty of the manufacture of a large cylinder with a tightly fitting piston was solved by John Wilkinson, who had developed precision boring techniques for cannon making at Bersham, near Wrexham, North Wales. Watt and Boulton formed a hugely successful partnership, Boulton and Watt, which lasted for the next 25 years.

=== First engines ===
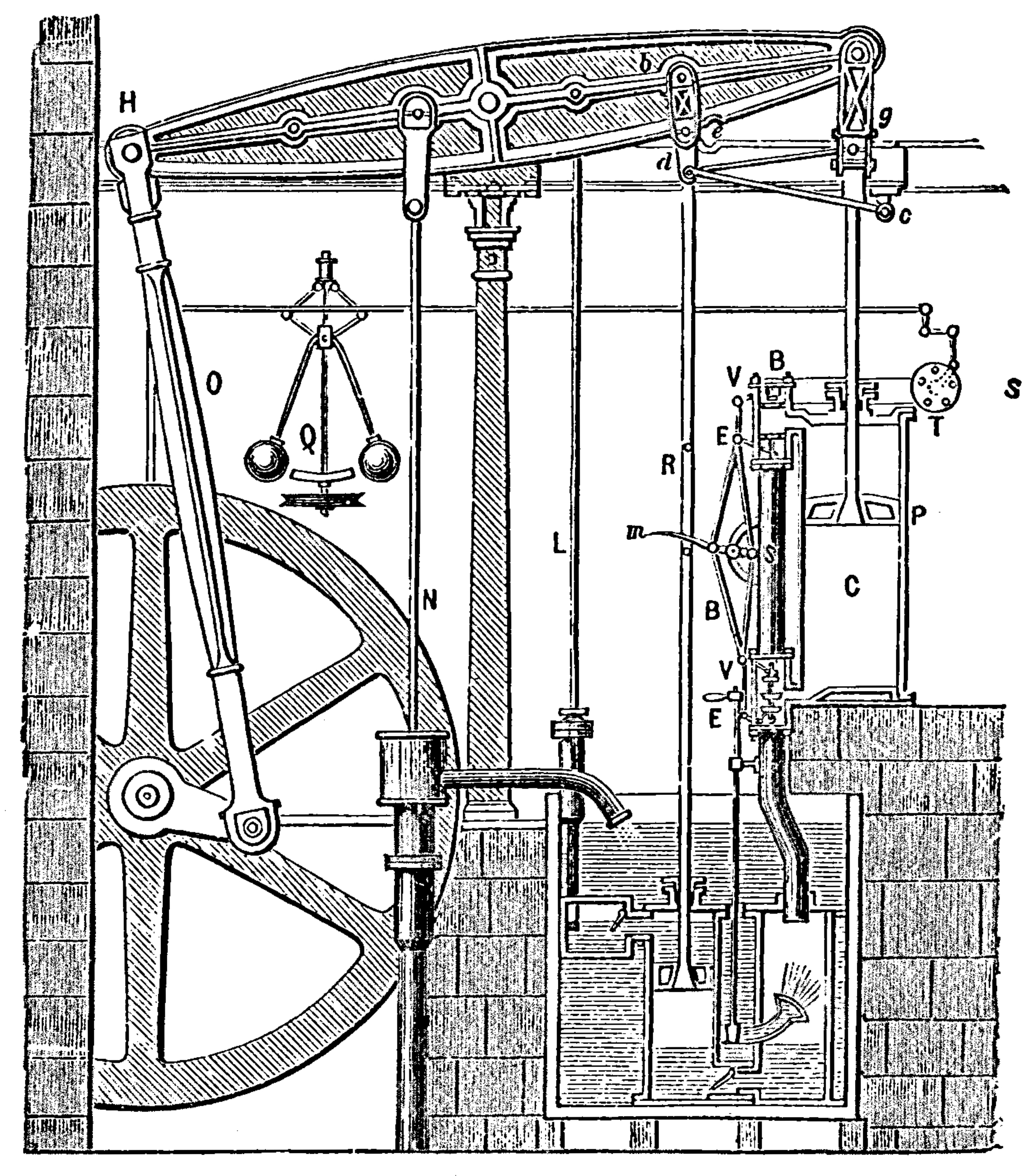
Engraving of a 1784 steam engine designed by Boulton and Watt

In 1776, the first engines were installed and working in commercial enterprises. These first engines were used to power pumps and produced only reciprocating motion to move the pump rods at the bottom of the shaft. The design was commercially successful, and for the next five years, Watt was very busy installing more engines, mostly in Cornwall, for pumping water out of mines.

Boulton and Watt did not have their own foundry until Soho foundry opened in 1795, so the main castings and cylinders were made by others according to drawings made by Watt, who served in the role of consulting engineer. The erection of the engine and its shakedown was supervised by Watt, at first, and then by men in the firm's employ, with the actual work being accomplished by the purchaser of the engine. Supervising erectors included at various times William Murdoch, John Rennie, William Playfair, John Southern, Logan Henderson, James Lawson, William Brunton, Isaac Perrins, and others.

These were large machines. The first, for example, had a cylinder with a diameter of 50 inches and an overall height of about 24 feet, and required the construction of a dedicated building to house it. Boulton and Watt charged an annual payment, equal to one-third of the value of the coal saved in comparison to a Newcomen engine performing the same work.

The field of application for the invention was greatly widened when Boulton urged Watt to convert the reciprocating motion of the piston to produce rotational power for grinding, weaving and milling. Although a crank seemed the obvious solution to the conversion, Watt and Boulton were stymied by a patent for this, whose holder, James Pickard and his associates proposed to cross-license the external condenser. Watt adamantly opposed this and they circumvented the patent by their sun and planet gear in 1781.

Over the next six years, he made other improvements and modifications to the steam engine. A double-acting engine, in which the steam acted alternately on both sides of the piston, was one. He described methods for working the steam "expansively" (i.e., using steam at pressures well above atmospheric). A compound engine, which connected two or more engines, was described. Two more patents were granted for these in 1781 and 1782. Numerous other improvements that made for easier manufacture and installation were continually implemented. One of these included the use of the steam indicator which produced an informative plot of the pressure in the cylinder against its volume, which he kept as a trade secret. Another important invention, one which Watt was most proud of, was the parallel motion linkage, which was essential in double-acting engines as it produced the straight line motion required for the cylinder rod and pump, from the connected rocking beam, whose end moves in a circular arc. This was patented in 1784. A throttle valve to control the power of the engine, and a centrifugal governor, patented in 1788, to keep it from "running away" were very important. These improvements taken together produced an engine which was up to five times as fuel efficient as the Newcomen engine.

Because of the danger of exploding boilers, which were in a very primitive stage of development, and the ongoing issues with leaks, Watt restricted his use of high pressure steam – all of his engines used steam at near atmospheric pressure.

=== Patent trials ===
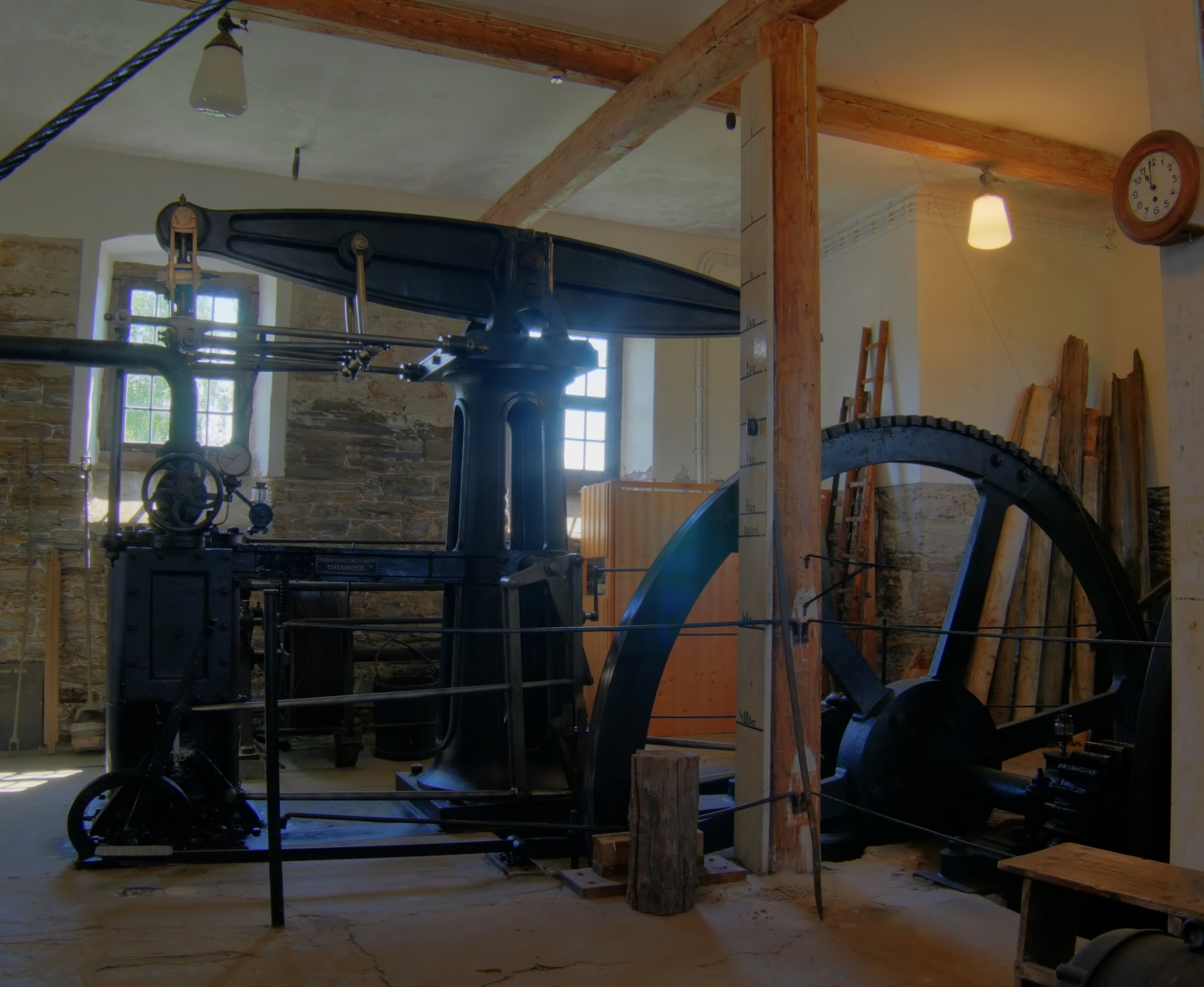
A steam engine built to James Watt's patent in 1848 at Freiberg in Germany

Edward Bull started constructing engines for Boulton and Watt in Cornwall in 1781. By 1792, he had started making engines of his own design that contained a separate condenser, thereby infringing Watt's patents. Two brothers, Jabez Carter Hornblower and Jonathan Hornblower Junior, also began building engines about the same time. Others began to modify Newcomen engines by adding a condenser, and the mine owners in Cornwall became convinced that Watt's patent could not be enforced. They started to withhold payments to Boulton and Watt, which by 1795 had fallen on hard times. Of the total £21,000 (equivalent to £2,180,000 as of 2025) owed, only £2,500 had been received. Watt was forced to go to court to enforce his claims.

He first sued Bull in 1793. The jury found for Watt, but the question of whether or not the original specification of the patent was valid was left to another trial. In the meantime, injunctions were issued against the infringers, forcing their payments of the royalties to be placed in escrow. The trial on determining the validity of the specifications which was held in the following year was inconclusive, but the injunctions remained in force and the infringers, except for Jonathan Hornblower, all began to settle their cases. Hornblower was soon brought to trial in 1799, and the verdict of the four was decisively in favour of Watt. Their friend John Wilkinson, who had solved the problem of boring an accurate cylinder, was a particularly grievous case. He had erected about 20 engines without Boulton's and Watts' knowledge. They finally agreed to settle the infringement in 1796. Boulton and Watt never collected all that was owed them, but the disputes were all settled directly between the parties or through arbitration. These trials were extremely costly in both money and time, but ultimately were successful for the firm.

=== Copying machine ===
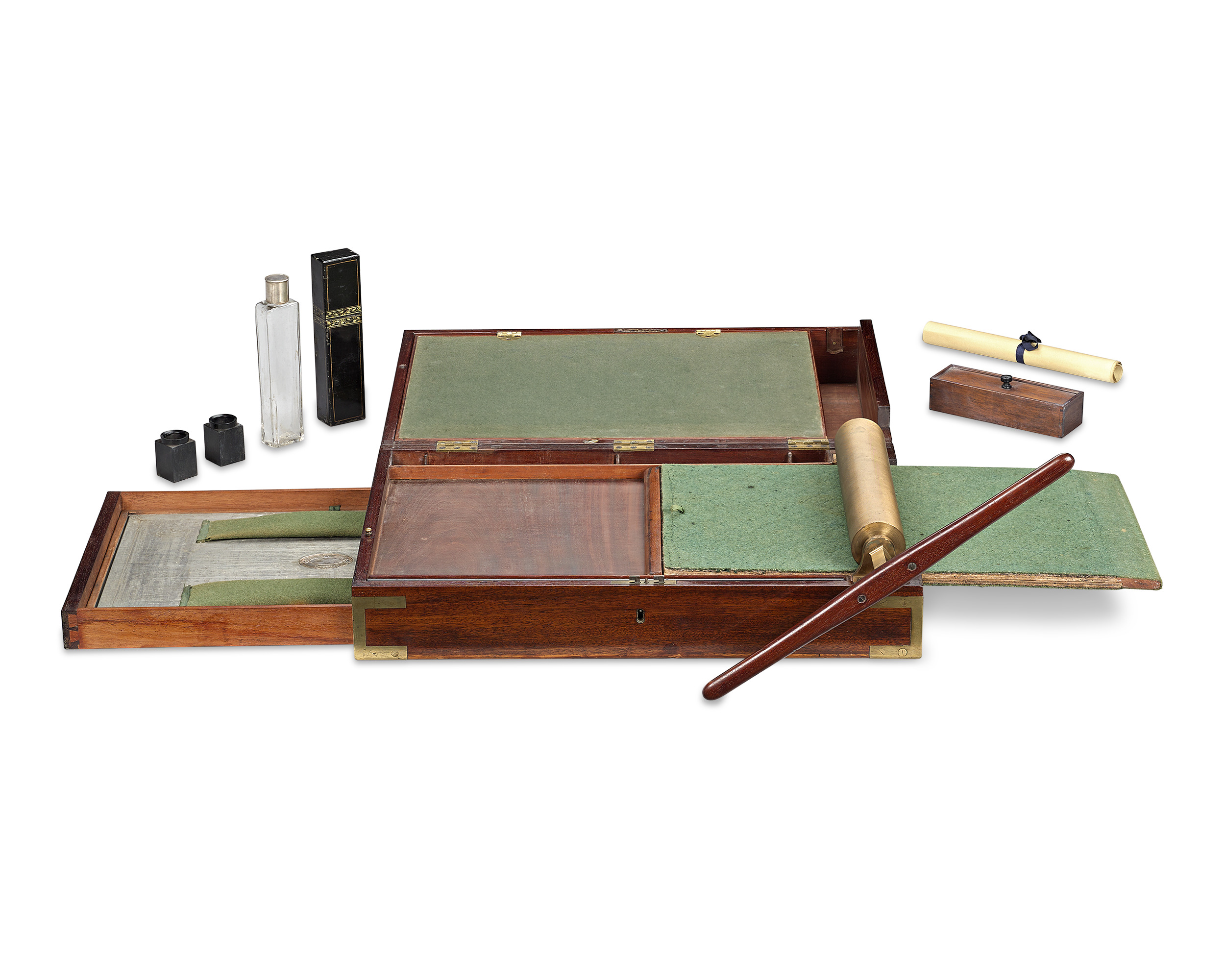
Portable Copying Machine by James Watt & Co. c. 1795

Before 1780, there was no good method for making copies of letters or drawings. The only method sometimes used was a mechanical one using multiple linked pens. Watt at first experimented with improving this method, but soon gave up on this approach because it was so cumbersome. He instead decided to try to physically transfer ink from the front of the original to the back of another sheet, moistened with a solvent, and pressed to the original. The second sheet had to be thin, so that the ink could be seen through it when the copy was held up to the light, thus reproducing the original exactly.

Watt started to develop the process in 1779, and made many experiments to formulate the ink, select the thin paper, to devise a method for wetting the special thin paper, and to make a press suitable for applying the correct pressure to effect the transfer. All of these required much experimentation, but he soon had enough success to patent the process a year later. Watt formed another partnership with Boulton (who provided financing) and James Keir (to manage the business) in a firm called James Watt and Co. The perfection of the invention required much more development work before it could be routinely used by others, but this was carried out over the next few years. Boulton and Watt gave up their shares to their sons in 1794. It became a commercial success and was widely used in offices even into the 20th century.

=== Chemical experiments ===
From an early age, Watt was very interested in chemistry. In late 1786, while in Paris, he witnessed an experiment by Claude Louis Berthollet in which he reacted hydrochloric acid with manganese dioxide to produce chlorine. He had already found that an aqueous solution of chlorine could bleach textiles, and had published his findings, which aroused great interest among many potential rivals. When Watt returned to Britain, he began experiments along these lines with hopes of finding a commercially viable process. He discovered that a mixture of salt, manganese dioxide and sulphuric acid could produce chlorine, which Watt believed might be a cheaper method. He passed the chlorine into a weak solution of alkali, and obtained a turbid solution that appeared to have good bleaching properties. He soon communicated these results to James McGrigor, his father-in-law, who was a bleacher in Glasgow. Otherwise, he tried to keep his method a secret.

With McGrigor and his wife Annie, he started to scale up the process, and in March 1788, McGrigor was able to bleach 1,500 yards (4,500 feet) of cloth to his satisfaction. About this time, Berthollet discovered the salt and sulphuric acid process, and published it, so it became public knowledge. Many others began to experiment with improving the process, which still had many shortcomings, not the least of which was the problem of transporting the liquid product. Watt's rivals soon overtook him in developing the process, and he dropped out of the race. It was not until 1799, when Charles Tennant patented a process for producing solid bleaching powder (calcium hypochlorite) that it became a commercial success.

By 1794, Watt had been chosen by Thomas Beddoes to manufacture apparatuses to produce, clean and store gases for use in the new Pneumatic Institution at Hotwells in Bristol. Watt continued to experiment with various gases, but by 1797, the medical uses for the "factitious airs" (artificial gases) had come to a dead end.

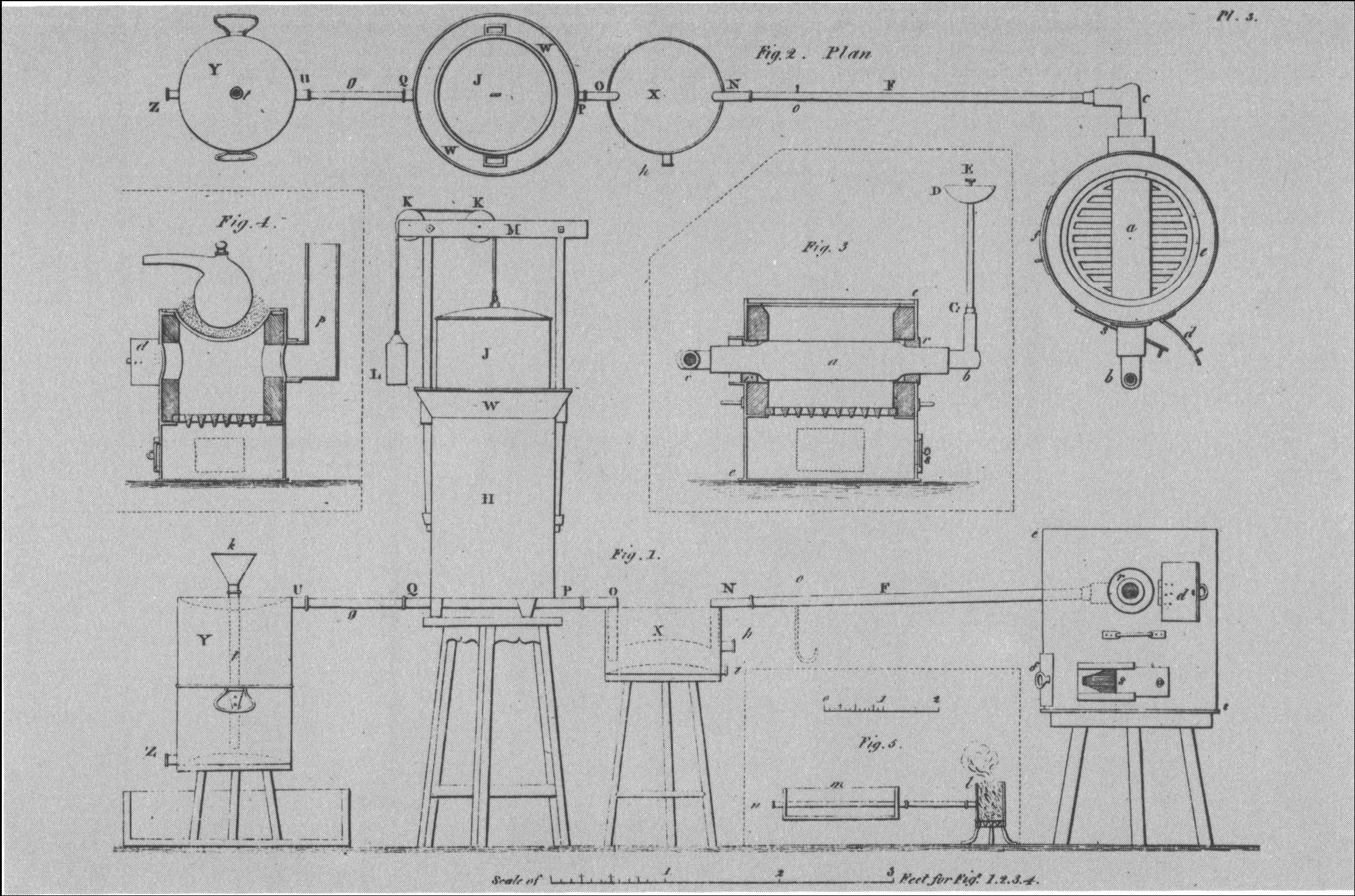
Scientific apparatus designed by Boulton and Watt in preparation of the Pneumatic Institution in Bristol

=== Personality ===
Watt combined theoretical knowledge of science with the ability to apply it practically. The chemist Humphry Davy said of him, "Those who consider James Watt only as a great practical mechanic form a very erroneous idea of his character; he was equally distinguished as a natural philosopher and a chemist, and his inventions demonstrate his profound knowledge of those sciences, and that peculiar characteristic of genius, the union of them for practical application".

He was greatly respected by other prominent men of the Industrial Revolution. He was an important member of the Lunar Society of Birmingham, and was a much sought-after conversationalist and companion, always interested in expanding his horizons. His personal relationships with his friends and business partners were always congenial and long-lasting.

According to Lord Liverpool (Prime Minister of the UK),

A more excellent and amiable man in all the relations of life I believe never existed.

Watt was a prolific correspondent. During his years in Cornwall, he wrote long letters to Boulton several times per week. He was averse to publishing his results in, for example, the Philosophical Transactions of the Royal Society however, and instead preferred to communicate his ideas in patents. He was an excellent draughtsman.

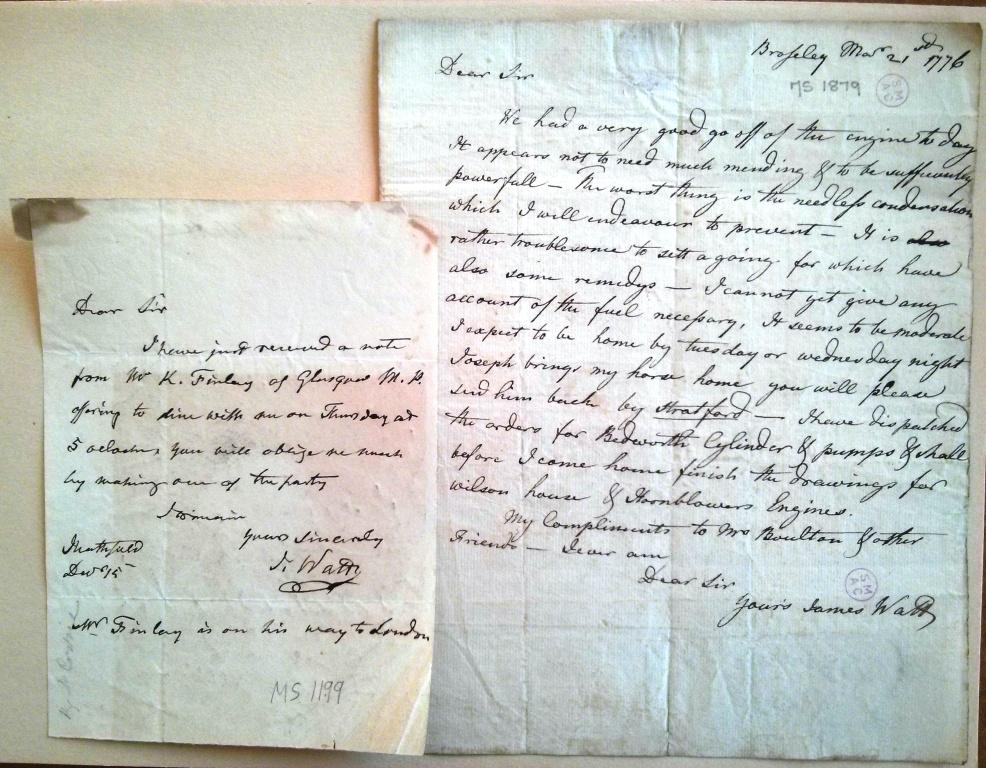
James Watt's letters from the Science Museum Library & Archives in Wroughton, near Swindon

He was a rather poor businessman, and especially hated bargaining and negotiating terms with those who sought to use the steam engine. In a letter to William Small in 1772, Watt confessed that "he would rather face a loaded cannon than settle an account or make a bargain." Until he retired, he was always very concerned about his financial affairs, and was something of a worrier. His health was often poor and he suffered frequent nervous headaches and depression. When he retired in 1800, he became a rich enough man to pass the business on to his sons.

=== Soho Foundry ===
At first, the partnership made the drawings and specifications for the engines, and supervised the work to erect them on the customers' property. They produced almost none of the parts themselves. Watt did most of his work at his home in Harper's Hill in Birmingham, while Boulton worked at the Soho Manufactory. Gradually, the partners began to actually manufacture more and more of the parts, and by 1795, they purchased a property about a mile away from the Soho Manufactory, on the banks of the Birmingham Canal, to establish a new foundry for the manufacture of the engines. The Soho Foundry formally opened in 1796 at a time when Watt's sons, Gregory and James Jr. were heavily involved in the management of the enterprise. In 1800, the year of Watt's retirement, the firm made a total of 41 engines.

=== Later years ===
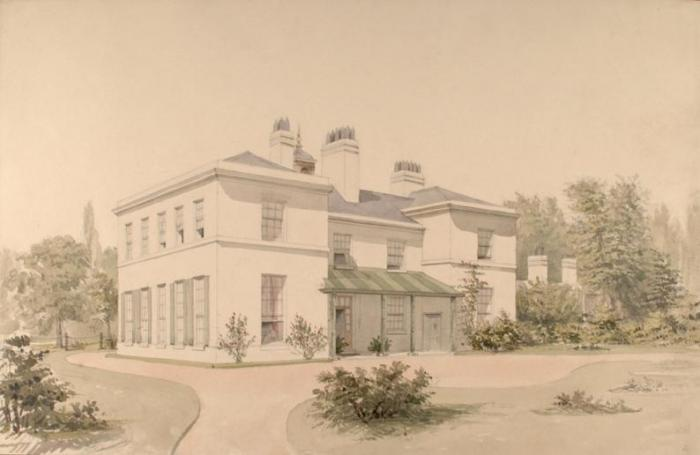
An 1835 painting of "Heathfield", Watt's house in Handsworth, by Allen Edward Everitt

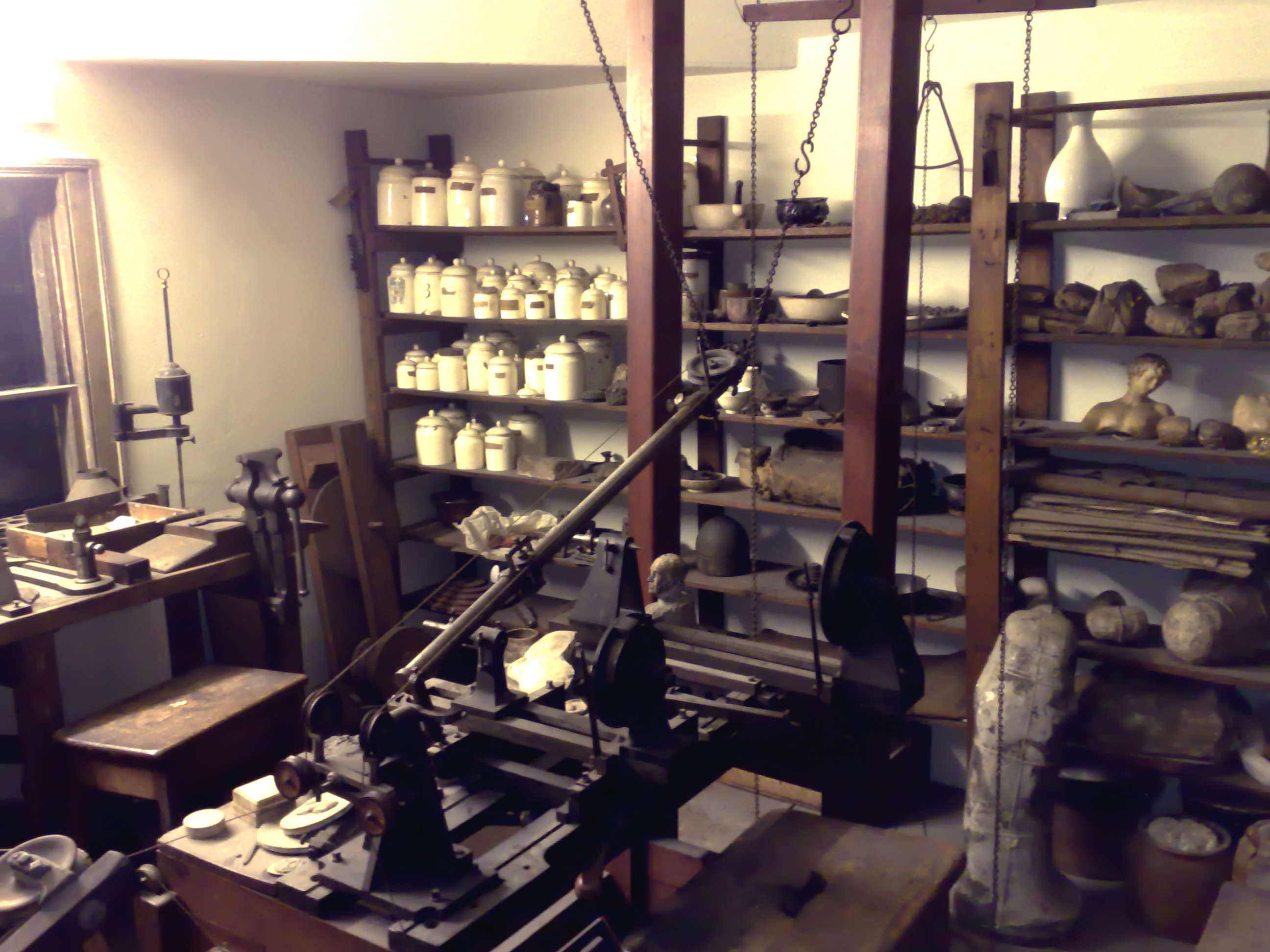
James Watt's workshop

Watt retired in 1800, the same year that his fundamental patent and partnership with Boulton expired. The famous partnership was transferred to the men's sons, Matthew Robinson Boulton and James Watt, Junior. The long-time firm engineer William Murdoch was soon made a partner and the firm prospered.

Watt continued to invent other things before and during his semi-retirement. Within his home in Handsworth, Staffordshire, Watt made use of a garret room as a workshop, and it was here that he worked on many of his inventions. Among other things, he invented and constructed machines for copying sculptures and medallions which worked very well, but which he never patented. One of the first sculptures he produced with the machine was a small head of his old professor friend Adam Smith. He maintained his interest in civil engineering and was a consultant on several significant projects. He proposed, for example, a method for constructing a flexible pipe to be used for pumping water under the River Clyde at Glasgow.

He and his second wife travelled to France and Germany, and he purchased an estate in mid-Wales at Doldowlod House, one mile south of Llanwrthwl, which he much improved.

In 1816, he took a trip on the paddle-steamer Comet, a product of his inventions, to revisit his home town of Greenock.

He died on 25 August 1819 at his home "Heathfield Hall" near Handsworth in Staffordshire (now part of Birmingham) at the age of 83. He was buried on 2 September in the graveyard of St Mary's Church, Handsworth. In 1826 Watt was commemorated at the church with a purpose-built mausoleum chapel, which was built over his grave to the south of the chancel. Designed by the architect Thomas Rickman, the mausoleum houses a white marble seated statue of Watt by Francis Legatt Chantrey, regarded by the artist himself as among his finest works.

== Family ==
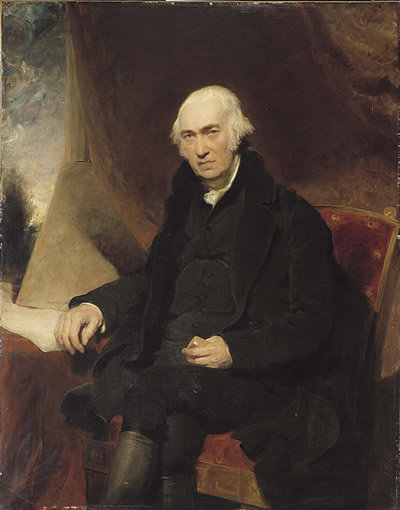
Portrait of James Watt by Thomas Lawrence, 1813

On 14 July 1764, Watt married his cousin Margaret Miller (d. 1773). They had two children, Margaret (1767–1796) and James (1769–1848). In 1791, their daughter married James Miller. In September 1773, while Watt was working in the Scottish Highlands, he learned that his wife, who was pregnant with their third child, was seriously ill. He immediately returned home but found that she had died and their child was stillborn.

On 29 July 1776, he married Ann MacGregor (d. 1832).

== Freemasonry ==
He was Initiated into Scottish Freemasonry in The Glasgow Royal Arch Lodge, No. 77, in 1763. The Lodge ceased to exist in 1810. A Masonic Lodge was named after him in his home town of Glasgow – Lodge James Watt, No. 1215.

== Murdoch's contributions ==
William Murdoch joined Boulton and Watt in 1777. At first, he worked in the pattern shop in Soho, but soon he was erecting engines in Cornwall. He became an important part of the firm and made many contributions to its success including important inventions of his own.

John Griffiths, who wrote a biography of him in 1992, has argued that Watt's discouragement of Murdoch's work with high-pressure steam on his steam road locomotive experiments delayed its development: Watt rightly believed that boilers of the time would be unsafe at higher pressures.

Watt patented the application of the sun and planet gear to steam in 1781 and a steam locomotive in 1784, both of which have strong claims to have been invented by Murdoch. The patent was never contested by Murdoch, however, and Boulton and Watt's firm continued to use the sun and planet gear in their rotative engines, even long after the patent for the crank expired in 1794. Murdoch was made a partner of the firm in 1810, where he remained until his retirement 20 years later at the age of 76.

== Legacy ==
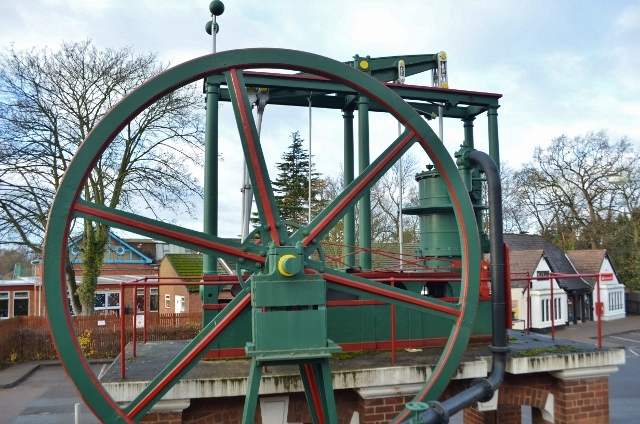
A preserved Watt beam engine at Loughborough University

As one author states, Watt's improvements to the steam engine "converted it from a prime mover of marginal efficiency into the mechanical workhorse of the Industrial Revolution".

== Honours ==
Watt was much honoured in his own time. In 1784, he was made a fellow of the Royal Society of Edinburgh, and was elected as a member of the Batavian Society for Experimental Philosophy, of Rotterdam, the Netherlands, in 1787. In 1789, he was elected to the elite group, the Smeatonian Society of Civil Engineers. In 1806, he was conferred the honorary Doctor of Laws by the University of Glasgow. The French Academy elected him a Corresponding Member and he was made a Foreign Associate in 1814.

The watt is named after James Watt for his contributions to the development of the steam engine, and was adopted by the Second Congress of the British Association for the Advancement of Science in 1889 and by the 11th General Conference on Weights and Measures in 1960 as the unit of power incorporated in the International System of Units (or "SI").

On 29 May 2009, the Bank of England announced that Boulton and Watt would appear on a new £50 note. The design is the first to feature a dual portrait on a Bank of England note, and presents the two industrialists side by side with images of Watt's steam engine and Boulton's Soho Manufactory. Quotations attributed to each of the men are inscribed on the note: "I sell here, sir, what all the world desires to have—POWER" (Boulton) and "I can think of nothing else but this machine" (Watt). The inclusion of Watt is the second time that a Scot has featured on a Bank of England note (the first was Adam Smith on the 2007 issue £20 note). In September 2011, it was announced that the notes would enter circulation on 2 November.

In 2011, he was one of seven inaugural inductees to the Scottish Engineering Hall of Fame.

== Memorials ==
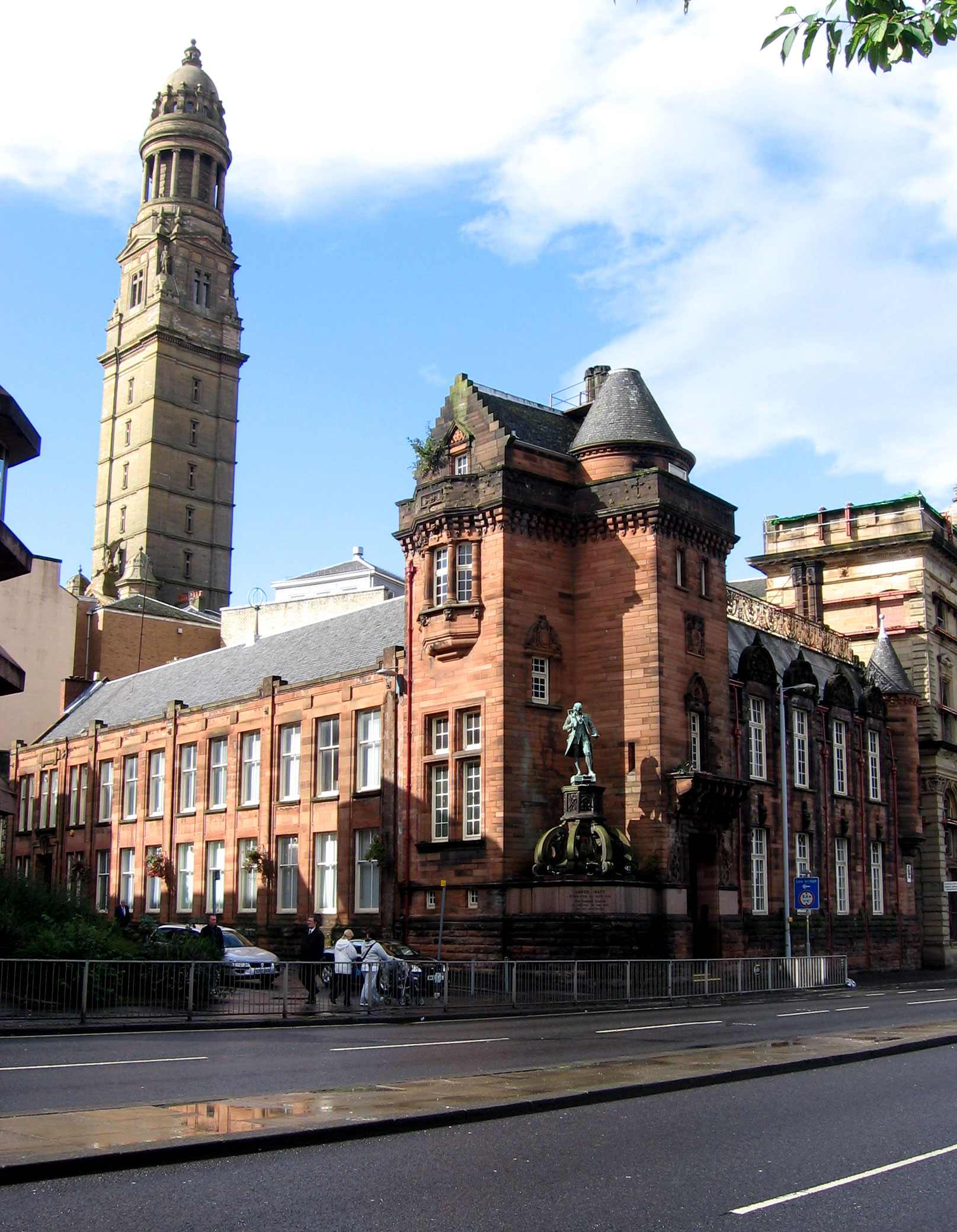
The James Watt Memorial College in Greenock

Watt was buried in the grounds of St Mary's Church, Handsworth on his death in 1819. In 1826 a purpose-built mausoleum chapel was built over his grave to the south of the chancel. This houses a white marble seated statue of Watt by Francis Chantrey.

The garret room workshop that Watt used in his retirement was left, locked and untouched, until 1853, when it was first viewed by his biographer J. P. Muirhead. Thereafter, it was occasionally visited, but left untouched, as a kind of shrine. A proposal to have it transferred to the Patent Office came to nothing. When the house was due to be demolished in 1924, the room and all its contents were presented to the Science Museum, where it was recreated in its entirety. It remained on display for visitors for many years, but was walled-off when the gallery it was housed in closed. The workshop remained intact, and preserved, and in March 2011 was put on public display as part of a new permanent Science Museum exhibition, "James Watt and our world".

The approximate location of James Watt's birth in Greenock is commemorated by a statue. Other memorials in Greenock include street names and the Watt Memorial Library, which was begun in 1816 with Watt's donation of scientific books, and developed as part of the Watt Institution by his son (which ultimately became the James Watt College). Taken over by the local authority in 1974, the library now also houses the local history collection and archives of Inverclyde, and is dominated by a large seated statue in the vestibule. Watt is additionally commemorated by statuary in George Square, Glasgow and Princes Street, Edinburgh, as well as others in Birmingham, where he is also remembered by the Moonstones and a school is named in his honour.

The James Watt College has expanded from its original location to include campuses in Kilwinning (North Ayrshire), Finnart Street and The Waterfront in Greenock, and the Sports campus in Largs. Heriot-Watt University near Edinburgh was at one time the School of Arts of Edinburgh, founded in 1821 as the world's first Mechanics Institute, but to commemorate George Heriot, the 16th-century financier to King James VI and I, and James Watt, after Royal Charter the name was changed to Heriot-Watt University. Dozens of university and college buildings (chiefly of science and technology) are named after him. Matthew Boulton's home, Soho House, is now a museum, commemorating the work of both men. The University of Glasgow's Faculty of Engineering has its headquarters in the James Watt Building, which also houses the department of Mechanical Engineering and the department of Aerospace Engineering. The huge painting James Watt contemplating the steam engine by James Eckford Lauder is now owned by the National Gallery of Scotland.

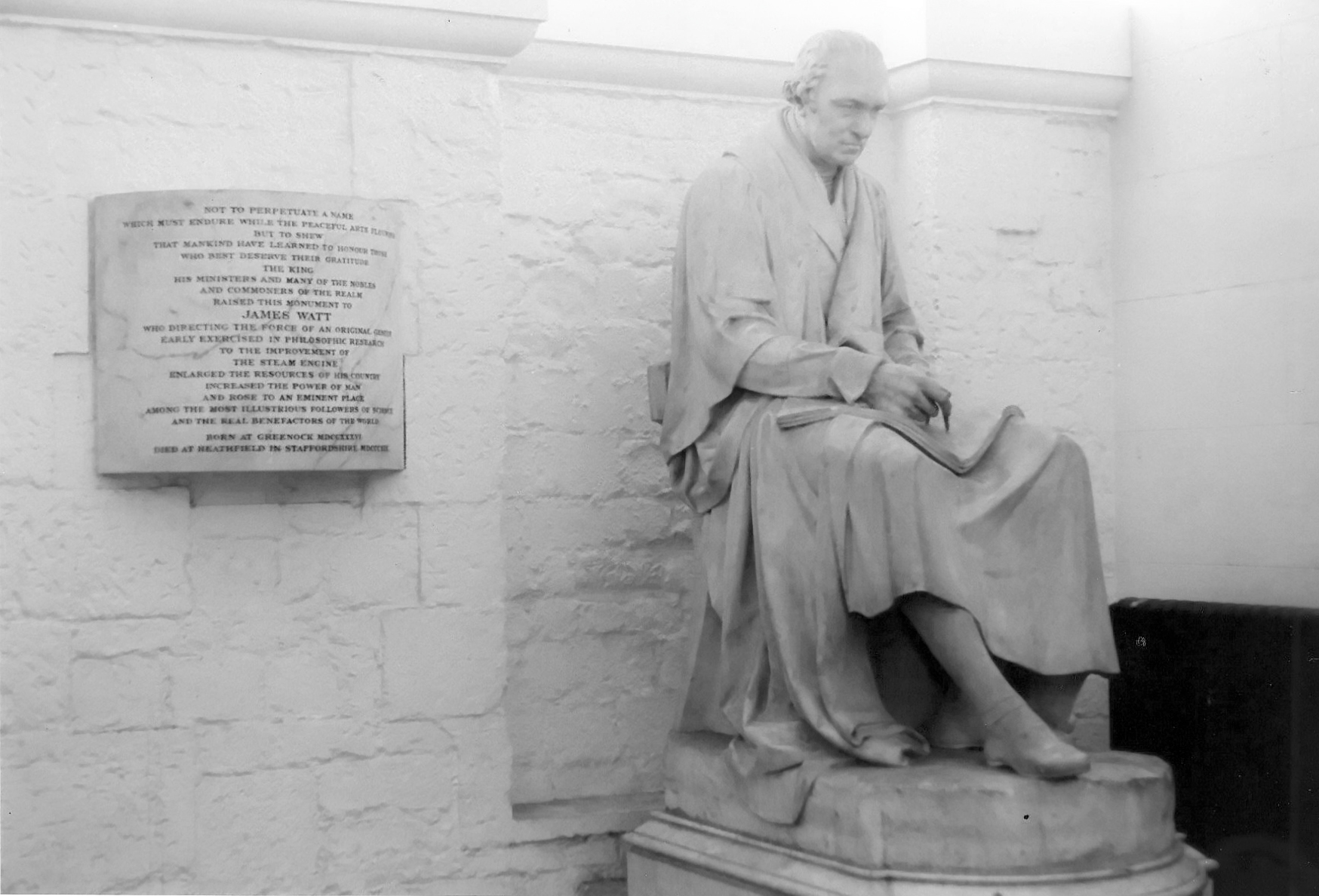
Chantrey's statue of James Watt

There is a statue of James Watt in Piccadilly Gardens, Manchester and City Square, Leeds.

A colossal statue of Watt by Francis Legatt Chantrey was placed in Westminster Abbey, and later was moved to St. Paul's Cathedral. On the cenotaph, the inscription reads, in part, "JAMES WATT ... ENLARGED THE RESOURCES OF HIS COUNTRY, INCREASED THE POWER OF MAN, AND ROSE TO AN EMINENT PLACE AMONG THE MOST ILLUSTRIOUS FOLLOWERS OF SCIENCE AND THE REAL BENEFACTORS OF THE WORLD".

A bust of Watt is in the Hall of Heroes of the National Wallace Monument in Stirling, Scotland.

A large statue of Watt – paired with one of George Stephenson – adorns the main façade of Budapest Keleti station.

The French Navy submarine Watt was named for Watt.

== Patents ==
Watt was the sole inventor listed on his six patents:

- Patent 913: A method of lessening the consumption of steam in steam engines – the separate condenser. The specification was accepted on 5 January 1769; enrolled on 29 April 1769, and extended to June 1800 by an Act of Parliament in 1775.
- Patent 1,244: A new method of copying letters. The specification was accepted on 14 February 1780 and enrolled on 31 May 1780.
- Patent 1,306: New methods to produce a continued rotation motion – sun and planet. The specification was accepted on 25 October 1781 and enrolled on 23 February 1782.
- Patent 1,321: New improvements upon steam engines – expansive and double acting. The specification was accepted on 14 March 1782 and enrolled on 4 July 1782.
- Patent 1,432: New improvements upon steam engines – three bar motion and steam carriage. The specification was accepted on 28 April 1782 and enrolled on 25 August 1782.
- Patent 1,485: Newly improved methods of constructing furnaces. The specification was accepted on 14 June 1785 and enrolled on 9 July 1785.
