= Soho Manufactory =

Early factory in Birmingham, England (1766–1853)

Coordinates: 52.49888°N 1.92630°W

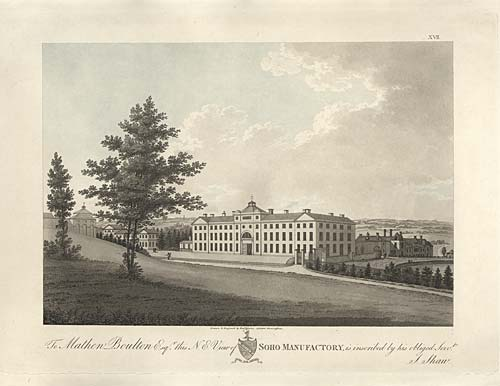
The Soho Manufactory in 1800.

The Soho Manufactory (grid reference SP051890) was an early factory which pioneered mass production on the assembly line principle, in Soho, Birmingham, England, at the beginning of the Industrial Revolution. It operated from 1766–1848 and was demolished in 1863.

== Beginnings ==
In 1756, Edward Ruston leased land on Handsworth Heath from the Lord of the Manor. He deepened Hockley Brook, and built a rolling mill powered by it.

In 1761 (or 1764) the "toy" manufacturer Matthew Boulton and his business partner John Fothergill leased the site including a cottage and the mill. The mill was replaced by a new factory, designed and built by the Wyatt family of Lichfield, and completed in 1766. The cottage was later demolished and Boulton's home (Soho House) was built on the site, also by the Wyatts.

== Production ==
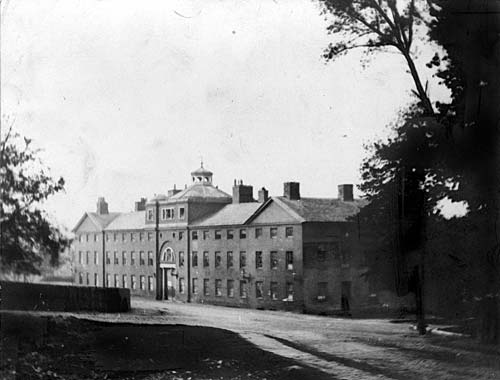
The Soho Manufactory c. 1860.

The Manufactory produced a wide range of goods from buttons, buckles and boxes to japanned ware (collectively called "toys"), and later luxury products such as silverware and ormolu (a type of gilded bronze).

=== Steam engines ===
In 1782, it became the first site with a Watt steam engine with the sun and planet gear. It was also home to the first steam-powered mint, whose presses were subsequently used at the first Birmingham Mint.

== Later ==
In later years, the Manufactory was served by canal at Soho Wharf, at the end of the short Soho Branch of the Birmingham Canal Navigations' Soho Loop.

The manufactory was demolished in 1863 and the site subsequently used for housing.

== Cultural references ==
In the 1990s the television archaeology programme Time Team excavated the foundations, in some of the local back gardens. (Series 4, Ep. 3, 1997)

The Manufactory is featured on the Bank of England £50 note along with Matthew Boulton, James Watt, and the Whitbread Engine.

== See also ==
- Soho Foundry
- Soho Mint
- Old Bess
