= Logan Henderson (engineer) =

English engineer in the late 1700s

Logan Henderson (fl. 1770–1790) was an English engineer employed at Boulton & Watt, developers and vendors of the earliest commercially successful steam engines. He played a significant role in recruiting and retaining talent during the early development of the company, and in the invention of 'The Counter', one of the first instruments for measuring the work output of an industrial machine.

Although little is known about Henderson's early life, correspondence cited from the Boulton & Watt archives indicates that prior to his hiring he was a lieutenant in the Thirty-First Company of Marines (Note: The 31st Regiment of Foot saw service during the First Carib War on Saint Vincent in the West Indies. When a peace was signed in 1773, many of the regiment were discharged and the rest returned to Britain. Henderson may have been amongst those remaining.) and had been an unsuccessful planter in Jamaica. In their history, James Watt and the Steam Engine, H.W. Dickinson and Rhys Jenkins note that Henderson was the first technical assistant employed by Boulton & Watt, where he also served as an "erector," supervising the construction and installation of some of the earliest steam engines.

Watt first encountered Henderson when he approached the newly-formed partnership of Boulton and Watt in 1776 with a scheme for a rotary steam engine. The shift from the first steam engines with purely vertical movement, i.e. pumping engines, to those capable of rotary motion and of powering machinery was an obvious and important step in their development. This was still 5 years before Watt's first practical rotary engine, but 11 years after Watt's own first ideas for a rotating 'steam wheel'. This delay was partly due to pressure of work on Boulton and Watt for their already-successful pumping engines, but it also indicates that the problem was far from straightforward. After several attempts of the purely rotary 'steam wheel' form, Watt's successful rotative engine design was a development of the pumping engines with a mechanism to convert linear motion to rotary, such as for the Lap Engine. Watt dismissed Henderson's rotary engine design as less effective than their own efforts, but did go on to engage Henderson to work for them.

Dickinson and Jenkins recount how Henderson drew on an idea originating with Boulton to work with the Liverpool firm Wyke and Green to adapt their pedometer mechanism to make a device that would count the strokes of a steam engine. This device, which Boulton & Watt used to calculate royalties due from a customer, may have been the first mechanical means to measure the work output of an engine.

Christopher Olive, in his discussion of Boulton & Watt staff, describes Henderson as difficult to get along with. Boulton & Watt biographer Samuel Smiles calls Henderson "a sort of Jack-of-all-trades and master of none." Although he was friendly with Watt and may have been critical to the firm's retaining William Murdoch, a key employee later responsible for applying the steam engine to train locomotives, Boulton had a very unfavorable opinion of Henderson and viewed him with suspicion, describing him as "most diabolical."

By 1790 Henderson had left Boulton & Watt and applied without success to be Engineer of the Dublin Waterworks.
