= Boulton and Watt =

British engineering firm, 1775–1895

Boulton & Watt
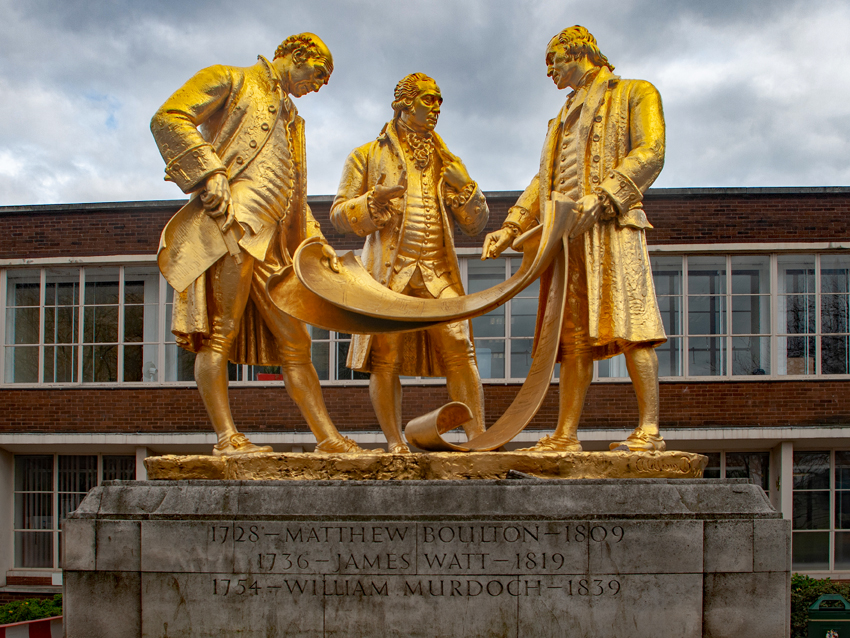
- Statue of Boulton, Watt and Murdoch in Birmingham
- Type: General partnership
- Industry: Engineering, manufacturing
- Founded: 1775; 251 years ago in Birmingham, England
- Founder: Matthew Boulton; James Watt
- Defunct: c. 1895
- Key people: Matthew Boulton; James Watt; William Murdoch
- Products: Steam engines (stationary and marine)
- Services: Engineering consulting

Boulton & Watt was an early British engineering and manufacturing firm in the business of designing and making marine and stationary steam engines. Founded in the English West Midlands around Birmingham in 1775 as a partnership between the English manufacturer Matthew Boulton and the Scottish engineer James Watt, the firm had a major role in the Industrial Revolution and grew to be a major producer of steam engines in the 19th century.

== The engine partnership ==
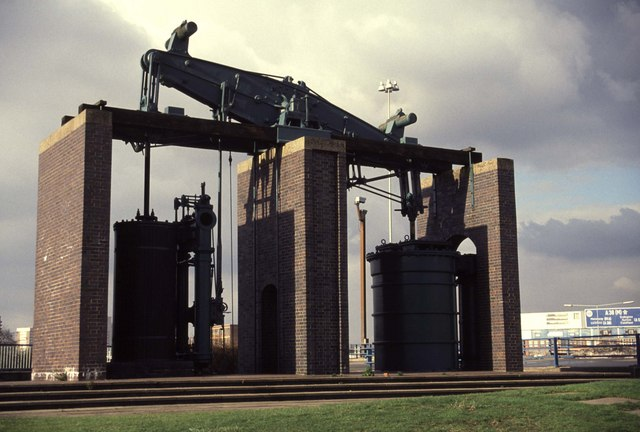
A Boulton & Watt blowing engine re-erected on the Dartmouth Circus roundabout on the A38(M) in Birmingham, UK. It was built in 1817 and used in Netherton at the ironworks of M W Grazebrook. (Location: 52.492537°N 1.888189°W)

The partnership was formed in 1775 to exploit Watt's patent for a steam engine with a separate condenser. This made much more efficient use of its fuel than the older Newcomen engine. Initially the business was based at the Soho Manufactory near Boulton's Soho House on the southern edge of the then-rural parish of Handsworth. However most of the components for their engines were made by others, for example the cylinders by John Wilkinson.

In 1795, they began to make steam engines themselves at their Soho Foundry in Smethwick, near Birmingham, England. Between 1775 and 1800, Boulton and Watt produced 496 engines. The partnership was passed to two of their sons in 1800. William Murdoch was made a partner of the firm in 1810, where he remained until his retirement 20 years later at the age of 76. The firm lasted over 120 years, albeit renamed "James Watt & Co." in 1849, and was still making steam engines in 1895, when it was sold to W & T Avery Ltd.

For ten years their banker in London was Charlotte Matthews after her husband died in 1792. A woman banker was unusual but she became a close confidante, holidaying with Boulton, and she lent them enormous sums to fund their endeavours. When she died aged 43 in 1802 her business was run by the Boulton and Watt families.

The business trained young engineers who went on to achieve notability. Among the names which were employed there in the eighteenth century were James Law, Peter Ewart, William Brunton, Isaac Perrins, William Murdoch, James Watt, Jr., William Playfair, and John Southern.

== Archive ==
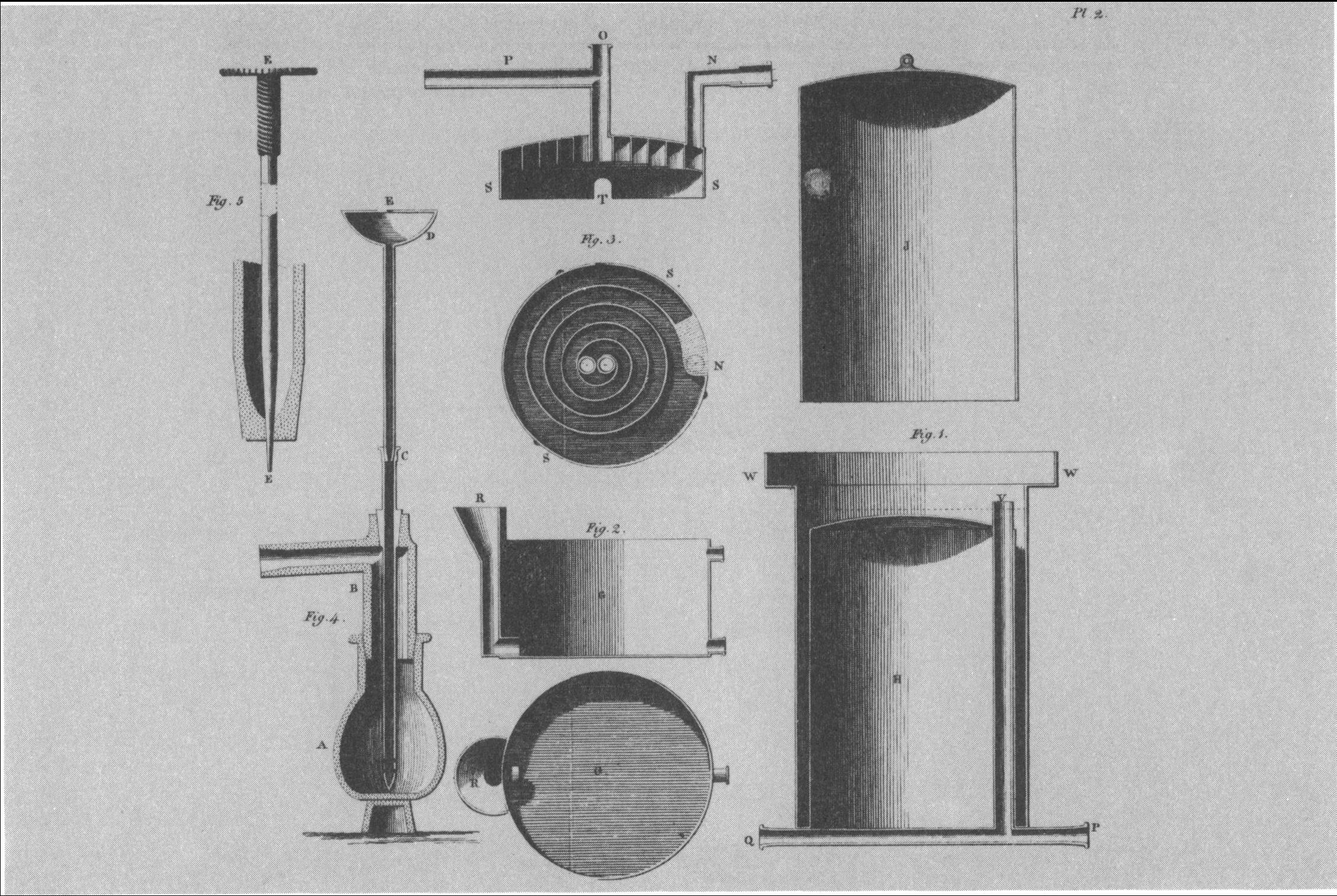
Scientific apparatus designed by Boulton and Watt in preparation of the Pneumatic Institution in Bristol

The firm left an extremely detailed archive of its activities, which was given to the city of Birmingham in 1911 and is kept at the Library of Birmingham. An additional archive was donated to the Boulton and Watt collection in 2015 including a thesis. The archive contains: Display folders containing text and varieties of drawings.

== Preserved operational engines ==
- Smethwick Engine, Thinktank, Birmingham Science Museum, manufactured 1779.
- Whitbread Engine, Powerhouse Museum, Sydney, manufactured 1785, 25-inch (64 cm) bore, 72-inch (180 cm) stroke.
- Crofton Pumping Station manufactured 1812, 42 1/4-inch (107 cm) bore, 84-inch (210 cm) stroke.
- Kew Bridge Steam Museum manufactured 1820, 64-inch (160 cm) bore, 96-inch (240 cm) stroke.
- Papplewick Pumping Station two engines, manufactured 1884, 46-inch (120 cm) bore, 90-inch (230 cm) stroke. Believed to be the last engines manufactured by the company.

== Notable people ==
- Samuel Clegg
- Logan Henderson, engineer

== See also ==
- Beam Engine
- Watt steam engine
