= Reciprocating motion =

Repetitive back-and-forth linear motion

Double-acting stationary steam engine demonstrating conversion of reciprocating motion to rotary motion. The piston is on the left, and the crank is mounted on the flywheel axle on the right

Machine demonstrating the conversion of rotary motion to reciprocating motion using gears. The bottom pair of gears drives the mechanism

Reciprocating motion, also called reciprocation, is a repetitive up-and-down or back-and-forth linear motion. It is found in a wide range of mechanisms, including reciprocating engines and pumps. The two opposite motions that comprise a single reciprocation cycle are called strokes.

A crank can be used to convert into reciprocating motion, or conversely turn reciprocating motion into circular motion.

For example, inside an internal combustion engine (a type of reciprocating engine), the expansion of burning fuel in the cylinders periodically pushes the piston down, which, through the connecting rod, turns the crankshaft. The continuing rotation of the crankshaft drives the piston back up, ready for the next cycle. The piston moves in a reciprocating motion, which is converted into the circular motion of the crankshaft, which ultimately propels the vehicle or does other useful work.

The reciprocating motion of a pump piston is close to but different from, sinusoidal simple harmonic motion. Assuming the wheel is driven at a perfect constant rotational velocity, the point on the crankshaft which connects to the connecting rod rotates smoothly at a constant velocity in a circle. Thus, the displacement of that point is indeed exactly sinusoidal by definition. However, during the cycle, the angle of the connecting rod changes continuously, so the horizontal displacement of the "far" end of the connecting rod (i.e., connected to the piston) differs slightly from sinusoidal. Additionally, if the wheel is not spinning with perfect constant rotational velocity, such as in a steam locomotive starting up from a stop, the motion will be even less sinusoidal.

== See also ==
- Oscillation – Repetitive variation of some measure about a central value
- Stroboscope – Instrument used to make a cyclically moving object appear to be slow-moving, or stationary
- Reciprocating saw – Type of machine powered saw
- Reciprocating engine – Engine utilising one or more reciprocating pistons
- Rotary reciprocating saw – Type of mechanical saw
- Agitation – Device or mechanism which shakes or stirs something
- Scotch yoke – Mechanism to convert between rotational and reciprocating motion
- Crank – Simple machine transferring motion to or from a rotating shaft at a distance from the centreline
- Crankshaft – Mechanism for converting reciprocating motion to rotation
- Swashplate – Mechanism to convert between reciprocating and rotary motion
- Trip hammer – Type of blacksmithing tool
- Slider-crank linkage – Mechanism for converting rotary motion into linear motion
- Straight line mechanism – Mechanisms generating real or approximate straight line motion
- Reciprocating compressor – Device used to pump gases at high pressure
- Sun and planet gear – Type of gear used in early beam engines
