= Soho House =

House and museum in Birmingham, England

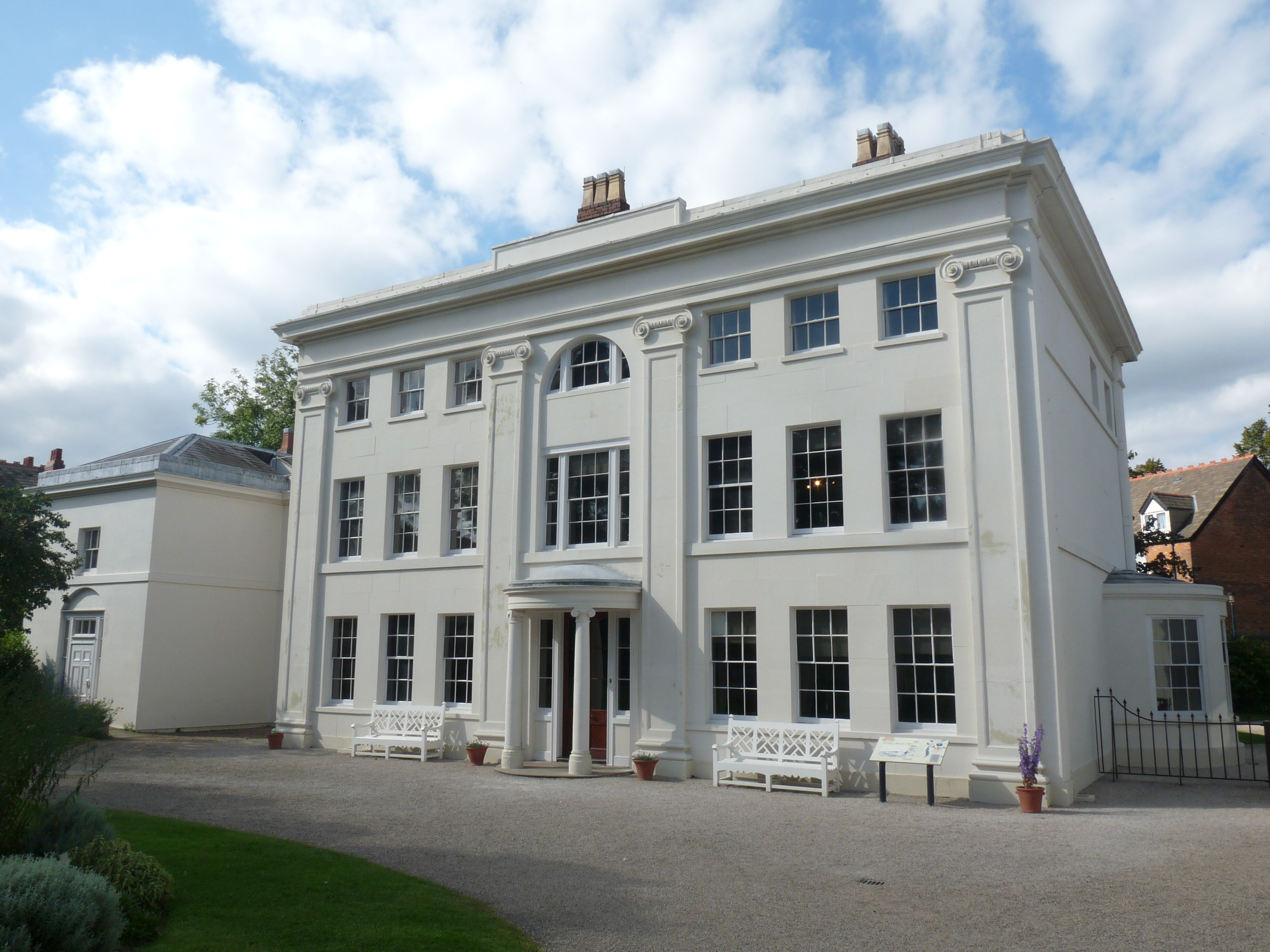
- Soho House from the front

- Location in West Midlands
- 52°29′59″N 1°55′22″W
- Location: Handsworth
- OS grid reference: SP 05332 89078

History
- Built: c. 1756

Site notes
- Area: Birmingham
- Governing body: Birmingham Museums Trust
- Owner: Birmingham City Council

Listed Building – Grade II*
- Designated: 25 April 1952
- Reference no.: 1076151

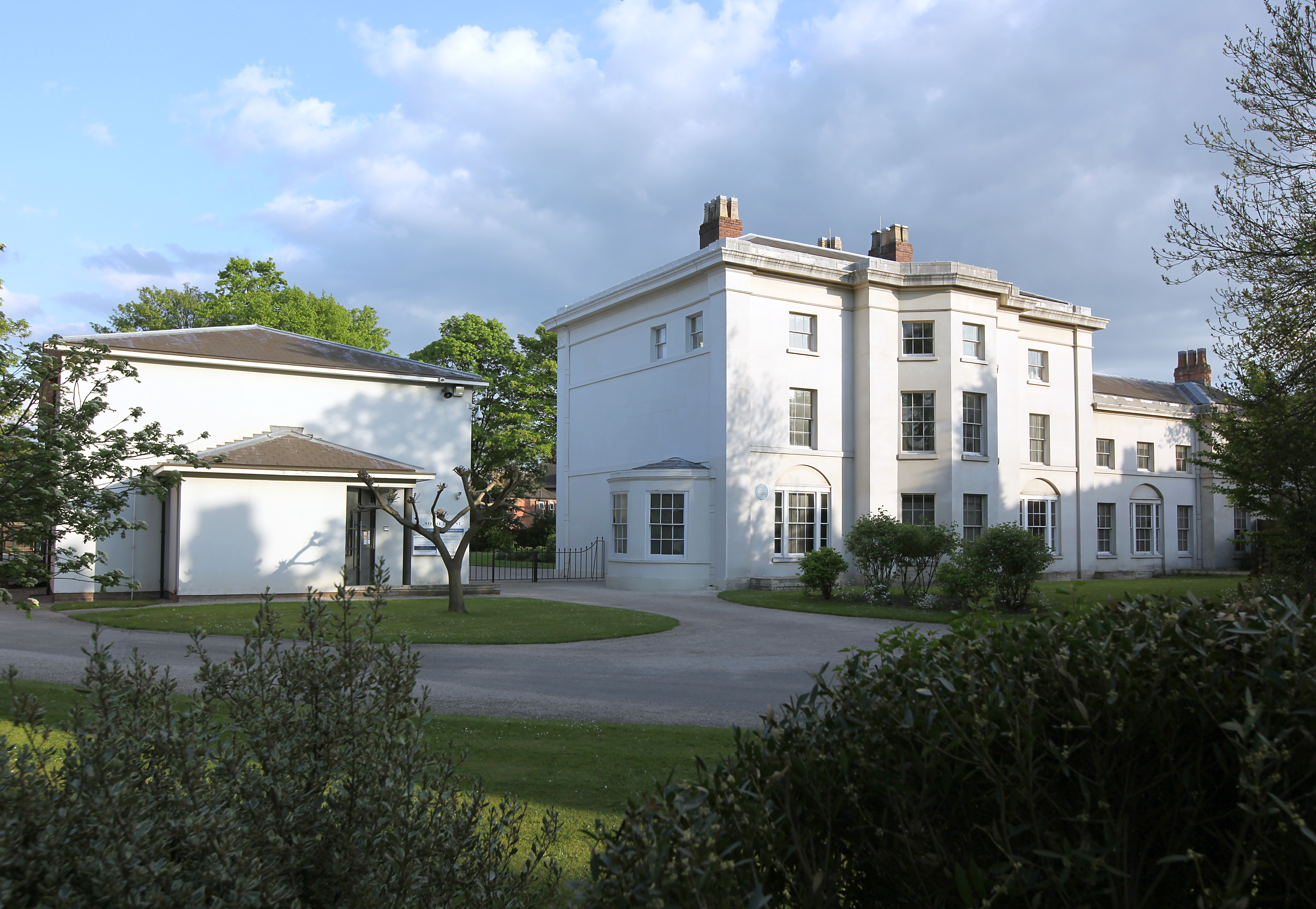
Soho House (middle building); rear view with side buildings, as seen from today's access road.

Soho House is a museum run by Birmingham Museums Trust, celebrating Matthew Boulton's life, his partnership with James Watt, his membership of the Lunar Society of Birmingham and his contribution to the Midlands Enlightenment and the Industrial Revolution. It is a Grade II* listed 18th-century house in Handsworth, part of Birmingham since 1911, but historically in the county of Staffordshire. It was the home of entrepreneur Matthew Boulton from 1766 until his death in 1809, and a regular meeting-place of the Lunar Society.

== History ==
Matthew Boulton, one of the 18th century's most significant entrepreneurs, acquired the lease of the five-year-old Soho Mill in 1761 and developed it into Soho Manufactory. He expanded the cottage next to it into Soho House, changing it several times. It is faced with sheets of painted slate to give the appearance of large stone blocks. Boulton moved into Soho House when the Manufactory was completed. The Soho Manufactory was demolished in 1863.

In 1766, Boulton became one of the founders of the Lunar Society. In 1789, Boulton commissioned Samuel Wyatt to extend the buildings and fully revamp it and the gardens. Work on extending the building was completed in 1796 following the submission of designs by James Wyatt, Samuel's brother, for the additions of a main entrance front. Wyatt was also responsible for the large dining room, the regular venue for meetings of the Lunar Society. It is a Grade II* listed building.

After Boulton's death, in the house, it passed to his son Matthew Robinson Boulton and later his grandson, Matthew Piers Watt Boulton, who eventually sold it in 1850. It then had a number of owners, and was at one time used as a residential hostel for police officers, before being acquired by Birmingham City Council in 1990 and being opened by them as a museum in 1995.

== Features ==
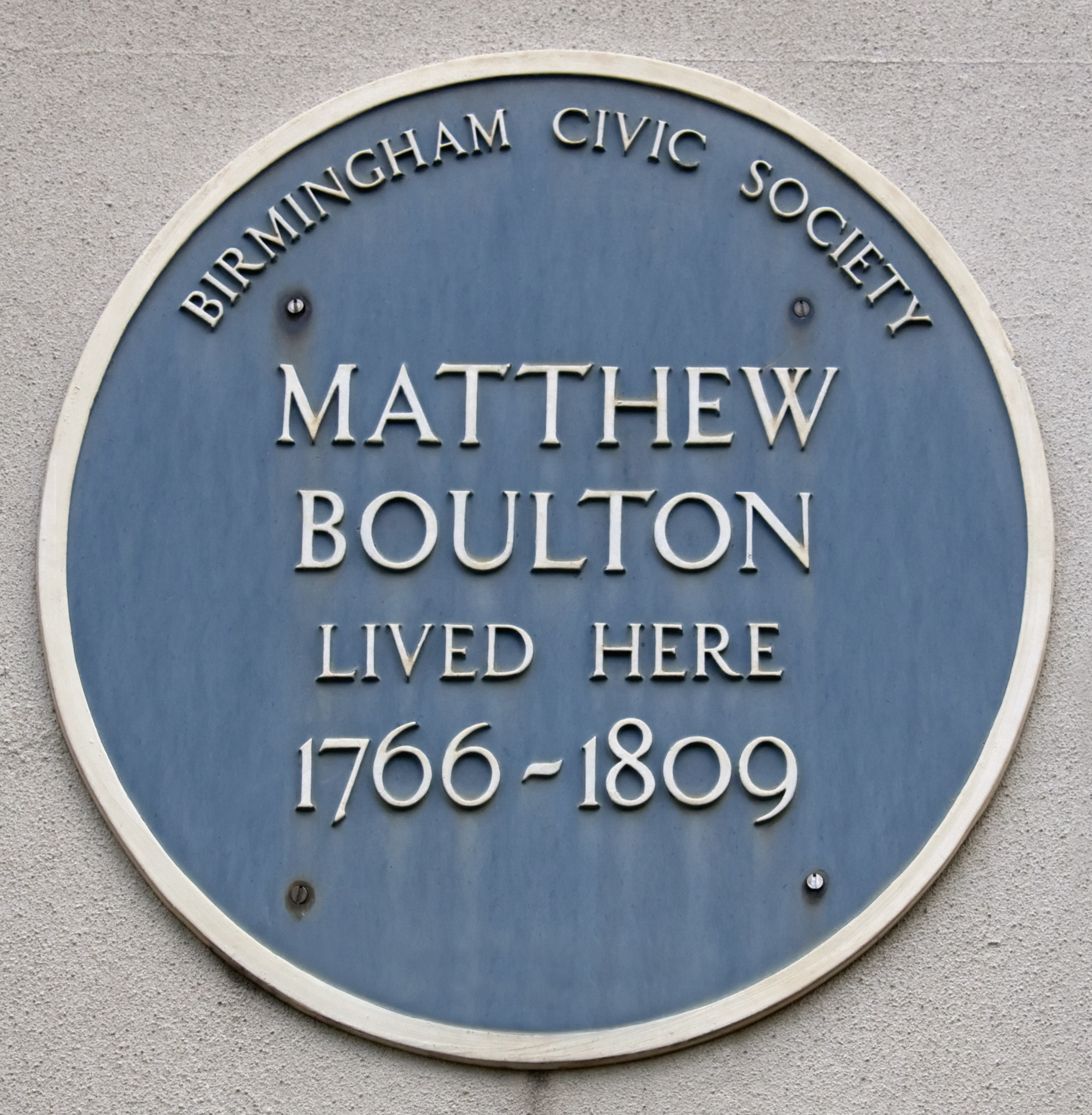
The Blue Plaque

Soho House has been restored, retaining its 18th-century appearance, with "fine collections of ormolu, silver, furniture and paintings". Of particular note are the displays of silver and ormolu which were made in the manufactory, and the ormolu Sidereal clock made by Boulton and Fothergill, in 1771–72. There is a Blue Plaque commemorating Matthew Boulton on the house. The garden, once over 100 acres in size but now less than half an acre, contains a walk with sphinxes, dated to around 1795. Part of the garden has been recreated using Boulton's original planting notes.

== Museum ==
Soho House is a Heritage Site and branch museum of the Birmingham Museums & Art Gallery, owned by Birmingham City Council. Since April 2012 the Heritage Sites and all other museums formerly run by the council have been run by Birmingham Museums Trust. It hosts exhibitions of local and community interest. Previously free, since April 2011 admission charges apply for entry to the house. It remains free to under 16s. Gardens, grounds and visitor facilities are free to all visitors. Artists-in-residence at the house have included Vanley Burke and Pauline Bailey.
