= Matthew Piers Watt Boulton =

British classicist (1820–1894)

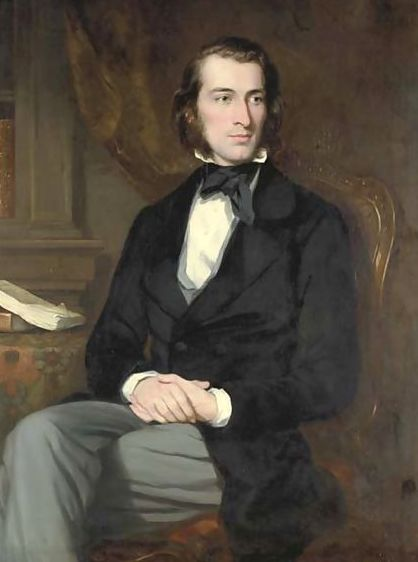
- Portrait of Boulton by Sir Francis Grant, c. 1850
- Born: 22 September 1820; Mose Old Norton, Staffordshire, England
- Died: 30 June 1894 (aged 73); London, England
- Other name: M. P. W. Bolton
- Education: Trinity College, Cambridge
- Occupations: Philosopher-scientist; classicist; inventor
- Known for: Invention of the aileron; translations of classical works; scientific and other papers
- Notable work: On Aërial Locomotion (1864)
- Spouses: Frances Eliza Cartwright (m. 1845; died 1864) Pauline Gleissberg (m. 1864)
- Children: Four daughters and two sons
- Parents: Matthew Robinson Boulton; Mary Anne Wilkinson
- Relatives: Matthew Boulton (grandfather); William Ralph Cartwright (father-in-law)

Matthew Piers Watt Boulton (22 September 1820 – 30 June 1894), also published under the pseudonym M. P. W. Bolton, was a British classicist, elected member of the UK's Metaphysical Society, an amateur scientist and an inventor, best known for his invention of the aileron, a primary aeronautical flight control device. He patented the aileron in 1868, some 36 years before it was first employed in manned flight by Robert Esnault-Pelterie in 1904.

Boulton was the son of Matthew Robinson Boulton, and as well the grandson of Matthew Boulton, who founded the Soho Manufactory and the Soho Mint. His grandfather also co-founded the Soho Foundry with James Watt, that employed steam engines of the latter's design, and which helped propel the Industrial Revolution. Born into a family of significant wealth and means, M. P. W. was broadly educated in the classics, philosophy and sciences, subsequently becoming well versed in steam engine design, and then transferring his interest to the basic conceptual designs of jet propulsion and rocket motors. However, whatever personal interest he held in the foundry's operation and the coinage mint he inherited from his father soon waned, and he subsequently closed and sold the mint facility in 1850. Thereafter he conducted numerous studies, wrote a wide variety of papers and earned a number of patents, including for an aileron flight control system, various types of motive power engines and their components such as propellers and pumps, plus other works on solar heat, photography and more.

Despite being married twice and raising a large family, Boulton was described as reclusive by those who knew him. He was one of only five members of the Metaphysical Society who did not appear in the British Dictionary of National Biography. His Times obituary described him as "a gifted member of a gifted family ... [with] wide knowledge and sterling qualities"; however, he appears to have never sought notability nor gained it in his lifetime, and his accomplishments are known chiefly through his patents and published writings.

== Early life ==
Boulton was born 22 September 1820 at Mose Old Norton, Staffordshire, England, to Matthew Robinson Boulton (8 August 1770 – 16 May 1842) and Mary Anne Wilkinson (27 November 1795 – 7 June 1829). He was baptized at St. Mary's Church, Handsworth, Staffordshire on 9 November 1820. M. P. W.'s ancestors can be traced back to John Bolton (his surname missing the u, which was included one or two generations later) of Lichfield, Staffordshire, who married (the later-to-be wealthy) Elizabeth, daughter of Matthew Dyott of Stichbrooke, Staffordshire in the late 15th century. John Bolton is believed descended from, possibly a grandson of Robert Bolton (1572 – 19 December 1631), rector of Broughton, Northamptonshire in 1609 until his death.

M. P. W. Boulton's immediate family included two younger brothers (both whom survived childhood but died unmarried) as well as three sisters and eight cousins. His brother-in-law, James Patrick Muirhead (1813–1890, husband to Boulton's elder sister Katharine Elizabeth, 1816–1890), (Note: M. P. W.'s elder sister Katharine Elizabeth Boulton (or Katherine Elizabeth Boulton) was born in 1816 and married James Patrick Muirhead of Haseley Court, Glasgow, son of Lockhart and Anna Muirhead, on 27 January 1844. She gave birth to six children: Lionel Boulton Campbell Lockhart (b. 16 January 1845); Francis Montagu (b. 26 July 1847); Beatrix Marion (b. 21 November 1849); Herbert Hugh (b. 10 December 1850); Bertram Arthur (b. 17 July 1852); and Eleanor Anne (b. circa 1854). Katharine died on 23 May 1890. James or his other family members also leased the Haseley Court Manor in Gloucestershire that M. P. W. Boulton would later purchase in 1880.) would become James Watt's biographer.

Boulton's grandfather Matthew Boulton and James Watt had perfected the steam engine during the 1770s which soon set off the Industrial Revolution in England, and later the rest of the world. Matthew Piers Watt was named after his grandfather as well as his grandfather's close business partner, James Watt who had jointly created the Soho Foundry which employed their engines. Boulton's second given name also reflected the family of his great-grandmother, the Piers of Chester, Bull Ring, Birmingham.

In 1815–1816 M. P. W.'s father, Matthew Robinson Boulton, bought the 3,250 hectares (8,000 acres) Great Tew Estate and manor in the civil parish of Cotswold Hills in Oxfordshire. In 1825 he added a Gothic Revival library to the east end of the manor house, and by the middle of the 19th century the Boulton family had a large Tudor style section designed by F.S. Waller added to the west end. The Great Tew Estate would remain with Boulton's immediate family until M. P. W.'s son Matthew Ernest Boulton died without heirs in 1914, after which it was eventually inherited by a more distant relative.

Boulton's early education included instruction at a private school in Royal Leamington Spa (simply called Leamington) run by Reverend Atwood, the Vicar of Kenilworth. There were but six boys in this school with a good measure of religious instruction. He attended with his younger brother Hugh William (1821–1847) who would die at age 26, and with Francis Galton, later Sir Francis Galton, the brilliant English polymath who became his friend and remained so through Cambridge.

Boulton studied the classics, philosophy and sciences at Eton. In one letter written from Eton with "boyish enthusiasm", Boulton described life at his boarding school:

"About a week ago two boys named Waring & Stanley . . . having procured a pack of beagles went out hunting, and, being discovered by Mr Luxmoore, ran away. They were not heard of for two or three days after, but they came back on Monday, and were flogged and turned down....." "The chief games are still foot-ball and hockey, but a great many go out in boats, which however are forbidden at this time....." "My new companion Fane is rather older than I am, as he will be 14 in May, he is rather good-natured, and is neither clever nor stupid."

In October 1838 Boulton entered Trinity College, Cambridge where he undertook studies of mathematics, logic and the classics. His first tutor in Cambridge was the English mathematician George Peacock (then Cambridge's Lowndean Professor of Astronomy and a friend of Charles Babbage). Among Boulton's earliest accomplishments was earning the Eton Prize in February 1839 for his essay, The Decline and Fall of the Persian Empire, and an award for his collection of witty epigrams at Cambridge University in 1841. He also won two of Cambridge's Sir William Browne Medals for Latin and Greek poetry. (Note: Two of the Sir William Browne Medals for 1841 were won by Boulton for his Latin epigram: Vehicula vi vaporis impulsa (Vehicles driven by the power of steam), and for his Greek epigram: Hoc est Vivere bis, vita posse priore frui.) Dr. Chris Upton of Birmhingham's Newman University wrote on Boulton's 1841 Latin poem Vehicula vi vaporis impulsa, roughly meaning "Vehicles driven by the power of steam". Describing Boulton's poem in an English rendering, Upton wrote:

"Devilish" he calls the machine, cutting through the middle of mountains, slicing through the countryside. Faster than a thunderbolt it speeds... until..:

"But ah! an axle breaks, and then
Off line the train goes crashing
With dire destruction, men on men,
Noses on noses dashing. . ."

"Of such mere trifles, who complains?
May science reign eternal,
And in these railroad days run trains

Express to realms infernal."

However even as a young man Boulton earned a reputation for avoiding the notice of his peers as he had "...no wish to attract the attention of his contemporaries", eventually eschewing university scholarships and other limelight. Boulton showed a "compete indifference to all the rewards and distinctions attached to the manifestations of them", as written by his second Cambridge tutor, Reverend John Moore Heath (1808–1882), in a letter to the student's father and sponsor. Boulton's refusal to compete for Trinity and other university scholarships was based on his belief that the competitions did "more harm than good", and in any event their awards were of far greater value to the poor students of the university.

Boulton graduated from Cambridge with his B.A. in 1845.

== Family life ==
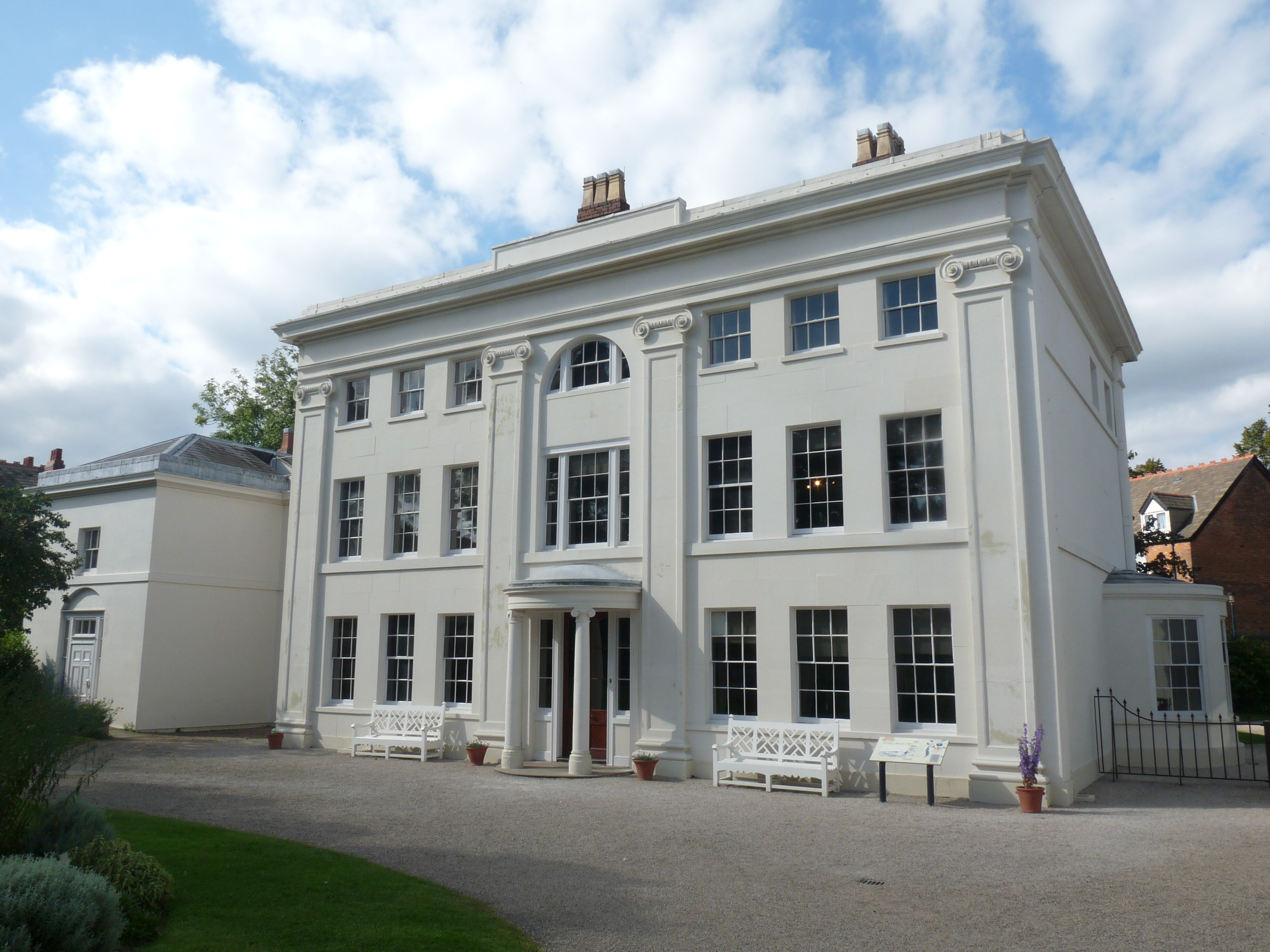
Soho House, in Handsworth, Birmingham, one of several Boulton family residences

Boulton was married twice; his first marriage on 27 November 1845 was to Frances Eliza Cartwright (b. Northamptonshire 1817 – d. Great Malvern, Worcestershire 1864), the daughter of Lieutenant-Colonel William Ralph Cartwright and his second wife Julia Frances Aubrey. Her father served as a Tory politician and sat in the British House of Commons between 1797 and 1846. Boulton's first marriage produced two daughters, Marianne Aubrey (sometimes Mary Anne Audrey, b. London, 1854–1934) (Note: Marianne Aubrey Boulton {I0978} (b. London, 1854 – 18 September 1934), also resided at 181, 182 & 183 Piccadilly, London, Middlesex, along with her sister Ethel Julia Boulton as recorded in an 1881 census. At the time of her death she resided at the Hotel du Louvre, Mentone, France. Her will was probated by her sister Clara Gertrude and Guy, Marriner, Whittell & Holt. She married Llewelyn Malcolm Wynne {I0979} (b. ~1847, London, Middlesex), a Conservative M.P. of Surrey, in March 1881; their address was Chipping Norton.) and Ethel Julia (b. Tew, 1858–1924).

After selling Soho House and his father's mint facility in 1850, Boulton retired to his family's manor and estate of Great Tew, in the Oxfordshire village of the same name, and also living in London. An 1851 census listed him at the former as a landed proprietor, along with a nephew, Thomas Robert Cartwright (age 20), and nine servants.

Following the death of his first wife Frances Eliza in 1864, Boulton remarried with Pauline Gleissberg (b. Germany, 1837–1911), (Note: Pauline Gleissberg {I0485} died 28 June 1911, and her estate of £12,558 was probated by her sons Matthew Ernest Boulton and Frederick Montagu Boulton, Esquires.) daughter of Ernst Gleissberg, dean of the city of Cannstatt in the German kingdom of Württemberg. Together they had four children: Clara Gertrude (later to be Lady of the Manor of Great Tew, b. Knightsbridge, 1868–1954), (Note: Clara Gertrude Boulton also resided at Ridgewood House, Uckfield, Sussex. She died on 14 July 1954 and is buried in the churchyard of Great Tew's St Michael & All Angels.) his first son Matthew Ernest Kensington (b. Paddington, 1870–1914), (Note: Matthew Ernest Kensington Boulton {I0966} was born in London, October 1870; arm. Christ Church, he matriculated 8 June 89 (from Eton), and graduated with his B.A. in 1892. He died on 14 July 1914 at Moorcroft, Hillingdon, Middlesex, England, and has a headstone in the churchyard of Great Tew's St Michael & All Angels. His estate of £445,439 was probated by step-sister Ethel Julia Boulton with Spinster and Lionel, Boulton, Campbell, Lockhart, Muirhead, Esq., the Public Trustee.) Pauline Margaret (b. Switzerland, 1872–1918) and Frederick Montagu (b. Great Tew, 1875–1912). (Note: Frederick Montagu Boulton {I0965} was born at Great Tew in 1875 and died on 21 February 1912 at Birse, Aberdeen, Scotland, and has a headstone in the churchyard of Great Tew's St Michael & All Angels; his estate of £20,428 was probated by his brother Matthew Ernest Kensington Boulton, Esq.)

== Later years: career, publications and scientific works ==
Boulton's On Aërial Locomotion, published in 1864, describing several methods of aircraft propulsion.

Boulton became a Justice of the Peace, Deputy Lieutenant, and High Sheriff of Oxfordshire before the age of 30. He was part of the landed gentry due to his family's holdings at Tew Park, and the Great Haseley Court estate and manor that M. P. W. later purchased in Tetworth, Gloucestershire in 1880. (Note: Great Haseley Estate, earlier owned by Henry V, had been frequently leased to the Muirhead family prior to its purchase by their brother-in-law M. P. W. The Boulton family would also purchase the adjoining estates at Latchford and Little Haseley. The Little and Great Haseley plus Latchford estates were then combined into one larger one. By 1910 M. P. W.'s eldest son Matthew held more than 1,500 acres (610 ha) in the various estates in Gloucestershire.) Boulton improved the Tew estate by enlarging its grand three-story manor house, adding another garden and refining its grove.

With the death of his father in 1848, he inherited the large fortune created by both his father's and grandfather's enterprises, permitting him, his large household and his relatives a comfortable life. Up to 11 servants were employed to administer to his manor and estate. Boulton's inheritance made him wealthy, but he had little desire to continue his family's businesses which he subsequently closed, disposing of their assets by sale. His financial independence allowed him to pursue studies and writings as a philosopher-scientist on a wide variety of subjects. Among them were at least two pamphlets in the early 1860s refuting the authenticity of purported 18th-century photographs; (Note: Eric Robinson's 1970 article, Matthew Boulton's Mechanical Paintings, discusses the brouhaha that evolved from the a 19th-century study which suggested that Matthew Boulton's Soho Manufactory had mechanically produced illustrated japanware and plates through a photographic process as early as 1780, some two decades prior to the earliest known such methods. Several arguments and rebuttals between M. P. W. Boulton and others, including a curator, were involved, leading to Boulton publishing at least two pamphlets (one which was later revised after Boulton reviewed responses), with a number of Boulton's comments criticized as "petty", likely meant to discredit the object of his ire. The exact nature and technologies of the mechanical print-making process used at the Soho Manufactory has been the subject of an exhibition, numerous research studies and much ongoing debate, as mechanical paintings are viewed as "one of the most intriguing products of the Soho Manufactory".) verse translations of the classics including Homer's Iliad, Virgil's Æneid and other classical works during the mid-1870s; papers on metaphysics from the late 1870s, and as well two pamphlets on solar energy written in the early 1890s. He earned over a dozen patents for multiple inventions, many of them for aircraft propulsion systems. At least one patent was assigned to George Westinghouse, Jr, the American industrial tycoon.

His financial independence allowed him not to pursue any particular career aggressively. He was described as reclusive to the point that his "wide knowledge and sterling qualities were known only to a few". While others of wealth and ability often sought greater wealth, notability and positions of power, Boulton was to eventually become notable for being unnotable. In his lifetime he had "...no wish to attract the attention of his contemporaries".

Kenyon College Professor of History Bruce Kinzer's 2009 biographic sketch of Boulton, possibly the only one ever published, posited that "Boulton has not posthumously gained the recognition he never sought during his lifetime." The philosopher-scientist-inventor's non-notability extended to missing entries in Boase's Modern English Biography, the Dictionary of National Biography (where he was one of only five members of the Metaphysical Society who did not appear in it) and the later Oxford Dictionary of National Biography.

However other researchers have on occasion drawn attention to the Boulton's achievements, pointed to in 1911 in Britain's leading aviation magazine, Flight ("Two Interesting Patents"), and later by aviation historian C. H. Gibbs-Smith ("The First Aileron"). Boulton's flight control device, first described in his 1868 patent, "Aerial Locomotion, &c", was publicly praised by the pioneering U.S. aeronautical engineer Charles Manly. While addressing the Society of Automotive Engineers in 1916, Manly referred directly to Boulton's invention, telling his audience:

... the system of lateral balancing or control now so universally used; [is] that of supplementary planes, now called ailerons. The description he gave of these in his British patent was thorough and clear. It is the first record we have of appreciation of the necessity for active lateral control as distinguished from the passive lateral equilibrium secured by having wings set at a dihedral angle. With this invention of Boulton's we have the birth of the present-day three torque method of airborne control. The only thing then lacking [in 1868] to enable man to learn to operate flying machines was the one great organ – a suitable engine.

In his lifetime Boulton was likely better noted for his membership in the eclectic Metaphysical Society, a short-lived association (1869–1880) of some of Britain's most gifted philosophers, theologians, academics and political leaders, although "[n]o member of the Metaphysical Society knew less renown than M.P.W. Boulton". He was elected to the society in 1874. Nevertheless, the former and future British Prime Minister and society member William Gladstone, who chaired its 9 April 1878 meeting at the Grosvenor Hotel, read Boulton's philosophical treatise Has a Metaphysical Society Any Raison d'être? (Does a metaphysical society have any reason to exist?) to the assembled membership that evening. It included, in part:

"[B]efore ... breaking up our society, let us consider the matter a little further ..." "There is no question, however apparently non-metaphysical, which may not be pursued till we come to the Metaphysical. The question of whether Tarquin lived, and whether Lucretia committed suicide, is about as non-metaphysical as any question can be: yet disputants engaged in its discussion may persist till they open up the general question of the credibility of testimony; and this may open that of the credibility of memory, the nature of belief, what grounds we have for believing the existence of other persons, and an external world ... Whenever we try to bottom a question or subject, to use Locke's word (the French word would be "approfondir") then Metaphysics come in sight ... Every sentence involves, in some shape or other, the verb "to be", and this, if pursued long enough, leads to the heart of Metaphysics ... Scientific persons often speak of Metaphysics with scorn, calling them an Asylum Ignorantiae, useful enough to the vulgar, but in no way needed by themselves. They imagine their science to be perfectly luminous, far above the lower regions where Metaphysical mists prevail. But in reality they share the common lot: the ideas of Force, Law, Cause, Substance, Causal or Active Matter, all dwell in the region of metaphysical twilight, not in the luminous ether."

The work was described by Alan Brown as a "brilliant paper", ultimately leading to the beginning of the end of the Society, its "kiss of death". According to Catherine Hajdenko-Marshall, Boulton's paper argued that in free and open societies, "the plurality of ideas meant that debate was [essentially] impossible". But, apparently, despite its importance to the Society, Boulton may not have attended the reading of his own work.

== Death and legacy ==
M. P. W. Boulton died in London on 30 June 1894 at age 73. (Note: Boulton headstone is in the churchyard of Great Tew's St Michael & All Angels. At the time of his death his residence was listed as the Wehrspon's Hotel, 7 & 8 Cork Street, Burlington Gardens, Middlesex. His estate had a final valuation of £71,056, 16s, 4d as stated in January 1896 and compiled by Lionel Boulton Campbell Lockhart Muirhead Esq. and William Chauncey Cartwright Esq. CB.) This was soon noted by The Times which wrote in his obituary that he was:

... a most gifted member of a gifted family, the inheritor of a large fortune, and highly cultured; but, being naturally a recluse, with no care for self-assertion, his wide knowledge and sterling qualities were known only to a few

After Boulton's death his eldest son Matthew retained the Great Tew Estate until his own death, still single, in 1914, after which the estate fell into general disrepair, unused for a number of decades. Boulton's great-nephew Major Eustace Robb renovated the estate and lived there from 1952 until his demise in 1985.

=== Tribute ===
Boulton Peak is a mountain summit at the southeast side of Curtiss Bay, about 9 kilometres (5.6 mi) south of Cape Andreas in Antarctica. It was mapped from air photos taken between 1955 and 1957 and named by the UK Antarctic Place-Names Committee in 1960 to honour Boulton for his invention of the aileron.

== Aeronautical works ==
In 1868, long before the advent of powered aircraft flight – and within a decade of the birth of both Orville and Wilbur Wright – Boulton patented the first aileron. (Note: The name "aileron", (from French, meaning "little wing", also refers to the extremities of a bird's wings used to control their flight) did not appear until about 1908. Prior to that ailerons were often referred to the same as their older technical sibling, rudders, and more descriptively as horizontal rudders, or in French, gouvernails horizontaux. Among the word's earliest printed use in the context of aviation was that in the French aviation journal L'Aérophile in 1908. The description in Boulton's patent therefore did not employ aileron, instead using its precursor, rudder (similar to speaking telegraphs in the early history of the telephone). His 1868 patent, No. 392, was titled Aërial Locomotion &c (Aerial Locomotion etcetera), its full introductory description reading "... for the invention of Improvements in Propulsion and in Aerial Locomotion, and in Apparatus connected therewith, Parts of which are applicable to Projectiles and to Boilers". The completed patent document is of 20 pages length with an attached drawing sheet, and among the several inventions it details is, near its end, his aileron flight control system (see gallery images).) The aileron system he created was to be actuated by either a hand-operated control (not illustrated on the patent's drawings) or by an automatic pendulum control device (depicted on the patent's drawing sheet), with the intended function of a single-axis autopilot. Boulton's inspiration for a lateral flight control device has been attributed to French Count Ferdinand Charles Honore Phillipe d'Esterno, whose detailed analysis of flapping and soaring bird flight, Du Vol des Oiseaux (On the flight of birds) was published as a pamphlet in 1864. Although Boulton's prescient aileron control system was fully functional, he, as did almost everyone of his era, lacked a detailed understanding of aerodynamics, and an airplane he designed never achieved flight. (Note: Almost all early airplane builders were hindered by a fundamental lack of understanding of aerodynamics. One of the earliest professional wind tunnels would not be installed until 1901, at Catholic University of America.)

Ailerons are a key device for the lateral flight control of airplanes to enable their safe flight. They are still in almost universal use in the present day by civilian and military aircraft, and even on the most sophisticated jetliners. (Note: Airships, lighter-than-air balloons and helicopters do not use ailerons. Buoyant aircraft travel so slowly they do not need them, and helicopters achieve lateral flight control by manipulating their rotor discs.) In 1873, five years after Boulton's aileron patent, the French military engineer and aircraft designer Charles Renard built and flew at St.-Eloi, near Arras, a small unmanned multi-wing glider incorporating ailerons (which he termed "winglets") on each side of its body, controlled by Boulton's pendulum control single-axis autopilot device with a design layout that closely matched the patent. (Note: Renard's unmanned glider flight test from a 66-metre-tall tower at Tour Saint-Eloi, near Arras, was unsuccessful, although the pendulum device did function, but not as intended. Instead of reacting to the Earth's gravity and maintaining level flight, the pendulum obeyed the centrifugal force generated in reaction to its first corrective response, subsequently entering a spiral descent. While its ailerons were projected independently out of the glider's body below its wings, the glider's multi-wing design was based on that of Francis Herbert Wenham's.)

Boulton's Letter's Patent specifications were sealed on 4 August 1868 and the complete patent was backdated to its application date of 5 February 1868. His British patent, the 392nd one completed in 1868, was issued more than 35 years before ailerons were 'reinvented' in France, and ailerons were later repatented in the United States by Glenn Curtiss of the Aerial Experiment Association in about 1911. (Note: Glenn Hammond Curtiss (1878–1930), who started in the motorcycle engine business, became an early leading aircraft designer and manufacturer after being introduced to and joining Dr. Alexander Graham Bell's Aerial Experiment Association in 1907. The association recognized the need for ailerons early on their prototype airplanes and first added them to their AEA White Wing in 1908. Curtiss subsequently, and unexpectedly, dropped out of the AEA, and then patented ailerons in the U.S. under his own name, creating some bitterness among AEA members.) Boulton's 1868 patent became forgotten and lost from sight until the same time, a few years before they came into general use in 1915. (Note: Aviation historian C. H. Gibbs-Smith wrote that the aileron was "... one of the most remarkable inventions ... of aeronautical history, which was immediately lost sight of".) Aviation historian C. H. Gibbs-Smith acknowledged Boulton's priority of invention, stating that if the 1868 patent had been revealed at the time of the Wright brothers' legal filings, they might not have been able to claim the priority of invention for the lateral control of flying machines.

Although Boulton had described ailerons in 1864 and then patented them in 1868, no one is known to have used them in manned aircraft flight until Robert Esnault-Pelterie's glider, 36 years later in 1904 (Renard's 1871 glider flights using pendulum controlled "winglets" were unmanned). Esnault-Pelterie, a French aeronautical engineer, built a Wright brothers-style biplane glider that year, which had first used their wing warping design that he had also copied, but the glider's control in flight was found to be poor and was then changed over to ailerons, although another source states the changeover was due to his view that wing warping was structurally dangerous.

The French journal L'Aérophile later published photos of Esnault-Pelterie's glider with its inter-wing ailerons in June 1905, and ailerons were then copied by other aircraft designers, with the interwing ailerons showing up on the final-flown revision of Alberto Santos-Dumont's 14-bis canard biplane on 12 November 1906, popularized by American pilot and aircraft designer Glenn Curtiss with his Golden Flyer first self-designed aircraft in 1909, and entering widespread use by 1915. The Wrights, having vigorously fought others using any form of lateral flight control without the payment of onerous licensing fees to them, quietly changed their aircraft flight control systems from wing warping to ailerons at that time as well. It is unknown whether Esnault-Pelterie had seen Boulton's patent or reinvented ailerons independently.

Gibbs-Smith later wrote in his 1960 opus, The Aeroplane: An Historical Survey of its Origins and Development, that "Boulton invented a method of control identical with the modern aileron control system in 1868. Had it not been overlooked, the history of the practical aeroplane would have been radically different, since it was the problem of achieving lateral stability and control that plagued the Wrights, Langley, Curtiss, and the whole "European School" 30–40 years later".

1868 Boulton patent, No. 392: Aërial Locomotion Etcetera

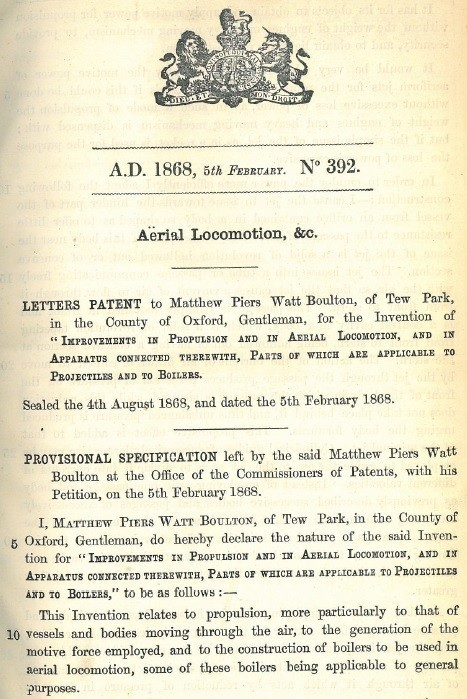
Boulton aileron patent, p. 1

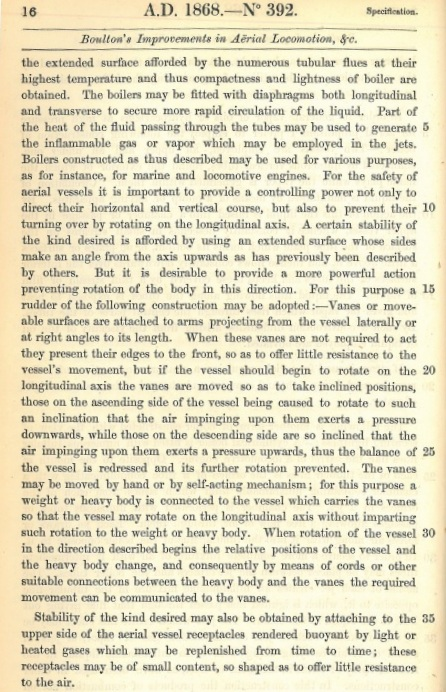
Boulton aileron patent, p. 16

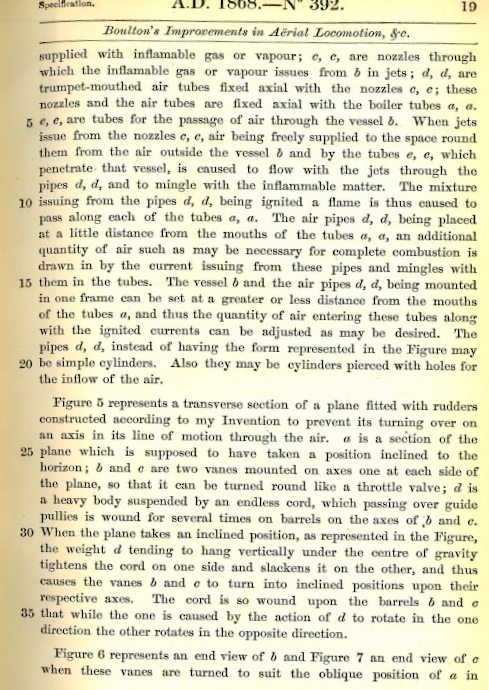
Boulton aileron patent, p. 19, description of attached drawings No. 5-7

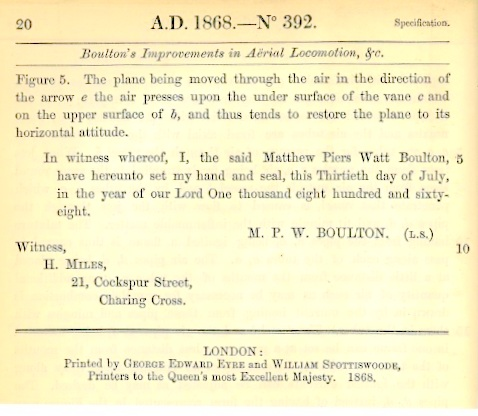
Boulton aileron patent, p. 20, description of attached drawings No. 5-7

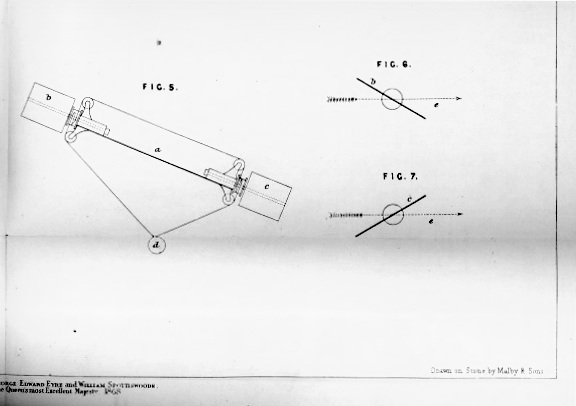
Boulton aileron patent, No. 392, attached drawing sheet, Figs. 5-7

=== Patent description of ailerons ===
Boulton's description of his aileron control system was both clear and complete. It was "the first record we have of appreciation of the necessity for active lateral control as distinguished from [passive lateral stability].... With this invention of Boulton's we have the birth of the present-day three torque method of airborne control" as was praised by Charles Manly. This was also endorsed by C. H. Gibbs-Smith.

The patent's actual wording of ailerons reads (page 16, from line 8):

For the safety of aerial vessel it is important to provide a controlling power not only to direct their horizontal and vertical course, but also to prevent their turning over by rotating on the longitudinal axis. A certain stability of the kind desired is afforded by using an extended surface whose sides make an angle from the axis upwards ... But it is desirable to provide a more powerful action preventing [rolling] rotation of the body in this direction. For this purpose a rudder of the following construction may be adopted:—Vanes or movable surfaces are attached to arms projecting from the vessel laterally or at right angles to its length. When these vanes are not required to act they present their edges to the front, so as to offer little resistance to the vessel's movement, but if the vessel should begin to rotate [roll] on the longitudinal axis the vanes are moved so as to take inclined positions, those on the ascending side of the vessel being caused to rotate to such an inclination that the air impinging upon them exerts a pressure downwards, while those on the descending side are so inclined that the air impinging upon them exerts a pressure upwards, thus the balance of the vessel is redressed and its further rotation prevented. The vanes may be moved by hand or by self-acting mechanism.....

Three figures (No. 5–7) of his aileron system were provided on the patent's attached drawing sheet, and on page 19 his explanation of the drawings reads (page 19, from line 22):

Figure 5 represents a transverse section of a plane fitted with rudders constructed according to my Invention to prevent its turning over on an axis in its line of motion through the air. a is a section of the plane which is supposed to have taken a position inclined to the horizon; b and c are two vanes mounted on axes one at each side of the plane, so that it can be turned round like a throttle valve...."

Nowhere in the patent is there a description of mounting the ailerons on the trailing edges of the airplane's wings, where they would have induced adverse yaw, but only "... on arms projecting from the vessel laterally". Indeed, the first ailerons used by Robert Esnault-Pelterie in 1904 were mounted inter-wing, not on the trailing edges of the glider's wings where they would have created unequal aileron drag.

=== Ongoing controversy ===
There are still conflicting claims today over who first invented the aileron. Other 19th century engineers and scientists, including Charles Renard, Alphonse Pénaud, and Louis Mouillard, had described similar flight control surfaces, possibly serving as further inspiration to Boulton aside from Count d'Esterno. Another technique for lateral flight control, wing warping, was also described or experimented with by several people including Jean-Marie Le Bris, John Montgomery, Clement Ader, Edson Gallaudet, D. D. Wells, and Hugo Mattullath. Aviation historian C. H. Gibbs-Smith wrote that the aileron was "... one of the most remarkable inventions ... of aeronautical history, which was immediately lost sight of".

In an apparent oversight by the U.S. Patent Office, the Wright brothers, on their second attempt, obtained a patent in 1906, not for the invention of an airplane (which had already existed for a number of decades in the form of gliders) but for the invention of a system of aerodynamic control that manipulated a flying machine's surfaces, including lateral flight control. They did so despite rudders, elevators and ailerons having been invented long before their efforts began, and then aggressively sued other aircraft builders worldwide for failure to pay them licensing royalties on the basis of the lateral flight control described in their expansive 1906 patent. Irrespective of such controversies it was Boulton, indisputably, who was the first to patent ailerons in 1868. The ailerons used by Esnault-Pelterie in 1904 followed Boulton's concept, although it is unknown whether he had studied the 1868 work, or if he had reinvented them independently.

=== Other aeronautical, gas turbine and engine design research ===
In 1864 Boulton looked at the problems of combustion at constant pressure, in connection with the operation of an industrial gas turbine. His British patent, No. 1636 of 1864, contains points of interest. He realized that the high velocity of the gas jet exiting his combustion chamber nozzle offered a practical difficulty, and proposed to remedy this by the use of successive induced jets of increasing volume and consequently lower velocity. This was shown in his drawing, with gases being delivered through collinear nozzles of increasing diameter, with the outer nozzles operating at increased gas volumes with reduced velocities, similar to the exhaust of a high-bypass turbofan jet engine.

Another method proposed by Boulton for maintaining combustion at constant pressure was shown with gas burned in an inverted chamber under water, the products of combustion passing up through the water between the baffle plates and the mixed gases and steam being later delivered to a turbine. He went on to file a number of patents related to his gas turbine research (see patents).

Boulton also attempted to build an ornithopter, an aircraft which would create lift by the movement of its articulating wings. A manned ornithopter was later created in 2006 when teams at the University of Toronto Institute for Aerospace Studies (UTIAS) achieved a working design with large flapping wing areas. With assist from a jet engine it only flew for about 300 meters on its only flight.

=== Family connection to other aviation works ===
Besides Boulton's invention of a primary flight control, the aileron, the family name may also be associated with the well known British firm that provided wartime aircraft production as Boulton Paul Aircraft. Boulton Paul Aircraft Ltd was a British aircraft manufacturer that was created in 1934, although its start in aircraft manufacturing began earlier in 1914, and lasted until 1961. The company mainly built and modified aircraft under contract to other manufacturers, but had a few notable designs of its own, such as the Boulton Paul Defiant.

The company's origins date back to a Norwich ironmonger's shop founded in 1797. William Staples Boulton joined the Norfolk ironworks firm of Moore & Barnard in 1844. By 1870 William had been elevated to a partner and the firm was renamed to Barnard & Boulton, later becoming Boulton & Paul Ltd. The latter firm began its construction engineering division in 1905. In the early 1900s, Boulton & Paul became a successful general manufacturing firm, also starting an aircraft production operation in 1914–1915. The aircraft manufacturing division was spun off from the main construction business in 1934, subsequently moving to Wolverhampton.

== Published works ==
=== Works under his name ===
Boulton's known works under his name include:

- Essay on the Decline and Fall of the Persian Empire (awarded the Eton Prize, 1839), 1839.
- "Epigrammata numismate annuo dignata" in Prolusiones Academicae praemiis annuiis dignatae et in Curia Cantabrigiensi recitatae Comitiis Maximis, 1828–1842, 15 parts, Joannes Smith and J. C. Parker: Cantabrigae, 1828–42, part for 1841.
- Remarks on Some Evidence Recently Communicated to the Photographic Society, 1863.
- Remarks Concerning Certain Photographs Supposed to be of Early Date, London: Bradbury and Evans, 1864.
- Remarks Concerning Certain Pictures Supposed to be Photographs of Early Date (revised), London; Bradbury and Evans, 1865.
- Translations of Book I of Homer's Iliad; also passages from Virgil, Aristophanes, Moschus, and Catullus (in verse), London: Chapman and Hall, 1875.
- Translation of the Sixth Book of Virgil's Aeneid and Book VIII, lines 652–713 (in verse), London: Chapman and Hall, 1877.
- Has a Metaphysical Society Any Raison d'être? (Does a metaphysical society have any reason to exist? —a paper read before the Metaphysical Society), London, 1878.
- Songs from Heine and other Pieces (translated into English Verse by M. P. W. Boulton), 1880.
- Considerations on the Subject of Solar Heat, London: Chapman and Hall, 1890.
- On Solar or Stellar Heat, London: Chapman and Hall, 1891.

=== Pseudonymous works ===
Although no definitive proof is known to exist that Boulton was also published under the pen name M. P. W. Bolton, researcher and author Alan Brown wrote in The Metaphysical Society: Victorian Minds in Crisis, 1869–1880, that Boulton was also sometimes spelt as 'Bolton'. Brown was perhaps convinced of that since no biographical information exists for any 'M. P. W. Bolton', Bolton was, in fact, Boulton's pseudonymous pen name. (Note: M. P. W. Bolton's entry in the Dictionary of Nineteenth-Century British Philosophers possesses no biographic data for the person, stating tersely "About M.P.W. Bolton's biography nothing seems to be known", thereafter merely summarizing Bolton's philosophical attacks on William Hamilton and Henry Longueville Mansel.) Somewhat intriguingly, Boulton's younger brother, Montagu Boulton (1824–1849), was admitted to Cambridge University's Inner Temple (a law society) as "Matthew Bolton" in October 1844. (Note: Boulton's younger brother, Montagu Boulton (b. Tew Park, Oxfordshire 1824 – d. Multan, India 1849), was educated at Eton and admitted to Trinity College at Cambridge on 15 April 1842. He was killed as a spectator at the Siege of Multan in India. The reason for the use of his father's given name and the alternate spelling of his family name when he was registered is unknown.) Additionally, M. P. W.'s distant ancestors' surnames omitted the 'u', from their spelling. That included John Bolton of Lichfield, Staffordshire, who is believed descended from, possibly a grandson of Robert Bolton (1572–1631), rector of Broughton, Northamptonshire.

Under the alternate 'Bolton' spelling the British Museum lists several philosophical works (all published by Chapman & Hall, which had also published most of Boulton's works), including:

- Examination of the Principles of the Scoto-Oxonian (1861);
- Reply to a critique in the Saturday review on the Scoto-Oxonian philosophy (1862);
- Letter to T. Collyns Simon, Esq., Author of The Philosophical Answer to Essays and Reviews (1863);
- Inquisitio Philosophica: An Examination of the Principles of Kant and Hamilton (1866);
- Examination of the Principles of the Scoto-Oxonian Philosophy: with Replies to Objectors (1869).

Several of the Bolton writings fiercely attacked the theological positions expounded by Scottish philosopher Sir William Hamilton and the metaphysician Henry Longueville Mansel, who both argued that God was "infinite" and "absolute". One possible reason for the alternate pen name in confronting authority figures may then have been that of deniability. An edition of John Stuart Mill's Examination of Sir William Hamilton's Philosophy later led the English political radical George Grote to examine Bolton's Inquisitio Philosophica, and prompted Mill to write that its author "is a scholar, well read in history of philosophy and.... [shows] that he holds with the inductive school, both in their philosophy and in its consequences". Mills thought the work's author an "acute thinker" and Inquisitio an "able work".

Kinzer's examination of the same work led him to a firmer belief that Bolton and Boulton were also one and the same. Additionally, a letter by an M. P. W. Bolton is archived at Trinity College, Cambridge, although a biographical work listing all of the university's known students has no record of any such person, only that of Boulton. Examination of other letters written by both Bolton and Boulton also hold that their handwriting scripts closely resemble each other.

== Patents ==
Subject to various international agreements, patents filed in one country were normally also valid in the other contracting states which participated in them. Boulton's patents include (UK, unless otherwise specified):

Date	No.	Patent name	Remarks & source
1864	1099	In connection with the mode of working steam and caloric engines to employ that portion of heat which is generated by combustion of the fuel.	
1864	1291	Improvements in engines worked by heated air or gases mixed with steam.	
1864	1636	Improvements in obtaining motive power from aeriform fluids.	
1864-11-04	2738	Obtaining motive power from steam and aeriform fluids and liquids	
1864-12-06	3044	Obtaining motive power from steam and aeriform fluids and liquids	
1865-02-22	501	Obtaining motive-power from äeroform fluids	
1865-03-23	827	Obtaining motive-power from äeroform fluids	
1865-06-15	1622	Generating steam	
1865-07-22	1915	Obtaining motive-power when heated air äeroform fluid is employed	
1865-08-01	1992	Obtaining motive-power by heat	
1865-08-07	2051	Improvements in generating steam and heating steam and äeriform fluids	
1866	738	Generating and applying heat for the production of motive power and steam	
1866-09-26	2489	Apparatus for employing the motive power of jets of fluid (Propelling aerial vessels)	
1866	2809	Propelling aerial vessels	
1867	696	Propelling vessels	
1868-02-05	392	Aërial Locomotion etcetera	
1868-03-24	1005	Improvements in means and apparatus for effecting aerial locomotion (Propelling vessels)	with co-patenttee John Imray
1868	1233	Apparatus for receiving motion or energy from fluids, and for imparting it to them	
1868-06-19	1988	Improvements in apparatus for obtaining motive power by the combustion of inflammable äeroform fluids	
1868-12-04	3694	Improvements in rotary propellers, pumps and fans	
1869	738	(title unknown)	£50 stamp fee paid
1869	3694	(title unknown)	with co-patenttee John Imray. Complete specification filed.
1875	1875	Generator	
1876	2288	Improvements in apparatus whereby combustion under pressure is applied to generate fluid for working engines	
1876	3620	Improvements in engines worked by the combustion and expansive force of an inflammable fluid mixture	
1876	3767	Improvements in apparatus for the production of motive power jointly by the elastic force of products of combustion, and of steam or vapour	
1876-11-08	184,952	Improvement in Rotary Pumps	U.S. patent, with John Imray, co-patenttee, assigned to George Westinghouse, Jr., Pennsylvania
1877-02-24	765	Improvements in the Apparatus for producing heat by the combustion of inflammable gases or vapours	
1878	766	Generating gaseous fluids for working engines	Engines worked by air and gas or combustion of mixed gaseous fluids (Improvements in engines worked by products of combustion either alone or in conjunction with other elastic fluid)
1878	2525	Improvements in gas motor engines (provisional only) (Ignition apparatus for gas-engines)	Gas-engines; working same with mixed fluids: cooling cylinders and utilising heat generated
1878	2609	Improvements in gas motor engines (provisional only) (Ignition apparatus for gas-engines)	Gas-engines; working same with mixed fluids: cooling cylinders and utilising heat generated
1878	2278	Generating hydro-carbon vapours for working	Gas-engines, working same with mixed fluids; cooling cylinders; utilising heat generated, Boulton Cooling of gas-motor engines
1878	2325	(Cooling of gas-motor engines)	
1878	2609	(Cooling of gas-motor engines)	
1878	2707	Improvements in combined gas and steam motor engines (Valves and ignition apparatus for gas-engines)	Combined gas and steam-engine; cooling cylinder; utilising heat generated Cooling of gas-motor engines Rotating disc, for gas-motor engines
1878	4516	(Caloric engine with fan or "alternator"; heating and compressing air for same)	
1878-11-09	4550	Refrigeration-apparatus for cooling air or fluid by expansion of air, &c.	Drying air of fluid for refrigerating-apparatus. Condensed from the Journals of the Commissioners of Patents, p. 4550: Provisional Protection for Six Months.
1878	(unknown)	Refrigeration	Condensed from the Journals of the Commissioners of Patents, p. 4550: Notice of Intention to Proceed with Patents.
1879	495	Improvements in caloric engines	
1881	1202	Improvements in caloric engines wherein the working fluid is heated by internal combustion of gas	
1881	1389	Improvements in caloric engines wherein the working fluid is heated by internal combustion of gas	
1881	3367	Improvements in engines wherein a piston is propelled in a cylinder by ignition of inflammable gas or fluid	
1885-01-20	311,102	Caloric Engine	U.S. patent, with Edward Perrett, co-patenttee
1885-02-24	312,959	Superheated-Steam Engine	U.S. patent, with Edward Perrett, co-patenttee. Patented in England 1883-12-18 as No. 5,797, and also in France, Belgium and Italy under separate identifiers.
1886	2653	Combined steam and gas engines	joint Boulton & Perrett patent
1886-07-06	345,026	Employing Steam for Producing Motive Power	U.S. patent. Patented in England 1884-11-06 as No. 14,684.

== See also ==
- Wright brothers patent war
