= Louis Pierre Mouillard =

French aviation pioneer (1834–1897)

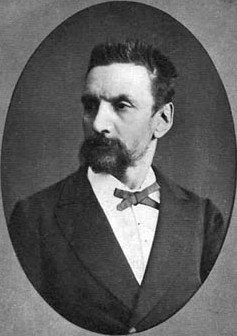
Portrait published posthumously in 1912

Louis Pierre Mouillard (September 30, 1834 – September 20, 1897) was a French artist and innovator who worked on human mechanical flight in the second half of the 19th century. He based much of his work on the investigation of birds in Algeria and Cairo. Around the early 1900s he was considered the father of aviation.

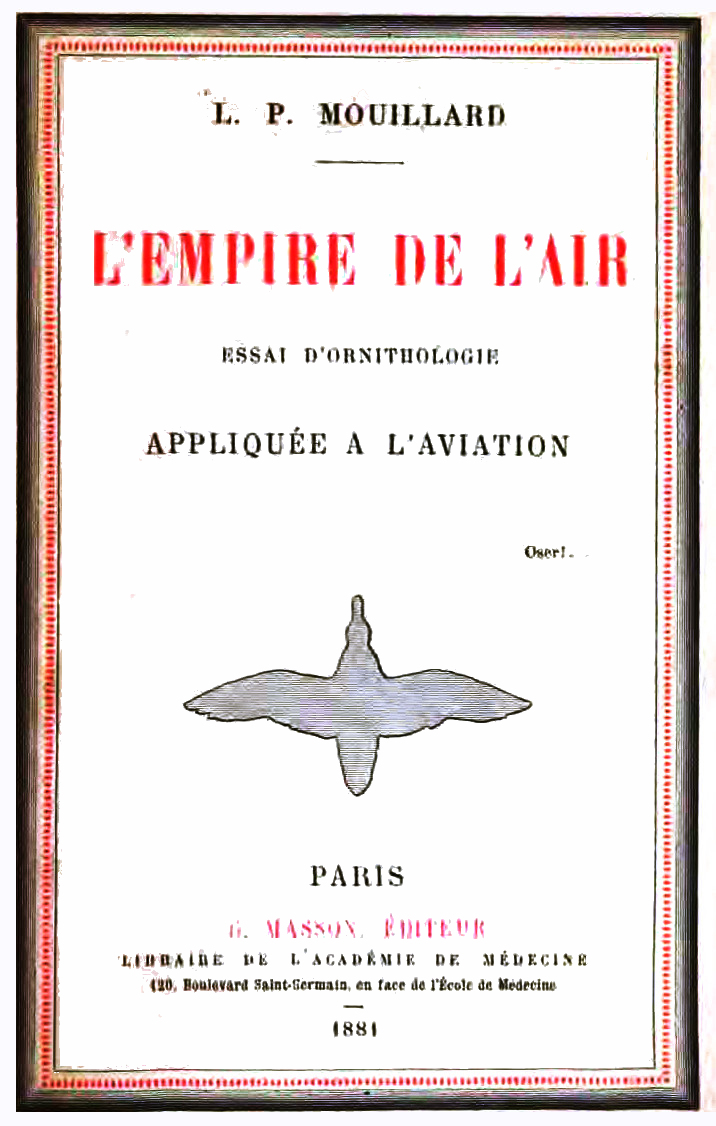
Cover of L'Empire de l'Air (1881) with "Oser!" above and to the right of the bird outline

Mouillard's most famous work, L'Empire de l'Air, in which he proposed fixed-wing gliders, was published in France in 1881 and soon became a widely recognized classic. It was translated into English by the Smithsonian Institution in their annual report of 1892 and reprinted in 1893 as The Empire Of The Air.

== Biography ==
Mouillard studied at the School of Fine Arts at Lyon and Paris but settled in Algeria at Mitidja after the death of his father. Here he constructed several gliders before returning to France in 1865. Around this time he managed to glide 138 feet at about 30 feet height. He also described the use of a screw to provide lift and propulsion to a glider in 1890. He was appointed a professor of drawing at the Cairo Polytechnic in 1866 during which time he took a lot of interest in the flight of vultures. He studied the requirements of gliding flight in birds. In 1897 his design was patented in the United States of America by Octave Chanute. His biographer Arthur Henry Couannier posthumously published a book on gliding flight in 1912 titled Le vol sans battement (flight without flapping). He foresaw the use of aluminium as the metal of choice for aircraft and was possibly the first - with the possible exception of British engineer M.P.W. Boulton in 1868 - to introduce control surfaces to the wing.

Mouillard realized the importance of wings, gliding and the future of aviation at a time when balloons were considered the only practical way to carry humans and flapping machines had failed. He inspired the work of many others including Octave Chanute and Otto Lilienthal. Mouillard was described by Wilbur Wright as one of the greatest missionaries of the flying cause. Mouillard believed that flight would unify the world, that the empire of the air would be for all humanity to own and that it would eliminate the need for boundaries and armies. He has been termed as a utopian:

C'est même la suppression, dans un temps très court, des nationalités: les races seront rapidement mélangées ou détruites, car il n'y aura plus de barrières possibles, pas même ces barrières mouvantes qui se nomment les armées. Plus de frontières!... plus d'îles!... plus de forteresses!... où allons-nous? Il faut bien avouer que nous sommes en face de la plus large expression de l'inconnu ... Nous pouvons donc nous rasséréner et contempler ce but avec calme: ce phare, c'est cette immense loi de la nature qui se nomme le progrès; et progrès est synonyme de bien.

Translated: "This will result in the rapid removal of nationalities: races will be mixed or quickly destroyed, as there will be no barriers, not even these moving barriers that are called armies. No more borders! ... or islands! ... or fortresses! ... Where are we going? We must admit that we are facing the great unknown [...] But we can reassure ourselves of the results, this is the law of nature we call progress, and progress is synonymous with good."

Mouillard died, largely unrecognized and in poverty, at Cairo in 1897. In February 1912 a statue was erected in Cairo to his memory. The statue was made by Guillaume Laplagne and was erected on a black basalt base and was located near the Heliopolis Grand Hotel but this no longer exists. The base of the pedestal bears the word Oser! meaning "dare" which he had printed on the cover of his book. The vulture in front of the pedestal is based on his illustration used in his 1881 book. Rue Pierre-Mouillard is a Paris street named in his honour.

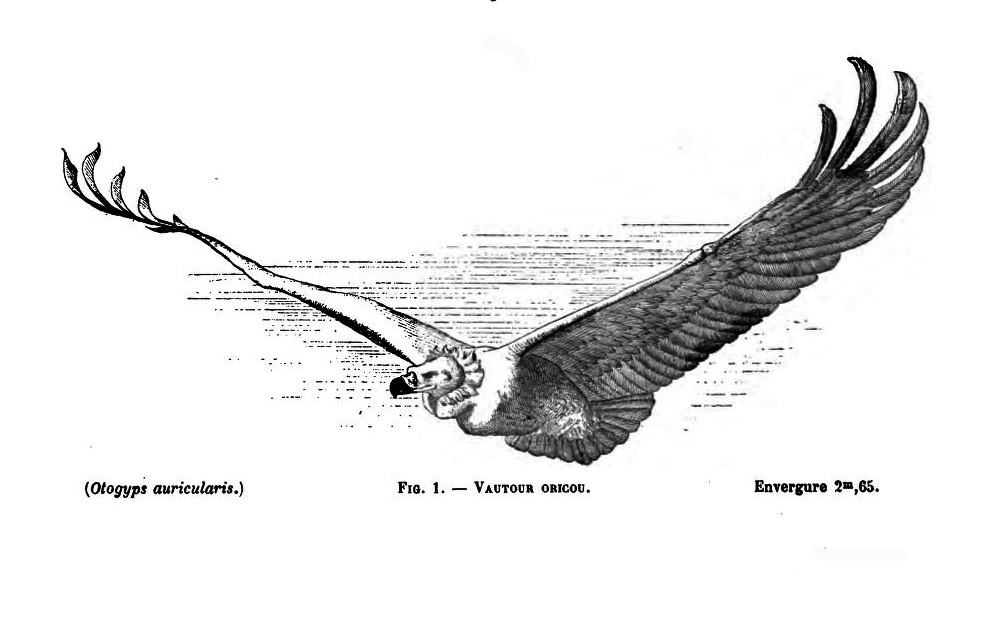
Vulture inspiration

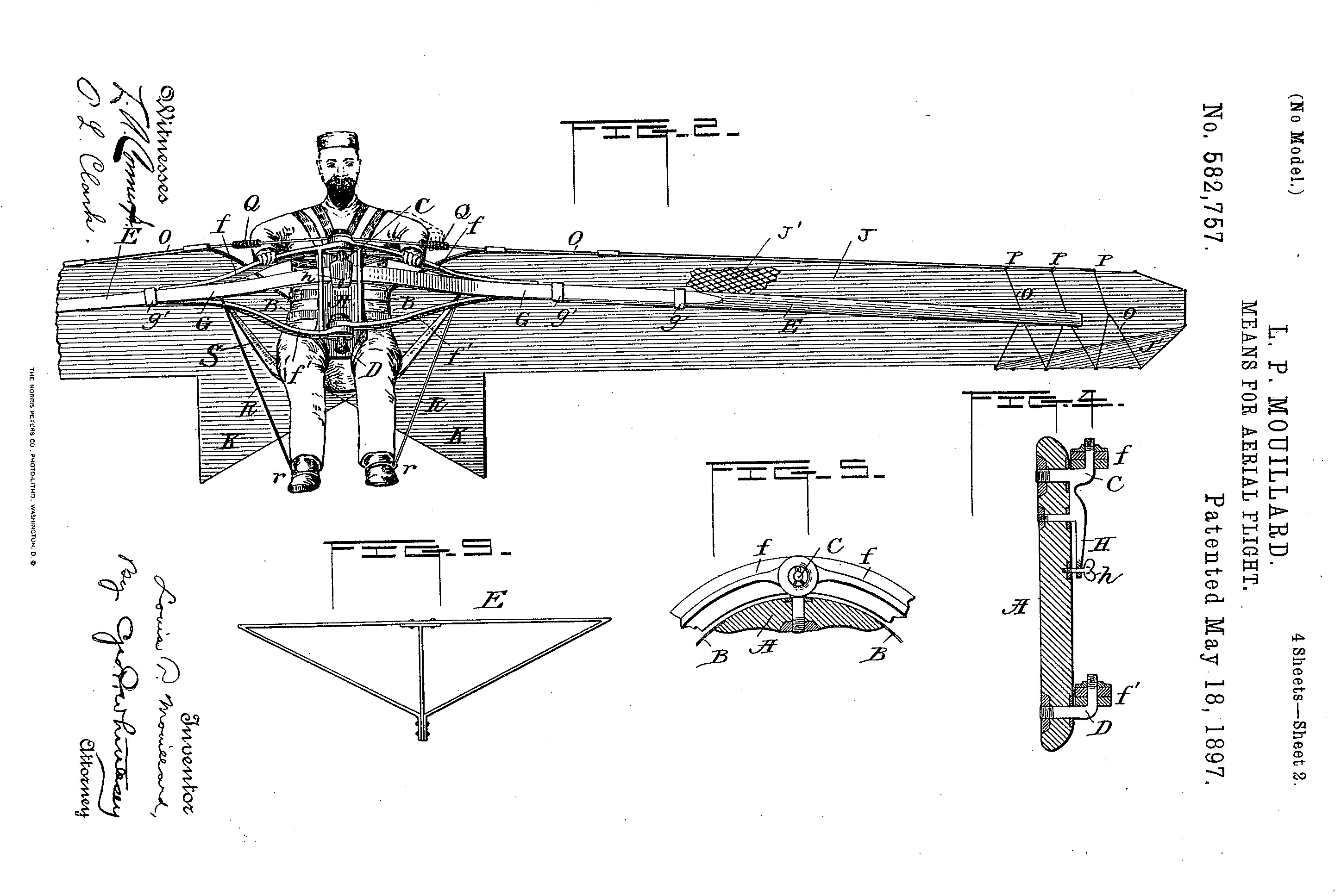
1897 patent

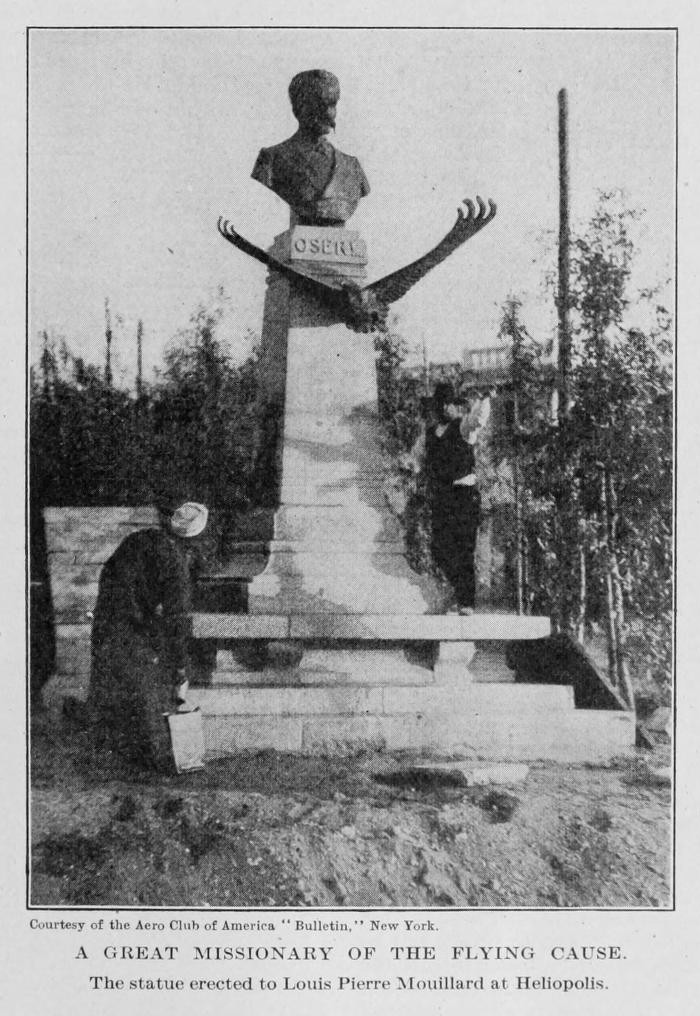
Memorial at Cairo in 1912

== See also ==
- List of early flying machines
