= Matthew Robinson Boulton =

English manufacturer (1770–1842)

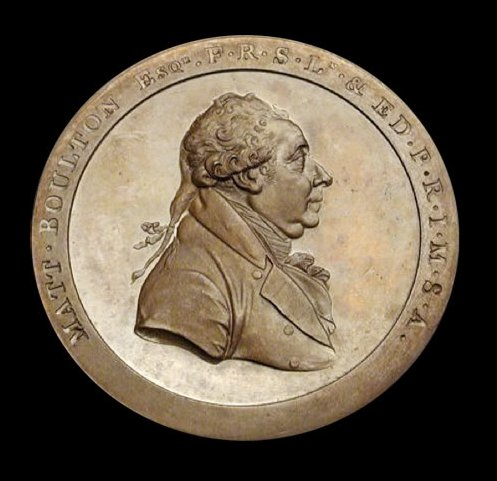
Matthew Robinson Boulton medal struck at the Soho Foundry, Smethwick, West Midlands, England, c. 1803.

Matthew Robinson Boulton (8 August 1770 – 16 May 1842) was an English manufacturer, a pioneer of management, the son of Matthew Boulton and the father of Matthew Piers Watt Boulton, who first patented the aileron. He was responsible with James Watt Jr. for the management of the Soho Foundry.

As a boy, Boulton was sent by his father to France to absorb French culture and technical knowledge and, later, to pass along information on political developments there. After returning to England, he was mainly involved in the initial planning of the foundry, with James Watt Jr. being more concerned with daily management and organisation.

Matthew's wife was Mary Ann Wilkinson (1795-1829), the daughter of William Wilkinson, and niece of John Wilkinson. John Wilkinson developed the precision boring technique required for the Boulton & Watt steam engines at Bersham Ironworks in 1774, and the two Wilkinson brothers as partners had the contract to manufacture the cylinders and other castings until the 1790s. John and William fell out in the early 1790s, and William developed close ties with the Boulton and Watt company. Mary Anne had seven children.

== Sources ==
- Williams, Robert (1995), Accounting for steam: The accounts of the Soho factory, Accounting & Finance Working Papers, vol. 95/14, Wollongong, NSW: University of Wollongong
