= Stori Brymbo =

Heritage centre in Brymbo, Wrexham, Wales

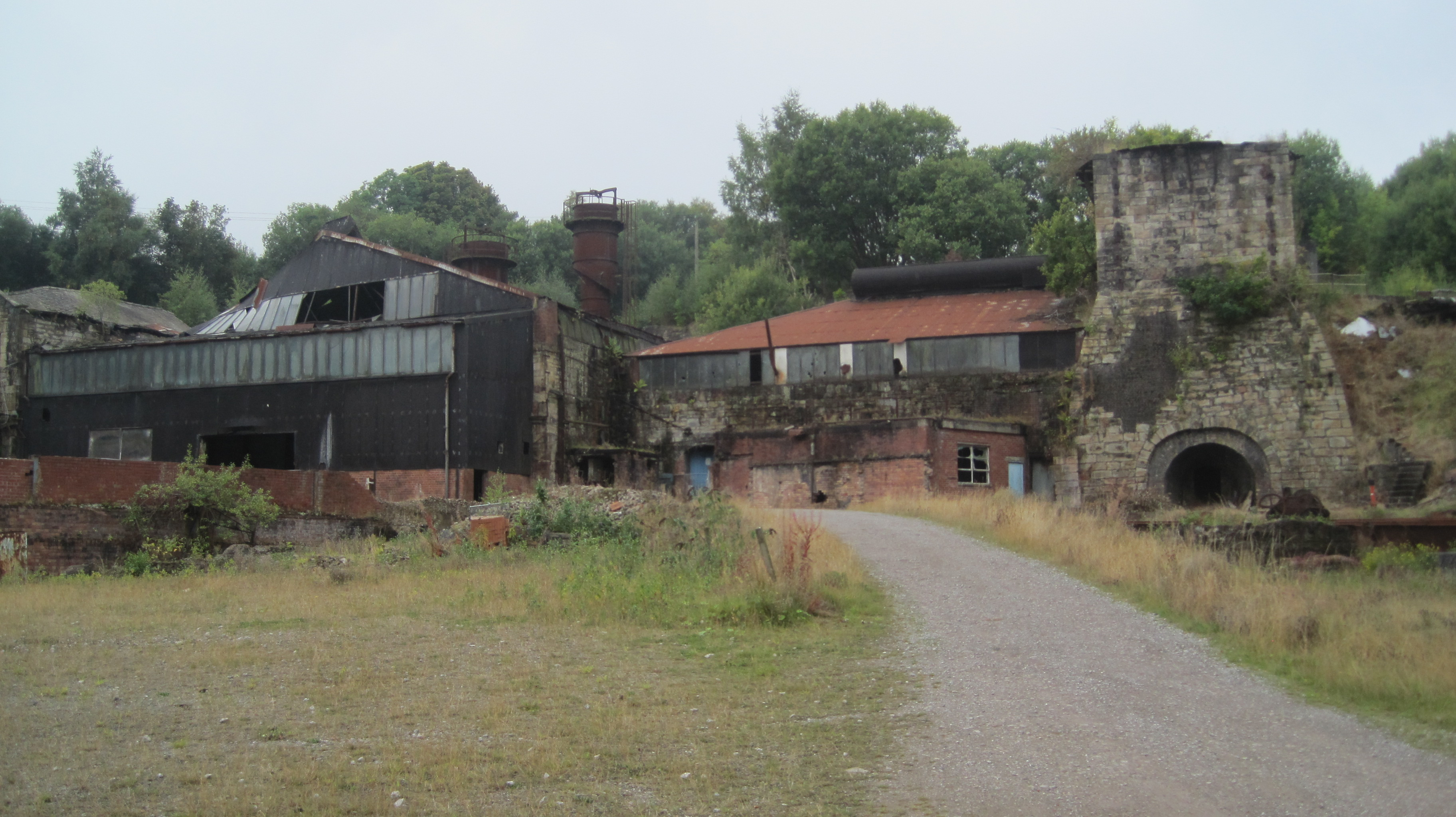
- Former steelworks buildings in 2013, prior to re-development.
- Established: July 6, 2026; 2 months ago
- Location: Brymbo, Wrexham County Borough, Wales
- Coordinates: 53.073725°N 3.053566°W
- Type: Community heritage centre
- Key holdings: Brymbo Fossil Forest
- Owner: Brymbo Heritage Trust
- Website: storibrymbo.co.uk

Scheduled monument
- Official name: Brymbo Ironworks: Early Blast Furnace, Cast House & Foundry
- Designated: 7 November 1991
- Reference no.: DE202

Listed Building – Grade II*
- Official name: Former Agent's House at site of Brymbo Ironworks
- Designated: 25 October 1991
- Reference no.: 1731

Stori Brymbo (Welsh for '[the] Brymbo story') is a heritage centre in Brymbo, Wrexham, North Wales. Located on the site of the former Brymbo Steelworks, it encompasses old buildings of the steelworks and the Brymbo Fossil Forest, a site of special scientific interest containing fossils from more than 300 million years ago.

A heritage project to develop the former steelworks site first received funding in 2013, with further funding awarded in 2017. The council approved the project's hopes to bid for lottery funding in 2020, with it receiving £10 million by 2024. Planning permission was granted and work began in mid 2024, for a summer 2026 opening. It opened in July 2026.

The attraction includes a visitor centre, a cafe, art and retail space, an exhibition space and a building to view excavations of the fossil forest. The site's Grade II* former agent’s house, scheduled monument-designated pattern makers' workshop and 1920s machine shop would also be developed. While a community parkland called the "Lodge Valley Park" would also be developed nearby on the other side of Phoenix Drive.

== History ==
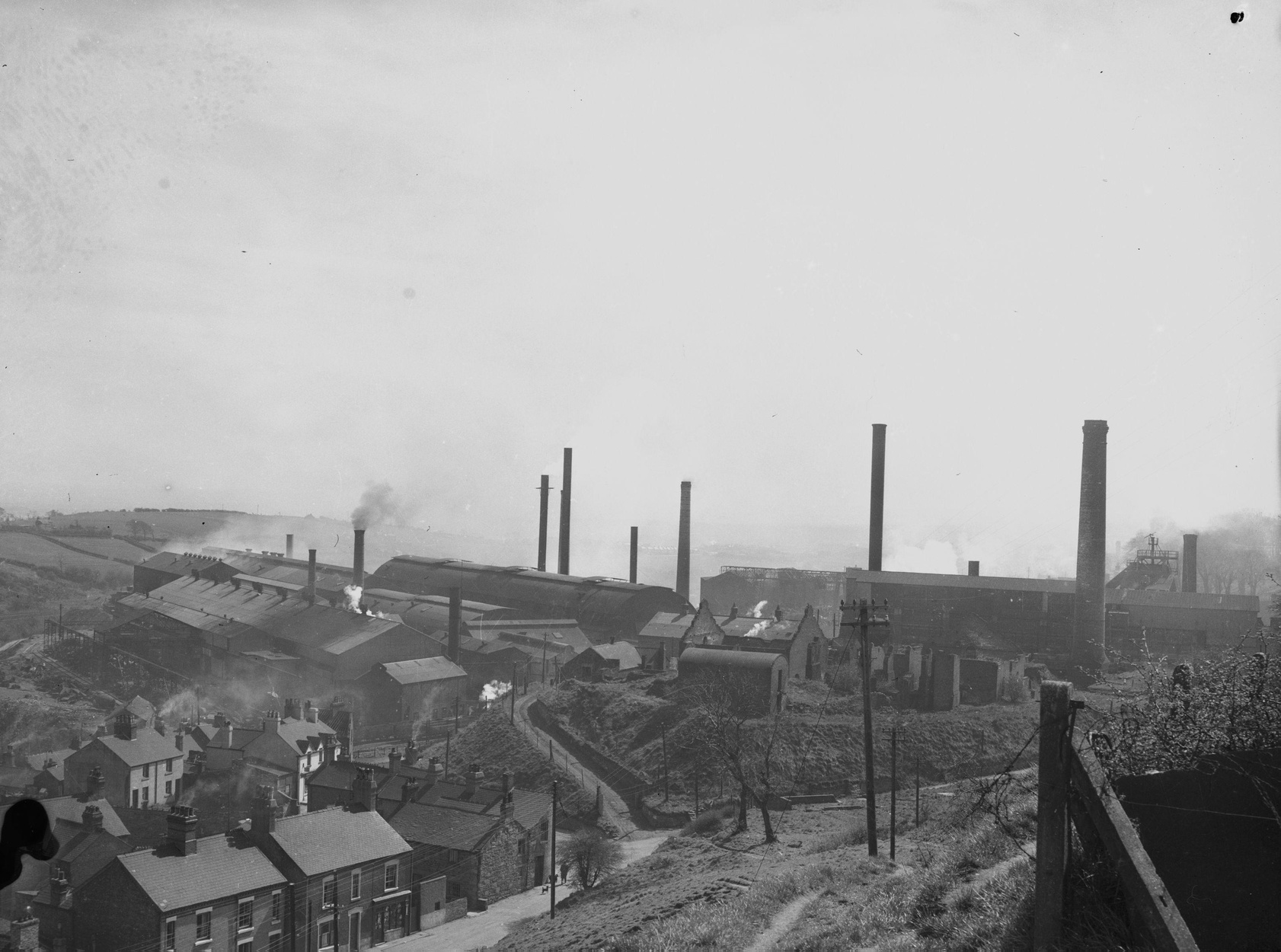
Brymbo Steelworks

The site was home to the Brymbo Steelworks, where iron and steel was produced. It was set up by John Wilkinson, who already operated a furnace in nearby Bersham. Wilkinson had bought Brymbo Hall and built two blast furnaces on the site, with it first operating in 1796 for the production of iron, while steel production began later in 1884. The steelworks were closed in 1990, to the loss of more than 1,100 jobs at the time of the closure, with many buildings on the site becoming derelict. Following the closure, the site was taken over by Brymbo Developments Limited, leading to parts of the area becoming housing.

In 1958, Brymbo Man, a Bronze Age skeleton dating to 1600 BC, was discovered on the former steelworks site. In 2003, the Brymbo Fossil Forest was discovered during coal-mining, containing fossils dating to over 300 million years ago.

In September 2013, the Brymbo Heritage Group was awarded £97,000 in funding from the Heritage Lottery Fund, to support the group's efforts to develop a heritage centre on the site. The group plans to set up guided tours, gather oral history and memories of former workers, and conduct the digitisation of 3,000 old photos and other materials for use as learning materials to local schools, colleges and universities. The fund described the site as a "unique, a surviving example of an 18th Century ironworks". In November 2013, part of the old steelworks site was cleared to make it safer to organise heritage tours, as part of plans to turn it into a heritage centre. In 2013, the site had three scheduled monuments and a grade II* listed building, a former agent's house, on the site.

In 2015, the fossil forest was designated as a Site of Special Scientific Interest.

In April 2017, the Brymbo Heritage Group was awarded £2 million from the BIG Lottery Fund to create parkland around the site. The group planned to make the site more accessible to members of the public through the addition of footpaths and bridleways. The group had further plans for the area, including using nine old buildings located on the site for a development to include a heritage centre, business units, shops, apartments and learning facilities. Also in 2017, the Brymbo Heritage Trust was registered as a charity.

In October 2017, plans to regenerate the site were given £800,000 in funding to develop the project. Campaigners hoped they can secure £5 million from the National Lottery Heritage Fund to open a heritage centre. John Glen, UK heritage minister, expressed hopes that it can become a new exciting tourist and cultural attraction. The Brymbo Heritage Trust would use the awarded funding to develop its proposals, by developing its designs, engineering, costs and legal aspects, ahead of the application's second stage in late 2019, and if approved hoped for building to start in 2020.

In February 2020, councillors of Wrexham County Borough Council supported plans to develop the area into a heritage site, initially called "Stori Brymbo: A 300 Million Year Journey". The plans followed various other ideas raised to celebrate Brymbo's past. The councillors backed the Brymbo Heritage Trust's bid for £4 million of funding from the National Lottery. Council leader Mark Pritchard described the plans as a "fantastic opportunity" to mark Brymbo's 200-year-long industrial history.

The Brymbo Heritage Trust had previously secured £3 million from the National Lottery, to repair a machine shop dating from the 1920s and to create parkland. The heritage trust applied for a further £6.1 million in funding in November 2019 to fund its plans for a combined visitor, community, commercial and learning space. Under the plans, such attraction would include a visitor centre, business units and a shop. They would also utilise the spaces occupied by the old buildings and structures on the site, such as the 1920 machine shop, further develop the Brymbo Fossil Forest, through further excavations and conservation work, and work on other buildings in the area. The trust hoped £4.1 million in funding would be approved from the National Lottery Heritage Fund, with a loan from the council also an option for the trust if their lottery funding were granted. At the time, it was hoped to open by 2023. By 2024, it has received £10 million in funding, with it planned to open in 2026.

In 2024, the Welsh Government awarded the project a £300,000 grant, and by June 2024 two planning applications for the project had been approved, enabling work to begin on the project by July 2024. In September 2024, MPH Construction, Mold, was named as the main contractor. In February 2025, Creative Core was announced to lead the design of the attraction. By October 2025, the plans also include the development of a community parkland called the Lodge Valley Park. In January 2026, the site suffered a break-in. On 6 July 2026, the centre opened.

== Development ==
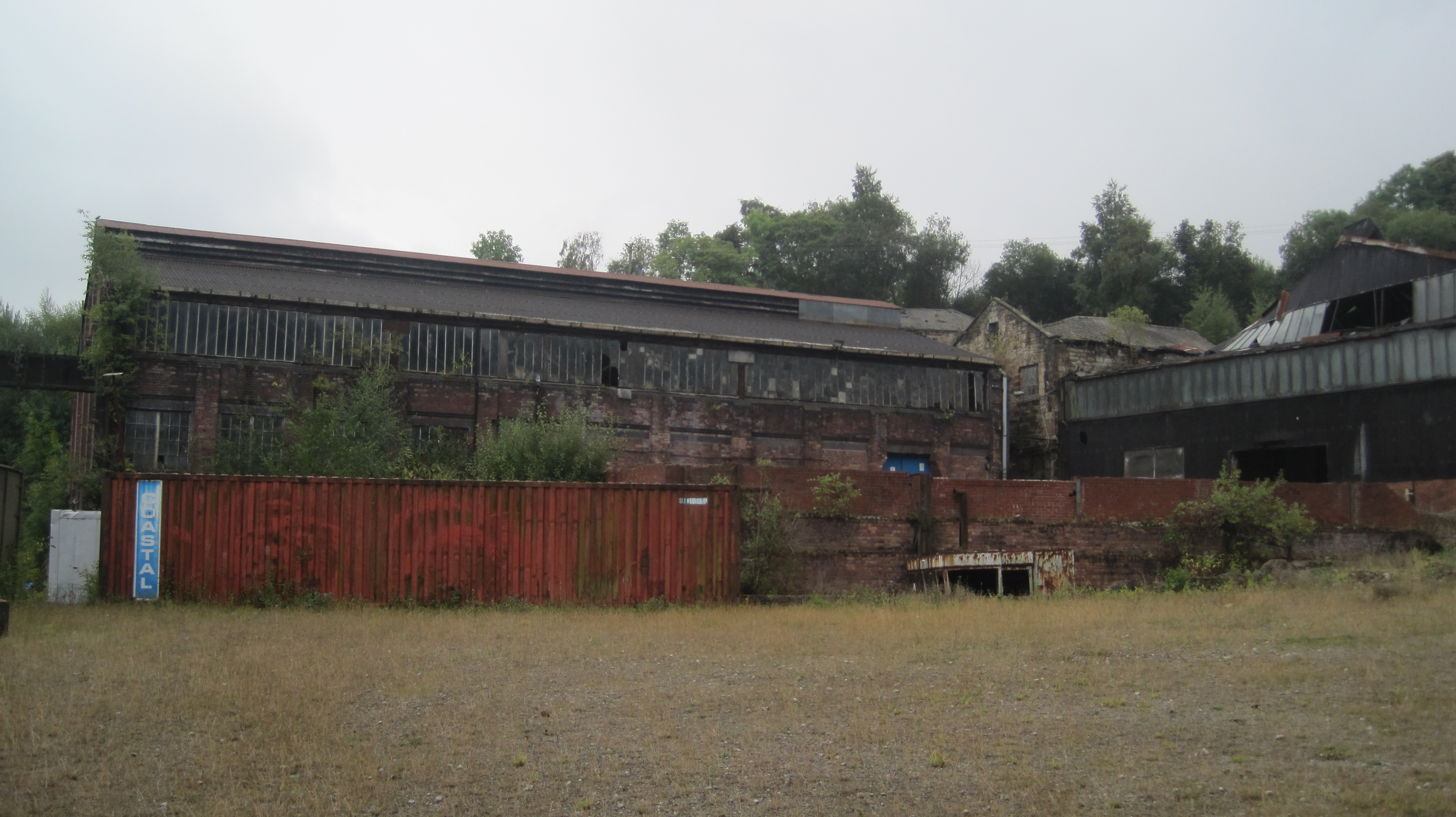
The Grade II* former agent's house on the old steelworks site

Stori Brymbo is part of a heritage restoration and community hub project to develop a visitor attraction, located on the former Brymbo Steelworks site in Brymbo, Wrexham. The heritage attraction would focus on the area's 200 year history of steel production, and the Brymbo Fossil Forest, a fossilised forest containing fossils dating back to 300 million years ago. £10 million of funding has been allocated to the project from the Heritage lottery and other sources. It is expected to open in June 2026.

The development would involve the conversion of the old buildings into a visitor centre, also containing a cafe, art and retail spaces, and an exhibition space that can host community and educational events. There would also be an area to allow visitors to watch excavation work of the fossil forest in real-time. There also additional plans for the refurbishment and re-use of a Grade II* former agent’s house, the refurbishment of a scheduled monument pattern makers' workshop as an additional visitor facility for permanent exhibitions, and redeveloping a 1920 machine shop as a centrepiece. Works around the heritage area would also commence, and a community parkland space called the "Lodge Valley Park" would also be created on the other side of Phoenix Drive.

The project's main contractor for the construction and redevelopment work would be Mold-based firm MPH Construction, beginning work in September 2024. The main Fossil Forest building was expected to be completed by January 2025, with the machine shop redevelopment also set to be completed first. While the pattern shop and agent's house are to follow afterwards. Creative Core would lead the design of the project, the team recently had work at the Peace Museum in West Yorkshire, England.

The project is funded by the National Lottery Heritage Fund, National Lottery Community Fund, and Cadw. It is also supported by Natural Resources Wales, Wrexham County Borough Council, and Brymbo Developments Limited.
