= Bersham Ironworks =

Former ironworks near Wrexham, Wales

Coordinates: 53°02′10″N 03°01′42″W

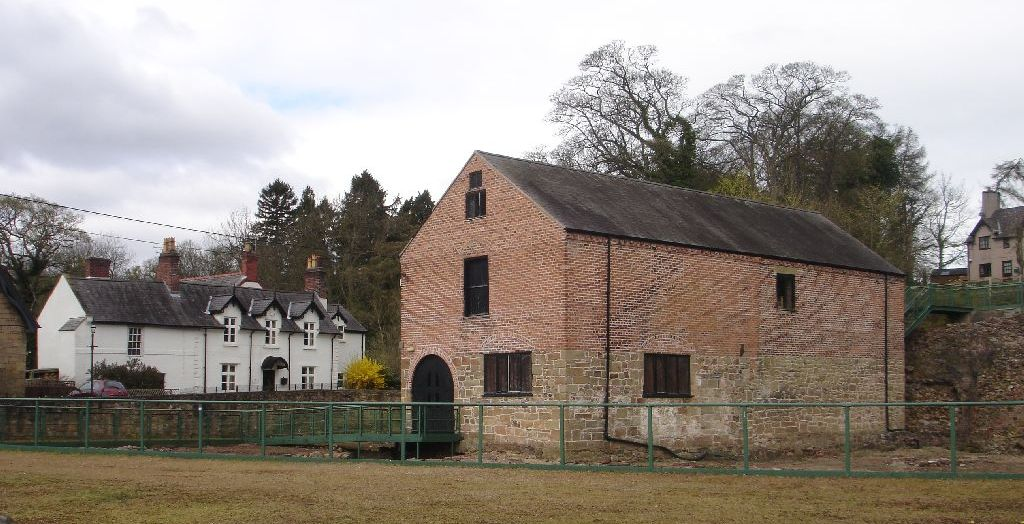
Bersham Ironworks standing today in the village of Bersham

Bersham Ironworks was a large ironworks at Bersham, near Wrexham, Wales. The original working site of John Wilkinson, it was the first site in the world to use a new way of boring holes in cannon and steam engine cylinders.

== History ==
=== Early years ===
The dates for the first furnace at Pentre Debenni in Bersham township, are unknown. The location has all the elements required nearby, charcoal, iron ore, limestone (for flux), water power to drive bellows, and natural cliffs as the furnace had to be charged from above and tapped at the bottom. The only shortcoming being the need to use land transport for products, there being no navigable river nearby. There is evidence that there was a furnace here in the 17th century. A 1934 newspaper article quotes an Esclusham parish report of the death of the wife of a charcoal burner in a cabin by the "ffurnesse" in 1699. This same article suggests the right to smelt iron dates back to 1611–1612, but does not cite a source. A 1974 newspaper article claims the furnace was initially created by Sir Richard Lloyd in 1670, again without citing a source for this information. According to local historian Alfred Neobard Palmer, it was originally known as the Pentre Works, but as its importance grew it took the name of the township rather than the village.

The furnace was rebuilt in 1717 by Charles Lloyd of Dolobran forge, and in 1721 it changed over from using charcoal to coke as fuel, an idea that Abraham Darby had made work in 1709 at Coalbrookdale and used for casting cooking pots. The coal came from the pits at Rhosllanerchrugog owned by Thomas Meredith of Pentre Bychan. Use of coke in the production of iron for forging had been less successful as the sulphur from the coal tended to cause problems when hot working the iron (see hot-shortness). Abraham Darby died in 1717, and his son, Abraham, was only six at the time so this conversion to coke in 1721 wasn't directly due to Darby; however, Lloyd and Darby were both Quakers and reputed to be friends. Lloyd's business at Bersham went bankrupt in 1729, and the ironworks was then taken over by John Hawkins, who had married Darby's daughter Ann. In 1733 there was an investment of funds into Bersham from Coalbrookdale, evidence of the ties between the businesses. According to one source the lease of the Bersham Furnace was taken up in 1733 by Richard Ford and Thomas Goldney, who also had the lease of the Old Willey furnace at Broseley and converted it to coke fuelling at the same time. Goldney had a 50% share in Coalbrookdale and was key in ensuring the business continued following Darby's death in 1717.

=== Isaac Wilkinson ===
In 1753, Isaac Wilkinson, John Wilkinson, and Edward Blakeway, as partners took over the lease of the ironworks. Isaac was keen to experiment and had just got a patent for making metallic rollers for processing grain and sugar cane. While at Bersham he patented several inventions, including a method for blowing a furnace using iron bellows powered by waterwheel or fire engine (now known as Newcomen engine), and an improved method for casting cannons, rollers. etc. With the outbreak of the Seven Years' War in 1756 there was increasing demand for cannons. Although he had his own patented casting technique, like all other manufacturers of cannons the bore was formed using a casting core, and then after removal of the core, the bore had to be finish machined to be straight and correct size. Errors could lead to cannonballs becoming stuck in the barrel, leading to explosions. In spite of his inventions Isaac Wilkinson ran into financial problems in 1761, which according to John Aiken (writing in 1795) was in part due to "an expensive scheme to convey a blast by bellows from a considerable distance, to the works, by the means of tubes underground".

=== John Wilkinson ===
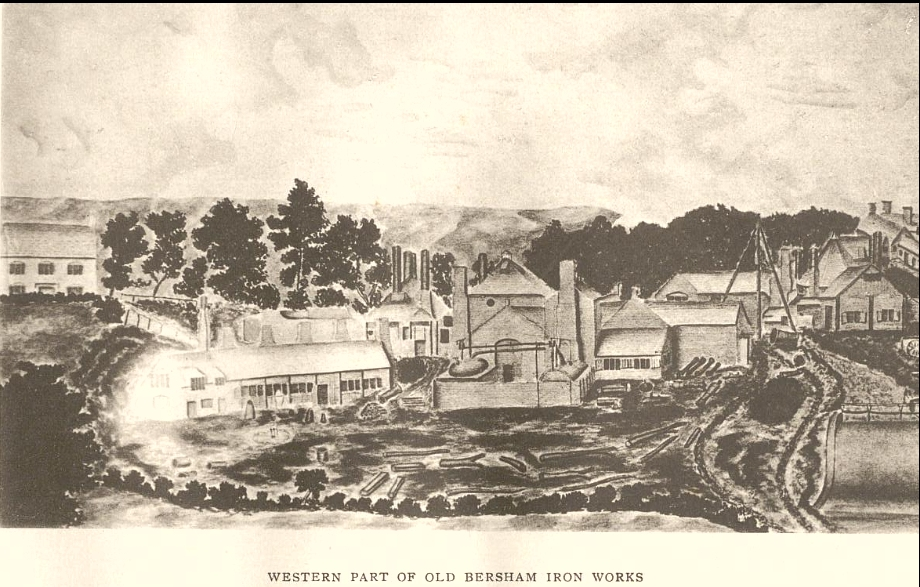
A sketch made in 1780 of the Western Part of the Bersham Ironworks

Isaac's son John Wilkinson took over Bersham Ironworks in 1762, together with his brother, William. John had lost his first wife, Ann, following the birth of their first child, and in 1763 he married Mary Lee, the wealthy sister of Edward Blakeway's wife. This allowed him to enter a partnership to lease the old blast furnace at Willey, near Broseley in Shropshire. The furnace had been out of use for 3 years, but was restarted and a new furnace built – so John had plenty more than Bersham to occupy him. However it was at Bersham that in 1774 John devised a method to accurately make a smooth bore cannon, involving casting without a core and then drilling successively larger sizes until a boring tool could be used – the cannon being rotated rather than the tool. He patented this in 1774, and in 1778 was actively threatening to prosecute anyone boring guns or cannon from solid. In tests by the Board of Ordnance, his cannons were so superior that in 1779 they revoked his patent on the basis of the national need. Cannons produced using the Wilkinson technique were used in the American War of Independence and the Napoleonic Wars. John Wilkinson also devised a method for boring large cylinders for steam engines (early steam engine cylinders were up to 100 inches (2,500 mm)). When James Watt built his first steam engine with separate condenser in 1770 he found that he needed a much more precise cylinder to piston fit than the Newcomen engines. For four years he was unable to find anyone capable of producing cylinders to the required dimensional tolerances, but in 1774 John Wilkinson demonstrated a method using a stationary cylinder casting and a rotating boring bar supported at both ends. This achieved the desired precision and as a result the way was now clear for the Watt engine to go into production. Boulton & Watt was formed in 1775, and John Wilkinson was given the exclusive contract to provide the cylinders. This arrangement continued for many years, though was later soured when it was discovered that Wilkinson had been marketing his own black market steam engines on the side.

One of the first Boulton and Watt engines was installed at John Wilkinson's New Willey ironworks in Broseley, Staffordshire in 1776, another was installed at Bloomfield Colliery where it was noted that all the "iron foundry parts (which are unparalleled for truth) were executed by Mr Wilkinson".

The production of cannon and steam engine cylinders provided John Wilksinon with a handsome return which he invested in other iron works, as well as lead, copper and other interests. However Bersham remained a key iron works, and was described by John Aiken in 1795:

"Besides the smelting furnaces, there are now several air furnaces for re-melting the pig iron, and casting it into various articles; such as cylinders for fire engines, water-pipes, boilers, pots and pans of all sizes, box and flat irons, and cannon and ball of all dimensions. The cannon are now cast solid, and bored like a wooden pipe, according to a very capital modern improvement. The small stream here turns machinery for the boring of cannon, the grinding flat and box irons, &c. There are also forges for malleable iron, and wire works; and likewise a newly erected brass foundry."..."At a short distance lead ore is got in considerable quantities and is smelted upon the spot; and Messr Wilkinsons have a work for the casting of lead pipes of various sizes and drawing them out to any lengths."

Aiken also commented on the transport issues associated with the works:

"A number of waggons are constantly employed in carrying goods between Bersham Furnace and Chester, which being 14 mi (23 km) land carriage is attended with great expense. But this inconvenience will be attended by the Ellesmere Canal, which is to pass by these works, and a cut from it, called the Brymbo branch, will go to a new and large iron foundry now erecting by Mr John Wilkinson".

The extension of the Ellesmere Canal northwards from Trevor never took place.

John Wilkinson's partner, his younger brother William, had spent several years in France where, among other things, he set up an ironworks at Le Creusot Montcenis. When he returned in 1789, his relationship with his brother deteriorated and got even worse when John bought the Brymbo Hall Estate in 1792 with plans for a new ironworks next to the mines providing raw materials. This area had previously been unsuitable due to insufficient water power, but the advent of steam engines to drive the machinery and blowers meant the location had significant advantages over Bersham. William was not invited to participate in the creation of what later became Brymbo Steelworks. William felt he had not had the returns expected from his partnership, and when John Wilkinson refused to show him the account with Boulton & Watt, he approached Boulton & Watt directly. Things degenerated rapidly and in April 1795 John Wilkinson wrote to Boulton & Watt saying the works were closed by injunction and so existing contracts for cylinders could not be executed. On the advice of arbitrators brought in to resolve the dispute between John and William, the Bersham Ironworks was put up for auction in November 1795:

"That old established Iron work called BERSHAM FURNACE. Comprising the Machinery and Utensils thereto belonging, together with the Revertion of the sundry leases of the Lands and Buildings; the whole being well calculated for carrying on the Foundry Business on an extensive scale".

In 1795 William advised Boulton & Watt that his brother had been selling steam engines and using them on his own mines without their knowledge, and in September 1795 William took James Watt junior on a tour to Brymbo and Minera to see the evidence. The infringements amounted to 19 engines for his own use plus 2 more being erected at Brymbo, and 8 engines sold to customers. How many were cast and machined at Bersham is not known, 10 of these were at Bradley ironworks, the others mostly at John Wilkinson's lead mines in Minera and Llyn-y-Pandy (near Mold). John Wilkinson had to pay a substantial fee for his infringements. William sought the support of Boulton and Watt to purchase the Bersham ironworks, but it was John Wilkinson that was the highest bidder, and so became sole owner.

William Wilkinson is said to have advised on the design of Boulton and Watt's Soho Foundry in Birmingham which opened in 1795. William's daughter Mary Anne married Matthew Boulton's son, Matthew Robinson Boulton, in 1817.

=== After the Wilkinsons ===
Bersham iron works continued in use well into the 19th century, but its best days were behind it. In 1801 it advertised steam engines made on the patent principle, and lead pipes manufactured under royal licence, these being advertised by Thomas Glover and Son of Leeds. In 1802 it made the news by casting a copper table weighing 20 tons (to be used for making plate glass), the copper being melted in five furnaces, each holding 4 tons. In 1805 the making of a 22-ton copper table was also reported, the surface being levelled by a large cast iron plane driven by a water wheel.

The works again came up for auction in June 1813, and listed foundries, furnaces, boring mills, rolling mills, forges, machinery for casting and drawing patent lead pipes, cannon foundry and machinery for boring and turning cannon, smith's shops, carpenters shops, pattern-makers shops, dwelling houses for workmen and agents..."in excellent repair". Two powerful falls of water, 70 acres (28 ha) of land in cultivation, excluding nearly 20 acres (8.1 ha) forming the work sites. The works was described as formerly in the occupation of Mr Wilkinson, and since then in the occupation of Mr Thomas Jones (the only son of William Jones of Llanerchrugog Hall). Notice of the sale began early in 1812. Thomas Jones also ran the Ponkey ironworks and colliery, which he put up for sale in 1812. His new Llwyneinion ironworks were starting up about this time so he may have decided to focus his work and finances on the new business.

Conspicuous in these sale details is the absence of any mention of a steam engine or boiler house at Bersham, though it is believed that the works had a steam pumping engine installed in the late 1750s or early 1760s to raise water from below the waterwheel to above it in times of low water supply. This would be the Newcomen or 'atmospheric' type engine, which were very inefficient. This suggests the works remained primarily powered by the river even though it had been the place where the breakthrough had taken place which allowed Boulton & Watt steam engine production that revolutionised industry.

After the sale in 1813, there was limited use of the site. The waterwheel and a couple of buildings in the East works were leased for 45 years in 1818 by William and Joseph Harris, who used it as a paper mill, the upper of 3 paper mills they had on the river. This business ran into trouble in 1849 and the three mills were put up for auction - the top mill being sold together with 8 cottages. The paper mill operated under different owners for several years the last being the Bersham Paper Company, from 1863 to 1866, and it was demolished in 1869, with the site being used to build the Bersham National Boys School in 1876. According to the historian, A.N. Palmer, there was an association with Messr Ayton (or Aydon) and Alwall and then with Messrs Poole and Company in 1819 - and in June 1819 the papers reported the dissolution of a partnertship between Peter Poole and Edward Hollingworth, iron founders of Bersham. After this part was let to the smithy Edward Mullard and the rest fell into decay.

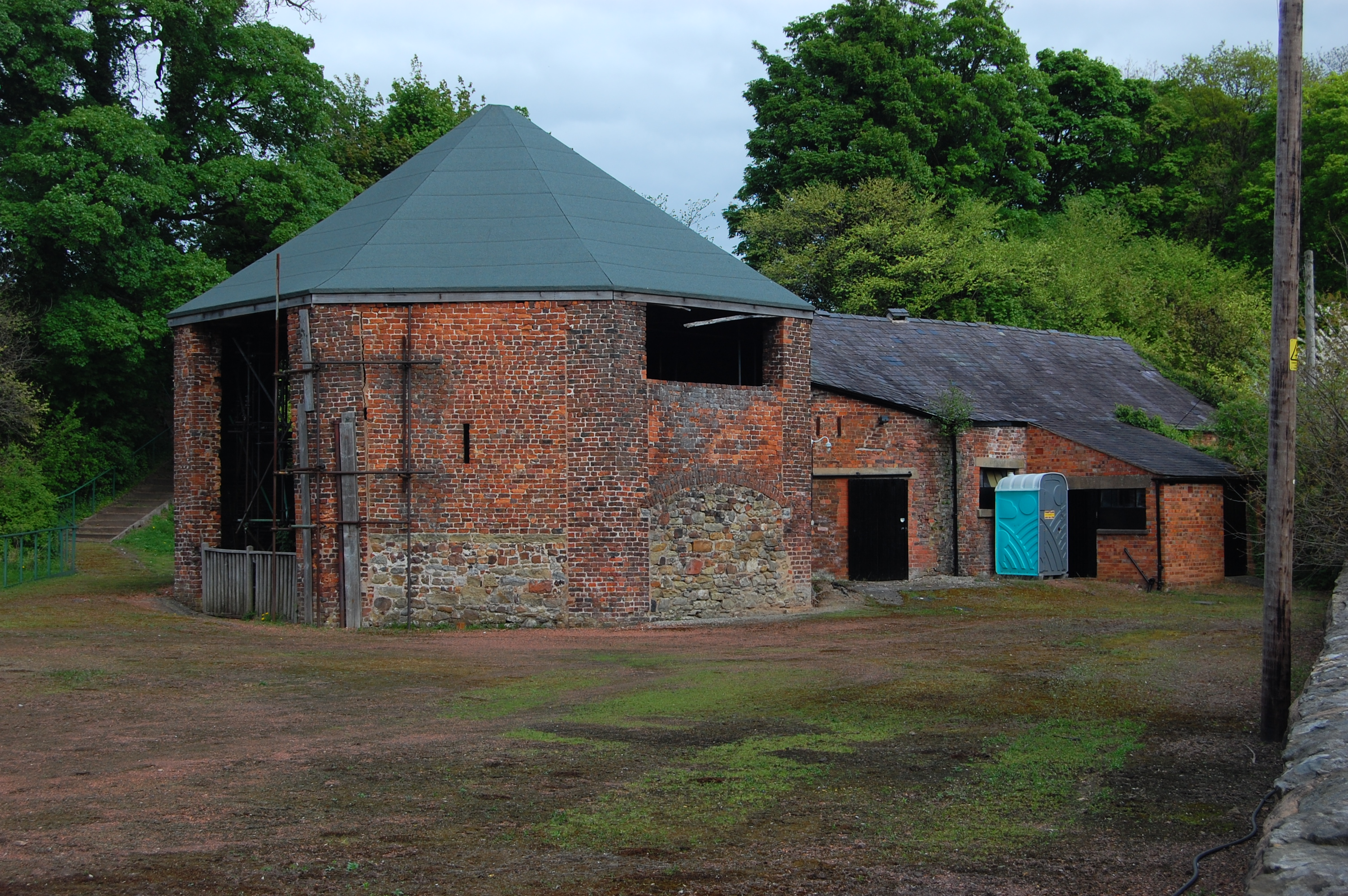
The octagonal building is where the casting of cannon took place, as well as the iron production for them

== Excavation and debate ==
Between 1987 and 1991, extensive excavations were carried out on the site, and revealed all the foundations of the original buildings and the rear wall of the engine house. They also revealed a lime kiln, with lime on the walls. Another excavation showed it was a blast furnace, as pig iron was found around it. This opened debate to what it actually was, and the debate is taught in local schools.

Another find during the excavations was part of a wooden railway. These wooden waggonways are known from other industrial sites (notably New Willey furnace and Coalbrookdale at about the same dates), but the earliest in Britain dates back to around 1600 (e.g. Wollaton Wagonway). Forty metres of track comprising oak sleepers and rails made of ash were recovered from the site including a set of points. The piece of track, carbonised, still rests at the museum inside the mill building.

The waggonways appear to have extended beyond the works. When Isaac Wilkinson contracted (for 40 years) to use coal and ironstone from Llwyn Enion on Mr John Hughes' Cae Gas Estate in June 1757 the contract included the right of "laying rails or making a railroad to the pits from the main or great road". This same contract also included a right to create a railroad over Mr Hughes land to take coal from the Ponkey colliery towards Bersham. There is a record in the National Library of Wales (F4495) of Isaac Wilkinson and partners leasing land in 1758 "called the Garden, Cadwgan fechan, Cae'r Saison, Cae Mawr, Park, Werglodd y Llong and Llwyn onn for the purpose of constructing a railroad to carry coal to Bersham furnace", these fields being identifiable from the tithe map as laying West of the Bersham ironworks towards the Cae Glas estate. In 1759 there was another lease of land (F1397) called "Cae Ravon, Erw Harry and Erw Vawr in the parish of Rhuabon for constructing a railroad." In addition to the 40-year lease for all the coal and iron ore at Llwyn Enion, in 1758 Isaac took a 99-year lease on the coal and iron ore at Bryn'r Owen, so the 1759 lease may relate to that. However, given the business ran into financial difficulties around 1761, it is possible that the railroads were not all completed, though a newspaper article in 1974 discussing subsidence due to old unrecorded coal mines in Ponciau (aka Ponkey), states that the Ponciau mines were linked to the Bersham ironworks by a 2 mi (3 km) tramway. The sketch of the Western Works made in 1780 appears to show tracks entering the works, suggesting that Isaac's railroads were continued in use by John Wilkinson.

An issue on which reports seem to differ, is that when relationships between John and William broke down, it was reported that William sent a gang of men to destroy the ironworks, and that John responded by sending his own gang of men to continue the destruction. Why William would attack the works in which he had a partnership, rather than another of John's holding is unclear. The extent of the damage must have been limited as the Bersham works continued in use for many years. Perhaps there was a specific project within Bersham that John had planned to transfer to Brymbo, and that was targeted. Alternatively, maybe this was a way to expedite the break up of the partnership without legal expenses.

== Restoration and preservation ==
After the historical importance of Bersham was recognised, Wrexham Council put the site forward for preservation as the Bersham Heritage Centre. The nearby Bersham School was reopened as an extensive museum dedicated to local history and Bersham Ironworks, and holds the remaining smooth bore cutting piece from the machine. The Mill building was restored and opened as a secondary museum, and contains artefacts such as the wooden waggonway and several pieces from the excavations, with a guided tour of them all. Most recently, the building that made the cannon's smooth bores was given a new roof and internal scaffolding to reinforce the structure. Now the site is earmarked for more funding by the Welsh Government.
