= Brymbo Fossil Forest =

Protected area in Clwyd, Wales

- Coedwig Ffosil Brymbo (Welsh)
- Interactive map of Brymbo Fossil Forest
- 53.07382°N 3.05318°W
- Type: Palaeobotanical site
- Location: Brymbo, Wrexham County Borough, Wales
- Nearest city: Wrexham

History
- Discovery: 2003

Site notes
- Current use: Part of Stori Brymbo heritage centre
- Owner: Brymbo Heritage Trust
- Website: www.brymboheritagetrust.org/brymbo-fossil-forest
- Coedwig Ffosil; Brymbo; Fossil Forest
- Site of Special Scientific Interest
- Location within Wrexham
- Area of search: Clwyd
- Grid reference: SJ 2958 5345
- Coordinates: 53.07382°N 3.05318°W
- Interest: Geological
- Area: 0.52 hectares (56,000 sq ft)
- Notification date: 14 July 2015

The Brymbo Fossil Forest is a palaeobotanical site near Brymbo, Wrexham County Borough, Wales. It is known as a significant area of upper Carboniferous fossils, and is a Site of Special Scientific Interest. The site is being developed to be part of the Stori Brymbo project.

== Description ==
It is located on the former iron and steelworks site closed in 1990, it is roughly the size of half an association football pitch, and is home to a wide variety of fossilised plants and trees such as arborescent club mosses and horsetails, dating over 300 million years ago, from the upper Carboniferous period.

Some fossils were transferred and conserved at National Museum Wales, with them set to return should a suitable venue be ready. Discovered during coal-mining in 2003, with many fossils discovered the following year, it was designated as a Site of Special Scientific Interest by Natural Resources Wales in 2015. Local councillors describe the site to be a potential World Heritage Site, with hopes to become the county borough's second site of such designation. A tourist attraction including a museum and visitor centre, to provide a safe home for the fossils, is proposed on the site, using the old former steelwork buildings.

Upon the forest's discovery, six tree-sized plants were found in a small area, with later work revealing more than 20 specimens, although the forest containing a "large number" of two types of tree-sized plants, the Calamites and Lepidodendron.

The site is being developed as part of the wider Stori Brymbo project.

== Natural history ==
The coal seams of the area were deposited as plant debris thick mats approximately 300 million years ago during the Carboniferous. During this time, modern-day North Wales, would have been situated around the equator, therefore any prehistoric forest would have been hot and humid, housing tropical animals. The forest at this time contained no flowering plants, with connections between prehistoric and living flora on the same site proving difficult. In between the layers of coal at the site are mudstone and sandstone layers, which represent flash flooding events which would have buried much of the river delta, located in the area, with sediment.

== See also ==
- List of Sites of Special Scientific Interest in Clwyd
- List of Sites of Special Scientific Interest in Wrexham
