= Llwyneinion =

Village in Wales

Coordinates: 53.02044°N 3.06824°W

- Location within Wrexham
- OS grid reference: SJ28444755
- Community: Esclusham
- Principal area: Wrexham
- Preserved county: Clwyd
- Country: Wales
- Sovereign state: United Kingdom
- Post town: WREXHAM
- Postcode district: LL14
- Dialling code: 01978
- Police: North Wales
- Fire: North Wales
- Ambulance: Welsh
- UK Parliament: Clwyd South
- Senedd Cymru – Welsh Parliament: Clwyd South

Llwyneinion (Welsh pronunciation: [ɬʊɨˈnɛinjɔn]) is a hamlet in Wrexham County Borough, Wales. It is part of the community of Esclusham. Its name can be translated from the Welsh language as "Einion's Grove", although until at least the 19th century the name was more commonly written as Llwynenion, "Enion's Grove".

Llwyneinion has appeared in records since at least the 17th century and was once one of the properties owned by Elihu Yale, having been bought by his father.

In 2011 Llwyneinion won a Silver Gilt award in the small villages category of the Wales in Bloom awards.

Llwyneinion Woods is now a registered village green and forms part of Wrexham Council's Open Spaces.

== Industrial History ==
Llwyneinion has near surface seams of coal, ironstone, and fire clay, and as a result there is a long industrial heritage in the area. Several pits were opened in the 1750s by Isaac Wilkinson, who used the iron ore and coal at his nearby works at Bersham where there was water power to drive the blast furnace bellows. The advent of steam power to operate the bellows for blast furnaces allowed them to be located close to where the iron ore and coal was mined, resulting in the new iron works at Llwyneinion (and at Brymbo). The Llwyneinion furnaces were constructed by partners William Jones, William Rigby (of Hawarden), and Thomas Jones after they leased the land in 1811. The coal and iron ore was locally available and the limestone (flux) came from Trevor and Fron. Thomas Jones (the only son of William Jones of Llanerchrugog Hall) had earlier bought the lease to the Bersham ironworks after John Wilkinson ceased operations there, and had also owned the ironworks and colliery in Ponkey, but in 1812-1813 he sold both of these and concentrated on his new ironworks in Llwyneinion.

The Jones, Rigby and Jones partnership (of "Llwynennion and Aberderwin" - probably Aberderfyn) was dissolved in April 1825, and the site freehold went for sale at the same time. From the sale particulars we know that the site lease started in 1811, and in 1825 there was a single blast furnace producing 40 tons per week of pig iron and the site included a steam engine, housing for workmen, and 'railways'. Iron production continued here until 1829 when the Thomas Jones became bankrupt, the sale included the blast engine with 3 boilers, "60 rail-road waggons", "five miles of rail-road", and ten thousand firebricks, a second sale the following day included a winding engine with boiler, winding barrel, pumps, pit-heads, and "several miles of rail-road". It seems not all was sold and there was a further sale in 1832, which included "blast, winding and pumping engines" and "130 ton of iron rail-road".

From a sale of the freehold of the "Llwyn Ennion Estate" in 1840 we know that the iron works still existed as it was subject to a 30 year lease by the Llwyn Ennion Iron Company from 1837, however this company appears to have gone bankrupt in 1841. A sale of the lease of the "Rhos Hall, or Llanerchrugog and Llwynenion Estates" resulting from the liquidation of the Rhos Hall Iron Company in 1869 refers to the Llwynenion branch of the Shropshire Union Railway which passes within a few yards of the blast furnaces. However these appear to be the "new furnaces" erected by Messrs Cresswell and Co, in a venture that failed due to a dispute about royalties, and never used. This appears to mark the end of iron making projects, and it is possible that iron making never resumed after 1829, however brickmaking and the colliery continued. The coal pit closed in the mid 1880s, but coal was rediscovered at Llwynenion when the railway from Wrexham was being built in 1900, with a coal seam being unearthed just 46 feet below the surface when a cutting was being created for the railway.

The Llwyneinion Pipe, Tile and Fireclay Co operated from the 1850s and closed c1880. One of the main products was sewerage pipes which were made from 1854. Powell Bros, Isaac and William, had a sizeable brickworks opened in 1891, and in 1924 became the Llwyneinion Shale Brick Co. It became the property of the Hartleys in 1927, who also owned the Ruby brickworks in Mold and the Hoole Bank, Chester brickworks, finally closing in 1957.

Despite this industrial past, the immediate area is now largely rural in character.

== Llwyneinion Acid Tar Lagoon ==
In 1964 the Llywneinion Shale Brick Company got planning permission for the use of the disused pit as a waste dump. The site was used until 1972 for dumping of highly toxic industrial waste, mostly from the Burmah-Castrol company at Ellesmere Port, comprising around 94000 tons of sulphuric acid mixed with tar-like hydrocarbons, 7500 tons of spent bentonite containing absorbed heavy oil, and over 1000 metal drums with unknown contents, comprising one of the largest instances of such dumping in the UK. The waste was tipped into the unlined quarry, creating a 1.3 hectare lagoon containing a layer of 75 mm of volatile hydrocarbon floating on 0.5 m of water, itself overlaying perhaps 10 m of tar waste and three possibly uncapped mine shafts. The site, along with an adjacent tip used for dumping of chemical waste from the Monsanto works in Cefn Mawr, was purchased in 1980 from the landowners for £1 by the then local authority Clwyd County Council, as the latter was concerned about environmental contamination. In August 1980 the lagoon site caught fire, resulting in the temporary evacuation of nearby Rhosllanerchrugog.

The lagoon site, which is now surrounded by woodland, is yet to be cleared and is still considered the most problematic and hazardous waste site in North Wales. In 2007 the Environment Agency Wales ruled that the site did not represent a significant risk to human health as access was restricted and the majority of volatiles had burnt off. A variety of plans have been put forward for decontamination, though none have yet been implemented due to the high estimated cost of the remediation work.

== See also ==
- Brofiscin Quarry
