= Isaac Wilkinson =

English industrialist (1695–1784)

Isaac Wilkinson (baptised 6 May 1695 - 31 January 1784) was an English industrialist, one of the founders of the iron industry and pioneer of the Industrial Revolution. However, his business ethics were precarious and his commercial affairs frequently chaotic. He became much addicted to litigation.

== Early life ==
Wilkinson was born in Washington, then in County Durham. He was the fifth child of John Wilkinson and his wife, Margaret Thompson. His mother died soon after his birth and his father in 1704, leaving him to be brought up by his elder brother John, a wool merchant. He seems to have received some basic education before being apprenticed a foundryman, probably at the nearby Swalwell works. There, he established himself as a highly skilled iron-worker, able to demand high wages.

== Cumberland and Lancashire ==
Some time between 1721 and 1723, Wilkinson moved to Workington where he worked at the Little Clifton furnace which probably produced cast iron by smelting with coke. Here Wilkinson operated as a specialist subcontractor to the furnace. In 1735 he moved to Backbarrow furnace, which smelted with charcoal, buying iron from the firm and selling his own produce. He was an influence on John Wilkinson his son.

In 1738 he patented a cast box smoothing-iron though it is suspected that he already knew that it was invalid owing to prior art. He went into production in partnership with his brother John but indulged in "creative accounting" to cheat his brother of the profits and the partnership folded. By now, Isaac was living in Cartmel, enjoying several business interests, including the Lowwood iron company. However, the Lowwood project ended in litigation when the weakness of his patent emerged and he accused the enterprise of poaching workers from his other enterprises.

== Wales ==
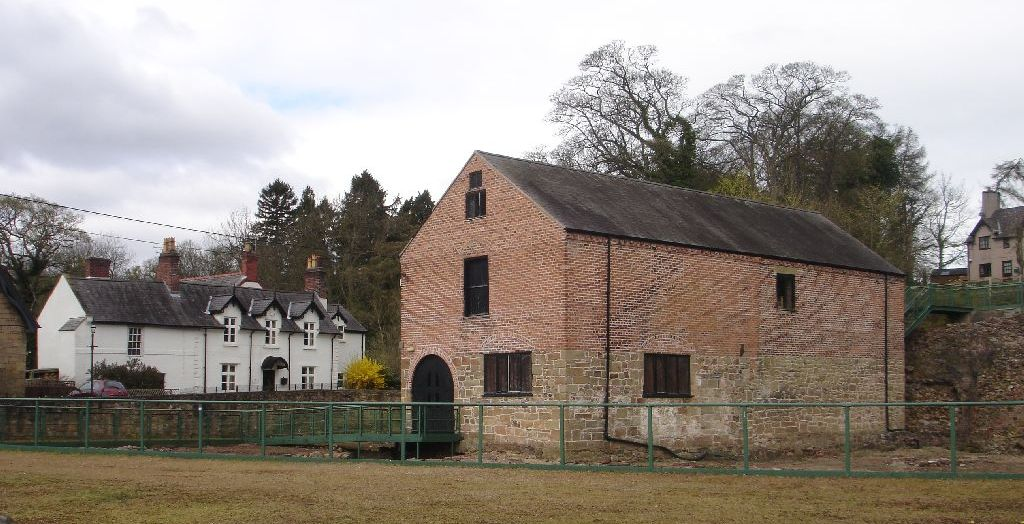
Bersham Ironworks

In 1753, Wilkinson moved south to Bersham, near Wrexham in Wales where me purchased Plas Grono, a house previously owned by Elihu Yale. At the Bersham Ironworks he operated a coke-fired blast furnace, with his son John, Edward Blakeway and others. Unlike Coalbrookdale, which was owned by quakers, Isaac was prepared to manufacture cannons. Wilkinson developed the business while maintaining his own subcontracted casting business. Another patent in 1757 was for a blowing-engine for blast furnaces, using columns of water similar to the trempe system, though it is uncertain how effective it was. Isaac patented a novel moulding process in 1758. Blakeway was declared bankrupt in 1759, his shares passing to Mary Lee who married John Wilkinson in 1763. This gave the Wilkinsons control of Bersham and the business flourished. Isaac's personal subcontract business was a source of continued tensions. Litigation against his partners, including his son, had started as early as 1762, being exacerbated by the slump in Bersham's business following the end of the Seven Years' War in 1763 when demand for armaments dried up. Isaac moved to Bristol and John ended up as the owner of the Bersham works.

== Later life ==
Isaac became a foundryman in Bristol with involvement in the south Wales Dowlais Ironworks and Cyfarthfa Ironworks, and starting the Plymouth Ironworks with John Guest. Disputes with coal suppliers at Cyfarthfa led to further legal action but Isaac's finances were becoming precarious. From the 1770s he was involved in further litigation, including, again, against his son John. He died in London, and was buried at St Giles in the fields, Holborn, on 8 Feb 1784.

== Private life ==
Wilkinson was Presbyterian in religion. In 1727 he married Mary Johnson (died 1786) and they had seven children including:

- John Wilkinson (1728–1808);
- Mary Wilkinson (1743–1796) who married Joseph Priestley; and
- William Wilkinson (1744–1808).

== Bibliography ==
- Chaloner, W. H. (1960) "Isaac Wilkinson, potfounder", in L. S. Presnell (ed.) Studies in the Industrial Revolution Presented to T. S. Ashton, London: Athlone Press
- — (1963) "John Wilkinson, ironmaster (1728–1808)", in W. H. Chaloner, People and Industries, London: Frank Cass Publishers, ISBN 0-7146-1284-7
- Davies, A. S. (1949–51). "Isaac Wilkinson (c.1705–1784) of Bersham, ironmaster and inventor". Transactions of the Newcomen Society. 27: 69–72. doi:10.1179/tns.1949.007.
- Harris, J. R. "Wilkinson, Isaac (bap. 1695, d. 1784)". Oxford Dictionary of National Biography (online ed.). Oxford University Press. doi:10.1093/ref:odnb/47483. (Subscription, Wikipedia Library access or UK public library membership required.)
