= Brymbo =

Village in Wales

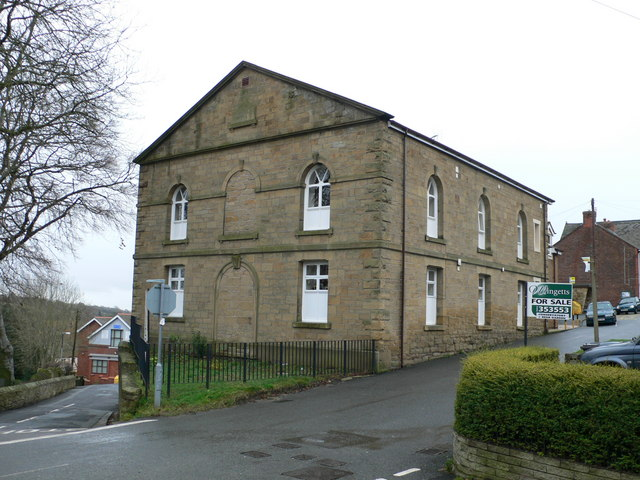
- Former Baptist chapel in Brymbo

- Location within Wrexham
- Population: 4,836 (2011)
- OS grid reference: SJ297537
- Community: Brymbo
- Principal area: Wrexham
- Preserved county: Clwyd
- Country: Wales
- Sovereign state: United Kingdom
- Post town: WREXHAM
- Postcode district: LL11
- Dialling code: 01978
- Police: North Wales
- Fire: North Wales
- Ambulance: Welsh
- UK Parliament: Wrexham
- Senedd Cymru – Welsh Parliament: Clwyd South
- List of places UK Wales Wrexham 53.076°N 3.050°W Map of the community

Brymbo is a village and community in Wrexham County Borough, Wales. It lies in the hilly country to the west of Wrexham city, largely surrounded by farmland.

At the 2001 Census, the population of the community area (including Brymbo village, along with the villages of Tanyfron and Bwlchgwyn and a number of rural hamlets) was 3,482, increasing to 4,836 at the 2011 Census. Brymbo is also the name of an electoral ward of Wrexham County Borough, whose population (including Brymbo and Tanyfron only) was 2,653 at the 2001 census, increasing to 3,981 at the 2011 Census.

The area was formerly heavily dependent on coal mining and steelmaking, and the Brymbo Steelworks, which operated between 1794 and 1990, was a prominent feature of the village and much of the surrounding area. The area had a strong community spirit and at least three major railways (GWR, LNWR, LNER) were present.

== History ==
Brymbo, possibly from the Welsh Bryn baw ("mud hill" or "dirt hill") first appears in records in 1339, although the area had clearly been occupied for centuries beforehand (see "Brymbo Man" below). At this stage Brymbo was a township covering a considerable area and containing a number of scattered settlements, farms, commons, and "wastes", or uncultivated areas. In 1410, the burgesses of the local settlement of Holt were granted the right to dig for coal in the wastes of "Harwd" and Coedpoeth; "Harwd", another early name for Brymbo, came from the English name "Harwood" ("Hare Wood") and referred to a common in one part of the township.

Sometime in the fifteenth century, landowner Edward ap Morgan ap Madoc, gentleman, built a dwelling in the township that was later to become Brymbo Hall, the home of his descendants the Griffith family.

A survey of the Lordship of Bromfield and Yale, conducted in 1620 by John Norden and his son, described the boundaries of the township of Brymbo, in the manor of Esclusham, as follows:

To the ffirst article the said Jurie doe say that the towneshipp of Brymbo, beeing part of ye said mannor, is bounded from Mynera by a brooke called Gwenfro, by a common there called Y Koed boeth by the south side; and from Flintshire by a brooke called Avon y Frith, running from a common called Nant y Frith to a river called Kegidog; and soe the said Kegidog running downeward a little beyond a bridge called Pont y Place Mayne vppon ye north side, and from Gwersilt by a little brooke called y Frwe, and from Broughton by a little brook running from a common called Harwood to a place called y Groes faen on ye east side; and vpon ye west, from ye said common called Nant y Frith to a place vpon ye said common called Maes Maylo' or thereabouts; but ye certaine boundes of ye said towneshipp vppon ye said mountayne or common, they cannott sett downe.

The older parts of Brymbo Steelworks in the 1970s, showing its restricted hillside site, with the melting shop (centre) and blast furnace (top) next to the village (top right). The banks shown in the foreground had covered most of the former village of Lodge.

While there was mining of coal in the area on a small scale, the late eighteenth century saw an expansion in activity, particularly after the industrialist John "Iron-Mad" Wilkinson purchased Brymbo Hall and began developing its estate, mining coal and ironstone and building an ironworks which was later to become the Brymbo Steelworks. By 1821 there was a total of 41 coal pits on the Brymbo Hall estate alone. In the nineteenth century, a number of larger deep mines were sunk around the area, and the majority of the village of Brymbo was developed as accommodation for the miners and ironworkers. The village itself was constructed on and around the steep sides of Brymbo Hill with views towards the Cheshire Plain, though the area's topography was later to cause problems when the steelworks expanded in 1956: the new parts had to be built on a vast artificial plateau of slag from the furnaces, filling the width of the valley and burying most of the village of Lodge, whose houses were purchased and demolished.

Although the steelworks continued in production, many of the area's collieries ran into geological and financial problems by the time of the Great Depression, and the area's last deep mine (the Plas Power pit, near Southsea) closed in 1938, though the Smelt drift mine, west of the village, closed in 1967 (many of the remaining coal deposits were extracted by open-cast mining immediately west of the steelworks during 1972–75). The steelworks itself, after several years of uncertainty, was finally to close in stages between 1990 and 1991, having a severe economic impact on the village.

== Administrative history ==
In 1844, the old township of Brymbo, previously part of the ecclesiastical parish of Wrexham, became the new ecclesiastical parish of Brymbo. The corresponding civil parish of Brymbo, also based on the old township boundaries, was (as a result of the Local Government Act 1972) replaced in 1974 by the Community of Brymbo, which includes the village itself, the smaller neighbouring village of Tanyfron, and Bwlchgwyn, in addition to the small settlements of Vron or Fron, Pen-Rhos, Four Crosses, Maes Maelor, Glascoed, and Ffrwd: these boundaries are still very similar to the township boundaries given in Norden's 1620 survey. The Community is divided into three electoral wards, Brymbo, Bwlchgwyn and Vron and is governed by Brymbo Community Council (Welsh: Cyngor Cymuned Brymbo).

Brymbo was within the county of Denbighshire until 1974, and the new county of Clwyd until 1996, when the latter was abolished. It is now within Wrexham County Borough.

== Churches ==
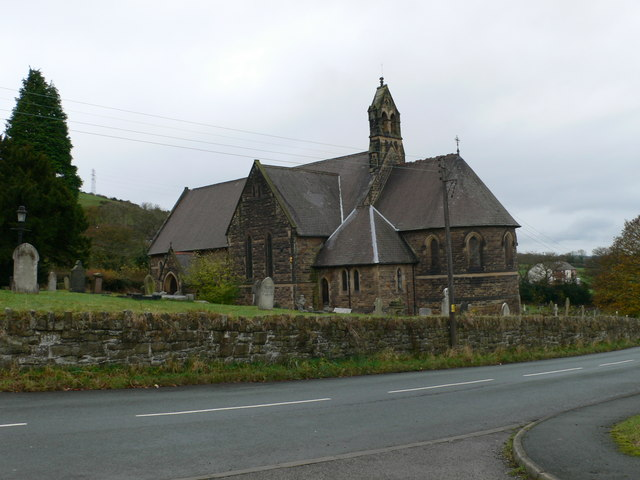
St Mary's, built in 1872 on the outskirts of the village after its predecessor was demolished due to subsidence

The first church in Brymbo was St John's, consecrated in 1838; it was closed in 1869 after it was affected by subsidence due to construction work on the Wrexham and Minera Railway. A replacement, consecrated to St. Mary, was built nearby, but in 1892 a second Anglican church (St John's) was built on the original site for the use of Welsh speakers. Predictably this church was also affected by subsidence and was demolished in the 1970s; its churchyard is now a small park including the village war memorial.

St Mary's church (built in 1872 to the designs of Thomas Henry Wyatt) and the "Tin Chapel" (Wesleyan or 'English' Methodist Church) remain in use. Brymbo had a large number of Nonconformist chapels, including Engedi (Calvinistic Methodist, 1820; closed 2003) Tabernacle (Welsh Baptist, 1864; closed 1987) and the Grade II listed Bryn Sion (Independent, 1861; closed 1968), all of which are now derelict or converted to other uses.

== Archaeology ==
In August 1958, workmen digging a pipe trench at Cheshire View in Brymbo made an important archaeological find – a burial site containing the remains commonly referred to as Brymbo Man or Brymbo Beaker Man, dating back to the early Bronze Age, around 1600BC. The remains were found in a burial chamber alongside a flint knife and earthenware beaker. It is believed that he was 5 feet 8 inches (1.73 m) tall and aged between 35 and 40 years. Brymbo Man was taken to the National Museum in Cardiff until May 1998 when it was returned to Wrexham. In 2001 Manchester University produced a wax model reconstruction of the skull which can also be seen in the galleries of Wrexham Museum.

Another archaeological find was made in 2003 by workers redeveloping the site of the former steelworks – a fossilised forest of the petrified wood of over 20 trees, dating from the Carboniferous Period. This finding offers a glimpse into the forest that would have stood in the area around 300 million years ago, long before coal lay beneath it. Five years of excavation led to the discovery of thousands of fossils. The resulting "Brymbo Fossil Forest" display, is set to be the centrepiece of the local "Stori Brymbo" project that is due to open for visitors in 2026.

The ancient earthwork Offa's Dyke passes close to the village; a long section was formerly visible close to Brymbo Hall. In 1892, Professor Thomas McKenny Hughes carried out the first scientific excavation of Offa's Dyke near Brymbo. The cartographer Samuel Lewis, in his Topographical Dictionary of Wales (1833), recorded that a large quantity of horse bones along with horse shoes "of rude workmanship" were found beneath the dyke near Brymbo Hall, but gave no other details.

== Historic buildings ==
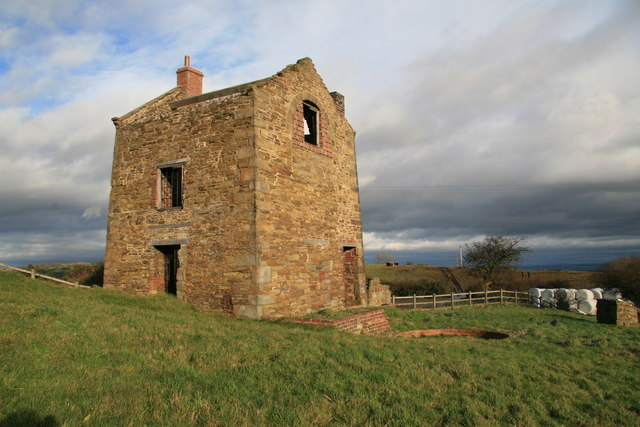
The Penrhos Engine House, built c.1794 by John Wilkinson

While there are few very old buildings in Brymbo, it contains several structures of interest in industrial archaeology, such as the original "No. 1" blast furnace commissioned by John Wilkinson, and associated buildings. Above the village stand the remains of Wilkinson's lead smelter, the "Bottle", next to a pond (locally known as the "Cold Pool") used to supply water to the Steelworks until 1990: in the nearby hamlet of Pen-Rhos is the Penrhos Engine House, also built by Wilkinson and now a Scheduled Ancient Monument.

== Notable births ==
- Geoff Charles, photojournalist.
- Sandy Mewies, Welsh Labour politician
- Thomas Price, politician, South Australian premier
- Christmas Price Williams MP Liberal

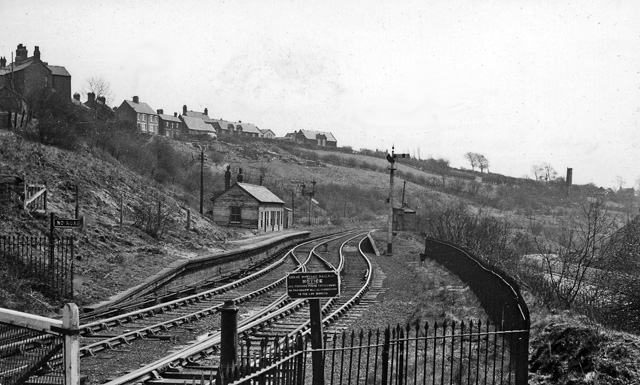
There was a GWR station in Brymbo until 1950

== Present day ==
The village itself has undergone restoration work to transform the site of the former Steelworks into a new development. The building firm, Taylor Wimpey built a new housing estate on the land in 2007, dubbed 'Mountain View' but this estate has been named 'Plas Brymbo' by locals, as there is a street named 'Mountain View' already, just off Cheshire View at the top of the village. It unhindered views of 'Hope Mountain'.

In 2017, a road which directly connects the estate to the village was opened, named Phoenix Drive.

In 2018 the Brymbo Heritage Trust received £1.1m to renovate the old steelworks building.
