= Red-short carbon steel =

Brittleness in steel at high temperature often caused by high sulfur levels

Red-short or hot-short steel is steel that becomes brittle at red-hot temperatures. This brittleness is often caused by high sulfur levels, in which case it is also known as sulfur embrittlement.

Iron or steel, when heated to above 460 °C (900 °F), glows with a red color. The color of heated iron changes predictably (due to black-body radiation) from dull red through orange and yellow to white, and can be a useful indicator of its temperature. Good quality iron or steel at and above this temperature becomes increasingly malleable and plastic. Red-short iron or steel, on the other hand, becomes crumbly and brittle.

== Sulfur hot-shortness ==
In steel contaminated by sulfur this embrittlement happens due to the sulfur forming iron sulfide/iron mixtures in the grain boundaries of the metal which have a lower melting point than the steel.

When the steel is heated up and worked, the mechanical energy added to the workpiece increases the temperature further. The iron sulfide (FeS) or iron/iron sulfide alloy (which has an even lower melting point) begins to melt, and the steel starts to separate at the grain boundaries. Steelmakers add manganese (Mn) to the steel when it is produced, to form manganese sulfide (MnS). Manganese sulfide inclusions have a higher melting point and do not concentrate at the grain boundaries. Thus, when the steel is later heated up and worked, the melting at the grain boundaries does not occur.

== Copper hot-shortness ==
Steel with elevated levels of copper, which may happen due to ore specifics but is more often cased by contamination of steel scrap, also exhibits hot-shortness. This is caused by selective oxidation of iron at the grain boundaries, where more noble and softer copper is enriched.
