= Brymbo Steelworks =

Former steelworks in Brymbo, Wales

Coordinates: 53.071°N 3.052°W

Brymbo Steel Works
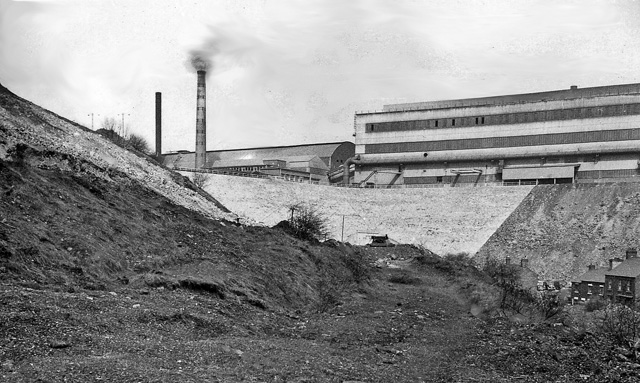
- Part of the works in April 1962
- Built: 1796
- Location: Brymbo
- Industry: Steel mill
- Products: Steel
- Defunct: 1990

The Brymbo Steel Works was a former large steelworks in the village of Brymbo near Wrexham, Wales. In operation between 1796 and 1990, it was significant on account of its founder, one of whose original blast furnace stacks remains on the site.

== History ==
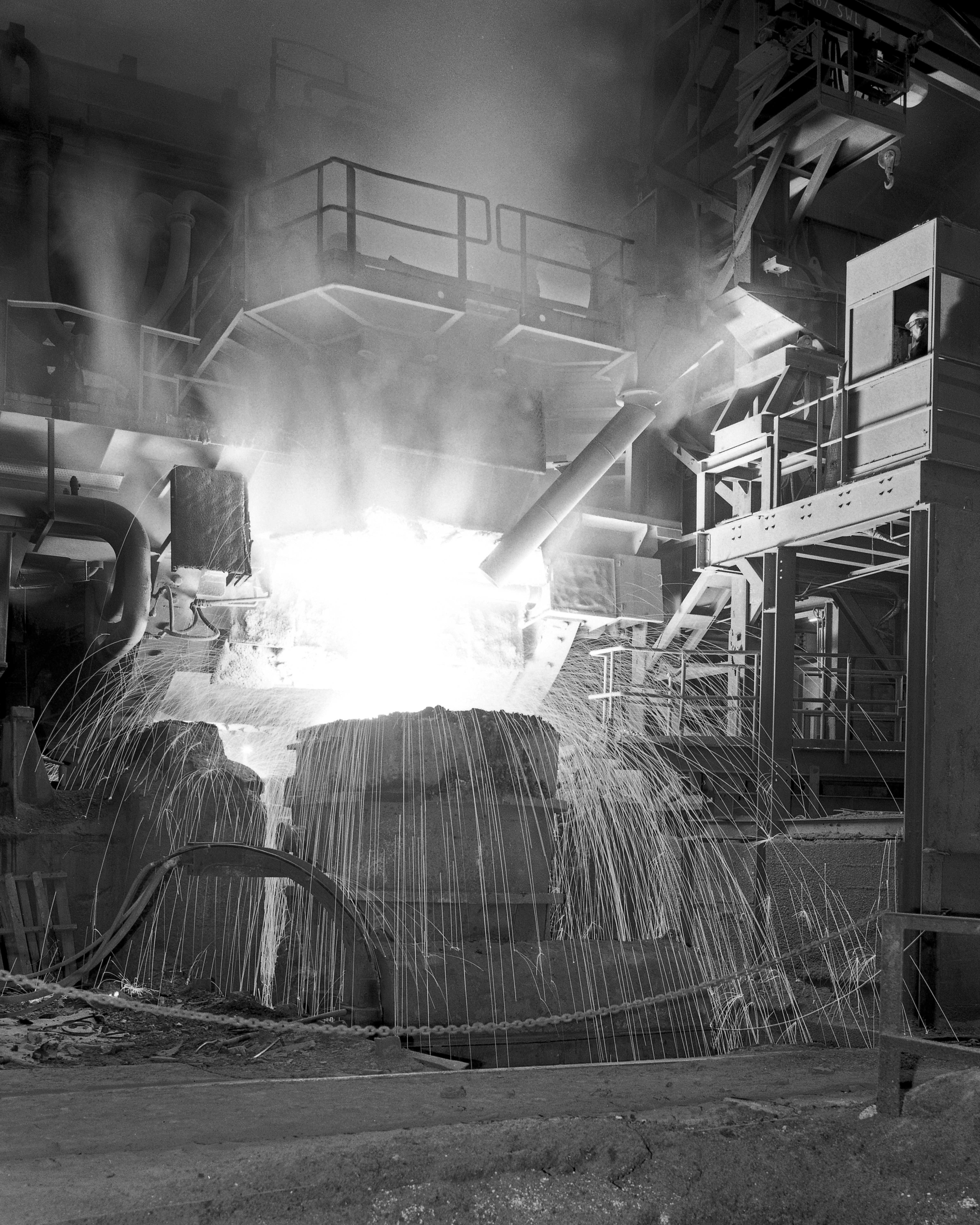
The steelworks in 1990

=== John Wilkinson's ironworks ===
The works was founded by the pioneer industrialist John 'Iron Mad' Wilkinson. Wilkinson, who had owned the nearby Bersham Ironworks jointly with his brother William, purchased Brymbo Hall and its 500-acre estate from the Assheton-Smith family in 1792 for the sum of £14,000, some of which may have been lent by Boulton and Watt. The estate was rich in coal and ironstone deposits, several small coal pits having existed even before Wilkinson purchased the estate. By 1796 Wilkinson had erected the first blast furnace on the site, east of the Hall, 884 tons of iron being produced in this first year. This initial furnace ("No. 1") worked continuously until 1894 when it was finally 'blown out', and continued in use afterwards as a sand hopper. From 1805 a second furnace was brought into production.

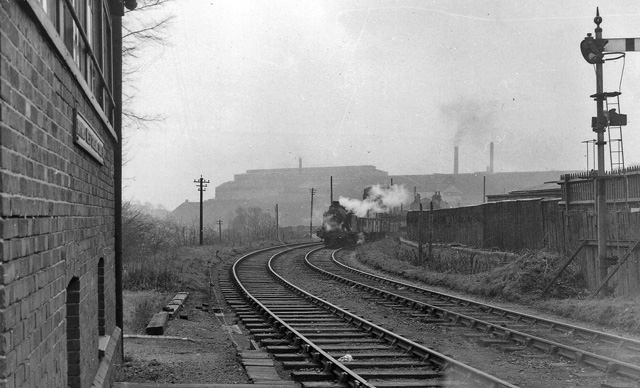
Freight train with the steelworks' Melting Shop in the background, 1962

After Wilkinson's death, his estate was contested between his natural children, who he had fathered with the Brymbo Hall housekeeper Ann Lewis, and his nephew Thomas Jones. The cost of the actions in the Court of Chancery were to bankrupt Jones and to absorb much of the inheritance of Wilkinson's children. The ironworks lay idle for some years, with a few attempts at restarting production, one of which was made by the ironmaster John Thompson.

=== Development by Henry Robertson ===
In 1841, the works and estate were to be bought by Robert Roy (one of the Brymbo estate's trustees) and in 1842 were handed to Henry Robertson to develop. Robertson engaged William Henry Darby and Charles Edward Darby, grandsons of Abraham Darby III of Coalbrookdale, to manage the works. The works gradually expanded, and in 1854 he bought out Roy's share of the business, local tradition stating that the transaction was decided by a horse race which the steelworks employees, favouring Robertson, ensured he won.

After the deaths of William and Charles Darby in 1882 and 1884 respectively, the business was incorporated as Brymbo Steel Co. Ltd. Robertson encouraged John Henry Darby, the son of William, and Peter Williams (father of the MP Christmas Price Williams, who was born at Brymbo) to trial steelmaking using the open-hearth process. The first tap was recorded by Robertson in December 1883 and by January 1885 Brymbo had produced its first commercial steel in a plant which was the first of its kind in the United Kingdom.

=== Guest, Keen and Nettlefolds ===
The effects of the Great Depression caused the works to go bankrupt in 1931. The plant was saved, and production restarted, by Henry Robertson's son, Sir Henry Beyer Robertson (1862–1948). Robertson formed a new company and put Emrys Davies and Thomas Roberts in charge of production, as well as negotiating a lucrative contract to supply engineering steel for Rolls-Royce Limited aero engines. The business changed company name again in 1948, on the latter occasion becoming a part of GKN. From 1956 onwards the works were hugely expanded, new electric furnaces being sited on an artificial hill made from furnace waste. A further expansion in the early 1970s resulted in the construction of a large, modern rolling mill south of the main steelworks site.

Brymbo was nationalised with the rest of the steel industry in 1967, becoming a division of British Steel Corporation. In 1978, the steelworks took its single automated blast furnace out of use, and concentrated on the production of high-quality steels from scrap metal.

The works were served by the Wrexham and Minera Branch of the Great Western Railway, later of British Railways. During its history the steelworks was involved with or supported a number of other industrial sites in the immediate area, including collieries (with the Blast Pit being located within the works itself) and a brickworks at Cae-llo which produced firebricks until 1975.

Steel production lasted until 1990, when the steelworks was closed by its then owners, United Engineering Steels. 1,100 jobs were lost.

== Today ==
In 1992, the site was purchased by Parkhill Estates and land remediated. The site is now being developed to support large amounts of housing. It is currently planned to keep the long-standing Machine Shop and No 1 blast furnace, both original buildings.

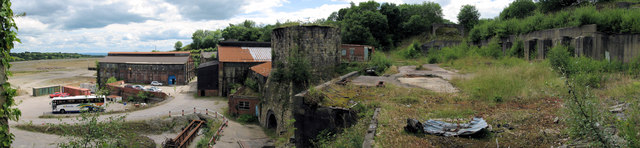
Panoramic view, taken from the old blast furnace charging bank, of a small part of the former steelworks site. At the centre is Wilkinson's original No. 1 blast furnace, later used as a sand hopper. The plateau in the distance was later the site of the main melting shop

A new major road has been built recently to connect the village of Brymbo to the new Mountain View houses on the former steelworks site. The road was opened in June 2021 and now opens up plans for more development such as a school, retail areas and business options. Stori Brymbo, a heritage visitor attraction, is under development on the steelworks site.

== Sport ==
Brymbo Steelworks had a football team that won a number of local leagues.
