= John Wilkinson (industrialist) =

English industrialist

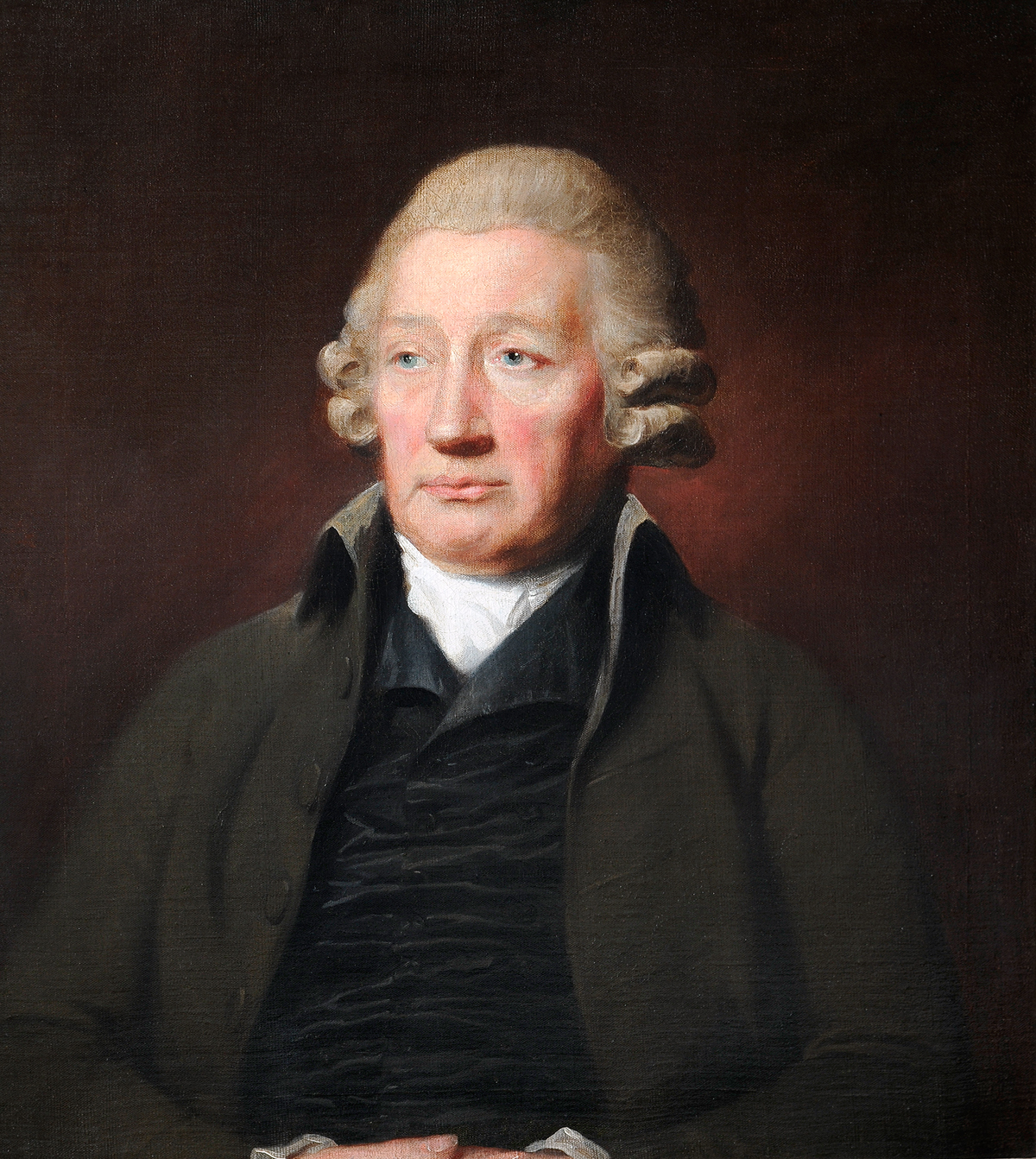
- Wilkinson by Lemuel Francis Abbott
- Born: 1728; Little Clifton, Cumberland, England
- Died: 14 July 1808 (aged 79–80); Bradley, Staffordshire, England
- Resting place: Lindale Church, Lindale-in-Cartmel, England
- Occupations: Ironmaster, Entrepreneur, builder of first iron boat, partner in world's first iron bridge
- Website: broseley.org.uk

John "Iron-Mad" Wilkinson (1728 – 14 July 1808) was an English industrialist who pioneered the manufacture of cast iron and the use of cast-iron goods during the Industrial Revolution. He was the inventor of a precision cannon boring method that made cannons of greater accuracy and reliability than ever before. He invented a method for precision boring of large steam engine cylinders essential for the operation of the steam engines of James Watt, for which he was given an exclusive contract. His boring machine has been called the first machine tool. He also developed a blowing device for blast furnaces that allowed higher temperatures, increasing their efficiency, and helped sponsor the first iron bridge in Coalbrookdale. Apart from being the ironmaster of several iron foundries (Bersham, New and Old Willey, Bradley and Brymbo), he had lead mines, coal mines, a lead smelter, a lead pipe factory (in London), shares in copper mines in Wales and Cornwall, he built the first iron commercial barge, was invested in canal building, and also was involved in banks and minted his own coins for his workers known as 'Willeys'.

== Biography ==
=== Early life ===
John Wilkinson was born in Little Clifton, Bridgefoot, Cumberland (now part of Cumbria), the eldest son of Isaac Wilkinson and Mary Johnson. Isaac was then the potfounder at the blast furnace there, one of the first to use coke instead of charcoal, which was pioneered by Abraham Darby.

John and his half-brother William, who was 17 years younger, were raised in a non-conformist Presbyterian family and he was educated at a dissenting academy at Kendal, Westmorland (also now part of Cumbria), run by Dr Caleb Rotherham. His sister Mary married another non-conformist, Joseph Priestley in 1762. Priestley also played a role in educating John's younger brother, William.

In 1745, when John was 17, he was apprenticed to a Liverpool merchant for five years and then entered into partnership with his father.

When his father moved to Bersham furnace near Wrexham, north Wales, in 1753 John remained at Kirkby Lonsdale in Westmorland where he married Ann Maudesley on 12 June 1755.

=== Iron master ===
After working with his father in his foundry, from 1755 John Wilkinson became a partner in the Bersham concern and in 1757 with partners, he erected a blast furnace at Willey, near Broseley in Shropshire. Later he built another furnace and works at New Willey. He made his home in Broseley in a house called 'The Lawns' which became his headquarters for many years. He had houses either side of 'The Lawns' which served for administration, one being named 'The Mint' used for distribution of the thousands of tokens, each valued equivalent to a halfpenny. In east Shropshire he also developed iron works at Snedshill, Hollinswood, Hadley and Hampton Loade. He and Edward Blakeway also leased land to build another works at Bradley in Bilston parish, near Wolverhampton. He became known as the 'Father' of the extensive South Staffordshire iron industry with Bilston as the start of the Black Country. In 1761, he took over Bersham Ironworks as well. Bradley became his largest and most successful enterprise, and was the site of extensive experiments in getting raw coal to substitute for coke in the production of cast iron. At its peak, it included a number of blast furnaces, a brick works, potteries, glass works, and rolling mills. The Birmingham Canal was subsequently built near the Bradley works.

In 1792, Wilkinson bought the Brymbo Hall estate in Denbighshire, not far from Bersham, where furnaces and other plant were installed. After his death and the decline of his industrial empire, the ironworks lay idle for some years until in 1842. It became once again an important works and eventually became Brymbo Steelworks, which continued to operate until 1990.

== Inventions ==
Wilkinson was a prolific inventor of new products and processes, and especially anything connected with novel uses of cast iron and wrought iron. His development of a machine tool for boring cast iron cannons presaged the accurate boring of cylinders for the first Watt steam engines. He also improved the air supply for the blast furnace using a new design of bellows, and was the first to use wrought iron in canal barges. He supported the construction of the first important cast iron bridge at Coalbrookdale.

=== Cannon boring machine (UK Patent 1063 of 1774) ===
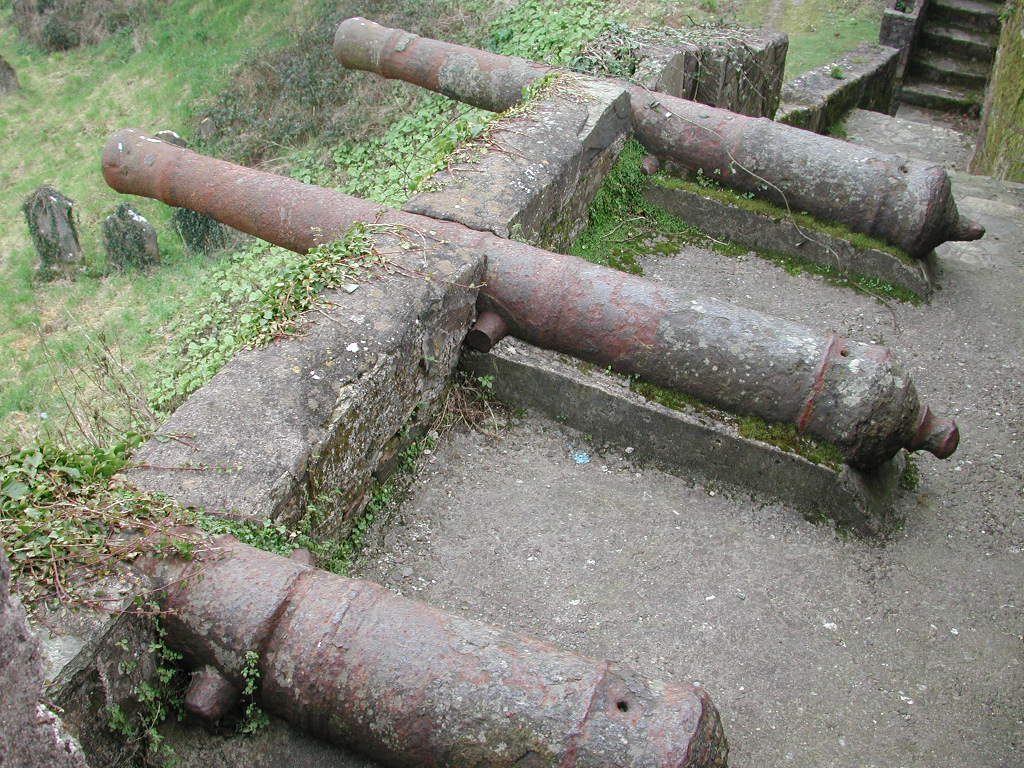
Iron cannons at Youghal, County Cork, Ireland

Bersham became well known for high-quality casting and a producer of guns and cannon. Historically, cannons had been cast with a core and then bored to remove imperfections, but in 1774 Wilkinson patented a technique for boring iron guns from a solid piece, rotating the gun barrel rather than the boring-bar. This technique made the guns more accurate since the bore was uniform in diameter, and less likely to explode. While bronze cannons were already being bored from the solid, the boring of large iron naval cannon was novel. The patent was quashed in 1779 (the Royal Navy saw it as a monopoly and sought to overthrow it) but Wilkinson still remained a major manufacturer.

=== Cutting Spiral Grooves in the bore of Cannon (UK Patent 1694 of 1789) ===
It was a long established principle dating back to the 16th century that spiral grooves in a gun barrel could spin the projectile and thereby improve its accuracy. In 1789 John Wilkinson devised and patented a way to machine rifling into the bore of cannons, though this was not to come into use until the mid-19th century probably due to the difficulty to get the ammunition easy to load while engaging with the rifling.

=== Boring machine for steam engines ===
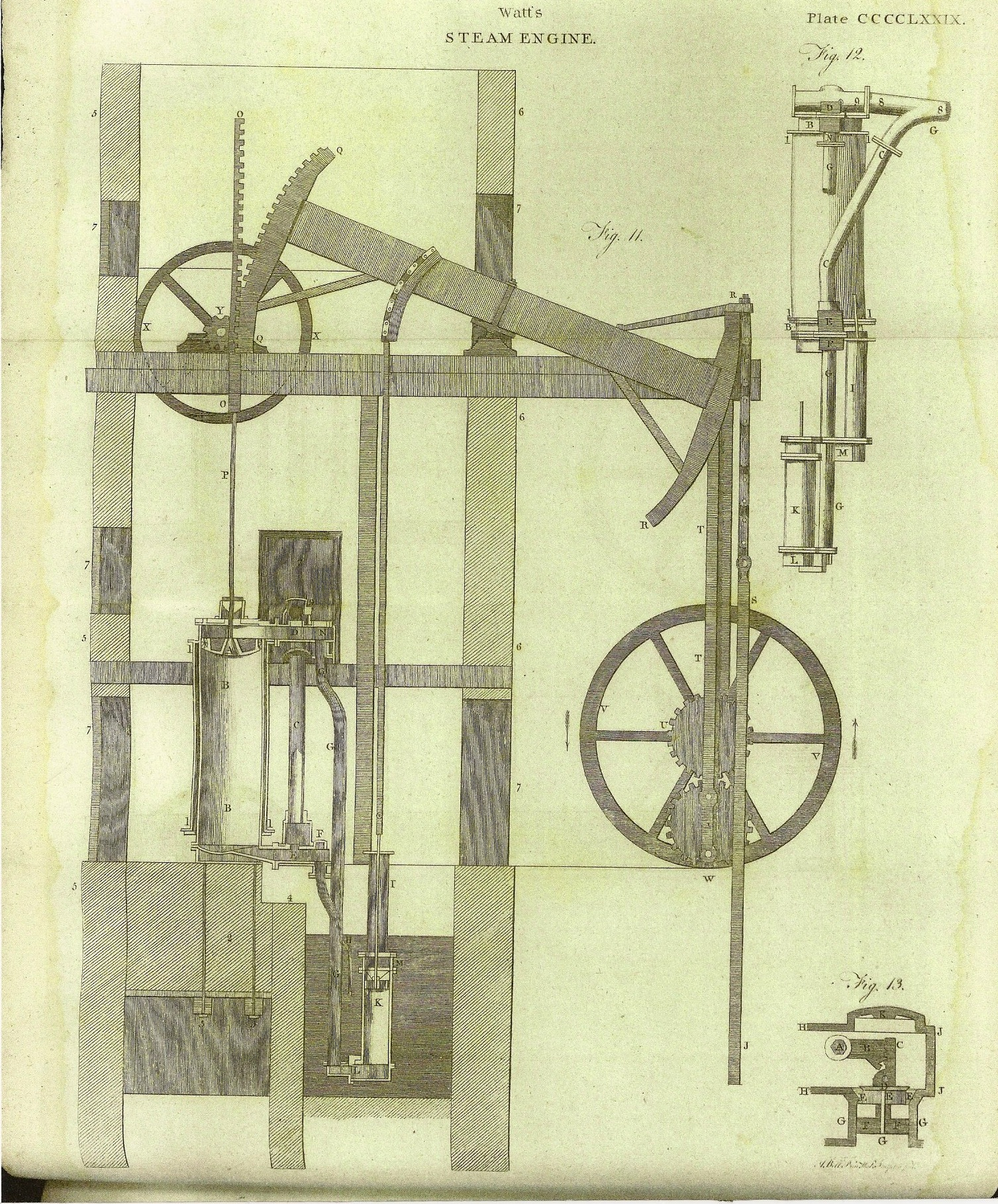
Steam engine by James Watt (1797)

James Watt had tried unsuccessfully for several years to obtain accurately bored cylinders for his steam engines, and was forced to use hammered iron, which was out of round and caused leakage past the piston. In 1774 John Wilkinson invented a boring machine in which the shaft that held the cutting tool extended through the cylinder and was supported on both ends, unlike the cantilevered borers then in use. With this machine he was able to bore the cylinder for Boulton & Watt's first commercial engine, and was given an exclusive contract for the provision of cylinders owing to the lower tolerance between the piston and cylinder and the resulting improvement in efficiency by lowering steam losses through the gap. Until this era, advancements in drilling and boring practice had lain only within the application field of gun barrels for firearms and cannon; Wilkinson's achievement was a milestone in the gradual development of boring technology, as its fields of application broadened into engines, pumps, and other industrial uses.

While the main market for steam engines had been for pumping water out of mines, he saw much more use for them in the driving of machinery in ironworks such as blowing engines, forge hammers and rolling mills, the first rotary action steam engine being installed at Bradley in 1783. Among his many inventions was a reversing rolling mill with two steam cylinders that made the process much more economical (UK Patent 1857 of 1792).

John Wilkinson took a key interest in obtaining orders for these more efficient steam engines and other uses for cast iron from the owners of Cornish copper mines. As part of this interest, he bought shares in eight of the mines to help provide capital.

=== Method for Making Lead Pipes (UK Patent No 1735 of 1790) ===
He patented a method for making lead pipes, which involved casting pipes then inserting an iron mandrel and then repeatedly rolling them through rollers with grooves of reducing size until the desired dimensions were obtained. To exploit the patent he built a lead pipe works at Rotherhithe, London. This factory lasted for many years eventually making the solder filler alloys used in the car factory at Dagenham.

== Iron Bridge ==
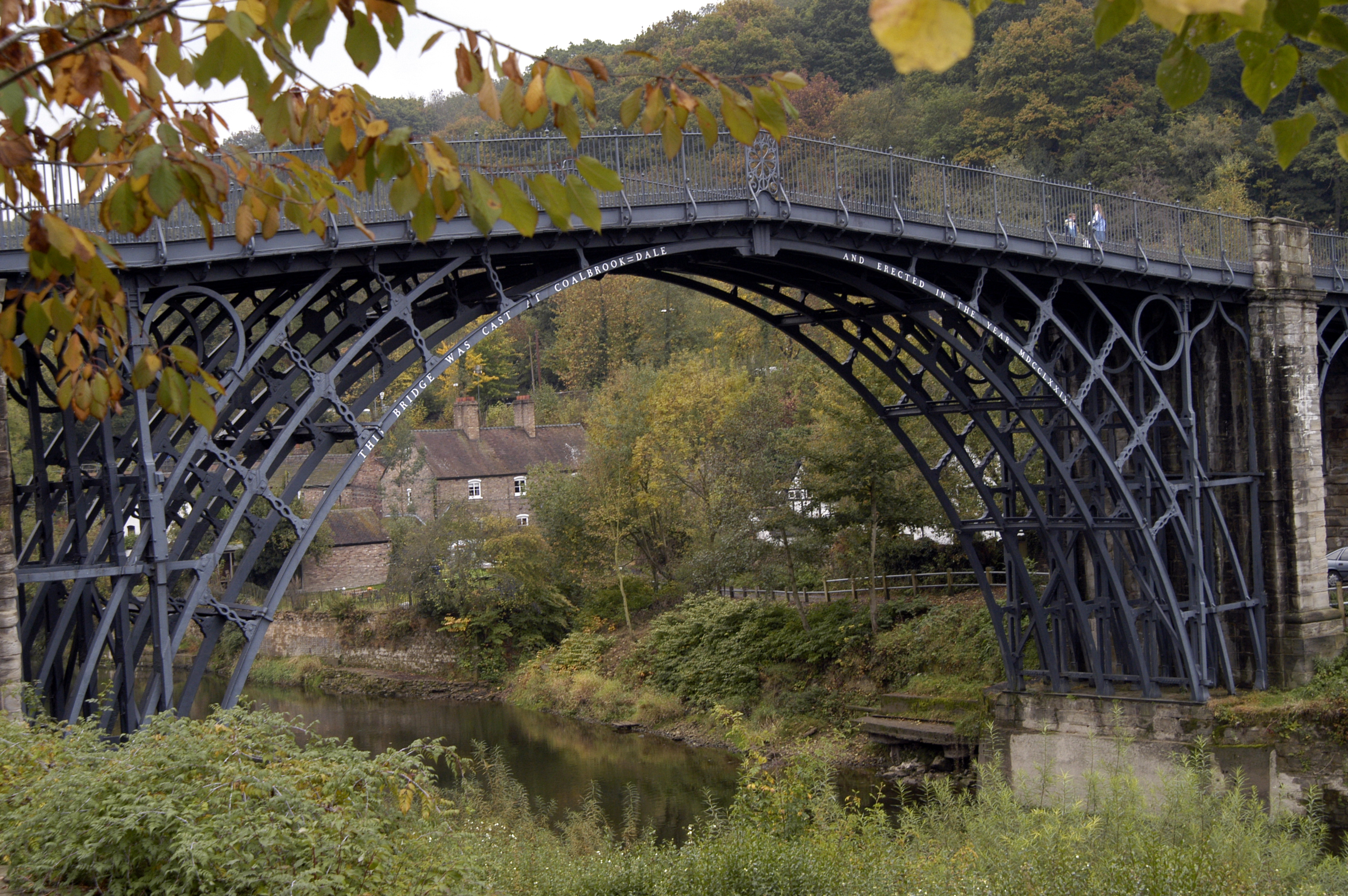
The Iron Bridge spanning the River Severn in Shropshire

In 1775, John Wilkinson was the prime mover initiating the building of the Iron Bridge connecting the then-important industrial town of Broseley with the other side of the River Severn. His friend Thomas Farnolls Pritchard had written to him with plans for the bridge. A committee of subscribers was formed, mostly including Broseley businessmen, to agree to the use of iron rather than wood or stone and obtain price quotations and an authorising act of Parliament.

Wilkinson's persuasion and drive held together the group's support through several problems during the parliamentary process. Had Wilkinson not succeeded in this and also drawn support from influential parliamentarians, the bridge might not have been built or might have been made of other materials. Consequently, the name 'Ironbridge' would not have been coined for the district in Madeley; the area would not have attained the status of a World Heritage Site. Abraham Darby III was chosen as the preferred builder after quoting to build the bridge for £3,150/-/-. When construction started, Wilkinson sold his shares to Abraham Darby III in 1777, leaving the latter to steer the project to its successful conclusion in 1779 and be opened in 1781.

In 1787, he launched the first barge made of wrought iron, constructed in Broseley. It was a development which would become common over the years ahead and in large ships in the following century. He patented several other inventions.

== Copper interests ==
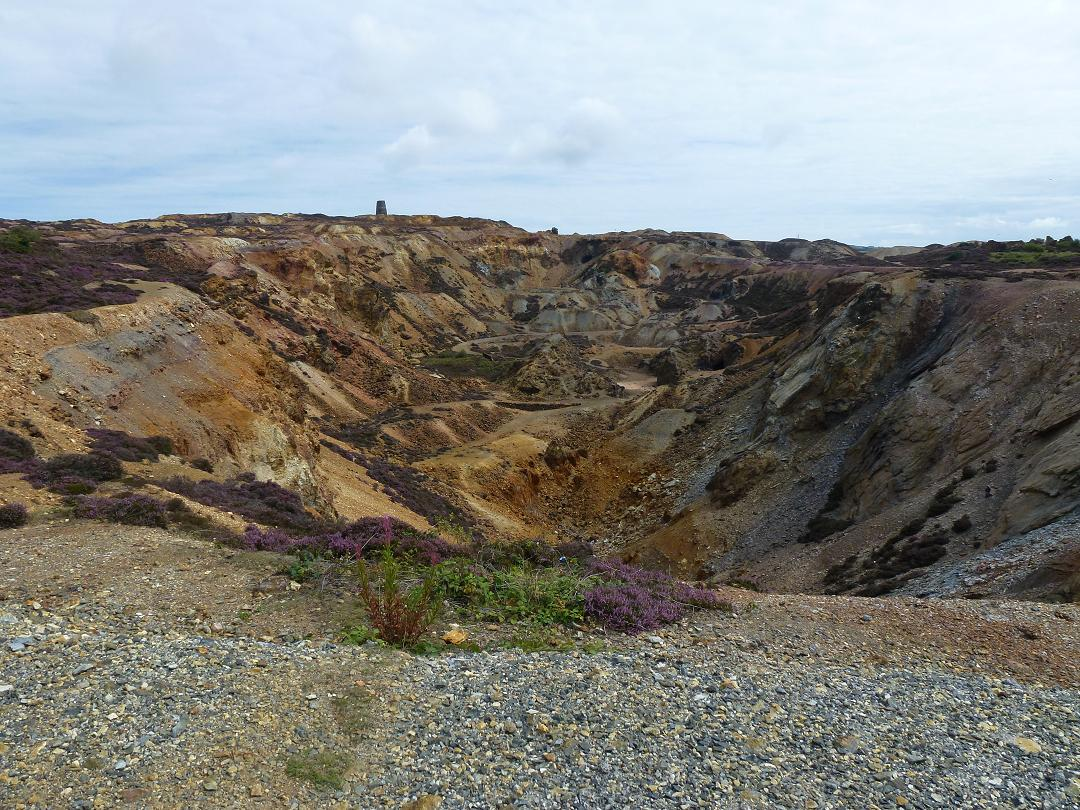
Parys Mountain opencast copper mine

John Wilkinson made his fortune selling high quality goods made of iron and reached his limit of investment expansion. His expertise proved useful when he invested in many copper interests. In 1761, the Royal Navy clad the hull of the frigate HMS Alarm with copper sheet to reduce the growth of marine biofouling and prevent attack by the Teredo shipworm. The drag from the hull growth cut the speed and the shipworm caused severe hull damage, especially in tropical waters. After the success of this work the Navy decreed that all ships should be clad and this created a large demand for copper that Wilkinson noted during his visits to shipyards. He bought shares in eight Cornish copper mines and met Thomas Williams, the 'Copper King' of the Parys Mountain mines in Anglesey. Besides supplying Williams with large quantities of plate and equipment, Wilkinson also supplied iron scrap for the process of recovery of copper from solution by cementation. Wilkinson bought a 1/16th share in the Mona Mine at Parys Mountain and shares in Williams industries at Holywell, Flintshire, St Helens, near Liverpool and Swansea, South Wales. Wilkinson and Williams worked together on several projects. They were amongst the first to issue trade tokens ('Willys' and 'Druids') to alleviate the shortage of small coins. Jointly they set up the Cornish Metal Company in 1785 as a marketing company for copper. Its aim was to ensure both a good return for the Cornish miners and a stable price for the users of copper. Warehouses were set up in Birmingham, London, Bristol and Liverpool.

To help his business interests and to service his trade tokens, Wilkinson bought into partnerships with banks in Birmingham, Bilston, Bradley, Brymbo and Shrewsbury.

== Lead mines and works ==
Wilkinson invested in lead mines at Minera in Wrexham, five miles from Bersham, Llyn Pandy at Soughton (now Sychdyn) and Mold, also in Flintshire. He installed steam pumping engines to make them viable again. At the Maesffynnon Wen mine in Minera, where he became the major partner in 1783, he installed a steam pumping engine in 1784. This mine continued after his death as a joint operation between Mr Kirk and John Wilkinson's executors and found good ore between the Cabin and Harrison shafts in 1817. In the 1790s he built a lead smelter on his Brymbo Estate. His lead was exported through the port of Chester. He patented a method for making lead pipes (UK Patent No 1735 of 1790), and to exploit this he built a lead pipe works at Rotherhithe, London. This factory lasted for many years eventually making the solder filler alloys used in the car factory at Dagenham.

== Philanthropy ==
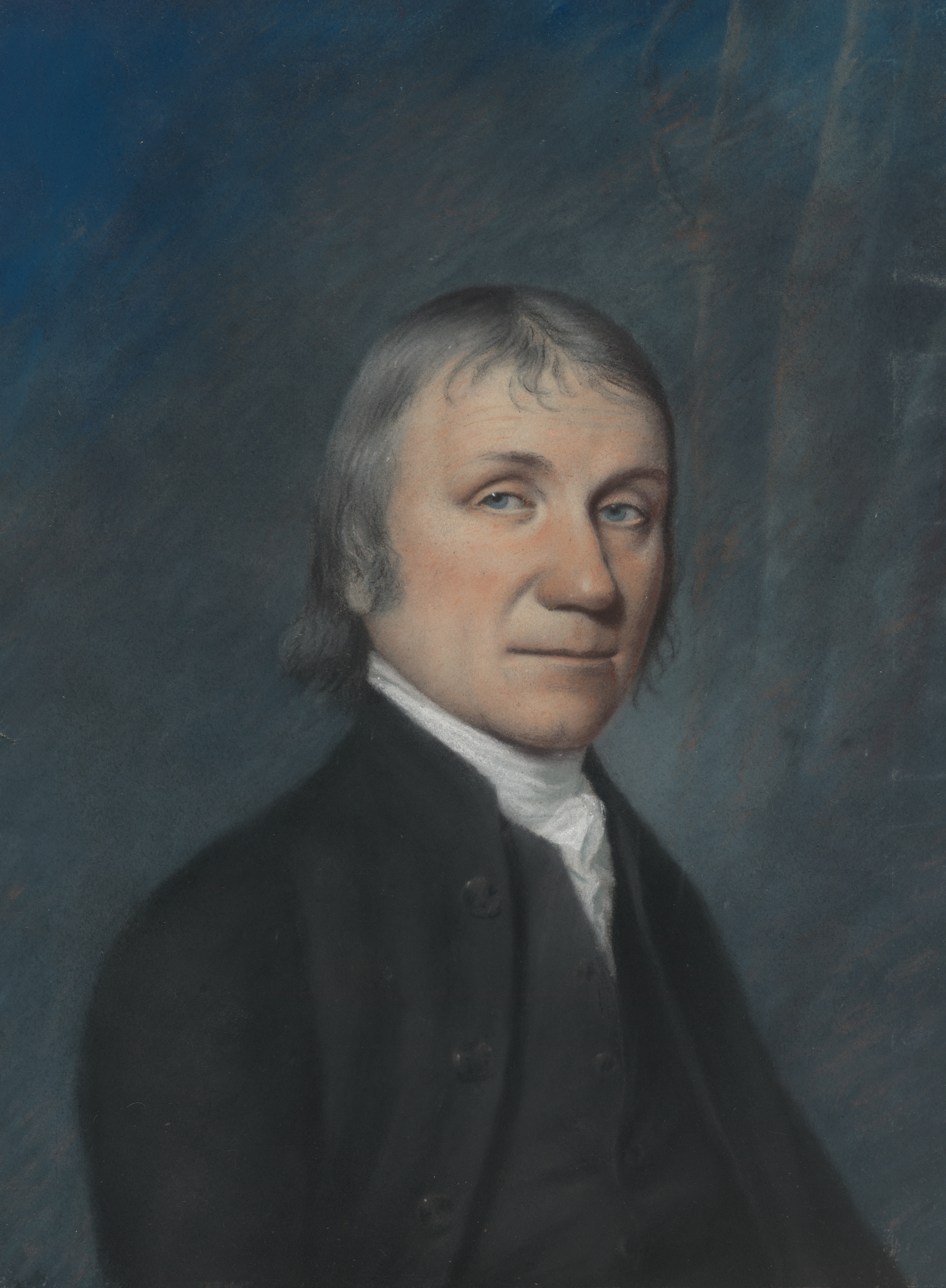
Joseph Priestley, by James Sharples, c. 1797

Wilkinson had a good reputation as an employer. Wherever new works were established, cottages were built to accommodate employees and their families. He gave significant financial support to his brother-in-law, the famous chemist Dr Joseph Priestley. He became a church warden in Broseley and was later elected High Sheriff of Denbighshire. In schools that had no slates he was able to provide iron troughs to hold sand for the practice of writing and arithmetic. He provided a cast-iron pulpit for the church at Bilston.

== Family life, and death ==
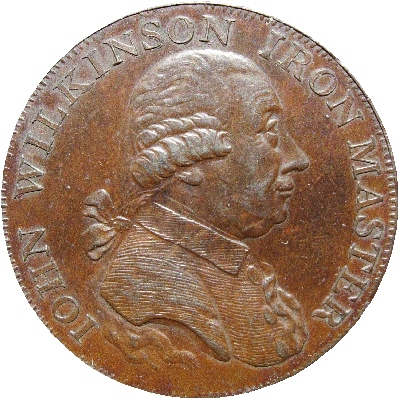
John Wilkinson, as depicted on a 1793 halfpenny token struck by Matthew Boulton's Soho Mint

John married Ann Mawdsley in 1755. She died in Wrexham on 17 November 1756 aged 23, after having John's first child, Mary, on the previous 13 April. Her memorial, designed by Thomas Farnolls Pritchard, can be seen in Wrexham church. Her family was wealthy and her legacy helped to pay for a share in the New Willey Company in 1757. His second marriage, when he was 35, was to Mary Lee, aged 43, whose money helped him to buy out his partners, however the couple had no children. When he was in his seventies, his mistress Mary Ann Lewis, a maid at his estate in Brymbo Hall, gave birth to three children, a boy and two girls.

By 1796, when he was 68, he was producing about one-eighth of Britain's cast iron. He became "a titan" – very wealthy, and somewhat eccentric. His "iron madness" reached a peak in the 1790s, when he had almost everything around him made of iron, even several coffins and a massive obelisk to mark his grave, which still stands in the village of Lindale-in-Cartmel, Lancashire, now in Cumbria. He was appointed Sheriff of Denbighshire for 1799.

He died on 14 July 1808 at his works in Bradley, probably from diabetes. He was originally buried at his Castlehead estate at Grange-over-Sands, raised above the adjoining moss lands which he drained and improved from 1778 onwards.

He left a very large estate in his will (more than £130,000 - equivalent to £9,930,000 in 2025), to which he intended to make his three children the principal heirs, with executors to manage the estate for them. However his nephew Thomas Jones contested the will in the Court of Chancery. By 1828, the estate had largely been dissipated by lawsuits and poor management. His corpse, in its distinctive iron coffin, was moved several times over the next decades, but is now lost.

== Bibliography ==
- Braid, Douglas. Wilkinson Studies Vol II (1992) ISBN 0-9520009-0-3.
- Chaloner, W.H. "Builders of Industry: John Wilkinson, Ironmaster." History Today (1951) 1#5 pp 63–69.
- J. R. Harris, Wilkinson, John (1728–1808). Oxford Dictionary of National Biography, Oxford University Press, 2004; online edn, Jan 2011.
- Newman, J. and Pevsner, N. Pevsner Architectural Guides: The Buildings of Shropshire, Yale University Press (2006). ISBN 0-300-12083-4.
- Soldon, Norbert C. John Wilkinson (1728–1808): English Ironmaster and Inventor. Studies in British History, Edwin Mellen Press, (1998) ISBN 0-7734-8268-7.
