= Brymbo Hall =

Welsh manor house, demolished 1973

- Eastern side of the house, taken in 1908
- Interactive map of the Brymbo Hall area

General information
- Architectural style: Some Baroque / Palladian elements
- Location: Brymbo, Denbighshire, Wales
- Coordinates: 53.072780°N 3.056029°W
- Completed: 1624 (part)
- Demolished: 1973

Design and construction
- Architect: Inigo Jones (attrib.)

Brymbo Hall, one of Britain's lost houses, was a manor house located near Brymbo outside the town of Wrexham, North Wales. The house, reputed to have been built partly to the designs of Inigo Jones, was noted as the residence of 18th-century industrialist and ironmaster John "Iron-Mad" Wilkinson.

== Early history ==
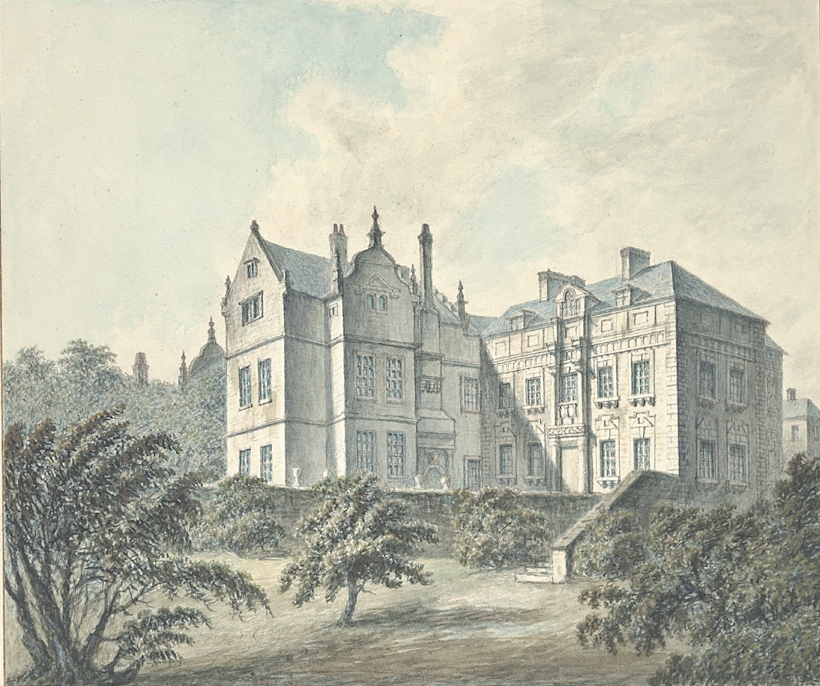
Brombo House, 1794

The estate was located on the upland moors around 3 miles (4.8 km) north-west of Wrexham. Its early history is relatively obscure, the deeds having been destroyed in a fire in 1794, but it is thought that a house had been constructed on the site in the late 15th century for Edward ap Morgan ap Madoc, gentleman. Edward's son, Gruffydd, founded the locally prominent Griffith family in the early 16th century, and a more modern house was built in 1624 for Edward's descendant John Griffith.

A persistent local tradition claimed not only that Inigo Jones designed the 1624 building, but that he was born at the old Brymbo Hall (little is recorded of Jones's early life but he is generally thought to have been born in London, though he was of Welsh descent). A portico at the house, dated 1624, was more firmly attributed to the architect, though it was later noted that the aedicular doorway was a copy of Plate 158 in Sebastiano Serlio's Fourth Book, the Regole generali d'architettura (1537). Jones was also considered to have designed the chapel set in the grounds of the house. The main 1624 building was later extended by an eastern wing featuring a giant order of Doric pilasters.

In 1649 Brymbo Hall was acquired by Sir Richard Saltonstall, an early settler in New England, on his return to Britain. By the close of the 17th century it was again occupied by the Griffith family, being owned by Robert Griffith, who served as High Sheriff of Denbighshire in 1684–1685. Robert's only son John matriculated at Christ Church, Oxford in 1695, aged 18, but appears to have died, without issue, before his parents, as the property was inherited by Robert's daughter Mary. As a highly marriageable heiress, Mary married first Robert Jeffreys of Acton Hall and after his death Richard Clayton of Lea Hall in Shropshire. She then married her third husband, Arthur Owen, a member of the Owen family of Brogyntyn, Shropshire. Her daughter Jane Clayton married Watkin Wynne of Voelas; their daughter, Elizabeth Wynne, married Thomas Assheton Smith I. During the mid-18th century the estate was the subject of several lawsuits between relatives of Richard Clayton and Arthur Owen.

Brymbo Hall and Estate came up for sale in August 1790. Included in the sale were 622 acres of farmland with tenants, "valuable and extensive coal mines, which are now open and worked with very considerable advantage together with all that lead mine now in working on the estate", and the water corn mill in Minera.

== Purchase by John Wilkinson ==
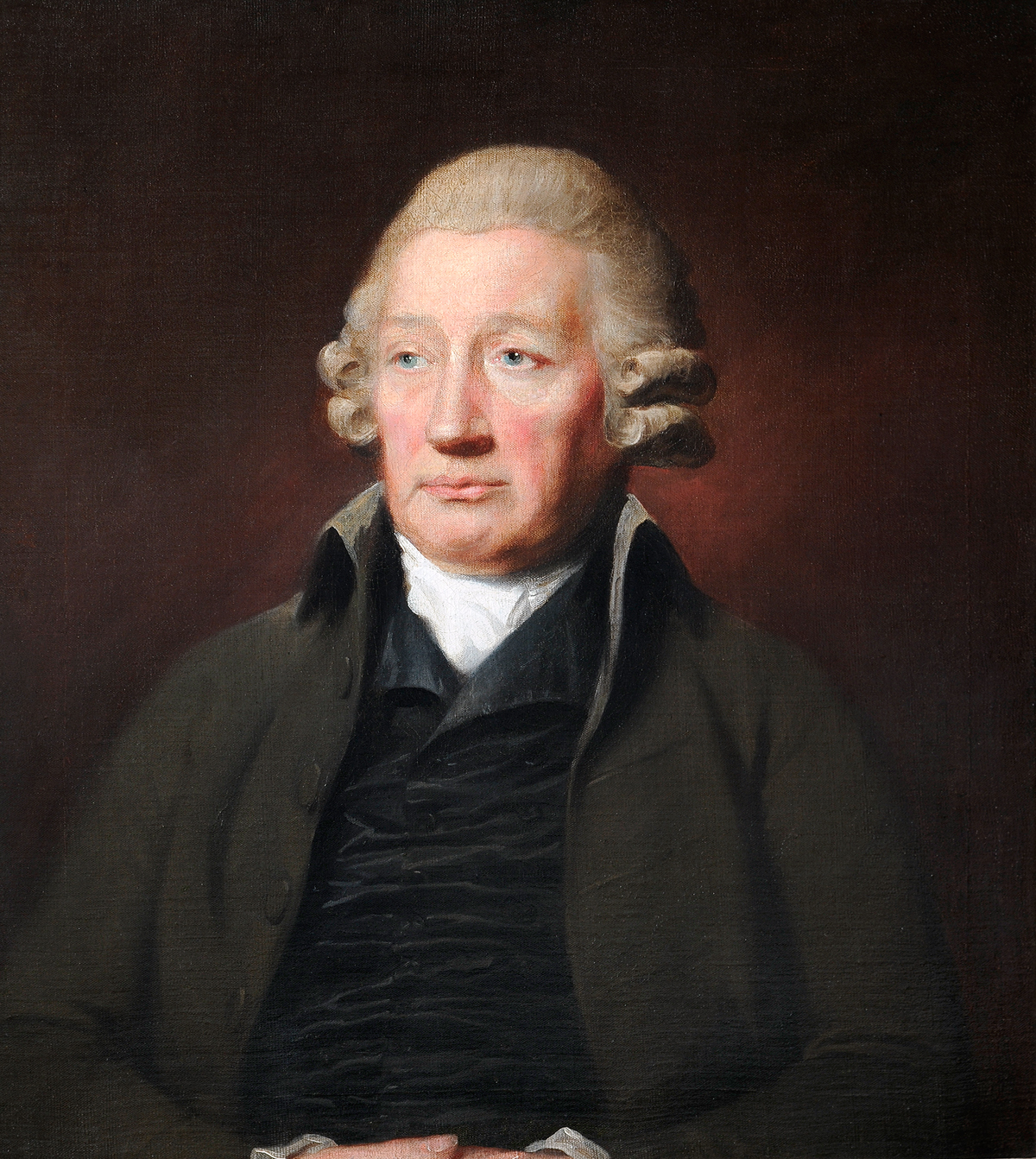
Portrait of ironmaster John Wilkinson, who purchased the Hall and its estate in 1792

John Wilkinson bought the 500-acre (2.0 km^{2}) Brymbo Hall estate in 1792 for the sum of £14,000. The land was rich in coal and ironstone deposits, and Wilkinson constructed an ironworks (later to become the Brymbo Steelworks) near the Hall. After his death, his son occasionally lived at the property, and the estate was later managed by William Legh, the father of William Legh, 1st Baron Newton. However, the estate was sold to pay the costs of a complex and long-running lawsuit between Wilkinson's heirs; by 1841 it had been purchased by the barrister Robert Roy, one of the original trustees appointed on Wilkinson's death. Roy, with Henry Robertson and others, formed the Brymbo Mineral & Railway Company and restarted iron production on the estate. The house itself was later occupied by the Darby family, descendants of Abraham Darby III, who were appointed as the ironworks' managers.

During the late 19th century Brymbo Hall was the country home of the Liberal MP for Denbighshire, George Osborne Morgan; another Liberal MP, Christmas Price Williams, grew up there.

The Hall was largely unoccupied after 1930 and fell into disrepair. It became partly derelict after World War II, when it was used by the military, and its lower floors were used by a local farmer for keeping livestock. It was demolished in 1973 when open cast mining was carried out on the site. It is considered to be one of the most unfortunate architectural losses in Wales.

== Local traditions ==
In addition to the Inigo Jones tradition, a local story said that the house, and the road leading to it, were haunted by a "grey lady", supposed to be the ghost of Jane Wynn, who lived there alone in the 18th century following the death of her husband. Another tale concerned a room in which shutters would refuse to stay closed, following the death of the (apocryphal) daughter of a 19th-century owner.

A stand of twelve trees in the grounds was known as the "Twelve Apostles" or "Twelve Disciples"; the trees were eventually uprooted by the National Coal Board. There may be a link to the Twelve Apostles lead mine in Minera, known from the formation of the Twelve Apostles Amalgamated Mine in 1863.

== Other sources ==
- Lloyd, T. Lost Houses of Wales, Save Britain's Heritage, 1986
