= Little Clifton =

Village in Cumbria, England

Coordinates: 54.644°N 3.464°W

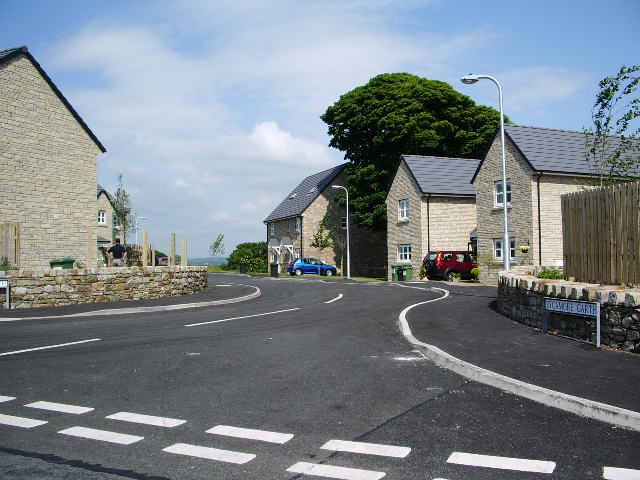

- Location in Allerdale, Cumbria Location within Cumbria
- Population: 480 (2011)
- OS grid reference: NY0553 528651
- Civil parish: Little Clifton
- Unitary authority: Cumberland
- Ceremonial county: Cumbria
- Region: North West
- Country: England
- Sovereign state: United Kingdom
- Post town: Workington
- Postcode district: CA14
- Dialling code: 01900
- Police: Cumbria
- Fire: Cumbria
- Ambulance: North West
- UK Parliament: Whitehaven and Workington

Population decline in Little Clifton

Little Clifton is a village and civil parish in the non-metropolitan county of Cumberland located on the edge of the Lake District in the ceremonial county of Cumbria, England. In 2001, it had a population of 391 and contained 170 households; increasing to a population of 480 in the 2011 Census with 207 households.

The village of Little Clifton is 3.5 miles (6 km) east of Workington. The River Derwent is roughly 1 mile (2 km) north of Little Clifton. In 1887, John Bartholomew, whilst writing for the Gazetteer of the British Isles, described Little Clifton as a township of 489 persons next to Workington. Workington was, at that time, a district within the former county of Cumberland.

== Governance ==
Little Clifton, is part of the Whitehaven and Workington constituency of the UK parliament.

For Local Government purposes it is administered by the Cumberland unitary authority.

Little Clifton has its own Parish Council; Little Clifton Parish Council.

== Early area history and toponymy ==
Cumbria is formed of the older counties of Cumberland, Westmorland, parts of north Lancashire and North Yorkshire. There are signs of human inhabitancy as early as 5000 years ago with stone circles discovered under 20 miles east of Little Clifton at Long Meg and Castlerigg amongst other places. The early settlements are in areas suitable for crafting tools such as stone axes and became the source for quarrying in the area.
Celtic immigration began around 500BC and developed in Cumbria as Brigantes. Celtic Brigantians had a major settlement at Carlisle and inhabited the area later known as Rheged around 100CE. The Celts flourished following Roman rule after the transitional period of Roman rule to Celtic rule c350-420AD. Anglo Saxon invasion absorbed Rheged into the (now) powerful Anglo Saxon kingdom of Northumbria c.630AD. It is From the Anglo Saxons that Little Clifton gained its name. The suffix 'ton' in Little Clifton is Anglo Saxon or 'old English' for enclosure, estate or homestead.

== Mining ==
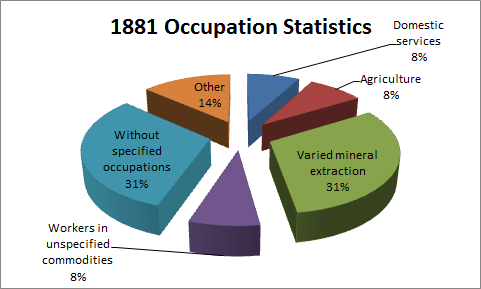
1881 Occupation statistics for Little Clifton

Mining in Cumbria plays a large role in its history. Lead, copper, zinc, barite, haematite, tungsten, graphite, fluorite, and coal have all been mined at different times since as early as the 12th century. Western parts of Cumbria, and in particular the Whitehaven area, proved to contain haematite in large shallow deposits which were exploited by early miners. The first documented mining in the Cumbrian area was in Bigrigg mine roughly 15 miles south of Little Clifton in the parish of Egremont. It is believed that Romans mined this area and later on by early British and Norse settlers. In 1881 31% of the inhabitants of Little Clifton were involved in mineral extraction, the highest single occupation in the parish at that time. Force Crag mine in Keswick was the closest mine to Little Clifton which was mined for lead, zinc and barytes from 1839 to its closure in 1991. Force Crag mine is now run by the National Trust and open to the public.

== St Luke's Church ==
(OSGB36: NY 054 290 [100m precision] WGS84: 54:38.8700N 3:28.0354W)

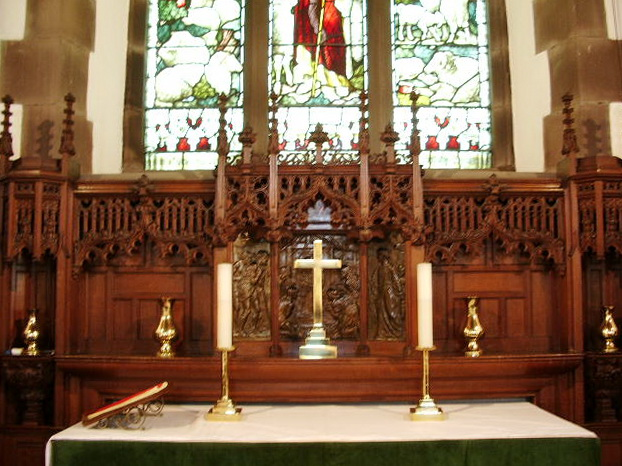
View of the altar within St Luke's church

The site of St Luke's Church dates back to Norman times and has various Norman artefacts such as a Norman archway and Norman cross shaft in the graveyard. The current church dates back to 1901 and contains some superb stained glass windows and other furnishings donated by local families. The church regularly holds concerts, events and open days.

== Punderland Farm ==
Punderland farm featured on the BBC, amongst other British news mediums, due to a 'tragic mistake' which caused the unnecessary slaughter of 200 ewes, 300 lambs and a pet pig. The mishap occurred because of a grid reference error of one digit during the foot and mouth outbreak in 2001. The intended farm for destruction was in Durham 100 miles (161 km) away. No more compensation was granted than the standard for loss of livestock at the time and no legal firm would go to court for what would be a costly battle.

The farm and its associated barn are the only listed building in the parish, being designated at Grade II. It is dated 1739, the farmhouse is roughcast with a green slate roof, and has two storeys and three bays, and there is a lower right-angled barn to the right.
