= Cadell =

Cadell or Cadel is an old Welsh personal name derived from the Latin Catullus. As a surname, it derives from the Welsh patronymic "ap Cadell". Notable people with the name include:

== Given name ==
=== Middle Ages ===
- Cadell Ddyrnllwg, King of Powys c.447–460, founder of royal house of Powys
- Cadell ap Brochfael, King of Powys 773–808)
- Cadell ap Gruffydd, Prince of Deheubarth 1143–1153
- Cadell ap Rhodri, Prince of Seisyllwg 854–909

=== Modern era ===
- Cadel Evans (born 1977), Australian cyclist

== Surname ==
- Alan Cadell (1841–1921), British administrator in India
- Alexander Cadell (1900–1928), English cricketer
- Arnau Cadell (12th–13th century), Catalan sculptor
- Ava Cadell (born 1956), American actress
- Cyngen ap Cadell (c. 790 – 855), Welsh king
- Elizabeth Cadell (1903–1989), British novelist
- Florence St John Cadell (1877–1966), British artist
- Francis Cadell (explorer) (1822–1879), Scottish-born explorer of Australia
- Francis Cadell (artist) (1883–1937), Scottish painter
- Grace Cadell (1855–1918), one of the first female surgeons, Scottish suffragette
- Henry Cadell (1860–1934), Scottish geologist
- Hywel ap Cadell (c. 880 – 948), Welsh king
- James John Cadell (1843–1919), Australian politician
- Jean Cadell (1884–1967), Scottish actress
- Jessie Cadell (1844–1884), English novelist
- Meryn Cadell, Canadian writer and singer
- Nest ferch Cadell, daughter of Cadell ap Brochfael
- Paddy Cadell (born 1999), Irish hurler
- Richard Cadell (born 1969), British magician and puppeteer
- Robert Cadell (1788–1849), Scottish bookseller
- Ross Cadell (born 1969), Australian politician
- Selina Cadell (born 1953), British actress
- Simon Cadell (1950–1996), British actor
- Thomas Cadell the elder (1742–1802), English bookseller and publisher
- Thomas Cadell (politician) (1831–1896), Australian politician
- Thomas Cadell (VC) (1835–1919), Scottish recipient of the Victoria Cross
- William Archibald Cadell (1775–1855), Scottish industrialist and mathematician
- William Cadell (1708–1777), Scottish industrialist

== Places ==
- Cadell, South Australia, named after Francis Cadell
- Cadell and Blyth Floodplains, Northern Territory, Australia
- Cadell Training Centre, prison in Cadell, South Australia
- Cadell Fault, a geological feature of Southern New South Wales and northern Victoria, Australia

== See also ==
- Caddel
- Caddell
