= William Archibald Cadell =

Scottish industrialist and mathematician (1775–1855)

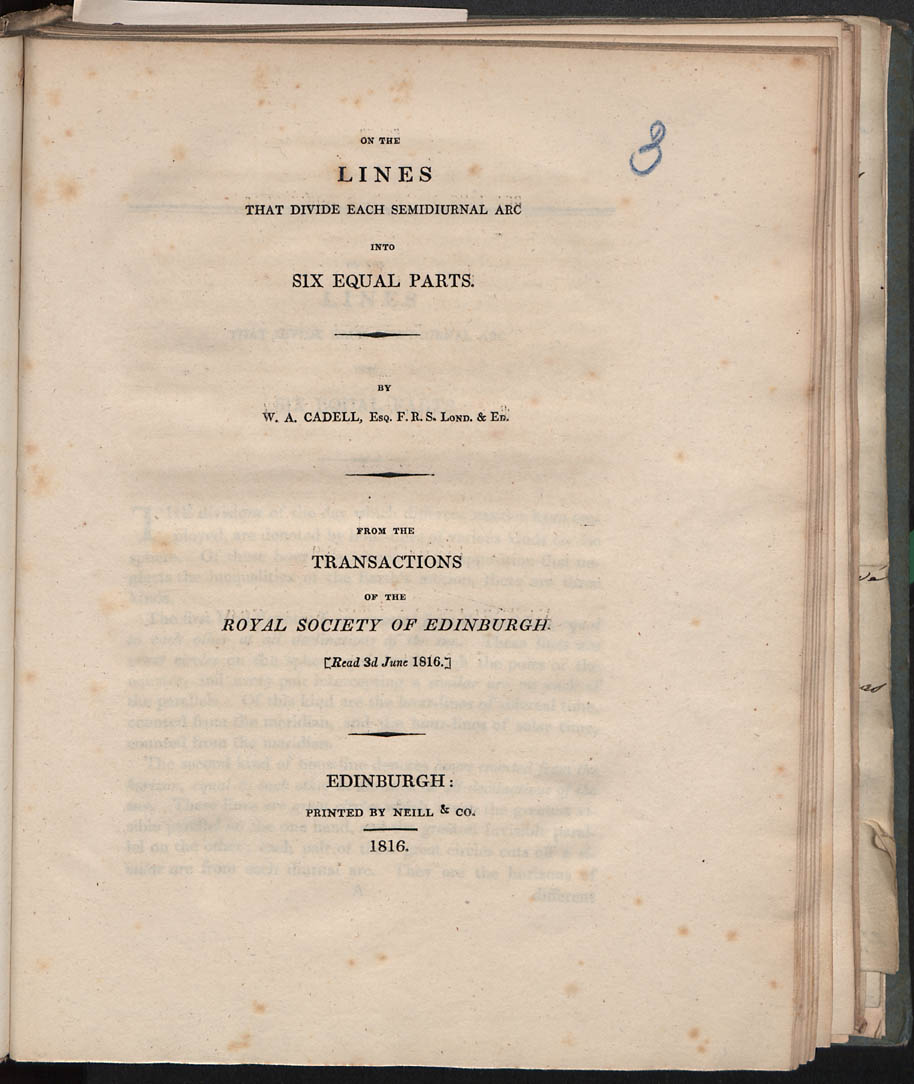
On the lines that divide each semidiurnal arc into six equal parts, 1816

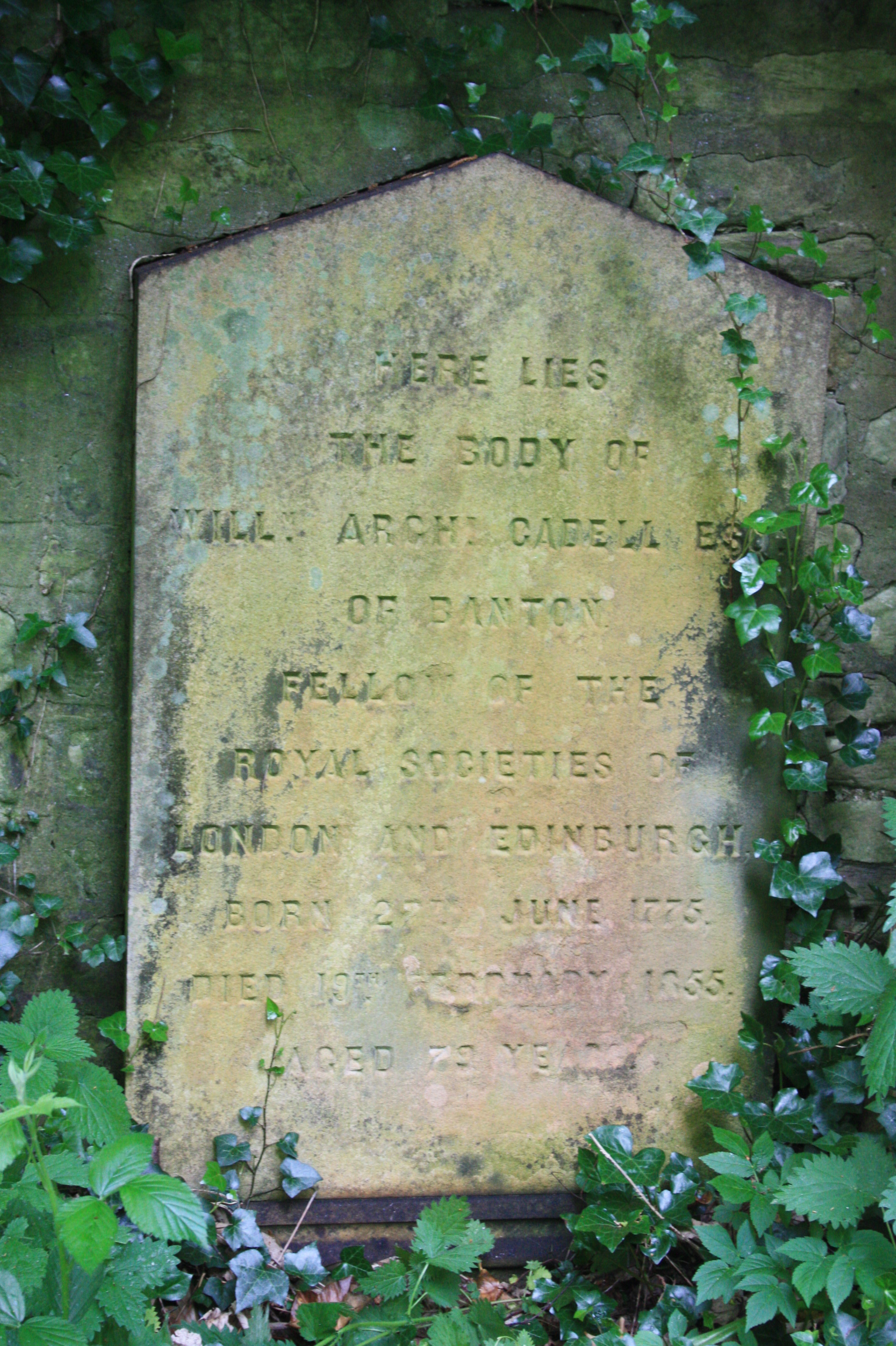
The grave of William Archibald Cadell, Warriston Cemetery

William Archibald Cadell FRS FRSE FGS MWS (1775–1855) was a Scottish industrialist and mathematician, also known as a travel writer.

== Life ==
The eldest son of William Cadell the younger, son of William Cadell, the original managing partner and one of the founders of the Carron Iron Works, by his wife Katherine, daughter of Archibald Inglis of Auchendinny in Midlothian, he was born at his father's residence, Carron Park, near Falkirk, on 27 June 1775.

From 1787 he owned shares in an iron syndicate, transferred from his ironmaster uncle Thomas Edington, but at this point he was a nominee for his father. After studying at Edinburgh University, he became, about 1798, a member of the Scottish bar. He did not practise the law, however, having private means and the estate of Banton in Stirlingshire. He was involved in businesses, in the coal and paper sectors as well as iron, but only as a financier.

He trained as an advocate at Edinburgh University, qualifying in 1798, but never practiced, relying instead on his inheritances.

Cadell spent his time in scientific and antiquarian research at home and abroad. While travelling on the European continent during the Napoleonic Wars, he was taken prisoner in 1802, and held captive for some years. On escaping he pretended to be a Frenchman on the basis of his knowledge of French. He was back in Scotland in 1809.

A friend of Sir Joseph Banks, Cadell was elected a fellow of the Royal Society on 28 June 1810. He was also a fellow of the Geological Society, a member of the Wernerian Natural History Society, and a fellow of the Royal Society of Edinburgh.

Cadell died unmarried at Edinburgh on 19 February 1866.

He is buried in Warriston Cemetery. The grave was re-exposed during works by the Friends of Warriston Cemetery in 2017 and lies against the southern wall of the main cemetery, backing onto the Water of Leith Walkway.

== Works ==
In the Transactions of the Royal Society of Edinburgh Cadell published a paper "On the Lines that divide each Semidiurnal Arc into Six Equal Parts"; in the Annals of Philosophy he wrote an "Account of an Arithmetical Machine lately discovered in the College Library of Edinburgh". He wrote up some travels in A Journey in Carniola, Italy, and France in the years 1817, 1818, 2 vols. Edinburgh, 1820.

== Family ==
He never married and had no children.

He was the great-uncle of the geologist Henry Cadell.

== Notes ==
Attribution

This article incorporates text from a publication now in the public domain: Stephen, Leslie, ed. (1886). "Cadell, William Archibald". Dictionary of National Biography. Vol. 8. London: Smith, Elder & Co.
