= Abbotshaugh Community Woodland =

Woodland in Falkirk, Scotland

Coordinates: 56°01′22″N 3°46′19″W

The historic site of Abbotshaugh Community Woodland, located on the south bank of the River Carron, has witnessed many changes over the past 500 years. The recently planted woodland hopes to recreate a naturally regenerating mature woodland within an area consisting of a mosaic of planted woodland, remnant hedgerows, grassland and saltmarsh. The woodland provides a year-round home for many species including Roe deer, foxes, buzzards and kestrels.

== History ==
=== 16th and 17th Century (Cartography, Timothy Pont, Joan Blaeu) ===
The original course of the River Carron can be viewed as a digital image on the National Library of Scotland website. M.S.32, the particular survey of interest is one of many by Timothy Pont who completed a universal survey of Scotland on foot between 1583 and 1614. The work was never published in his lifetime, after Pont's death in 1614 James VI planned to purchase the materials however due to the turbulence of the times they lay forgotten. Sir John Scot, Lord Scotstarvit enlisted Robert Gordon of Straloch and his son James Gordon. In 1641 the surviving manuscripts were carried to Amsterdam, there they revised Pont's maps with the aid of Joan Blaeu. Whilst in Amsterdam in 1645, Sir John Scot dictated from memory the description of several districts, this was accompanied by a Royal letter from Charles I. The works were finally published in the Geographiæ Blaeuaniæ volumen quintum by Joan Blaeu in 1654. Pont's M.S.32 shows the river north of Falkirk, the lands of Abbotshaugh south of the River Carron are marked as "A "east of N. Daldarfe, Joan Blaeu's edition of Stirlingshire shows much the same except for the addition of trees, between the two trees N/E of N. Daldarfe, again the letter "A" can be found, representing Abbotshaugh. This is not clear on the digital images but can be seen on the reproduction maps published jointly by Collins Bartholomew and the Royal Scottish Geographical Society who own one of the original Blaeu's edition of Stirlingshire.

=== 18th Century (Carron Iron Works, Charles Gascoigne, John Ogilvie) ===
The River Carron of today is man-made and since the destruction of Arthur's O'On has seen many changes, when Carron Iron works was established, they used the river to power their mills and to transport the raw materials and finished products. Charles Gascoigne played a prominent part in the makeup of the river, and the woodlands surrounding the area, he was married to Mary, daughter of Samuel Garbett, a founding partner of Carron Iron Works in 1759. Gascoigne became a partner in Carron Iron Works in 1765, presumably because the Board of Ordinance granted the works a contract to supply armaments to the British Armed Forces in 1764 and he acqustraited the building of parts for James Watt's steam engine in 1765. By this time the Carron Iron Works had come to be at the forefront of the Industrial Revolution, later, boasting the largest Iron works in Europe. In reward, The Carron House was built for him ca. 1759 - 1773 by Francis/Samuel Garbett and Co. He became manager of the Carron Iron Works in 1769 and thus set out to improve the quality of the end product, in 1773 the Carron Iron Works were awarded a Royal Charter however the quality of the pig iron and cast iron had deteriorated to the point where in the same year, 1773, the Royal Navy contracts were cancelled. Thanks to Charles Gascoigne much of the landscape wehe has changed has remained unchanged to this day, as well as straightening the river, lands on both sides of the river were improved and as a consequence brought greater profit to the lairds of the day.

=== 20th and 21st Century (Local Planning, Planting, Correct Naming, The Helix Project) ===
The first community planting was the result of an advert in The Falkirk Herald. The area planted in March 1996 was the site of Dalderse Mill Farm which was the last working farm in the Dawson ward of Falkirk. The second area planted in March 1998 was Farm Road Community Woodland which incorporated memorial plantings. The third area planted was Cobblebrae Community Woodland in March 2000. All sites were planted as a native mixed woodland.

By 2001 there was some confusion regarding the areas that were planted and so a community group from the Dawson Ward of Falkirk called the Abbotshaugh Alliance was formed to represent the community interest. The name Abbotshaugh was chosen because it is an historically correct name for the land where all the planting took place. The Abbotshaugh Alliance (AA) was then amalgamated into the Abbotshaugh Community Woodlands Group (ACWG).

Abbotshaugh Alliance had an open day for local residents to show support for the local community woodland and at the same time it allowed them to bring up any concerns. A report was written up following the feedback from the day.

From 2004 The Abbotshaugh Community Woodlands Group pushed forward with funding for the local area, garnering interest from around the country The Abbotshaugh Sentinel project. The artist Jephson Robb who was commissioned to design the Sentinel Project took part in a discussion with local residents of the area at Callendar House on 25 April 2012. All of the work carried out by various community groups and organisations throughout the years have led to the vast support and go ahead in the local area for The Helix Project which is situated at the end of the Forth and Clyde Canal. Incorporated into Helix Falkirk is the Helix Cycle Path The Helix Around Town Tour is a 16-mile circular cycle route starting at Falkirk Stadium and connecting The Helix, The Falkirk Wheel and Callendar Park. It has several sections in the Abbotshaugh Community Woodlands.
