= Charles Gascoigne =

British industrialist (1737–1806)

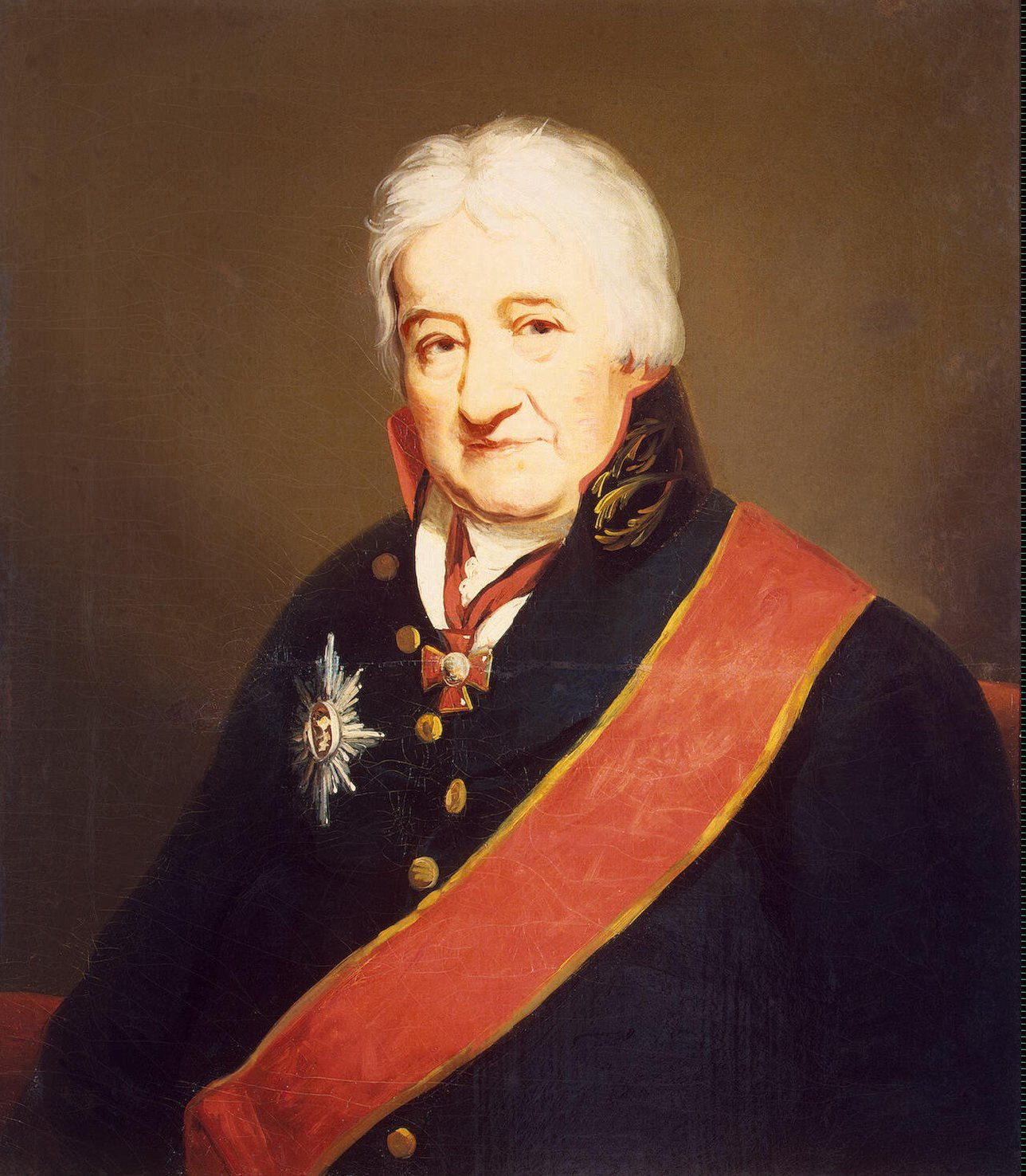
- Born: 1737
- Died: 1 August 1806 (aged 68–69)
- Occupation: Businessman
- Parent(s): Captain Woodroffe Gascoigne; Grizel Elphinstone
- Relatives: Charles Elphinstone, 9th Lord Elphinstone (maternal grandfather)

Charles Gascoigne (1737–1806) was a British industrialist at the beginning of the Industrial Revolution. Gascoigne was an architect, mechanic, inventor, businessman and industrialist. He spent the final twenty years of his life in the Russian Empire, gaining fame as an engineer-inventor, entrepreneur, and specialist in production.

Gascoigne is regarded as the founder of the industrial city of Luhansk in eastern Ukraine, in 1795.

== Early life ==
Charles Gascoigne was born in 1737 in Great Britain. His father was Captain Woodroffe Gascoigne, who was deployed in Scotland after the Battle of Culloden in 1746. His mother was Grizel, eldest daughter of Charles Elphinstone, 9th Lord Elphinstone and his wife Elizabeth Primrose.

== Career ==
Gascoigne worked for the British East India Company and as a partner in Coney and Gascoigne, a firm of drysalters in London. He married Mary, the daughter of Samuel Garbett, at St Martin's, Birmingham, in 1759. Garbett was a founding partner in the Carron Company, also founded in 1759, and Gascoigne become a partner in the ironworks in 1765, having been manager of Garbett's nearby turpentine factory, Garbett & Co., since 1763.

=== Carron Company ===
When Gascoigne joined the Carron Company only six years after it was founded, it was still suffering from problems with the quality of its iron. Notwithstanding this, the Board of Ordnance had granted it a lucrative contract to supply armaments to the British armed forces in 1764. He became managing partner of the ironworks in 1769, taking over from William Cadell, Jr, the son of William Cadell, another founder of the works.

Gascoigne introduced many improvements in the company's techniques of production, and devoted considerable effort to increasing the quality of its work. However, the Carron Company and Garbett's other enterprises remained in a difficult financial position. Garbett & Co. collapsed under the weight of debts in 1772, harming Gascoigne's relationship with his father-in law. The Board of Ordnance eventually withdrew their contract with Carron Company for long guns in 1773, as a result of concerns over the poor quality of their workmanship

The company received a royal charter to incorporate as the Carron Company in 1773. However, despite his efforts, the quality of company's products had remained low. After the company's contracts to supply the Royal Navy were cancelled in 1773, the company's cannon were removed from all naval vessels.

=== Carronades ===
Undeterred, he also pushed forward the development of a new type of cannon, originally known as the "Gasconade" or "Melvillade", but better known by its later name, the "Carronade". The carronade was designed as a short-range naval weapon with a low muzzle velocity, and is said to have been invented by Lieutenant General Robert Melville in 1759. It was developed by Gascoigne from 1769 to 1779. It was adopted by the Royal Navy in 1779.

Easily identified by its considerably shortened barrel, the carronade had the same calibre as a long gun, but contained much less metal and so was much lighter, enabling naval vessels to carry many more carronades than long guns. The resulting short range was not a problem as a result of the close-to broadside tactics employed at the time. The new weapon was a considerable success (earning the nickname "The Smasher" by Royal Navy crews) and remained in production from 1778 through to the 1850s. In addition to the Royal Navy, the company also supplied armaments to governments outside the UK, including weapons supplied to the United States which were used against Britain in the War of 1812.

=== Russia ===
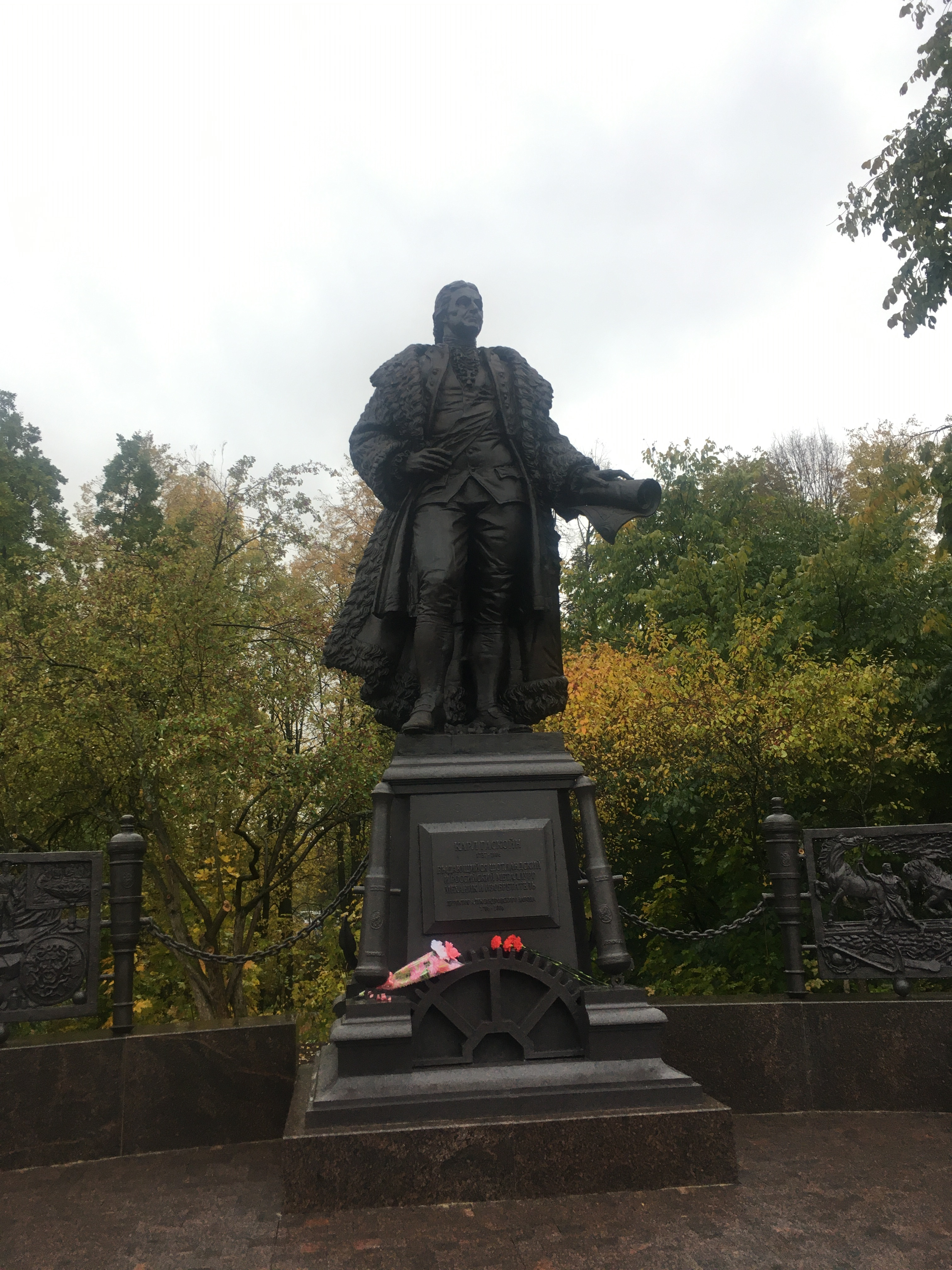
A bust of "Karl Gaskoin" in Petrozavodsk, Russia

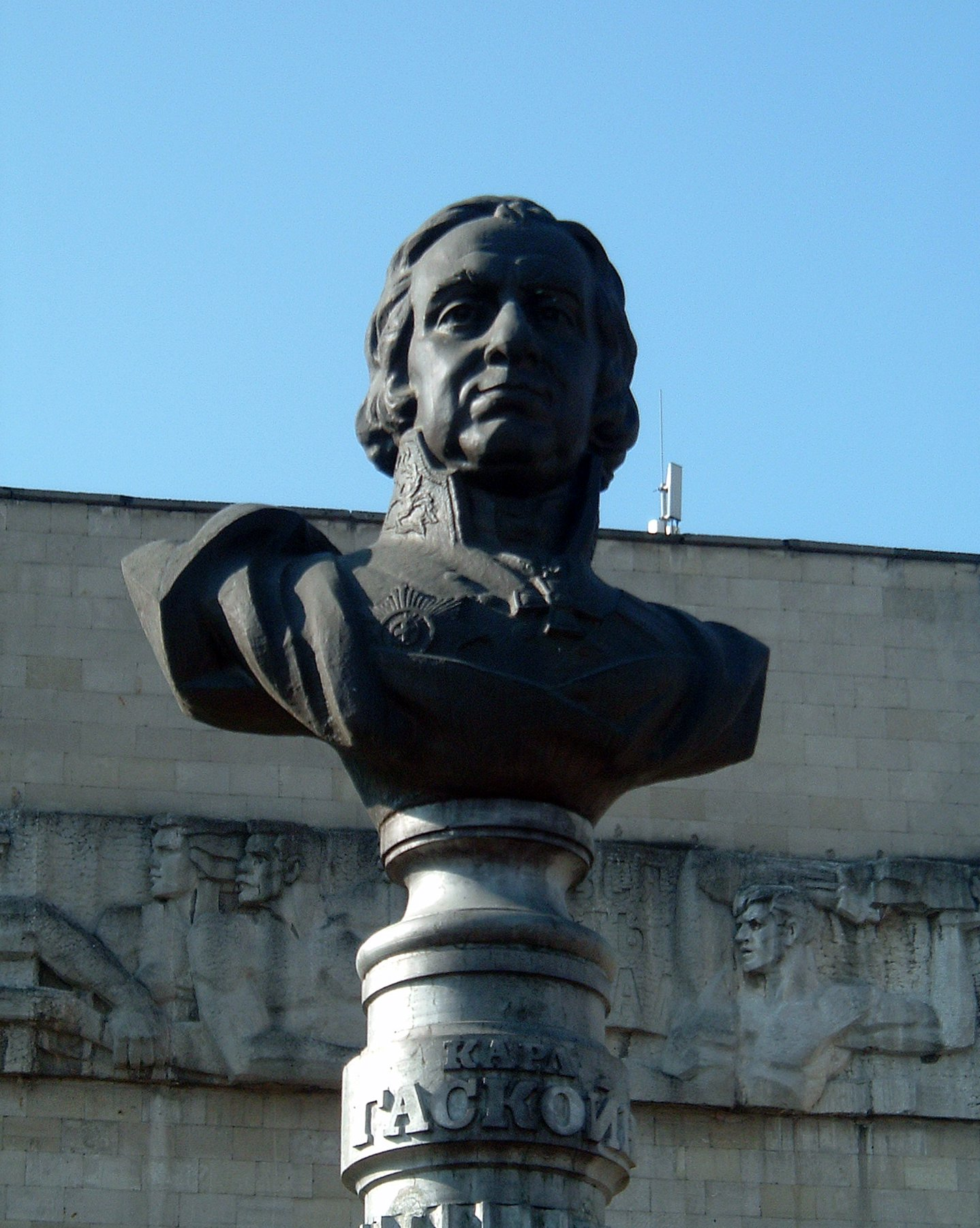
A bust of "Karl Gaskoin" in Luhansk, Ukraine, a city of which he is considered to be the founder, having established an iron foundry there in 1795.

In the 1770s and 1780s, the British government had been involved in a programme to render military assistance to the Russian Empire. A steam engine, designed by John Smeaton and manufactured by the Carron Company, was ordered by Charles Knowles (then working for the Russians) and was sent to Russia in 1774, together with a supply of coal and Carron workmen.

In 1784, Knowles' successor, Admiral Samuel Greig, ordered guns for the Russian Navy from the Carron Company. In an effort to improve Catherine the Great's weapons foundry at Petrozavodsk, the Russians also ordered a large quantity of plant and equipment. The British government tried to prevent the company from supplying this cutting-edge military technology; nonetheless, Gascoigne delivered the Russians' orders. Then, in May 1786, he travelled to Kronstadt to supervise the installation works at the Aleksandrovsky foundry, accompanied by workers from the Carron Company. He was also accompanied by Charles Baird, Adam Armstrong, and Alexander Wilson. Gascoigne was in financial trouble at the time, having been declared bankrupt.

Gascoigne was to remain in Russia for twenty years, where he became known as Karl Karlovich Gaskoin (Карл Гаскойн). He became a State Councillor and a Knight of Saint Vladimir, received the Order of St Anne, 1st and 2nd classes, received the rank of Councillor of State, and was head of all mines and foundries in Karelia, including the mines at Petrozavodsk (Olonets Province, Russia). He improved many existing Russian iron foundries and built new ones, and also advancing the Russian's cannon-manufacturing techniques. He established the first machine presses at the Saint Petersburg Mint, although the project was ultimately completed by Matthew Boulton.

== Personal life ==
He had three daughters by his first wife: Anne, who married Thomas Hamilton, 7th Earl of Haddington, in 1786; Elizabeth, who married an MP, George Augustus Pollen; and Maria, who married Alexander Markovich Poltoratsky.

He married his second wife, Anastasia Jessie Guthrie (1782-1855), daughter of Dr. Matthew Guthrie, in 1797, when she was only 15, and he was 59.

== Death ==
He died in July 1806 in Kolpino near St. Petersburg, and was buried in Petrozavodsk.

== See also ==
- Abbotshaugh Community Woodland
- Matthew Boulton, English businessman and inventor
- John Hughes, Welsh businessman, founder of city of Donetsk
