= Thomas Edington =

Thomas Edington FRSE FGS MWS (1814–1859) was a Scottish foundry owner and important amateur geologist and mineralogist. He was proprietor of Thomas Edington & Son.

== Life ==
He was born in Glasgow the eldest son of Thomas Edington of Glasgow (1783-1841) also a keen mineralogist and member of the Geological Society of London, after whom Edingtonite is named. He published the obituary of his father in 1841 and speculated as to the fate of his large mineral collection. His mother was Anne Storey Grey. He had six siblings.

Edington’s grandfather Thomas Edington (1742-1811) was founder of Thomas Edington and Sons (also known as the Phoenix Foundry or Phoenix Works) in Glasgow. Edington senior had originally worked under William Cadell at Cramond Iron Works and had married Cadell’s daughter, Christian Cadell, later co-founding the Clyde Ironworks with him. Thomas Edington & Sons began in 1797 at 52 Queen Street in Glasgow and by 1804 was a major industry, specialising in ornamental cast-iron work. It also cast cannon, including many used in the Crimean War. It later moved to Garscube Road. Thomas the younger probably began managerial roles in the foundry from 1831/32. From the 1840s they began making railway engines for the Glasgow, Paisley, Kilmarnock and Ayr Railway.

In 1835 he was elected a Fellow of the Royal Society of Edinburgh his proposer being a cousin, William Archibald Cadell, also involved in the iron foundry business. In later life he served as a Manager of Anderson’s College in Glasgow. At this time he lived at 15 Newton Place, then a new terraced house, still surviving, just north of Sauchiehall Street.

Thomas died at the Royal Asylum in Perth on 26 July 1859. The firm had been taken over in 1857 by its sole remaining partner, David Low, who had joined in 1844, but continued under its previous name.

The site of the Phoenix Foundry became the Phoenix Park in 1891. The company itself survived until 1903.

== Notable works ==
- The entrance gates to the Jewish Burial Ground at the foot of the Glasgow Necropolis (1832) - lost
- The entrance gates to the Glasgow Necropolis (1838)

== Family ==
Thomas’ uncle James Edington was involved in the running and management of the Eagle Foundry at Port Dundas.

Thomas’ great nephew was the geologist Henry Cadell.
