= Henry Cadell =

Scottish geologist and geographer (1860-1934)

Henry Moubray Cadell
- Citizenship: Scottish
- Occupation: Geologist

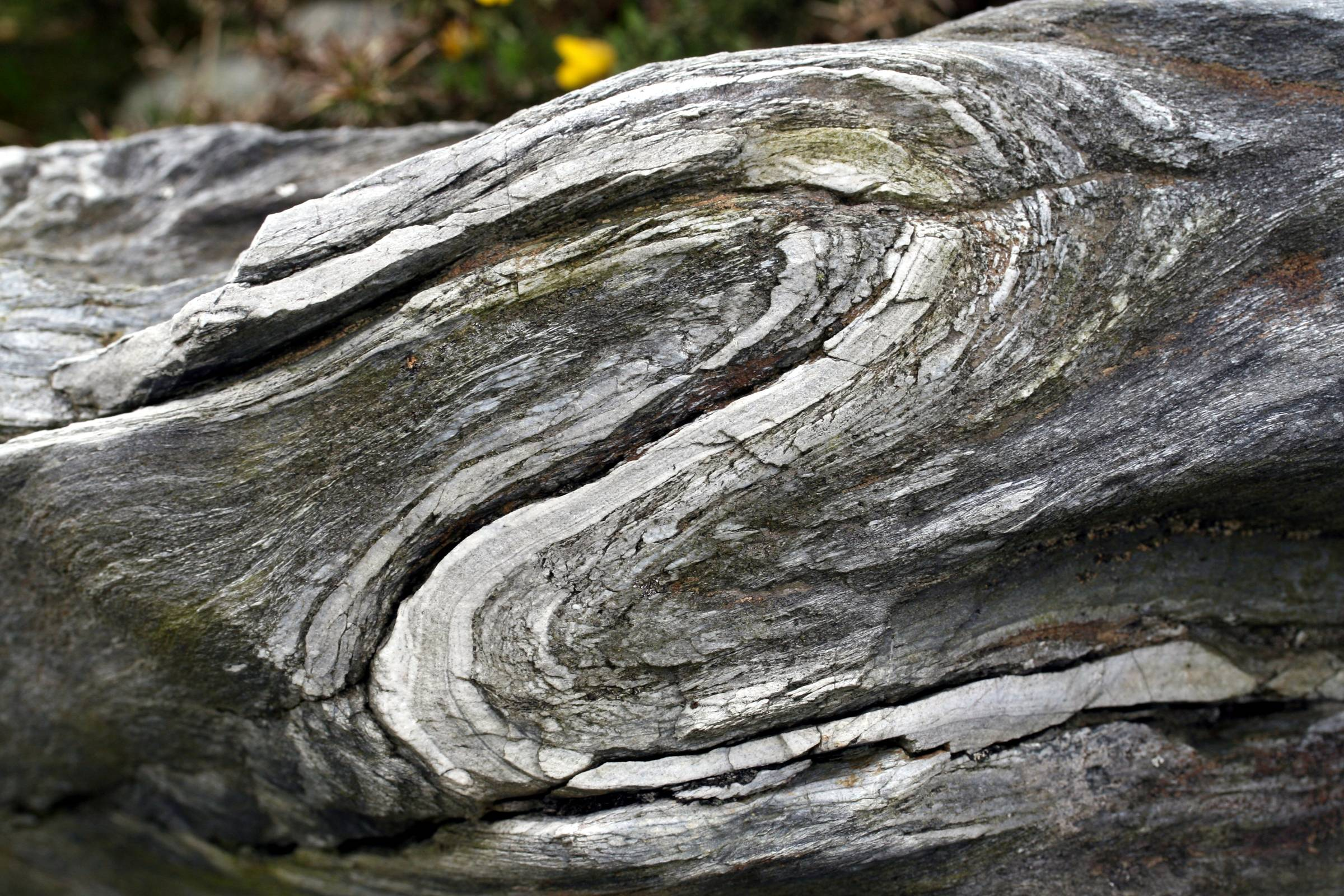
Folds in rock as investigated by Cadell

Henry Moubray Cadell of Grange, DL FRSE LLD (1860 – 10 April 1934) was a Scottish geologist and geographer, noted for his work on the Moine Thrust, the oil-shale fields of West Lothian, and his experiments in mountain building published in 1888. He also travelled extensively abroad, for example in 1899 he travelled the length of the Irrawaddy River in Burma. He is especially remembered for his working models, explaining geomorphology, the science relating to the folding of rock beds. He was also a competent amateur artist. .

== Life ==
He was born in Scotland in 1860. He was the eldest of seven children to Henry Cadell of Grange by his second wife, Jessie Gray MacFarlane. His father was a mining industrialist with considerable lands and company interests in Linlithgowshire and Stirlingshire. He was raised at the family home of Grange House (built 1564) near Bo'ness.

He was educated at the University of Edinburgh (studying geology under Archibald Geikie from 1878 to 1881) and then spent a further year studying at the Clausthal Royal Mining Academy in Germany, before entering the employment of the Geological Survey of Scotland. He worked with the Survey from 1883 to 1888, largely surveying in the Scottish Highlands, then abandoned this to instead manage his family's estates (which included several large collieries), following the death of his father in January 1888.

His work with the Survey included geological investigations around Loch Eriboll in north-west Sutherland. This investigation was partly aimed to resolve a geological quandary raised by Charles Lapworth, which puzzled over the inter-relationship between metamorphosed Moine rocks and non-metamorphosed Cambrian rocks beneath. This led Cadell to speculate that the rocks had been folded over on themselves. He conducted many experiments to support his theories (which are now proven to be fully correct).

Under the overall control of Archibald Geikie, Cadell was sent to survey 20 square miles with Benjamin Peach, making detailed maps in Sutherland. He worked here for three summers: 1884, 1885 and 1886. Winters were spent collecting borehole and quarry information in the Lothians. This was tangentially aimed at increasing knowledge of coal and oil-shale seams in relation to his family businesses. In 1906 this led to publication of a major map of the Oil Shales of Lothian.

From 1885 he began modelling experiments to explain the things found in the field. This led to an illustrated lecture, given to the Royal Society of Edinburgh in February 1888, visualising his theories.

In 1904 he hired Hippolyte Blanc to design a new Grange House but this did not come to fruition, and ultimately Alexander Lorne Campbell designed the new house, completed in 1906.

He was a leading figure in the Royal Scottish Geographical Society, first as chairman of its council (1919-1924), then president (1927-1928).

He was elected a Fellow of the Royal Society of Edinburgh in 1887. His proposers were fellow geologist James Geikie, George Chrystal and Ramsay Heatley Traquair.

The University of Edinburgh awarded him an honorary Doctorate (LLD) in 1932.

He died suddenly on 10 April 1934.

== Family ==
He was a great, great grandson of the pioneering industrialist William Cadell, co-founder of the Carron Iron Works. He was the grand nephew of William Archibald Cadell FRSE (1775-1855).

He married Elinor Simson MBE (1868-1943) in 1889. They had seven daughters and one son.

His great uncle was the mineralogist Thomas Edington FRSE.

== Noteworthy foreign trips and surveys ==
- Norway (1889)
- United States (1891)
- Switzerland (1894)
- Australia and New Zealand (1895–96) (gold mines)
- Russia: Caucasus, Volga and Black Sea (1897)
- India and Burma (1899) (coal seams)
- Egypt (1902–03)
- Mexico (1906)
- Bavaria (1909) (investigating salt mines)
- Canada and Alaska (1913) (Yukon gold mines)
- English coalfields (1915)
- Spitzbergen (1920–21) (coal seams)

== Publications ==
- The Geology and Scenery of Sutherland (1896)
- The Story of the Forth (1913)
- The Rocks of West Lothian (1925)

== Bibliography ==
- Cadell of Grange, H. M. (1904). "The industrial development of the forth valley". Scottish Geographical Journal. 20 (2): 66–84. doi:10.1080/00369220408733508.
