= Caddel =

Caddel is a surname. Notable people with the surname include:

- Ernie Caddel (1911–1992), American football player
- Richard Caddel (1949–2003), English poet, publisher, and editor

== See also ==
- Caddell
