= The Helix (Falkirk) =

The Helix, Home of the Kelpies
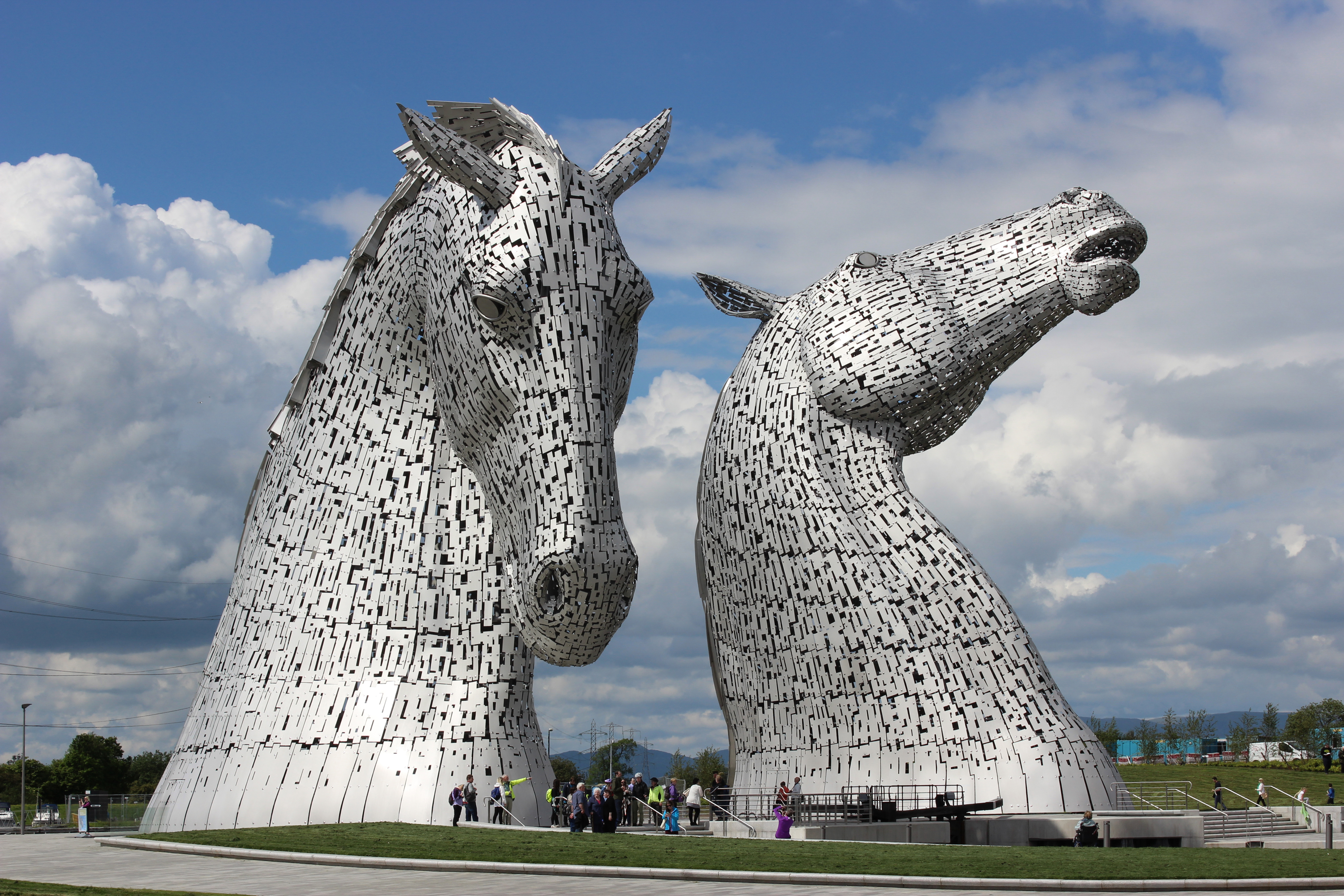
- The Kelpies, which tower over the new canal at The Helix
- Coordinates: 56.018°N 3.755°W
- Official name: The Helix, Home of the Kelpies
- Maintained by: Scottish Canals and Falkirk Council

History
- Construction start: April 2006 (official planning)

Location
- Interactive map of The Helix, Home of the Kelpies

The Helix was a land transformation project to improve the connections between and around 16 communities in Falkirk Council, Scotland, including the eastern end of the Forth and Clyde Canal, and to regenerate the area near where the canal joins the River Carron. The most visible feature of the development is the two unique equine sculptures known as The Kelpies.

== Overview ==
The Forth and Clyde Canal was reopened as part of the Millennium Link project in 2001, and included the Falkirk Wheel, a 100-foot (30-metre) revolving boat lift that connects it to the Union Canal. By 2014, the Falkirk Wheel had become one of Scotland's most popular tourist attractions, second only to Edinburgh Castle among destinations that charge for entry. The canals from there to Glasgow and Edinburgh have also become popular, but the final 4 miles (6 kilometres) of the Forth and Clyde Canal from the Wheel to Grangemouth, descending through a flight of 12 locks and two single locks, was little used. The final part of the route to the original outlet at Grangemouth Docks had been obliterated by the construction of a motorway, a road, housing, and factories. An alternative route was opened; it connected to the River Carron through a sea lock further upstream but it was not ideal, as the river was crossed by two road bridges and two pipe bridges below the entrance lock. This provided limited headroom when the tide was high and insufficient water to enter the lock when it was low; an alternative route was therefore sought.

The opportunity to remedy the situation and to make the eastern end of the canal more accessible to the general public was provided by the Big Lottery Fund Living Landmarks programme. £140 million of funding was on offer, and in 2005 the Helix project was awarded one of the top four prizes, which kick-started the £43 million project. The plans included a new 950-yard (870-metre) section of canal, which would join the river below the four fixed bridges at a new sea lock. A new tunnel under the M9 motorway would be constructed by cut and cover methods, and a lift bridge would be inserted into the A905 road. The plans also included the re-routing of two high-pressure oil pipelines which crossed the area to feed the refinery at Grangemouth.

The project was designed to transform under-used land between Falkirk and Grangemouth into a thriving urban greenspace called "The Helix". This includes a performance area, on which large-scale events can be held, facilities for watersports provided by the construction of a large lagoon, all surrounded by play areas and high quality pathways. The central area is known as Helix Park and the whole development covers some 350 hectares (860 acres). Access around The Helix will be provided by 27 kilometres (17 miles) of cycleways and footpaths.

The name ‘Helix’ comes from the distinctive shape of the project as it spirals down from Langlees to Laurieston and Polmont.

== Funding ==
Falkirk Council led a Big Lottery Living Landmarks bid in partnership with British Waterways (Scotland) and Central Scotland Forest Trust. In 2007 the consortium were successful in their application, which saw 316 entries and 3 winners, with The Helix receiving an award of £25m. This award was the first of its kind in Scotland through the programme, and the largest ever awarded by BIG to individual projects at the time. In March 2009, Falkirk Council approved the creation of the Helix Trust that would be responsible for overseeing the first phase of this project.

Additional funding was received from a number of other sources including the Scottish Government, Sustrans, Score Environmental and Forth Environmental Trust.

A contract worth £13.5 million was awarded to Balfour Beatty in early 2012 for the construction of the new canal. Another £1 million contract for the visitor centre was awarded to Nicholl Russell Studios, a firm of architects based in Dundee.

== The Kelpies ==
The most visible feature of the development is the two unique equine structures known as The Kelpies. Each structure measures around 100 feet (30 metres) in height. The Kelpies were the brainchild of Andy Scott who also created the "Heavy Horse" sculpture at the side of the M8 motorway between Glasgow and Edinburgh. Another inspiration was that Carnera, the UK's largest Clydesdale horse, once resided in Falkirk, hauling wagons of the soft drink Irn-Bru for Robert Barr.

Construction of the 1,600-tonne foundations for the Kelpies began in early 2013. The steel structures for the Kelpies were fabricated at Sherburn-in-Elmet in North Yorkshire by SH Structures; delivery of the main steelwork began in March 2013. Each Kelpie weighs 300 tonnes, and once the structural steel framework was erected, they were clad in 990 uniquely shaped stainless steel plates, with construction completed in October 2013.

The Kelpies hosts a visitor experience, enabling visitors to examine the complex and impressive internal structure of The Kelpies. By December 2012, the channel for the canal link had been excavated, and the first major artwork was erected in the Abbotshaugh Community Woodland in early 2013. The project was expected to be completed by the summer of 2014.

== See also ==
- Falkirk Wheel
