= Mount Victoria signal station =

Shipping relay in New Zealand

Coordinates: 41°17′46″S 174°47′39″E

The Mount Victoria signal station was a signal relay station set up in 1866 on the summit of Mount Victoria in Wellington, New Zealand to relay messages about shipping in Wellington Harbour. The signal station relayed messages from the Beacon Hill station near the harbour entrance, using signal flags and metal discs. In 1877, an old Royal Artillery 24 pounder cannon was installed on Mount Victoria for use as a time-gun, on a site adjacent to the signal relay station. The time gun was operated for only a few years from 1878, but as of 2026 the cannon remains as a landmark on Mount Victoria adjacent to the summit lookout. The signal relay station was operated until 1940 when it was disestablished. The site of the signal station was converted to a lookout area in 1964.

== History ==
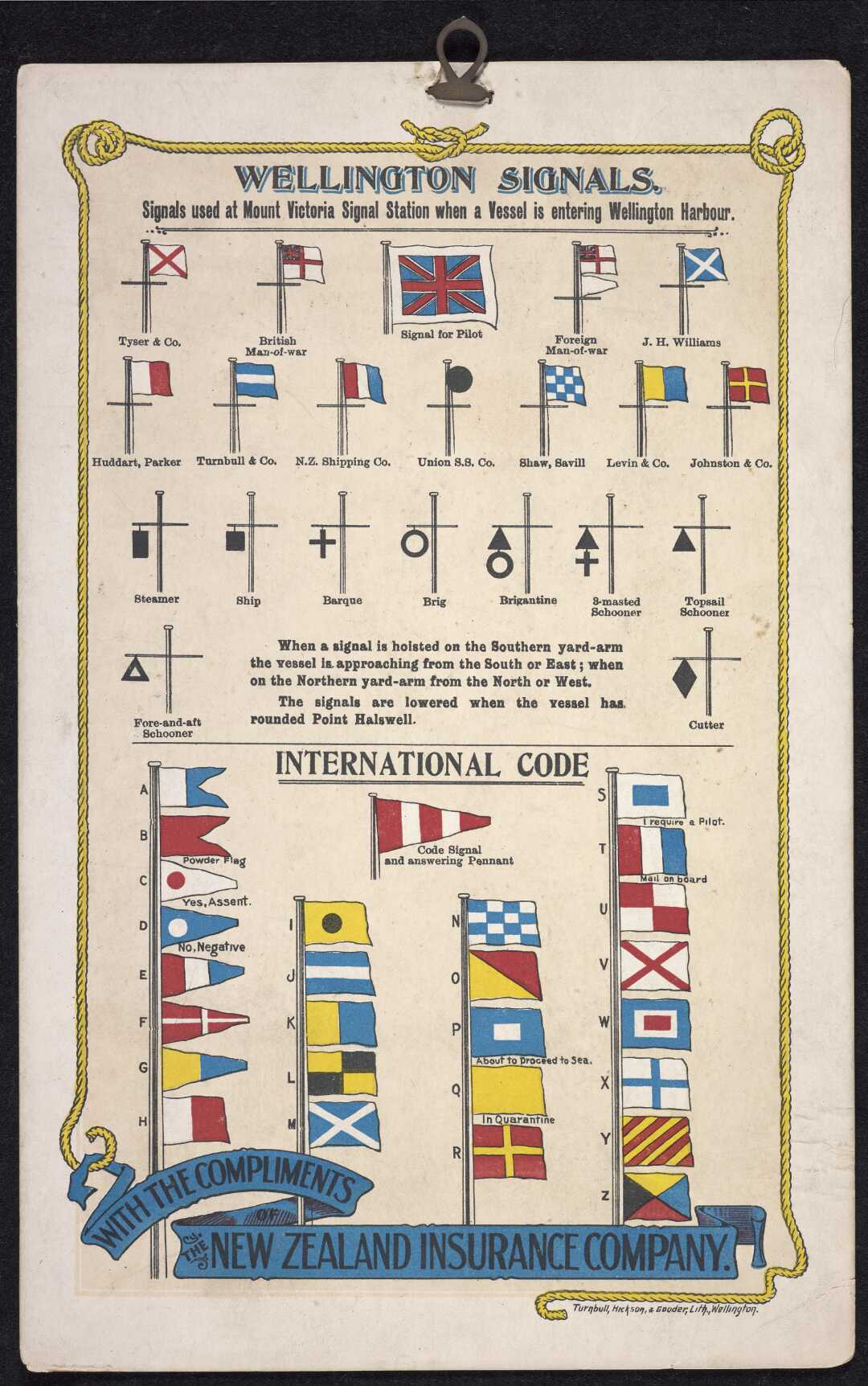
Signals used by the station at Mount Victoria

The first signal station for vessels entering Wellington Harbour was established in 1844 on Mount Albert, a peak to the south of the suburb of Newtown. A replacement signal station was established in 1866 at Beacon Hill, a hilltop in Seatoun overlooking the harbour entrance. The mast and other fittings from Mount Albert were transferred to Mount Victoria to establish a signal relay station that relayed messages about shipping from the Beacon Hill signal station to the city. The Mount Victoria relay station was set up by the Wellington Harbour Master on 2.0 ha (5 acres) of land vested in the Harbour Board.

The relay system worked by means of signal flags and metal discs which conveyed information about shipping entering the harbour. The Beacon Hill signal station would fly flags indicating the information, and the signaller at Mount Victoria would then replicate the signal for the information of people in the city and port of Wellington. This system meant that the signaller at Mount Victoria had to keep a constant watch on the Beacon Hill station. In 1909 the Harbour Board linked the two stations by telephone so that the watch became less irksome.

Improved radio-telephone communications from Beacon Hill led to the signal station becoming redundant and it was disestablished in September 1940. The area previously occupied by the signal station was converted into a lookout area in 1964.

== Personnel and accommodation ==
Mrs Ruth France was appointed as the first keeper of the signal relay station in 1866. In August 1873 Ruth's son Frederick France replaced her as the appointed keeper.

In December 1883 Frederick France tendered his resignation due to ill health. Martin Luman (or Leuman in some sources), the Chief Signalman at Beacon Hill, replaced him for a time. David Smith was signalman at Mount Victoria from early 1889 until his death there in 1890, at which point Luman apparently took over again. At some point between 1866 and 1885 a residence had been built next to the signal station for the keeper as approval was granted to add an extra room to it in 1885. In 1891 a tender was accepted for a new house for the signalman on Mount Victoria. The tender was from T O'Laughlin for £240 13s 11d. Luman, aged 75, was blown over a bank in a "ferocious" wind at the signal station in May 1907 and died seven months later as a result of his injuries. He was replaced by Robert Colville Smith. Smith retired in 1917 and was replaced by William James Lanham, who served at Mount Victoria until his retirement at the end of 1934.

By 1955, the signal keeper's house was derelict. The Wellington Fire Brigade arranged to set fire to the derelict building in August 1957.

== The cannon ==
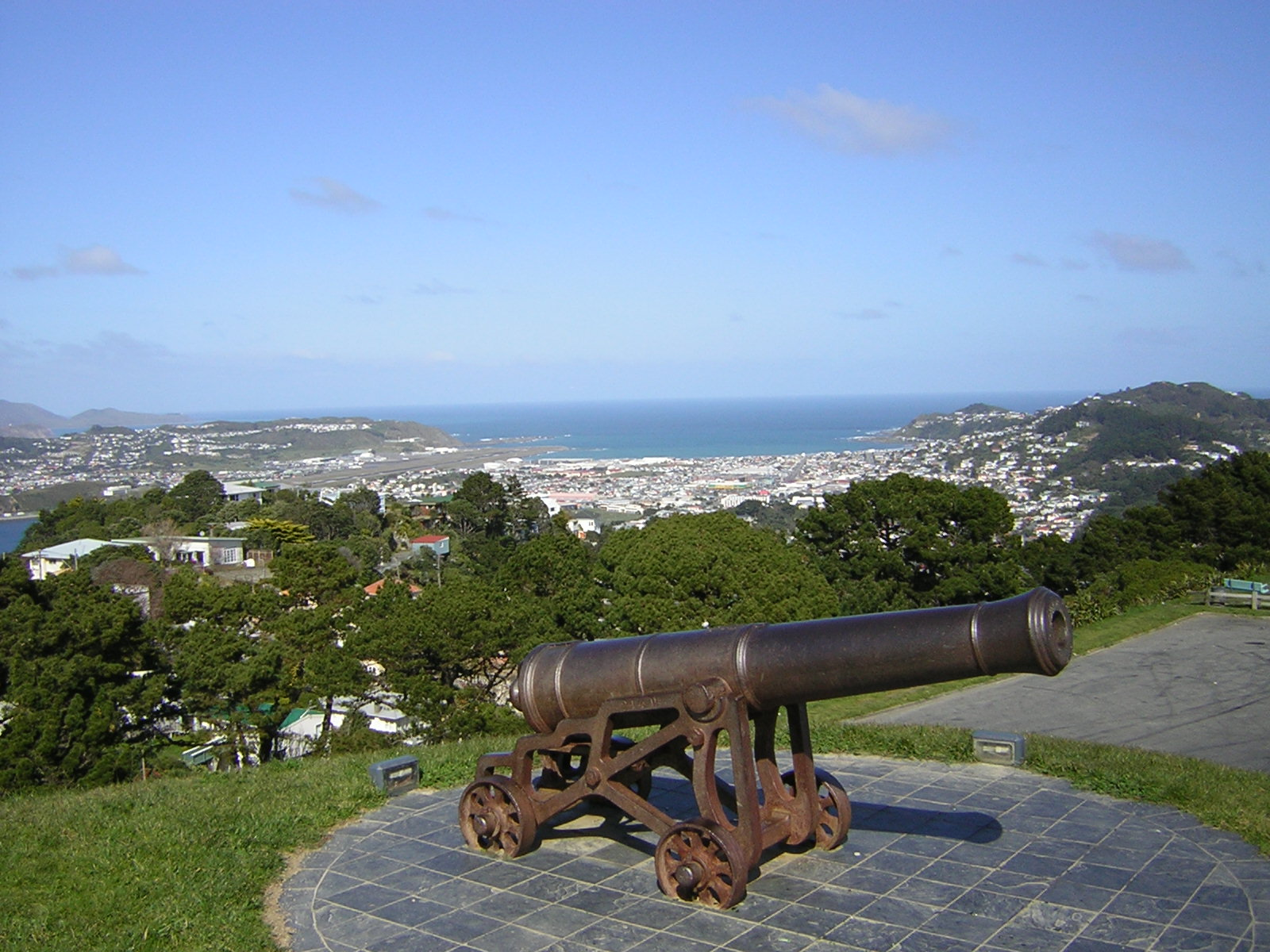
Signal cannon on Mount Victoria

In April 1877 a suggestion was made by the Venerable Archdeacon Stock to place a time gun on Mount Victoria, to be managed by the signal keeper. This was to replace a time-ball on one of the city's wharves as it was no longer widely visible due to the development of the city. The matter was discussed by the Council with it being suggested that the gun and ammunition be supplied by the Council if the Government gave consent. The Customs Department subsequently agreed to ordering the signal keeper to fire the gun, and the City Surveyor was tasked with obtaining the time gun. A gun, an old Royal Artillery 24 pounder from Fort Britomart, was shipped on the Stella to Wellington, arriving in October 1877. The gun is made from cast iron, (Note: The gun is cast iron but some sources incorrectly describe the cannon as being constructed in bronze) and was constructed in Scotland in 1813 at the Carron Iron Works. It had come to New Zealand with artillery associated with either the 90th or 58th Regiments.

The gun was initially taken to the Council depot while the Council tried to find a way to get it to the top of Mount Victoria. A gun of this type was generally 9 foot 6 inches long and weighed 2.5 (imperial) tons. After tenders were called for the task and declined Council decided to ask the Artillery Volunteers to undertake the task. This they agreed to do for the sum of £25, well below the lowest tender of £60. The Volunteers began to move the gun on 24 November, reaching the top of Majoribanks Street that day. The local paper quipped that at this rate of progress it should be in place for the 1900 New Year's celebrations, but the gun was in place by 1 December. A detachment of 18 Volunteers used a block and tackle system to raise the gun up the steep slope from Majoribanks Street to the summit.

The gun's first use as a time gun was on 2 February 1878, although it had been fired on at least three occasions prior, when first placed on Mount Victoria, on New Years Eve, and to celebrate the return of Major Pearce to Wellington. Later in 1878 a wire was run from the telegraph office to the gun so it could be remotely set off. By July 1879 it was reported that the gun, while used on special occasions, was no longer in use as a time gun. Whether this was correct is unknown as in April 1880 the Council had voted to continue its use. By 1888 the gun had fallen into disuse and a local firm J Robinson and Foley approached the Harbour Board to ask if they could use it. Robinson and Foley used the gun to indicate the start of the 1889 new year. The gun fell into disuse from that time. In 1916 that there was a suggestion that the gun be moved next to the statue of Queen Victoria in Kent Terrace, but this was declined. The last firing of the cannon was in December 1967 by the Royal New Zealand Artillery, to celebrate the centenary of the Wellington Artillery.
