= John Roebuck =

English inventor (1718–1794)

- Born: 1718; Sheffield, England
- Died: 17 July 1794
- Resting place: Carriden Churchyard, Bo'ness
- Education: Edinburgh University
- Occupations: Industrialist, inventor, mechanical engineer, physician

John Roebuck of Kinneil FRS FRSE (1718 – 17 July 1794) was an English industrialist, inventor, mechanical engineer, and physician who played an important role in the Industrial Revolution and who is known for developing the industrial-scale manufacture of sulphuric acid.

== Life and work ==
John Roebuck was born in Sheffield, where his father, also John Roebuck, had a prosperous manufacturing business.

After attending Sheffield Grammar School and Dr. Philip Doddridge's academy at Northampton, Roebuck studied medicine at Edinburgh, where he developed a taste for chemistry from the lectures of William Cullen and Joseph Black. He finally graduated M.D. at the University of Leiden in 1742. Roebuck started medical practice at Birmingham, but devoted much of his time to chemistry, especially its practical applications. Among the most important of his early achievements in this field was the introduction, in 1746, of leaden condensing chambers for the manufacture of sulphuric acid. Together with Samuel Garbett, in 1749 he built a factory at Prestonpans, in Scotland, for the production of the acid, and for some years they enjoyed a monopoly. Having neglected to take out patents, Roebuck's was unable to prevent others from making use of his methods as they eventually became known.

Roebuck next became involved in the manufacture of iron, and in 1759 founded the Carron Company ironworks at Carron, Stirlingshire with Garbett and other partners (Ebenezer Roebuck, Thomas Roebuck, William Cadell, William Cadell and Benjamin Roebuck). There he introduced various improvements in methods of production, including the conversion (patented in 1762) of cast iron into malleable iron "by the action of a hollow pit-coal fire" urged by a powerful artificial blast. Ebenezer was killed in 1771 in a "melancholy accident: While viewing the works, a huge piece of iron fell on this gentleman, which killed him on the ſpot". Ebenezer had been a vigorous contributor to the success of the ironworks, and quality declined after his death. Its Royal Navy contracts were cancelled in 1773 and a Royal Artillery inspection in 1774 found that "on the death of [Ebenezer] Roebuck the Carron Guns had through the carelessness of the workmen very much deteriorated, and the firm lost ground."

Roebuck had also leased a colliery at Bo'ness to supply coal to the Carron Works, but in sinking for new seams he encountered such quantities of water that the Newcomen engine used was unable to keep the pit clear. Hearing of James Watt's engine, Roebuck contacted its inventor. This engine also proved inadequate, but Roebuck became a strong believer in its future. In return for a two-thirds share in the invention he assisted Watt in perfecting its details by paying Watt's debts and by providing him with a place to work. The workplace became known as James Watt's Cottage and was built in a secluded area of Kinneil House as Roebuck was worried about industrial espionage.

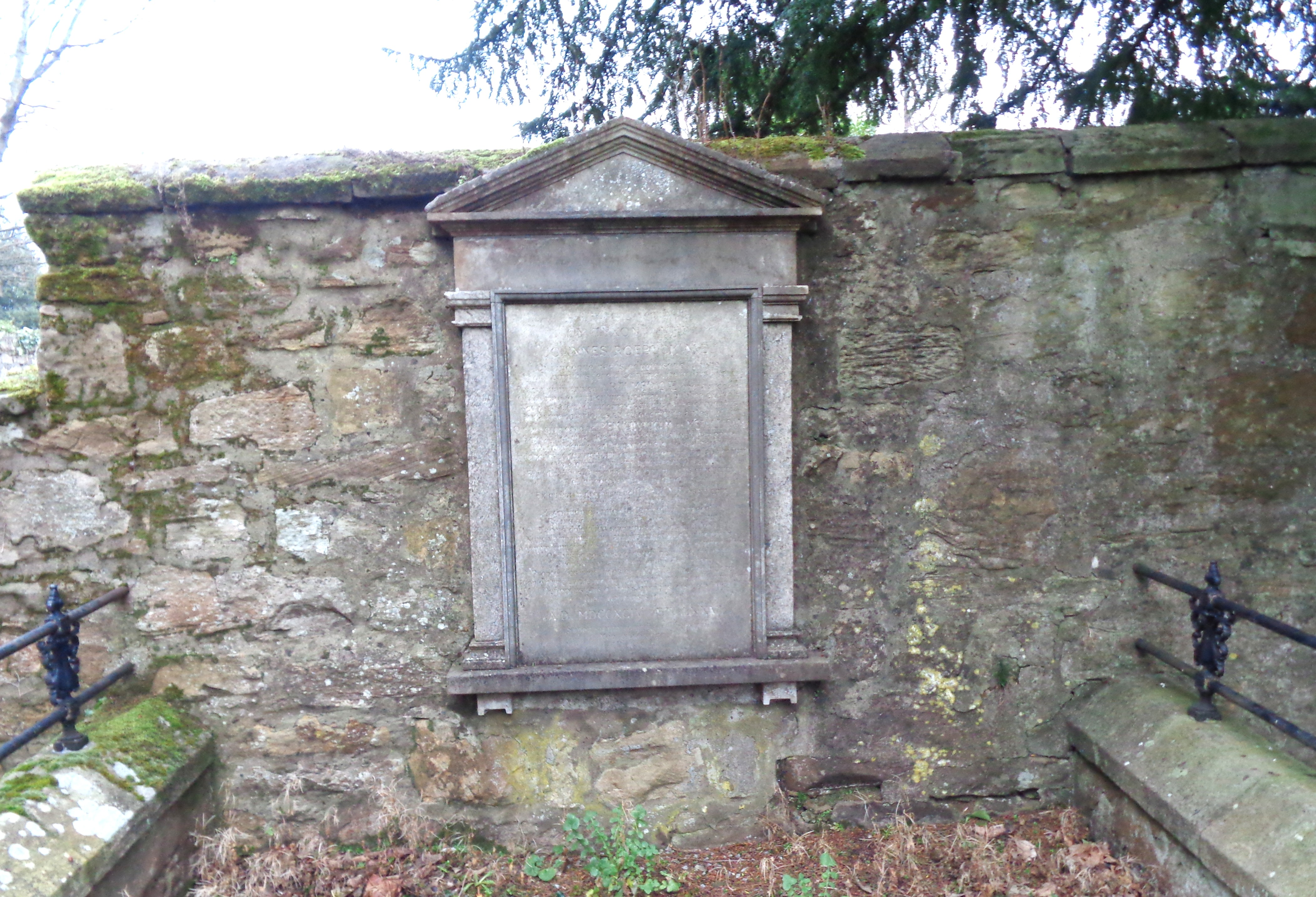
John Roebuck's gravestone at the old Carriden church.

Roebuck's troubles at the Carron Works and the colliery, aggravated by the failure of an attempt to manufacture alkali, brought him into financial difficulties and he was forced to sell his share in Watt's engine to Matthew Boulton in return for cancellation of a £1200 debt. Subsequently, though Roebuck had to give up his interest in the Bo'ness works, he continued to manage them and to reside at the neighbouring Kinneil House, where he occupied himself with farming on a considerable scale.

In 1784, Roebuck obtained a pottery from the Cadell family where he pursued his interest in new technologies.

Roebuck died in Edinburgh in 1794 and was buried at Carriden Churchyard near Bo'ness.

He was grandfather to John Arthur Roebuck.

== Honours and affiliations ==
- 1764 - Fellow of the Royal Society of London

== See also ==
- Lead chamber process
