= Samuel Garbett =

British businessman (1717–1803)

- Born: 1717
- Died: 5 December 1803
- Resting place: St Philip's, Birmingham
- Occupation: Industrialist
- Relatives: Charles Gascoigne (son-in-law)

Samuel Garbett (1717– 5 December 1803) was a prominent citizen of Birmingham England, during the Industrial Revolution, and a friend of Matthew Boulton. Historian Carl Chinn argues that he:

stood alongside Boulton as one of the key figures responsible for Birmingham's rapid expansion into one of the world's leading industrial towns.

Garbett's education extended:

[no] further than writing and accounts; but he was a man of great acuteness of genius and extent of understanding.

Garbett was employed by a London merchant named Hollis, as his agent for purchasing goods in Birmingham. In that role, he came:

into notice and rank among his townsmen; and the more he was known, the more he was esteemed.

He married Anne Clay (d. 1772) of Aston in August 1735.

He then made his fortune as a merchant in his own right, before entering partnership with Dr John Roebuck to set up a laboratory in Steelhouse Lane where precious metals were refined and assayed; a manufacturing centre for sulphuric acid in Prestonpans in 1749; and, with William Cadell and John Roebuck, founded the Carron Iron Works, in Scotland, in 1759, in which the two Birmingham men each held a 25% share. He also chaired, from January 1788, a Birmingham committee against the slave trade.

His eldest child and only daughter Mary married Charles Gascoigne in 1759, and in 1765 Gascoigne became a partner in the Carron works, having been manager of Garbett's nearby turpentine factory, Garbett & Co., since 1763.

Garbett was involved in the creation of Birmingham Assay Office in 1773, and was the first chairman of Birmingham's Commercial Committee, forerunner of successive Birmingham Chambers of Commerce, as was a member of the committee that raised funds to create Birmingham General Hospital.

He was declared bankrupt in 1782. Boulton encouraged him to re-establish his business in Birmingham, which he did successfully.

At his death in 1803, his estate was over £12,000, albeit with some creditors not discharged. He was buried at St Philip's Church (later Birmingham's cathedral), where he had been a church warden. Matthew Boulton wrote of him:

I have always found his principles unfailingly just, honourable and liberal.

Throughout his life, Garbett played a prominent part in local politics and affairs, including police proposals and the development of Birmingham's canals. During the Birmingham riots of 1791, it was at his house in Newhall Street that the town and country gentry held their emergency meetings. His political lobbying in general, and correspondence with Shelburne in particular, make him a significant figure in national politics.
