= Caddell =

Caddell is a surname. Notable people with the surname include:

- James Caddell (1794–1826), New Zealand Pākehā Māori, sealer and interpreter
- Jason Caddell, guitarist in The Dismemberment Plan, a Washington D.C.–based indie rock band
- John B. Caddell, after whom the ship John B. Caddell was named
- Patrick Caddell (1950–2019), American public opinion pollster and a political film consultant
- Shirley Caddell (1931–2010), American country music and rockabilly singer, yodeller, guitarist and songwriter
- Trevor Caddell (born 1993), American professional wrestler, better known by the ring name Trevor Lee
- Walter Caddell (1879–1944), British military officer

== See also ==
- Cadell
