= William Cadell =

Scottish industrialist

William Archibald Cadell
- Born: 1708
- Died: 1777 (aged 68–69)
- Occupation: Industrialist
- Known for: Founder of Carron Iron Works
- Relatives: Henry Cadell (great, great grandson)

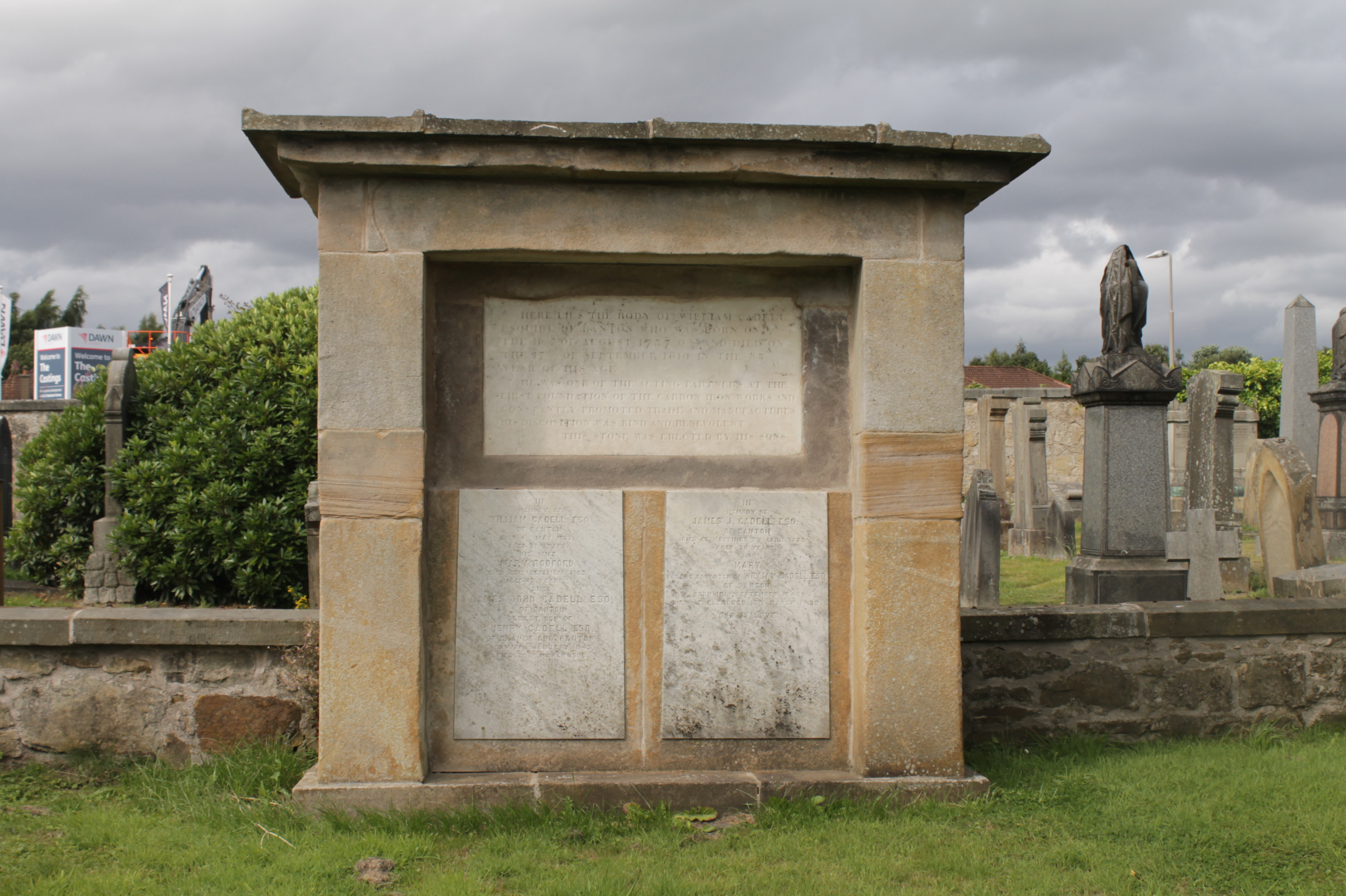
The grave of William Cadell, Larbert Churchyard

William Archibald Cadell of Cockenzie (1708–1777) was a Scottish industrialist, one of the pioneers of the industrial revolution on the Firth of Forth. He was a member of a merchant family involved in the import of iron from Russia and Sweden.

He and his son, also William (baptised 1737, died 1819), were founders with Samuel Garbett and John Roebuck, of the Carron Iron Works, in 1759, originally known as Roebuck, Garbett & Cadells.

His daughter Christian Cadell married Thomas Edington (1742-1811) who became joint proprietor at Cramond Iron Works before establishing his own independent company in Glasgow in 1797: Thomas Edington & Son. Their grandson was the geologist Thomas Edington FRSE (1814-1859).

His great-great-grandson was the geologist Henry Cadell.
