= Carron Company =

British producer of cast iron products

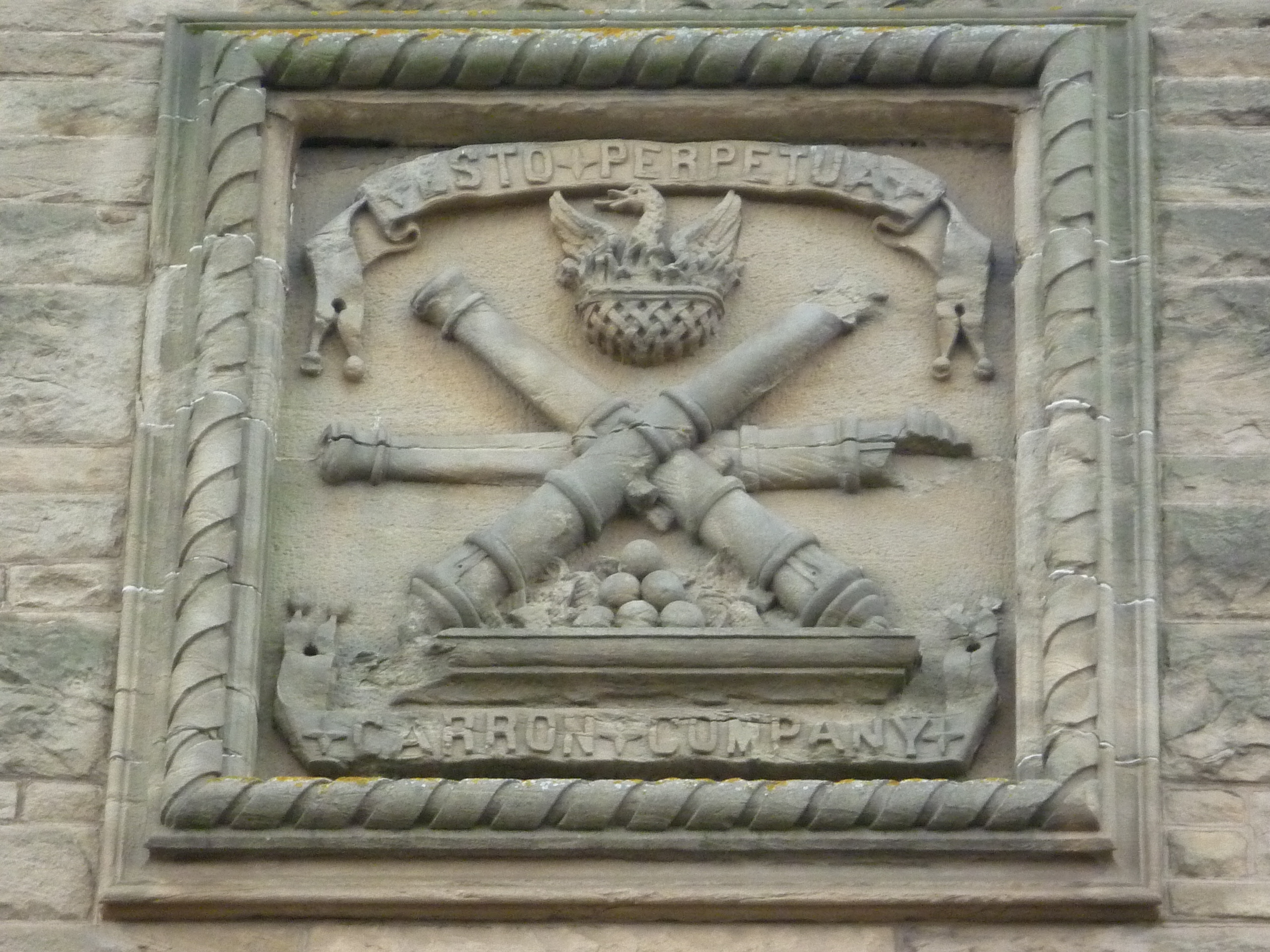
- Industry: Ironworks
- Founded: 1759; 267 years ago in Falkirk, Scotland, United Kingdom
- Founder: John Roebuck
- Defunct: 1982
- Fate: went into receivership in 1982
- Successor: Carron Phoenix
- Area served: worldwide
- Key people: Charles Gascoigne
- Products: Cast iron products
- Number of employees: 2000

The Carron Company was an ironworks established in 1759 on the banks of the River Carron near Falkirk, in Stirlingshire, Scotland. After initial problems, the company was at the forefront of the Industrial Revolution in the United Kingdom. The company prospered through its development and production of a new short-range and short-barrelled naval cannon, the carronade. The company was one of the largest iron works in Europe through the 19th century. After 223 years, the company became insolvent in 1982 and was later acquired by the Franke Corporation, being rebranded Carron Phoenix.

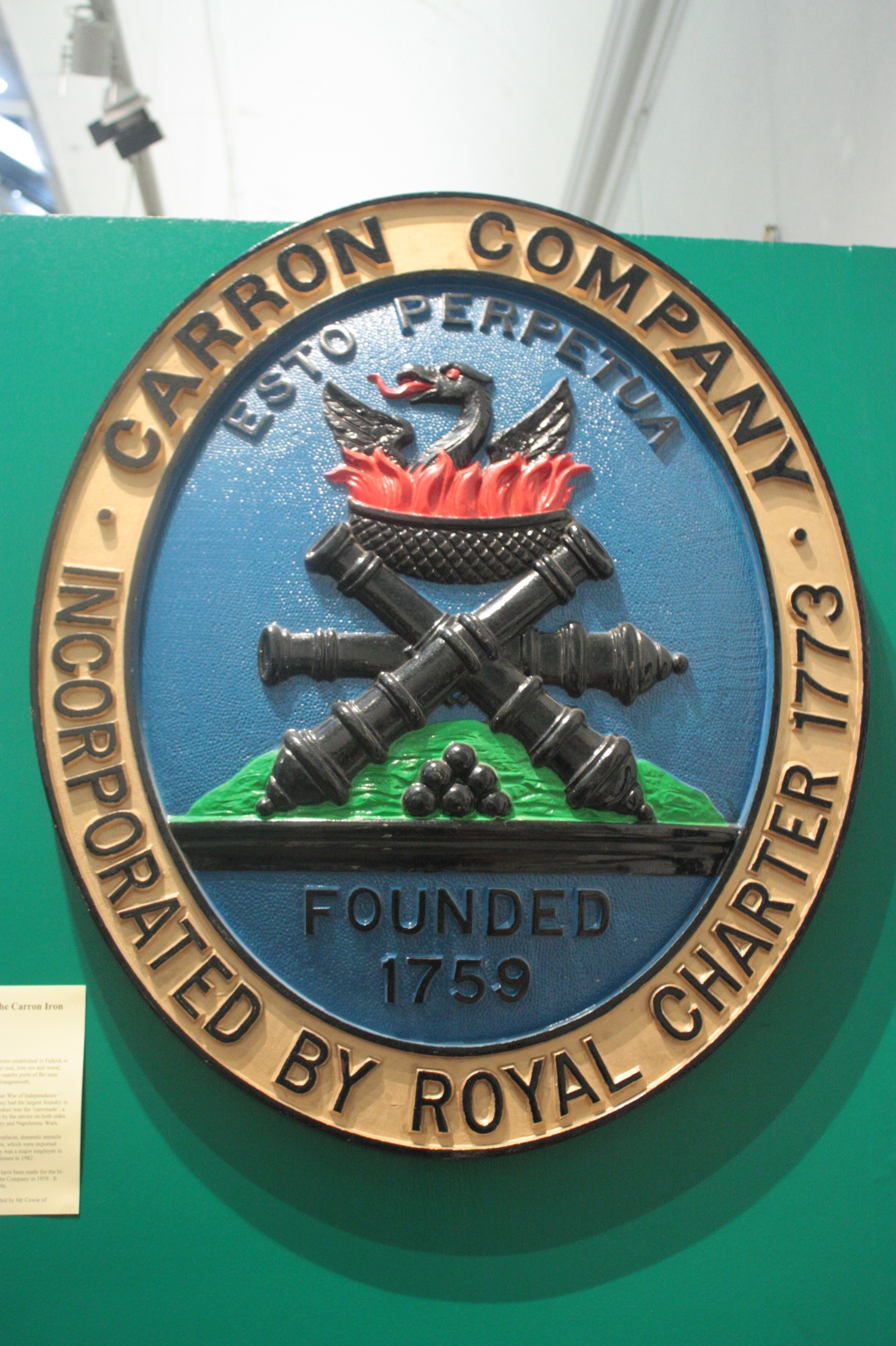
Carron Company insignia

== Early years ==
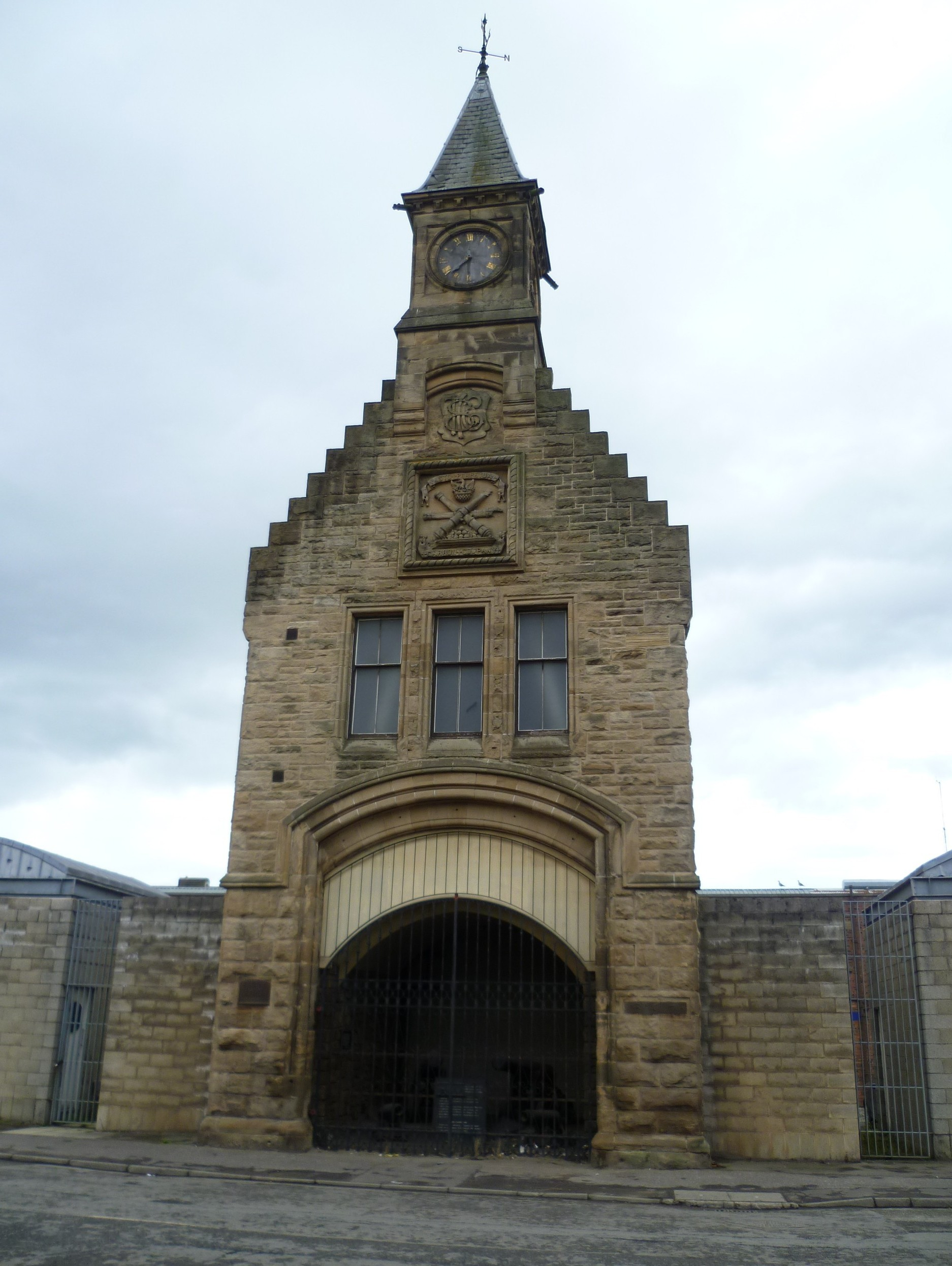
Clocktower entrance to the Carron Works

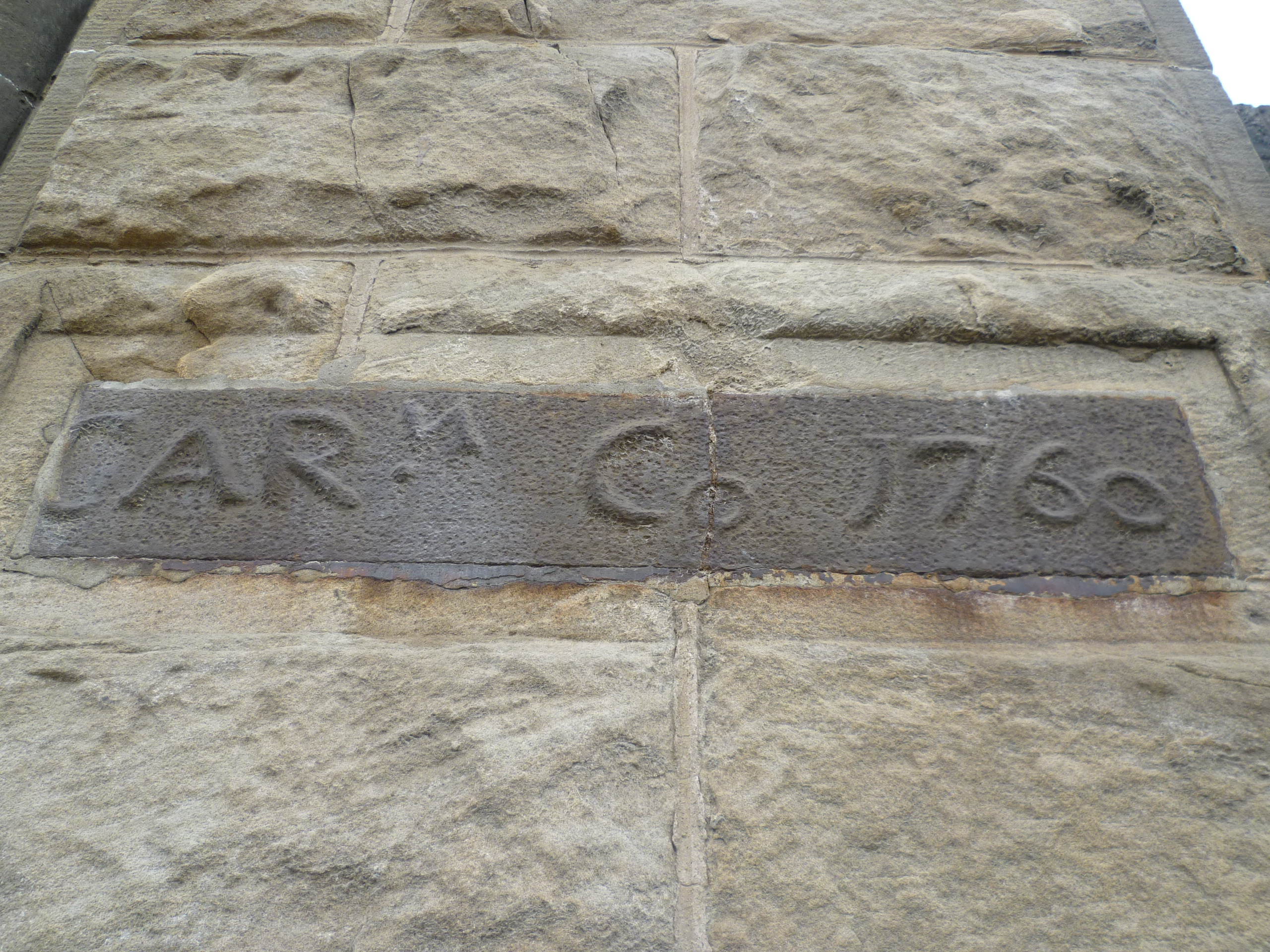
Fragment of the first blast furnace in the clocktower of the Carron Works

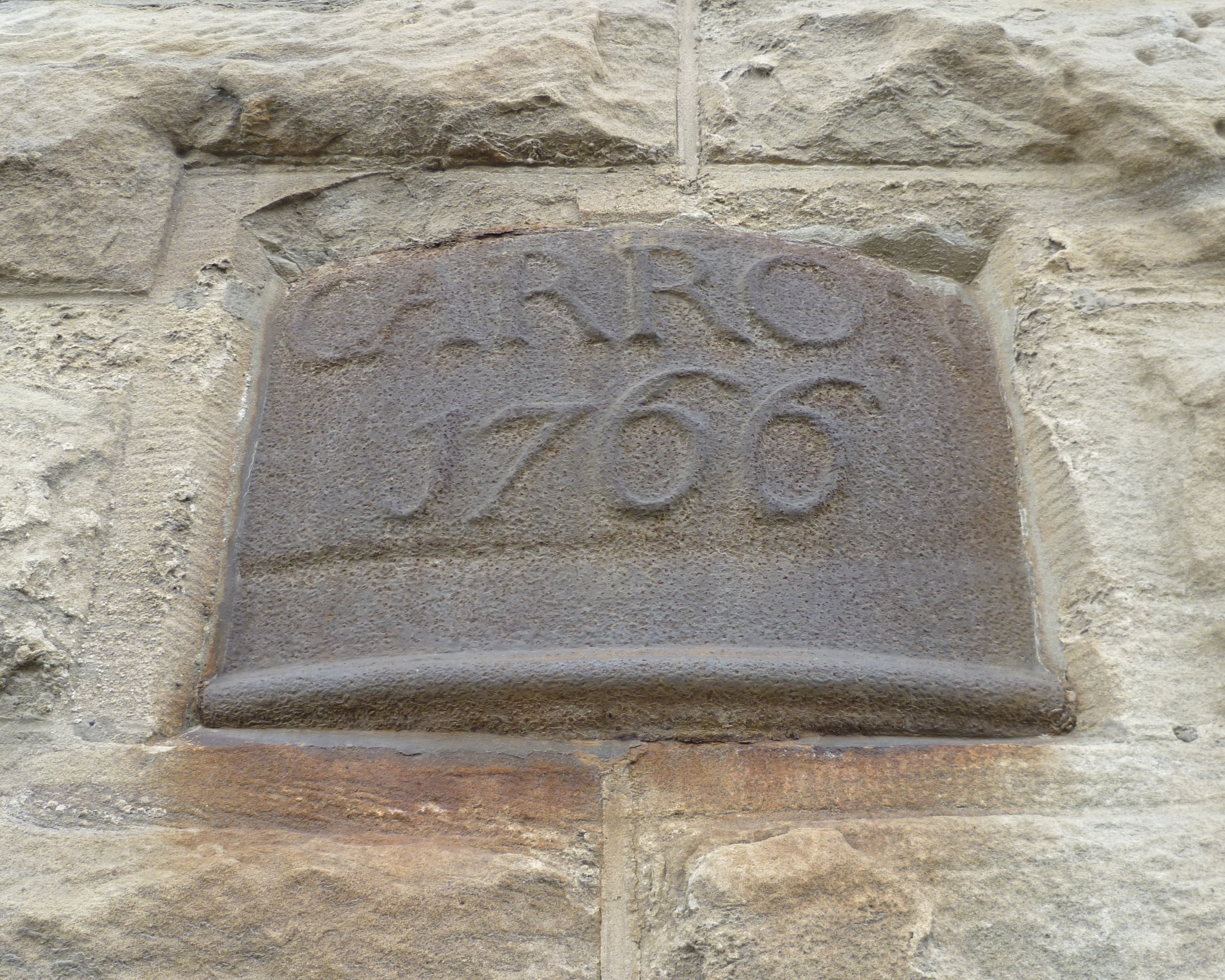
Cylinder fragment of Watt's first operational steam engine at the Carron Works

The original founders of the Carron Works were: John Roebuck, a medical doctor and chemist from Sheffield; his two brothers, Thomas Roebuck and Ebenezer Roebuck; Samuel Garbett, a merchant from Birmingham; William Cadell, Senior, an industrialist from a merchant family, from Cockenzie, East Lothian; his son, William Cadell, Junior; and John Cadell.

The factory of "Roebuck, Garbett and Cadells" was established on the north bank of Carron Water, two miles north of Falkirk. Taking iron ore from Bo'ness and water from the Carron, they decided to use the new method pioneered by Abraham Darby at Coalbrookdale, using coke from coal mines in the vicinity as fuel rather than the usual charcoal. The works helped to push other less technologically advanced ironworks, such as the Wealden iron industry based in the Weald, out of business.

Cadell's young son, also William, was appointed manager, and the company's financial position was precarious in its first few years. It took time and a considerable investment to create the necessary infrastructure and for the largely unskilled workforce to develop the techniques of iron working. The first blast furnace became operational on 26 December 1760, producing pig iron. However, when the factory started to produce cast iron goods, they were of a generally poor quality. Nevertheless, in 1764, the Board of Ordnance granted the company a lucrative contract to supply armaments to the British armed forces. The company also cast parts for James Watt's steam engine in 1765.

The company's fortunes had begun to improve as a result of Charles Gascoigne becoming a partner in 1765. Gascoigne was a grandson of Charles Elphinstone, 9th Lord Elphinstone and had married Samuel Garbett's daughter in 1759. Gascoigne introduced many improvements in the company's techniques of production, and devoted considerable effort to increasing the quality of its work, and he took over the management of the works from William Cadell Jr, in 1769.

The company's strict control over its supply of resources, including use of coal miners under conditions of life bondage, gave rise to disputes, with troops being called out to quell conflict on more than one occasion in the 1760s and 1770s.

The company received a royal charter to incorporate as the Carron Company in 1773. However, despite Gascoigne's efforts, the quality of company's products had remained low, and the company's contracts to supply the Royal Navy were cancelled in 1773, with the company's cannon being removed from all naval vessels. A representative of the Royal Artillery, Captain Blair, inspected the Carron Works in 1774 and reported ongoing problems with quality and handling of the guns: "on the death of [Carron Guns partner Ebenezer] Roebuck the Carron Guns had through the carelessness of the workmen very much deteriorated, and the firm lost ground." Despite this negative assessment, the report noted with approval that Charles Gascoigne was attempting to revive the firm.

This was met with some success when John & George Erving of Boston were instructed to import military stores in 1775 including 50 Carron Works iron stoves, made very cheap, 24 x 18 inches with doors everything ready to set up, plus supplies of coal for use by General Howe's North America army.

== Carronades ==
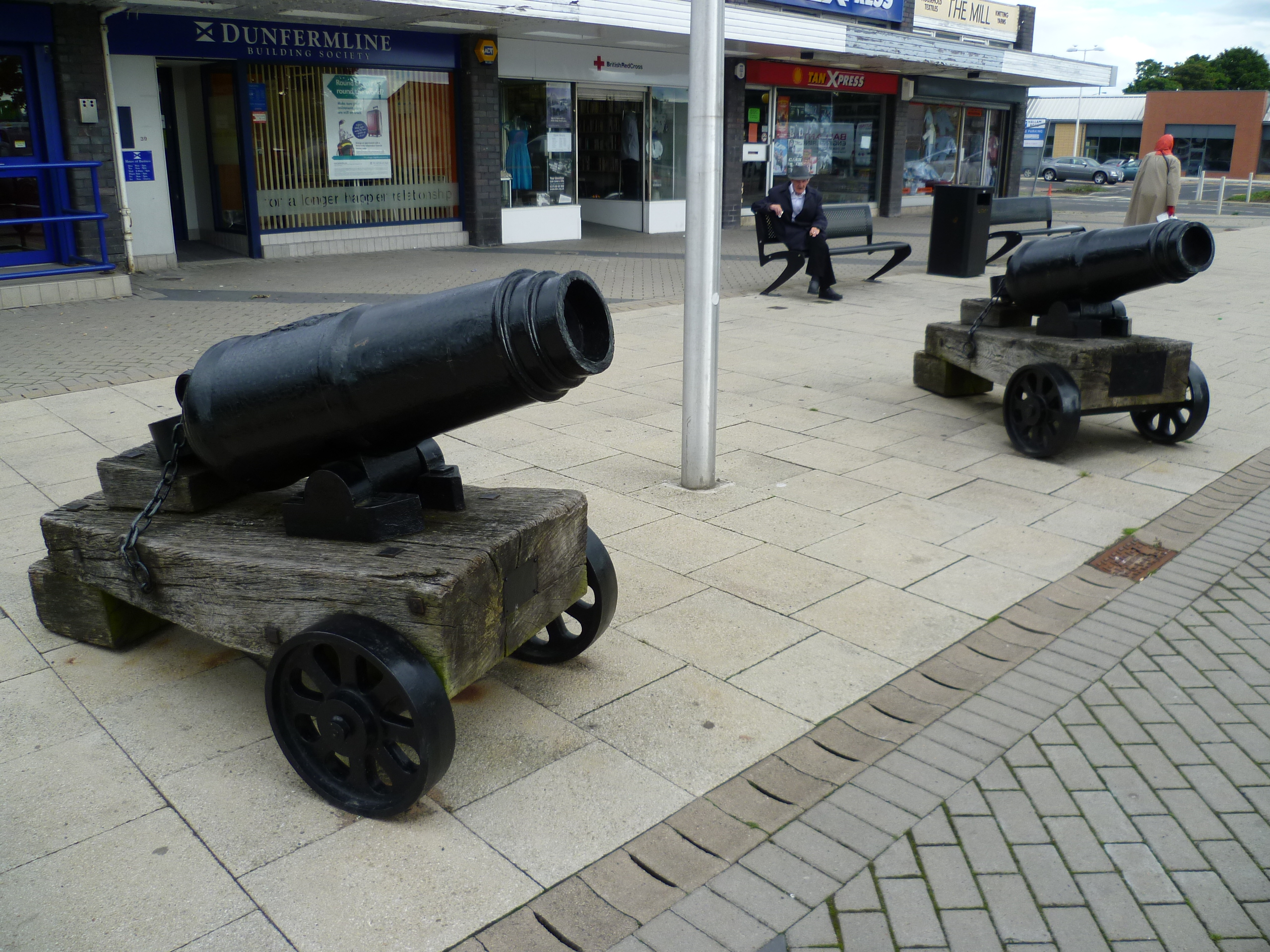
A pair of preserved carronades in King Street, Stenhousemuir

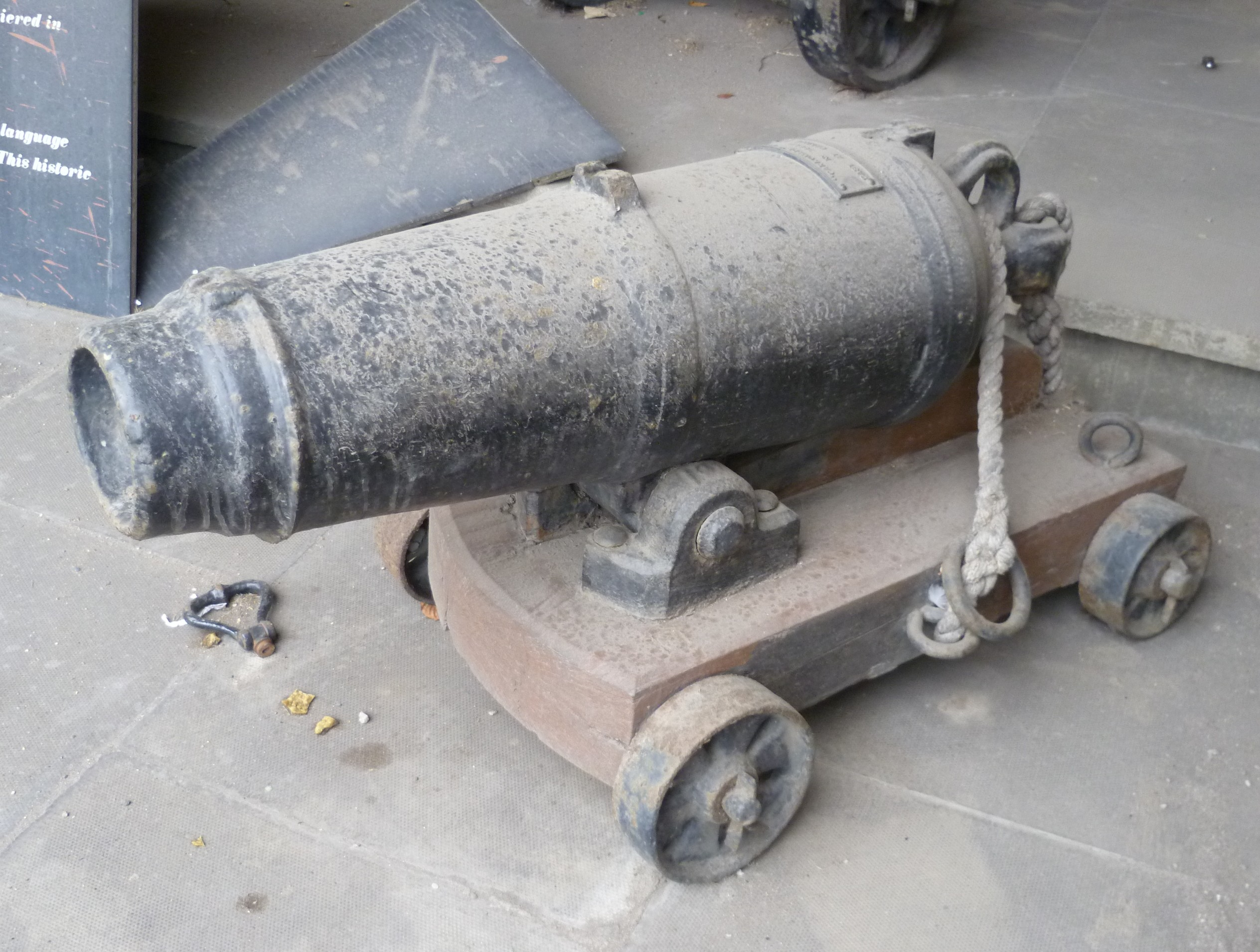
A neglected carronade still on display at the former Carron Works

Gascoigne pushed forward the development of a new type of cannon, originally known as the "Gasconades" but better known by its later name, the "Carronade". It was shorter and much lighter than a long gun of the same calibre, meaning that more could be carried, and it was also quicker to load and required a smaller crew. On the debit side, carronades had a short range.

Some warships - mainly small ones - were equipped with carronades as their main or only armament, but such vessels were vulnerable to opponents armed with long guns. The carronade's principal use was on the upper decks of warships, where batteries of carronades replaced smaller numbers of long guns. This greatly increased firepower at the close ranges at which contemporary naval battles were usually fought, without impairing stability or sailing qualities.

The carronade was a considerable success, and remained in production from 1778 to the 1850s. The company established such a reputation for quality that the Duke of Wellington remarked in a letter to Admiral Berkley in 1812 that he only wanted cannon manufactured by the Carron Company in his army. The company also made ammunition, including some invented by Henry Shrapnel.

The company supplied armaments to governments outside the UK, including weapons supplied to the embryonic United States which were used against Britain in the War of 1812. The British government tried to prevent the company from supplying plans and equipment to the Russian Empire, intended to improve Catherine the Great's weapons foundry at Petrozavodsk; nonetheless, Gascoigne delivered the Russian's orders, and travelled to Russia in May 1786 to supervise the works. He remained in Russia for 20 years, dying in July 1806 in Kolpino near St. Petersburg as Actual State Councillor Karl Karlovich Gaskoin.

== Prosperity and fall ==
By 1814, the Carron Company was the largest iron works in Europe, employing over 2,000 workers, and it attracted many innovators. William Symington was an engineer for the Carron Company in the early 19th century, and the company made engines for his steamboats, the Experiment and the Charlotte Dundas. John Smeaton was a consultant for the company. Henry Cort experimented on methods to produce malleable iron, anticipating the puddling process. Benjamin Franklin visited the factory, leaving works and is said to have left a design for a stove called 'Dr Franklin's stove or the Philadelphia stove'.

The company produced pig iron throughout the 19th century, together with cast-iron products such as balustrades, fire grates, and the Carron bathtub. It ran its own shipping line, and produced munitions in both World Wars. It later became one of several foundries producing pillar boxes and was one of five foundries casting Sir Giles Gilbert Scott's classic Red telephone boxes. In the 1960s, it produced cast-iron rings to line the Tyne Tunnel under the River Tyne from Jarrow to Howdon and the Clyde Tunnel under the River Clyde from Whiteinch to Govan near Glasgow.

The company diversified into plastics and stainless steel, but the works went into receivership in 1982.

== Carron Phoenix ==
The company was taken over and operates today under the name of Carron Phoenix, part of the Franke corporation. Like its predecessor, The Carron Company, Carron Phoenix's headquarters are at the Carron Works in Falkirk.

Carron Phoenix produces stainless steel, ceramic and granite moulded sinks which are sold around the world but some areas of production have been moved to China and Slovakia.

== Gallery ==
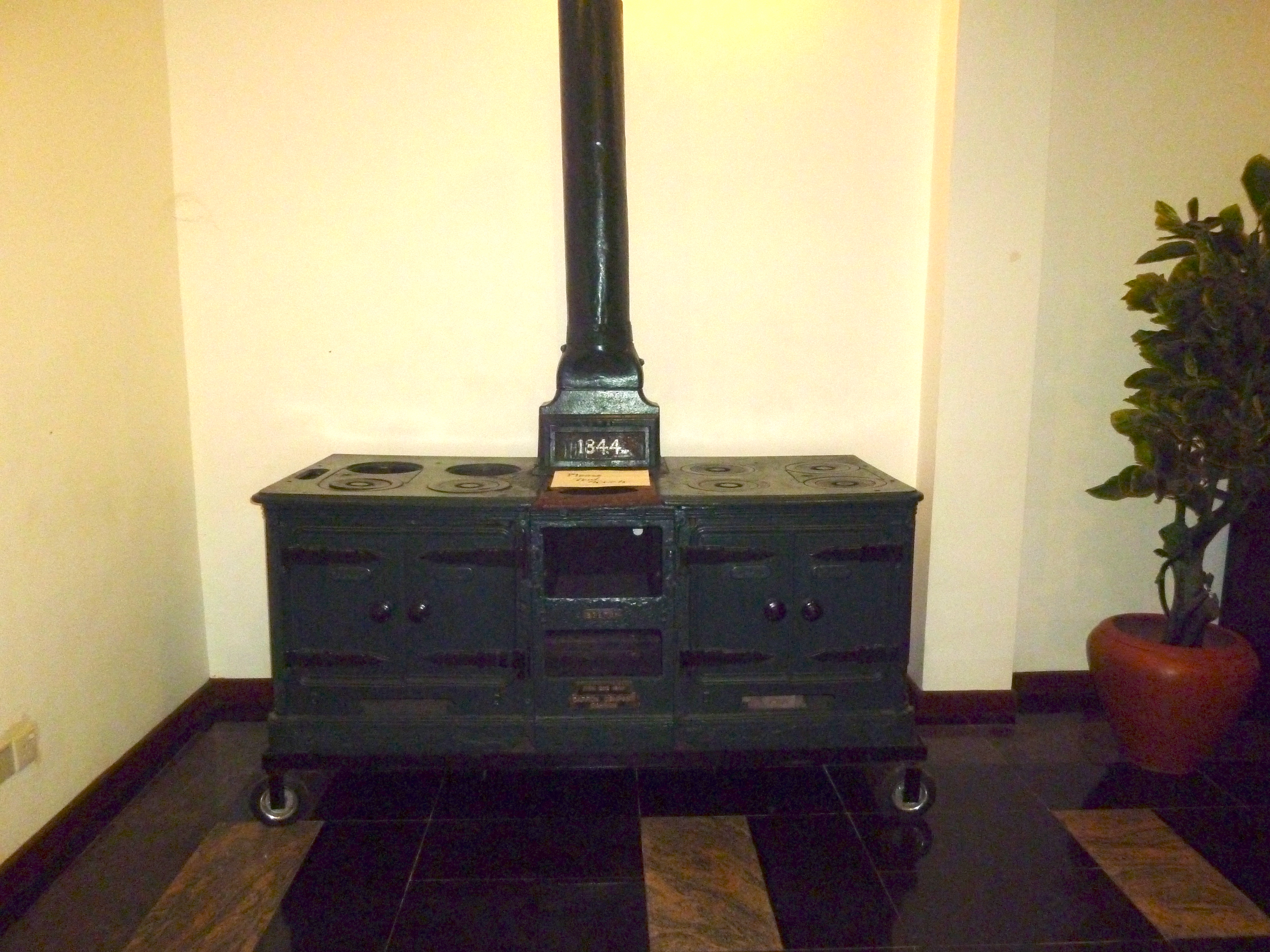
An iron oven manufactured by Carron Company Scotland

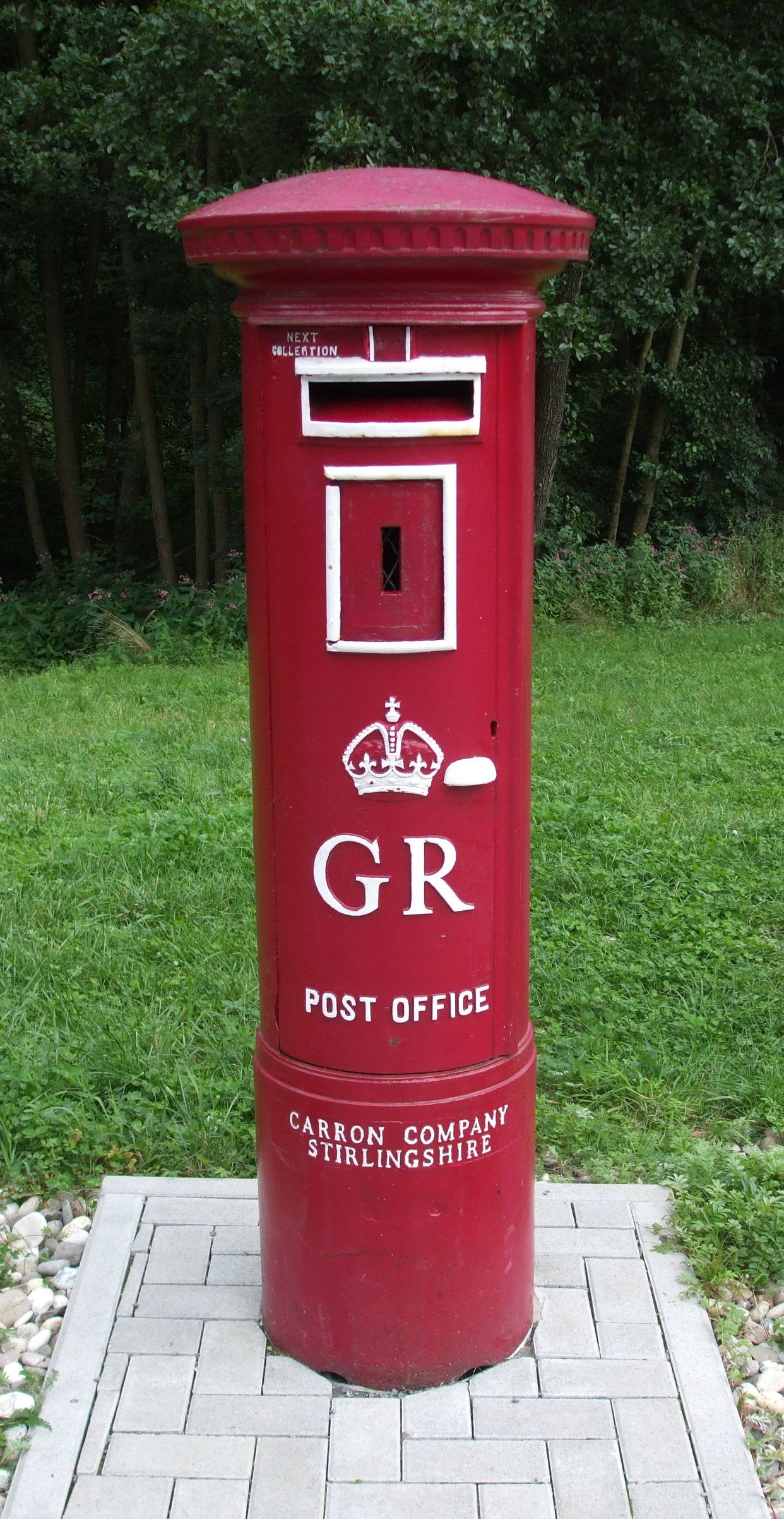
The words "Carron Company Stirlingshire" appear near the base of many UK pillar boxes

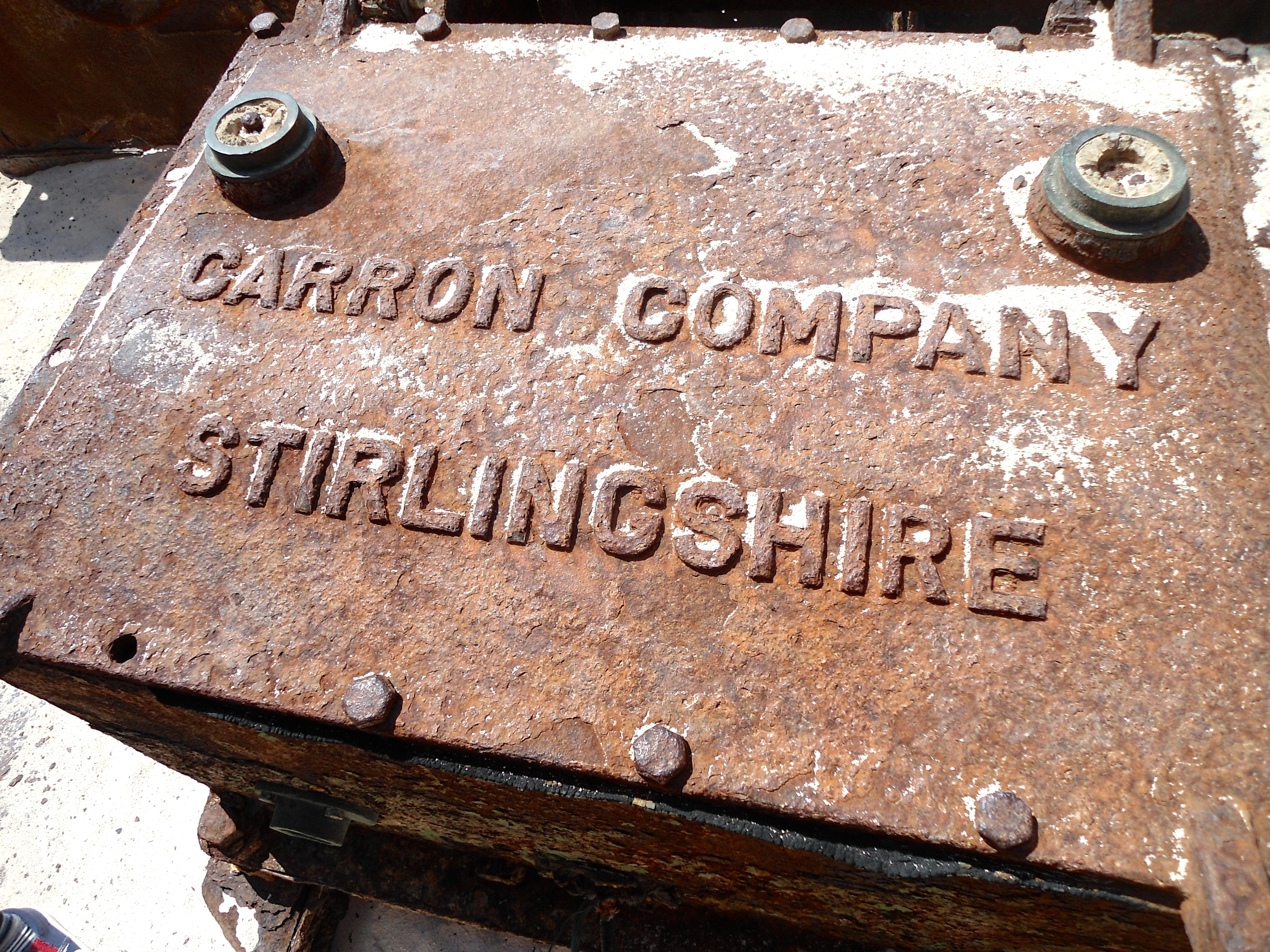
A detail from the famous MV Panagiotis shipwreck (aka Navagio), situated on a beach of the island of Zakynthos, Greece.

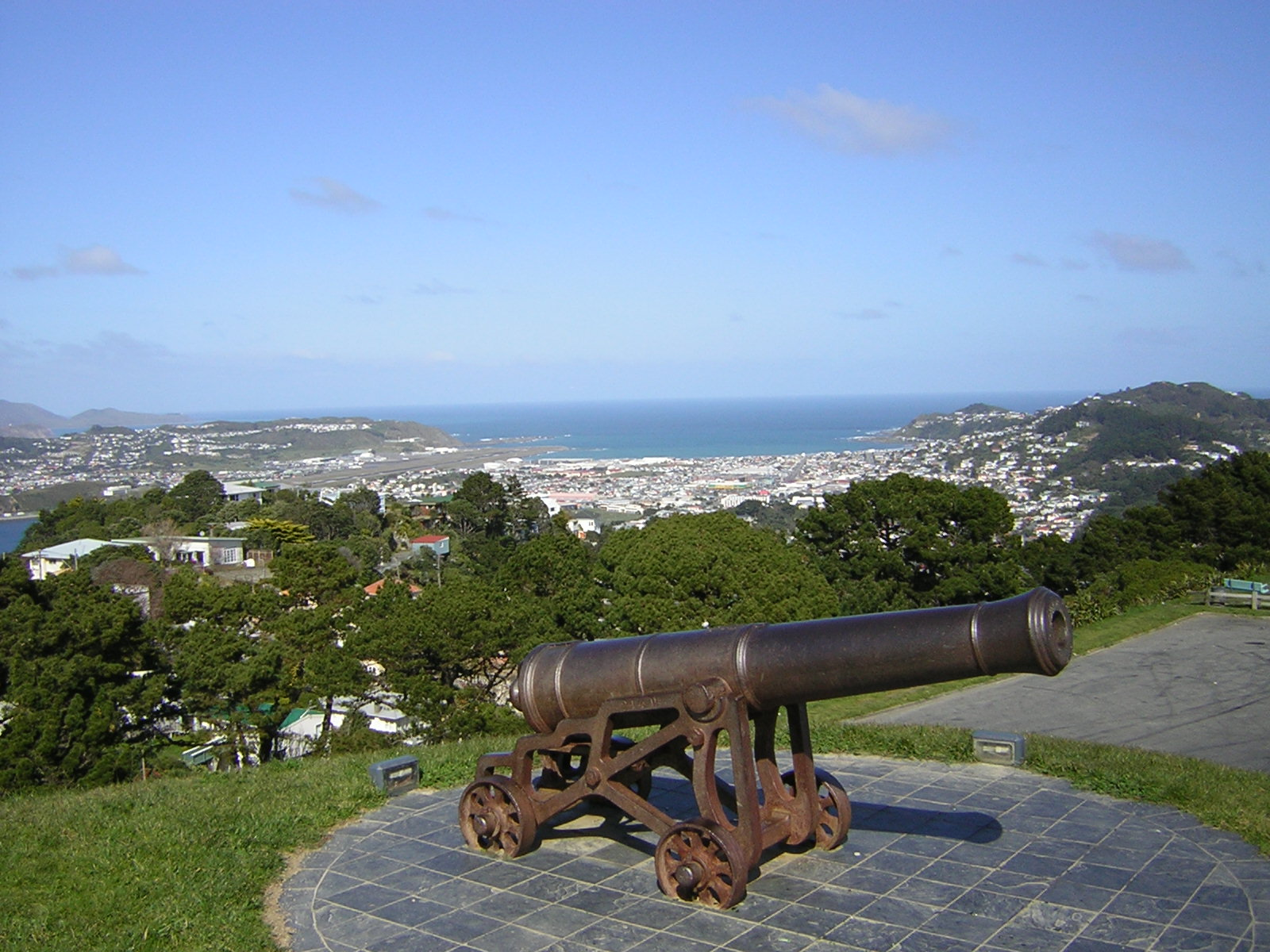
24-pounder cannon made in 1813, used as a time gun on Mount Victoria, Wellington, New Zealand

== See also ==
- Abbotshaugh Community Woodland
